= List of football clubs in Croatia =

This is a list of association football clubs located in Croatia, sorted by league and division within the Croatian football league system, as of the 2019–20 season. A total of 98 clubs compete in the top three tiers of the Croatian football pyramid, divided as follows:

- Croatian First Football League (also known as Prva HNL or 1. HNL, with 10 clubs)
- Croatian Second Football League (also known as Druga HNL or 2. HNL, with 16 clubs)
- Croatian Third Football League (also known as Treća HNL or 3. HNL, with five regional subdivisions – Centre (16 clubs), East (16 clubs), North (12 clubs), South (16 clubs) and West (12 clubs) – for a total of 72 clubs)

== First Division ==
Club	City / town	Founded in	UEFA Ranking
GNK Dinamo Zagreb	Zagreb	1911	34
HNK Gorica	Velika Gorica	1934	-
HNK Hajduk Split	Split	1911	141
HNK Šibenik	Šibenik	1932	-
NK Istra 1961	Pula	1948	-
NK Lokomotiva	Zagreb	1914	229
NK Osijek	Osijek	1947	140
HNK Rijeka	Rijeka	1904	94
NK Slaven Belupo	Koprivnica	1907	-
NK Varaždin	Varaždin	2012	-

== Second Division ==
Club	City / town
NK BSK	Bijelo Brdo
HNK Cibalia	Vinkovci
NK Croatia	Zmijavci
GNK Dinamo Zagreb II	Zagreb
NK Dubrava	Zagreb
NK Dugopolje	Dugopolje
HNK Hajduk Split II	Split
NK Hrvatski Dragovoljac	Zagreb
NK Kustošija	Zagreb
NK Međimurje	Čakovec
HNK Orijent 1919	Rijeka
NK Osijek II	Osijek
NK Rudeš	Zagreb
NK Sesvete	Zagreb
NK Solin	Solin
NK Inter	Zaprešić

== Third Division ==
=== Centre ===
Club	City / town
NK Bistra	Bistra
NK Dugo Selo	Dugo Selo
NK Gaj	Mače
NK HAŠK	Zagreb
NK Karlovac 1919	Karlovac
NK Kurilovec	Velika Gorica
NK Lučko	Zagreb
NK Lukavec	Lukavec
NK Maksimir	Zagreb
NK Petrinja	Petrinja
NK Ponikve	Zagreb
NK Ravnice	Zagreb
HNK Segesta	Sisak
NK Trešnjevka	Zagreb
NK Trnje	Zagreb
NK Vrapče	Zagreb
NK Vrbovec	Vrbovec
NK Zagorec	Krapina

=== East ===
Club	City / town
NK Bedem	Ivankovo
NK Belišće	Belišće
NK Čepin	Čepin
HNK Đakovo Croatia	Đakovo
NK Graničar	Županja
NK Kutjevo	Kutjevo
NK Marsonia	Slavonski Brod
NK NAŠK	Našice
NK Oriolik	Oriovac
NK Slavija	Pleternica
NK Slavonija	Požega
NK Sloga	Nova Gradiška
NK Vihor	Jelisavac
HNK Vukovar '91	Vukovar
NK Vuteks-Sloga	Vukovar
NK Zrinski	Jurjevac Punitovački

=== North ===
Club	City / town
NK Bjelovar	Bjelovar
NK Graničar	Đurđevac
NK Koprivnica	Koprivnica
NK Mladost	Ždralovi
NK Papuk	Orahovica
NK Podravac	Virje
NK Podravina	Ludbreg
NK Polet	Sveti Martin na Muri
NK Radnik	Križevci
NK Rudar	Mursko Središće
NK Varteks	Varaždin
NK Virovitica	Virovitica

=== South ===
Club	City / town
NK GOŠK	Dubrovnik
NK Hrvace	Hrvace
NK Jadran Luka Ploče	Ploče
NK Junak	Sinj
NK Kamen	Ivanbegovina
NK Neretva	Metković
NK Neretvanac	Opuzen
HNK Primorac	Biograd na Moru
HNK Sloga	Mravince
RNK Split	Split
NK Urania	Baška Voda
NK Uskok	Klis
NK Vodice	Vodice
NK Zadar	Zadar
NK Zagora	Unešić
BŠK Zmaj	Blato

=== West ===
Club	City / town
NK Crikvenica	Crikvenica
NK Grobničan	Čavle
NK Jadran	Poreč
NK Krk	Krk
NK Nehaj	Senj
NK Novigrad	Novigrad
NK Opatija	Opatija
NK Pazinka	Pazin
NK Rovinj	Rovinj
NK Rudar	Labin
NK Uljanik	Pula
NK Vinodol	Novi Vinodolski

== Women's First Division ==
Club	City / town
ŽNK Agram	Zagreb
ŽNK Katarina Zrinski	Čakovec
ŽNK Marjan	Split
ŽNK Neretva	Metković
ŽNK Osijek	Osijek
ŽNK Pregrada	Pregrada
ŽNK Rijeka	Rijeka
ŽNK Split	Split
ŽNK Trnava	Goričan
ŽNK Viktorija	Slavonski Brod
