= 2001–02 in Croatian football =

First Division champions
- NK Zagreb (1st title)

Second Division champions
- Vukovar '91 (North Division); Istra Pula (South Division)

Third Division champions
- Dilj, Mladost Prelog, Opatija, Napredak Velika Mlaka, Primorac Stobreč

Croatian Cup winners
- Dinamo Zagreb (5th title)

Teams in Europe
- Dinamo Zagreb, Hajduk Split, Osijek, Slaven Belupo, Varteks, NK Zagreb

Croatia national team
- 2002 World Cup qualification; 2002 World Cup

The following article presents a summary of the 2001–2002 football (soccer) season in Croatia, which was the 11th season of competitive football in the country.

== League tables ==
=== Prva HNL ===
Pos	Team	Pld	W	D	L	GF	GA	GD	Pts	Qualification or relegation
1	NK Zagreb (C)	30	20	7	3	71	24	+47	67	Qualification to Champions League second qualifying round
2	Hajduk Split	30	20	5	5	61	28	+33	65	Qualification to UEFA Cup qualifying round
3	Dinamo Zagreb	30	18	5	7	58	30	+28	59	Qualification to UEFA Cup first round
4	Varteks	30	17	6	7	58	40	+18	57	Qualification to UEFA Cup qualifying round
5	Rijeka	30	15	6	9	46	37	+9	51	Qualification to Intertoto Cup first round
6	Slaven Belupo	30	11	9	10	34	36	−2	42	Qualification to Intertoto Cup first round
7	Pomorac	30	12	4	14	36	41	−5	40	
8	Osijek	30	11	4	15	45	48	−3	37	
9	Zadar	30	9	9	12	43	47	−4	36	
10	Cibalia	30	9	9	12	34	37	−3	36	
11	Šibenik (O)	30	10	6	14	33	36	−3	36	Qualification to relegation play-offs
12	Kamen Ingrad (O)	30	9	8	13	28	46	−18	35	Qualification to relegation play-offs
13	Hrvatski Dragovoljac (R)	30	9	7	14	34	45	−11	34	Relegation to Croatian Second Football League
14	Čakovec (R)	30	9	5	16	31	44	−13	32	Relegation to Croatian Second Football League
15	Marsonia (R)	30	8	6	16	37	46	−9	30	Relegation to Croatian Second Football League
16	TŠK Topolovac (R)	30	4	2	24	31	95	−64	14	Relegation to Croatian Second Football League

Source: RSSSF.org
Rules for classification: 1) points; 2) goal difference; 3) number of goals scored.
(C) Champions; (O) Play-off winners; (R) Relegated

==== Relegation play-offs ====
First legs were held on 15 May and second legs on 19 May, 2002.

Team 1	Agg.	Team 2	1st leg	2nd leg
Vukovar '91	3–4	Šibenik	0–0	3–4
Istra Pula	1–3	Kamen Ingrad	0–1	1–2

=== Druga HNL ===
==== North Division ====
Pos	Team	Pld	W	D	L	GF	GA	GD	Pts	Promotion or relegation
1	Vukovar '91 (C)	30	23	2	5	87	30	+57	71	Qualification to promotion play-off
2	Belišće	30	21	5	4	74	26	+48	68	
3	Valpovka	30	15	6	9	53	39	+14	51	
4	Metalac Osijek	30	15	6	9	43	40	+3	51	
5	Koprivnica	30	15	5	10	64	46	+18	50	
6	Grafičar Vodovod	30	14	5	11	46	35	+11	47	
7	Sloga Nova Gradiška	30	13	5	12	60	46	+14	44	
8	Omladinac Novo Selo Rok	30	13	4	13	54	60	−6	43	
9	Podravac	30	12	5	13	41	56	−15	41	
10	Bjelovar (R)	30	12	4	14	49	47	+2	40	Qualification to relegation play-off
11	Mladost Molve (R)	30	10	10	10	45	46	−1	40	Relegation to Croatian Third Football League
12	Papuk Orahovica (R)	30	10	3	17	40	57	−17	33	Relegation to Croatian Third Football League
13	Bedem Ivankovo (R)	30	9	4	17	39	54	−15	31	Relegation to Croatian Third Football League
14	Ivančica Ivanec (R)	30	8	6	16	35	45	−10	30	Relegation to Croatian Third Football League
15	Sloga Čakovec (R)	30	6	3	21	34	82	−48	21	Relegation to Croatian Third Football League
16	NAŠK (R)	30	6	3	21	30	85	−55	21	Relegation to Croatian Third Football League

Source: RSSSF.org
Rules for classification: 1) points; 2) goal difference; 3) number of goals scored.
(C) Champions; (R) Relegated

==== South Division ====
Pos	Team	Pld	W	D	L	GF	GA	GD	Pts	Promotion or relegation
1	Istra Pula (C)	30	17	8	5	46	21	+25	59	Qualification to promotion play-off
2	Uljanik	30	17	8	5	57	26	+31	59	
3	Novalja	30	14	8	8	30	18	+12	50	
4	Uskok Klis	30	14	7	9	48	32	+16	49	
5	Solin Građa	30	13	9	8	44	24	+20	48	
6	Orijent	30	14	4	12	35	37	−2	46	
7	Croatia Sesvete	30	13	6	11	33	29	+4	45	
8	Inker Zaprešić	30	11	8	11	46	40	+6	41	
9	GOŠK Dubrovnik	30	11	8	11	26	37	−11	41	
10	Imotski (O)	30	12	4	14	36	39	−3	40	Qualification to relegation play-off
11	Mosor (R)	30	10	7	13	38	50	−12	37	Relegation to Croatian Third Football League
12	Žminj (R)	30	11	3	16	25	43	−18	36	Relegation to Croatian Third Football League
13	Segesta (R)	30	9	8	13	28	33	−5	35	Relegation to Croatian Third Football League
14	Samobor (R)	30	8	7	15	31	40	−9	31	Relegation to Croatian Third Football League
15	Trnje (R)	30	5	11	14	30	43	−13	26	Relegation to Croatian Third Football League
16	PIK Vrbovec (R)	30	7	2	21	23	64	−41	23	Relegation to Croatian Third Football League

Source: RSSSF.org
Rules for classification: 1) points; 2) goal difference; 3) number of goals scored.
(C) Champions; (O) Play-off winners; (R) Relegated
