= 1996–97 Croatian Second Football League =

Druga HNL
- Season: 1996–97
- Champions: Budućnost Hodošan (North Division); Croatia Đakovo (East Division); Lučko (Center Division); Jadran Poreč (West Division); RNK Split (South Division)
- Promoted: None
- Relegated: 25 clubs

The 1996–97 Druga HNL (also known as 2. HNL) season was the 6th season of Croatia's second-level football since its establishment in 1992.

The league consisted of 83 teams organized into three geographic groups: Sjever (North, 16 teams), Istok (East, 16 teams), Središte (Center, 16 teams), Zapad (West, 16 teams), and Jug (South, 19 teams).

== North Division ==
Pos	Team	Pld	W	D	L	GF	GA	GD	Pts	Promotion or relegation
1	Budućnost Hodošan (C)	30	24	2	4	91	26	+65	74	
2	Bjelovar	30	23	4	3	73	25	+48	73	
3	Sloboda Varaždin	30	22	4	4	70	28	+42	70	
4	Daruvar	30	19	5	6	64	28	+36	62	
5	Podravac Virje	30	17	5	8	104	44	+60	56	
6	Omladinac Novo Selo Rok	30	14	9	7	50	35	+15	51	
7	Mladost-Nada Hrastovac	30	14	7	9	52	37	+15	49	
8	Graničar Đurđevac	30	12	4	14	43	46	−3	40	
9	Podravina Ludbreg	30	10	7	13	31	41	−10	37	
10	Kraljevčan 38 (R)	30	10	6	14	53	56	−3	36	Relegation to Croatian Third Football League
11	Mladost Ždralovi	30	9	4	17	32	56	−24	31	
12	Spartak Mala Subotica	30	9	2	19	38	52	−14	29	
13	Križevci	30	8	4	18	29	57	−28	28	
14	MIV Sračinec (R)	30	6	4	20	31	85	−54	22	Relegation to Croatian Third Football League
15	Polet Pribislavec	30	4	5	21	26	86	−60	17	
16	Dinamo Predavac (R)	30	2	2	26	21	106	−85	8	Relegation to Croatian Third Football League

Source: RSSSF.org,library.foi.hr 30th round, library.foi.hr 29th round
(C) Champions; (R) Relegated

== East Division ==
Pos	Team	Pld	W	D	L	GF	GA	GD	Pts	Promotion or relegation
1	Croatia Đakovo (C)	30	21	5	4	81	22	+59	68	
2	Baranja Beli Manastir	30	17	7	6	54	22	+32	58	
3	Dilj	30	17	5	8	65	31	+34	55	
4	Amater Slavonski Brod	30	17	3	10	60	28	+32	54	
5	Otok	30	17	2	11	49	38	+11	53	
6	NAŠK Našicecement	30	14	8	8	33	24	+9	50	
7	Đakovo	30	12	7	11	36	40	−4	43	
8	Mladost Cernik	30	11	9	10	47	40	+7	42	
9	Čepin	30	11	7	12	35	35	0	40	
10	Satnica	30	12	4	14	37	41	−4	40	
11	Slobodnica (R)	30	9	7	14	30	51	−21	34	Relegation to Croatian Third Football League
12	Slavija Pleternica (R)	30	8	7	15	41	51	−10	31	Relegation to Croatian Third Football League
13	Lokomotiva Vinkovci (R)	30	10	6	14	31	48	−17	36	Relegation to Croatian Third Football League
14	Jedinstvo Donji Miholjac (R)	30	6	7	17	37	72	−35	25	Relegation to Croatian Third Football League
15	Podvinje (R)	30	6	4	20	23	84	−61	22	Relegation to Croatian Third Football League
16	Metalac OLT Osijek (R)	30	5	6	19	24	54	−30	21	Relegation to Croatian Third Football League

Source: RSSSF.org
(C) Champions; (R) Relegated

== Center Division ==
Pos	Team	Pld	W	D	L	GF	GA	GD	Pts	Promotion or relegation
1	Lučko (C)	30	22	6	2	68	25	+43	72	
2	Badel Sesvete	30	19	3	8	53	32	+21	60	
3	Karlovac	30	17	7	6	56	32	+24	58	
4	PIK Vrbovec	30	15	4	11	57	40	+17	49	
5	Metalac Sisak	30	13	6	11	60	47	+13	45	
6	Radnik Velika Gorica	30	11	11	8	37	24	+13	44	
7	Dinamo Odranski Obrež	30	11	8	11	42	33	+9	41	
8	Regeneracija Mladost Zabok	30	11	7	12	36	46	−10	40	
9	Chromos/Posavina	30	12	4	14	36	47	−11	40	
10	Lokomotiva Zagreb	30	10	6	14	36	43	−7	36	
11	Špansko	30	10	5	15	38	47	−9	35	
12	Vrapče (R)	30	9	7	14	37	45	−8	34	Relegation to Croatian Third Football League
13	Stubica AM (R)	30	9	6	15	43	58	−15	33	Relegation to Croatian Third Football League
14	Trešnjevka (R)	30	7	10	13	34	52	−18	31	Relegation to Croatian Third Football League
15	Moslavina (R)	30	7	7	16	33	55	−22	28	Relegation to Croatian Third Football League
16	Ilovac Karlovac (R)	30	5	7	18	18	53	−35	22	Relegation to Croatian Third Football League

Source: RSSSF.org
(C) Champions; (R) Relegated

== West Division ==
Pos	Team	Pld	W	D	L	GF	GA	GD	Pts	Promotion or relegation
1	Jadran Poreč (C)	30	22	3	5	61	20	+41	69	
2	Pomorac	30	22	3	5	63	16	+47	69	
3	Uljanik	30	19	6	5	65	21	+44	63	
4	Gospić '91	30	16	5	9	47	34	+13	53	
5	Žminj	30	11	9	10	38	38	0	42	
6	Opatija (Note: Opatija were deducted one point.)	30	10	10	10	41	40	+1	39	
7	Pazinka	30	10	9	11	32	33	−1	39	
8	Grobničan	30	11	6	13	31	35	−4	39	
9	Nehaj	30	11	5	14	46	46	0	38	
10	Pula ICI (R)	30	10	8	12	38	47	−9	38	Relegation to Croatian Third Football League
11	Rudar Labin	30	9	7	14	27	45	−18	34	
12	Klana (R)	30	9	5	16	33	51	−18	32	Relegation to Croatian Third Football League
13	Buje	30	6	13	11	35	41	−6	31	
14	Vrbovsko	30	9	4	17	34	56	−22	31	
15	Rovinj	30	7	9	14	32	53	−21	30	
16	Crikvenica (R)	30	5	4	21	24	71	−47	19	Relegation to Croatian Third Football League

Source: RSSSF.org
(C) Champions; (R) Relegated

== South Division ==
Pos	Team	Pld	W	D	L	GF	GA	GD	Pts	Promotion or relegation
1	RNK Split (C)	36	25	5	6	73	25	+48	80	
2	Raštane	36	22	4	10	75	34	+41	70	
3	Jadran NGB Ploče	36	18	9	9	56	27	+29	63	
4	Omiš	36	19	6	11	60	36	+24	63	
5	Mladost Imotska krajina	36	19	4	13	58	36	+22	61	
6	Hrvatski vitez Posedarje	36	18	6	12	53	41	+12	60	
7	Prevlaka Gruda	36	17	8	11	49	29	+20	59	
8	Jadran Kaštel Sućurac	36	17	7	12	54	35	+19	58	
9	Zmaj Makarska	36	16	10	10	55	35	+20	58	
10	Solin	36	17	7	12	61	41	+20	58	
11	Val Kaštel Stari	36	16	9	11	52	34	+18	57	
12	DOŠK Drniš (R)	36	14	5	17	39	58	−19	47	Relegation to Croatian Third Football League
13	Neretvanac (R)	36	14	4	18	43	58	−15	46	Relegation to Croatian Third Football League
14	GOŠK Adriachem Kaštel Gomilica (R)	36	11	10	15	34	52	−18	43	Relegation to Croatian Third Football League
15	Primorac Biograd na Moru (R)	36	11	8	17	37	49	−12	41	Relegation to Croatian Third Football League
16	Dinara (R)	36	11	8	17	27	44	−17	41	Relegation to Croatian Third Football League
17	Croatia Zmijavci (R)	36	8	5	23	28	72	−44	29	Relegation to Croatian Third Football League
18	Trogir (R)	36	4	7	25	35	82	−47	19	Relegation to Croatian Third Football League
19	Jadran Tučepi (R)	36	2	4	30	10	103	−93	10	Relegation to Croatian Third Football League

Source: RSSSF.org
(C) Champions; (R) Relegated
