= 2001–02 Croatian Second Football League =

Druga HNL
- Season: 2001–02
- Champions: Vukovar '91 (North Division); Istra Pula (South Division)
- Promoted: None
- Relegated: 13 teams

The 2001–02 Druga HNL was the 11th season of Druga HNL, the second level league in Croatian football. The format of the league changed from the previous three seasons and was contested in two regional groups (North Division and South Division), with 16 clubs each.

== North Division ==
=== Clubs ===
Club	City / Town	Stadium	Capacity	1999–2000 result
Bedem Ivankovo	Ivankovo	Igralište Grac	1,000	
Belišće	Belišće	Gradski stadion Belišće	4,000	
Bjelovar	Bjelovar	Gradski stadion Bjelovar	4,000	
Grafičar Vodovod	Osijek	Podgrađe	4,500	
Ivančica Ivanec	Ivanec	Gradski stadion Ivanec	1,500	
Koprivnica	Koprivnica	Gradski stadion Koprivnica	4,000	
Metalac Osijek	Osijek	SC Bikara	1,500	
Mladost Molve	Molve	Petar Focić Stadium	1,000	
NAŠK	Našice	NK NAŠK	2,000	
Omladinac Novo Selo Rok	Novo Selo Rok	NK Omladinac	1,000	
Papuk Orahovica	Orahovica	Gradski stadion Orahovica	2,000	
Podravac Virje	Virje	Sportski park Podravac	3,000	
Sloga Čakovec	Čakovec	NK Sloga	3,000	
Sloga Nova Gradiška	Nova Gradiška	Gradski stadion Nova Gradiška	3,000	
Valpovka	Valpovo	Sportski park	1,000	
Vukovar '91	Vukovar	Gradski stadion Borovo Naselje	6,000	

=== League table ===
Pos	Team	Pld	W	D	L	GF	GA	GD	Pts	Promotion or relegation
1	Vukovar '91 (C)	30	23	2	5	87	30	+57	71	Qualification to promotion play-off
2	Belišće	30	21	5	4	74	26	+48	68	
3	Valpovka	30	15	6	9	53	39	+14	51	
4	Metalac Osijek	30	15	6	9	43	40	+3	51	
5	Koprivnica	30	15	5	10	64	46	+18	50	
6	Grafičar Vodovod	30	14	5	11	46	35	+11	47	
7	Sloga Nova Gradiška	30	13	5	12	60	46	+14	44	
8	Omladinac Novo Selo Rok	30	13	4	13	54	60	−6	43	
9	Podravac	30	12	5	13	41	56	−15	41	
10	Bjelovar (R)	30	12	4	14	49	47	+2	40	Qualification to relegation play-off
11	Mladost Molve (R)	30	10	10	10	45	46	−1	40	Relegation to Croatian Third Football League
12	Papuk Orahovica (R)	30	10	3	17	40	57	−17	33	Relegation to Croatian Third Football League
13	Bedem Ivankovo (R)	30	9	4	17	39	54	−15	31	Relegation to Croatian Third Football League
14	Ivančica Ivanec (R)	30	8	6	16	35	45	−10	30	Relegation to Croatian Third Football League
15	Sloga Čakovec (R)	30	6	3	21	34	82	−48	21	Relegation to Croatian Third Football League
16	NAŠK (R)	30	6	3	21	30	85	−55	21	Relegation to Croatian Third Football League

Source: RSSSF.org
Rules for classification: 1) points; 2) goal difference; 3) number of goals scored.
(C) Champions; (R) Relegated

=== Results ===
Home \ Away	BED	BEL	BJE	GRV	IVA	KOP	MET	MLA	NAŠK	OML	PAP	POD	SČK	SNG	VAL	VUK
Bedem Ivankovo		3–1	4–0	1–0	2–2	3–2	1–1	3–2	4–2	1–2	4–1	2–0	1–0	0–2	0–2	0–1
Belišće	7–1		4–0	2–0	1–1	3–0	0–1	3–0	1–0	2–0	1–0	8–0	3–0	3–0	0–0	2–2
Bjelovar	2–0	3–2		1–2	1–1	2–1	0–3	1–2	0–1	5–0	6–1	0–1	4–0	1–2	3–2	2–1
Grafičar Vodovod	3–0	1–2	2–0		2–1	3–2	2–0	1–1	3–1	3–1	3–0	2–0	4–0	1–1	2–0	1–2
Ivančica Ivanec	1–0	0–1	0–1	3–2		1–1	2–3	2–2	1–2	5–3	2–0	2–0	3–0	0–1	0–1	0–3
Koprivnica	1–0	2–3	2–0	2–1	2–1		0–1	4–1	3–0	0–0	4–1	4–3	4–3	3–1	2–2	1–3
Metalac Osijek	3–3	1–2	0–0	2–0	2–1	0–1		2–2	1–0	2–1	2–1	2–0	5–1	1–0	2–1	0–5
Mladost Molve	1–0	0–0	2–6	2–1	0–2	2–2	0–0		5–0	0–1	1–0	0–0	7–1	3–1	2–0	3–2
NAŠK	3–2	2–4	0–0	0–1	0–1	0–6	1–2	2–2		4–2	3–2	1–2	2–1	1–7	0–4	0–10
Omladinac NSR	4–2	3–1	1–4	1–1	4–1	2–5	2–0	3–1	5–1		1–1	1–1	3–1	1–0	3–1	2–1
Papuk Orahovica	1–0	2–3	2–0	2–0	3–2	0–3	1–2	2–0	1–1	2–0		3–0	2–0	2–1	1–1	0–2
Podravac	1–0	2–6	1–1	2–1	1–0	3–1	2–2	0–1	1–0	3–1	4–2		2–0	1–2	2–1	3–5
Sloga Čakovec	2–1	1–2	2–1	1–1	0–0	1–3	3–1	1–1	3–2	2–3	2–5	1–3		3–2	1–3	2–0
Sloga Nova Gradiška	1–0	0–3	1–2	0–1	4–0	1–1	4–1	0–0	7–0	4–2	2–1	3–3	5–1		2–0	3–5
Valpovka	1–1	0–3	3–2	1–1	1–0	3–2	1–0	2–1	1–0	3–1	6–1	2–0	4–1	3–3		4–1
Vukovar '91	5–0	1–1	4–1	4–1	2–0	2–0	3–1	4–1	3–1	3–1	1–0	2–0	5–0	3–0	2–0	

Source: RSSSF.org
Legend: Blue = home team win; Yellow = draw; Red = away team win.

== South Division ==
=== Clubs ===
Club	City / Town	Stadium	Capacity	1999–2000 result
Croatia Sesvete	Sesvete	Stadion ŠRC Sesvete	3,500	
GOŠK Dubrovnik	Dubrovnik	Stadion Lapad	7,000	
Imotska Krajina	Proložac	Stadion Šarampov	1,000	
Inker Zaprešić	Zaprešić	ŠRC Zaprešić	4,528	
Istra Pula	Pula	Stadion Aldo Drosina	7,000	
Mosor	Žrnovnica	Stadion Pricviće	3,000	
Novalja	Novalja	Cissa Strasko	2,000	
Orijent	Rijeka	SC Krimeja	4,000	
PIK Vrbovec	Vrbovec	Gradski stadion kraj Sajmišta	3,000	
Samobor	Samobor	Gradski stadion Samobor	5,000	
Segesta	Sisak	Gradski stadion Sisak	8,000	
Solin Građa	Solin	Stadion pokraj Jadra	4,000	
Trnje	Zagreb	SC Trnje	1,000	
Uljanik Pula	Pula	Stadion Veruda	3,000	
Uskok Klis	Klis	Iza grada	2,000	
Žminj	Žminj	Igralište Žminja	1,000	

In January 2002, Imotska Krajina and Imotski merged into a one club, where Imotski replaced Imotska Krajina in the second part of the Druga HNL season.

=== League table ===
Pos	Team	Pld	W	D	L	GF	GA	GD	Pts	Promotion or relegation
1	Istra Pula (C)	30	17	8	5	46	21	+25	59	Qualification to promotion play-off
2	Uljanik	30	17	8	5	57	26	+31	59	
3	Novalja	30	14	8	8	30	18	+12	50	
4	Uskok Klis	30	14	7	9	48	32	+16	49	
5	Solin Građa	30	13	9	8	44	24	+20	48	
6	Orijent	30	14	4	12	35	37	−2	46	
7	Croatia Sesvete	30	13	6	11	33	29	+4	45	
8	Inker Zaprešić	30	11	8	11	46	40	+6	41	
9	GOŠK Dubrovnik	30	11	8	11	26	37	−11	41	
10	Imotski (O)	30	12	4	14	36	39	−3	40	Qualification to relegation play-off
11	Mosor (R)	30	10	7	13	38	50	−12	37	Relegation to Croatian Third Football League
12	Žminj (R)	30	11	3	16	25	43	−18	36	Relegation to Croatian Third Football League
13	Segesta (R)	30	9	8	13	28	33	−5	35	Relegation to Croatian Third Football League
14	Samobor (R)	30	8	7	15	31	40	−9	31	Relegation to Croatian Third Football League
15	Trnje (R)	30	5	11	14	30	43	−13	26	Relegation to Croatian Third Football League
16	PIK Vrbovec (R)	30	7	2	21	23	64	−41	23	Relegation to Croatian Third Football League

Source: RSSSF.org
Rules for classification: 1) points; 2) goal difference; 3) number of goals scored.
(C) Champions; (O) Play-off winners; (R) Relegated

=== Results ===
Home \ Away	SES	GOŠK	INK	IMO	IST	MOS	NOV	ORI	SAM	SEG	SOL	TRN	ULJ	USK	VRB	ŽMI
Croatia Sesvete		2–0	1–0	2–2	1–0	4–1	1–0	0–0	0–2	1–0	0–0	0–1	2–5	3–2	0–1	2–0
GOŠK Dubrovnik	3–0		1–0	3–0	3–1	1–1	0–1	0–3	2–1	0–1	0–0	1–1	1–0	1–0	0–0	1–0
Inker Zaprešić	2–1	1–1		2–0	0–3	1–0	2–1	5–3	7–1	2–0	1–3	4–3	1–1	0–0	5–0	0–1
Imotski	0–0	3–0	1–1		0–1	2–1	1–3	4–1	0–2	3–2	1–0	2–0	3–2	0–2	4–1	3–0
Istra Pula	3–0	4–0	0–0	0–0		3–1	3–0	2–0	1–1	3–0	3–3	1–0	0–1	2–0	2–1	1–0
Mosor	1–3	1–1	1–1	0–3	2–2		3–1	2–1	1–0	1–1	1–0	1–1	3–1	1–2	2–0	3–1
Novalja	1–0	0–1	3–1	3–1	0–0	3–0		4–0	1–0	2–1	0–0	0–0	0–0	2–0	1–0	1–0
Orijent	1–0	1–0	1–0	2–0	0–2	2–1	1–0		0–0	1–0	1–0	1–1	1–2	3–1	2–0	2–0
Samobor	0–0	7–0	2–2	1–0	1–2	2–1	0–1	0–2		0–0	0–2	2–1	2–2	1–2	1–2	0–1
Segesta	0–2	1–0	2–3	3–0	1–1	0–1	1–1	0–1	0–0		3–0	1–0	1–1	2–1	2–0	1–3
Solin Građa	0–0	3–0	0–0	0–1	2–0	3–0	1–0	3–1	4–0	0–0		2–0	1–6	1–2	3–0	5–0
Trnje	0–4	1–1	2–1	0–1	0–0	2–2	0–0	1–0	0–1	1–2	1–4		0–0	2–3	2–2	4–0
Uljanik	1–0	0–0	5–1	1–0	0–2	1–2	0–0	4–1	2–1	3–1	2–1	3–1		0–0	5–0	2–0
Uskok Klis	3–1	2–0	1–0	3–1	3–0	5–1	0–1	1–1	2–0	0–0	1–1	1–1	0–2		3–1	5–0
PIK Vrbovec	0–2	1–2	1–3	2–0	1–2	1–3	1–0	2–1	0–4	1–0	0–2	0–3	1–4	3–2		0–1
Žminj	0–1	3–1	1–0	2–0	0–2	2–0	0–0	2–1	2–0	1–2	0–0	3–1	0–1	1–1	3–1	

Source: RSSSF.org
Legend: Blue = home team win; Yellow = draw; Red = away team win.

== See also ==
- 2001–02 Prva HNL
- 2001–02 Croatian Cup
