= 1997–98 Croatian Second Football League =

Druga HNL
- Season: 1997–98
- Champions: Čakovec (North Division); Cibalia (East Division); Segesta (Center Division); Jadran Poreč (West Division); RNK Split (South Division)
- Promoted: Cibalia
- Relegated: 64 clubs

The 1997–98 Druga HNL (also known as 2. HNL) season was the 7th season of Croatia's second-level football since its establishment in 1992.

The league consisted of 82 teams organized into three geographic groups: Sjever (North, 16 teams), Istok (East, 16 teams), Središte (Center, 17 teams), Zapad (West, 16 teams), and Jug (South, 17 teams).

== North Division ==
Pos	Team	Pld	W	D	L	GF	GA	GD	Pts	Qualification or relegation
1	Čakovec (C)	30	27	2	1	100	19	+81	83	Qualification to promotion play-offs
2	Budućnost Hodošan	30	25	3	2	96	22	+74	78	
3	Bjelovar	30	19	4	7	71	36	+35	61	
4	Sloboda Varaždin (R)	30	16	8	6	50	21	+29	56	Relegation to Croatian Third Football League
5	Čazmatrans Čazma (R)	30	14	9	7	53	27	+26	51	Relegation to Croatian Third Football League
6	Podravac Virje (R)	30	14	5	11	53	44	+9	47	Relegation to Croatian Third Football League
7	Mladost-Nada Hrastovac (R)	30	12	10	8	44	36	+8	46	Relegation to Croatian Third Football League
8	Tišljar Ivančica (R)	30	12	6	12	47	55	−8	42	Relegation to Croatian Third Football League
9	Podravina Ludbreg (R)	30	9	10	11	37	35	+2	37	Relegation to Croatian Third Football League
10	Omladinac Novo Selo Rok (R)	30	8	9	13	35	47	−12	33	Relegation to Croatian Third Football League
11	Spartak Vest Mala Subotica (R)	30	9	4	17	32	56	−24	31	Relegation to Croatian Third Football League
12	Graničar Jakovina Đurđevac (R)	30	6	5	19	26	78	−52	23	Relegation to Croatian Third Football League
13	Daruvar Gradolit (R)	30	6	4	20	29	94	−65	22	Relegation to Croatian Third Football League
14	Mladost Ždralovi (R)	30	5	6	19	24	57	−33	21	Relegation to Croatian Third Football League
15	Križevci (R)	30	5	4	21	17	52	−35	19	Relegation to Croatian Third Football League
16	Polet Pribislavec (Note: Polet Pribislavec were deducted three points.) (R)	30	5	7	18	28	63	−35	19	Relegation to Croatian Third Football League

Source: RSSSF.org
(C) Champions; (R) Relegated

== East Division ==
Pos	Team	Pld	W	D	L	GF	GA	GD	Pts	Qualification or relegation
1	Cibalia (C, P)	30	22	5	3	80	19	+61	71	Qualification to promotion play-offs
2	Belišće	30	21	6	3	68	21	+47	69	
3	Croatia Đakovo	30	20	7	3	65	23	+42	67	
4	Otok	30	19	5	6	59	26	+33	62	
5	Slavonija Požega (R)	30	14	4	12	51	38	+13	46	Relegation to Croatian Third Football League
6	Marsonia (R)	30	13	7	10	38	37	+1	46	Relegation to Croatian Third Football League
7	Satnica (R)	30	12	2	16	41	55	−14	38	Relegation to Croatian Third Football League
8	Olimpija Osijek (R)	30	9	7	14	31	36	−5	34	Relegation to Croatian Third Football League
9	Baranja Beli Manastir (R)	30	10	3	17	38	57	−19	33	Relegation to Croatian Third Football League
10	Graničar Županja (R)	30	9	6	15	28	47	−19	33	Relegation to Croatian Third Football League
11	Čepin (R)	30	10	3	17	34	63	−29	33	Relegation to Croatian Third Football League
12	Amater Slavonski Brod (R)	30	8	8	14	42	59	−17	32	Relegation to Croatian Third Football League
13	Đakovo (R)	30	9	4	17	29	59	−30	31	Relegation to Croatian Third Football League
14	NAŠK Našicecement (R)	30	8	5	17	37	52	−15	29	Relegation to Croatian Third Football League
15	Dilj (R)	30	7	7	16	35	53	−18	28	Relegation to Croatian Third Football League
16	Mladost Cernik (R)	30	8	3	19	28	59	−31	27	Relegation to Croatian Third Football League

Source: RSSSF.org
(C) Champions; (P) Promoted; (R) Relegated

== Center Division ==
Pos	Team	Pld	W	D	L	GF	GA	GD	Pts	Qualification or relegation
1	Segesta (C)	32	21	7	4	71	15	+56	70	Qualification to promotion play-offs
2	Zagorec Krapina	32	21	7	4	79	20	+59	70	
3	Posavina	32	21	4	7	72	21	+51	67	
4	Inker Zaprešić	32	21	4	7	62	29	+33	67	
5	Badel Sesvete	32	20	6	6	66	28	+38	66	
6	Radnik Velika Gorica (R)	32	16	10	6	47	27	+20	58	Relegation to Croatian Third Football League
7	PIK Vrbovec (R)	32	15	12	5	56	24	+32	57	Relegation to Croatian Third Football League
8	Špansko (R)	32	15	8	9	52	36	+16	53	Relegation to Croatian Third Football League
9	Mladost Petrinja (R)	32	11	8	13	42	40	+2	41	Relegation to Croatian Third Football League
10	Regeneracija Mladost Zabok (R)	32	11	8	13	43	51	−8	41	Relegation to Croatian Third Football League
11	Ponikve (R)	32	11	4	17	47	60	−13	37	Relegation to Croatian Third Football League
12	Karlovac (R)	32	7	6	19	36	59	−23	27	Relegation to Croatian Third Football League
13	Metalac Sisak (R)	32	4	14	14	40	54	−14	26	Relegation to Croatian Third Football League
14	Lokomotiva Zagreb (R)	32	7	5	20	29	53	−24	26	Relegation to Croatian Third Football League
15	Lučko (R)	32	7	3	22	31	88	−57	24	Relegation to Croatian Third Football League
16	Dinamo Odranski Obrež (R)	32	6	5	21	41	89	−48	23	Relegation to Croatian Third Football League
17	Velika Mlaka (Note: Velika Mlaka were deducted two points.) (R)	32	1	3	28	11	131	−120	4	Relegation to Croatian Third Football League

Source: RSSSF.org
(C) Champions; (R) Relegated

== West Division ==
Pos	Team	Pld	W	D	L	GF	GA	GD	Pts	Qualification or relegation
1	Jadran Poreč (C)	30	22	6	2	75	20	+55	72	Qualification to promotion play-offs
2	Istra Pula	30	22	3	5	89	30	+59	69	
3	Orijent	30	21	5	4	63	15	+48	68	
4	Pomorac (R)	30	19	5	6	70	17	+53	62	Relegation to Croatian Third Football League
5	Gospić '91 (R)	30	11	12	7	47	28	+19	45	Relegation to Croatian Third Football League
6	Uljanik (R)	30	12	7	11	42	31	+11	43	Relegation to Croatian Third Football League
7	Halubjan Viškovo (R)	30	11	8	11	33	50	−17	41	Relegation to Croatian Third Football League
8	Nehaj Senj (R)	30	11	7	12	40	44	−4	40	Relegation to Croatian Third Football League
9	Pazinka (R)	30	12	4	14	41	57	−16	40	Relegation to Croatian Third Football League
10	Žminj (R)	29	10	7	12	40	40	0	37	Relegation to Croatian Third Football League
11	Opatija (R)	30	8	10	12	43	39	+4	34	Relegation to Croatian Third Football League
12	Rovinj (R)	30	8	8	14	34	51	−17	32	Relegation to Croatian Third Football League
13	Rudar Labin (R)	30	8	6	16	37	62	−25	30	Relegation to Croatian Third Football League
14	Grobničan (R)	30	7	7	16	28	44	−16	28	Relegation to Croatian Third Football League
15	Buje (R)	29	3	5	21	27	90	−63	14	Relegation to Croatian Third Football League
16	Vrbovsko (R)	29	2	4	23	18	109	−91	4	Relegation to Croatian Third Football League

Source: RSSSF.org
(C) Champions; (R) Relegated

== South Division ==
Pos	Team	Pld	W	D	L	GF	GA	GD	Pts	Qualification or relegation
1	RNK Split (C)	32	21	5	6	52	19	+33	68	Qualification to promotion play-offs
2	Solin	32	18	9	5	51	25	+26	63	
3	Mladost Imotska krajina	32	19	6	7	43	31	+12	63	
4	Junak (R)	32	18	7	7	55	32	+23	61	Relegation to Croatian Third Football League
5	Uskok Klis (R)	32	17	6	9	58	44	+14	57	Relegation to Croatian Third Football League
6	Mosor (Note: Mosor and Prevlaka Gruda were deducted one point.) (R)	32	15	8	9	51	33	+18	52	Relegation to Croatian Third Football League
7	Prevlaka Gruda (R)	32	14	10	8	48	27	+21	51	Relegation to Croatian Third Football League
8	Neretva (R)	32	13	4	15	42	34	+8	43	Relegation to Croatian Third Football League
9	Hrvatski vitez Posedarje (R)	32	12	4	16	37	37	0	40	Relegation to Croatian Third Football League
10	Dubrovnik (R)	32	10	8	14	26	40	−14	38	Relegation to Croatian Third Football League
11	Jadran Kaštel Sućurac (R)	32	8	10	14	30	49	−19	34	Relegation to Croatian Third Football League
12	Omiš (R)	32	10	4	18	32	55	−23	34	Relegation to Croatian Third Football League
13	Val Kaštel Stari (R)	32	10	3	19	32	53	−21	33	Relegation to Croatian Third Football League
14	Zmaj Makarska (R)	32	8	9	15	37	50	−13	33	Relegation to Croatian Third Football League
15	Jadran NGB Ploče (R)	32	8	7	17	26	46	−20	31	Relegation to Croatian Third Football League
16	Primorac AM Stobreč (R)	32	7	7	18	22	42	−20	28	Relegation to Croatian Third Football League
17	Raštane (R)	32	7	7	18	33	58	−25	28	Relegation to Croatian Third Football League

Source: RSSSF.org
(C) Champions; (R) Relegated

== Promotion play-offs ==
=== Group 1 ===
Pos	Team	Pld	W	D	L	GF	GA	GD	Pts	Qualification
1	Segesta	2	1	1	0	4	3	+1	4	Advanced to the final
2	Jadran Poreč	2	0	2	0	2	2	0	2	
3	Čakovec	2	0	1	1	1	2	−1	1	

Source: RSSSF.org
- Segesta – Jadran Poreč 2–2
- Jadran Poreč – Čakovec 0–0
- Čakovec – Segesta 1–2

=== Group 2 ===
Pos	Team	Pld	W	D	L	GF	GA	GD	Pts	Qualification
1	Cibalia	2	1	1	0	4	3	+1	4	Advanced to the final
2	Zagorec Krapina	2	1	1	0	3	2	+1	4	
3	RNK Split	2	0	0	2	1	3	−2	0	

Source: RSSSF.org
- RNK Split – Zagorec Krapina 0–1
- Cibalia – RNK Split 2–1
- Zagorec Krapina – Cibalia 2–2

=== Final ===
3 June 1998

Cibalia	2–1	Segesta
Crnčević 12'; Bojko 35'	Report (p. 15)	Radišić 21'

Stadion Kranjčevićeva, Zagreb
Referee: Alojzije Šupraha (Kolan)

Cibalia was promoted to the Croatian First Football League.

=== Additional match ===
7 June 1998

Mladost 127	2–0	Segesta
Džafić 75'; Lončarević 89'	Report (p. 11)

Stadion Kranjčevićeva, Zagreb
Attendance: 1,500
Referee: Veljko Malovac (Rijeka)
