= Football in Croatia =

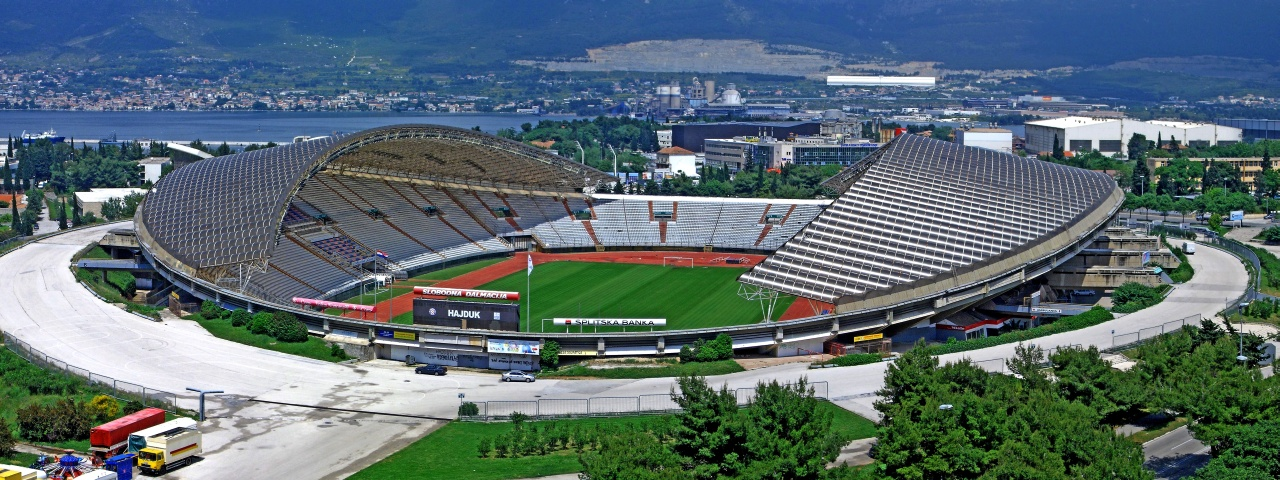
- Home stadium of club Hajduk Split, a club on the coast of Split
- Country: Croatia
- Governing body: Croatian Football Federation
- National teams: men's national team women's national team

National competitions
- HNL; 1. NL; 2. NL; 3. NL; First County; Croatian Cup; Croatian Super Cup

Club competitions
- UEFA Champions League; UEFA Europa League; UEFA Europa Conference League; UEFA Super Cup; FIFA Club World Cup

International competitions
- FIFA World Cup; UEFA European Championship; UEFA Nations League

Football is Croatia's most popular sport. The Croatian Football Federation is the governing body and is responsible for overseeing all aspects of football in the nation, both professional and amateur. The national and club teams are governed by UEFA in Europe and FIFA in global competitions. The history of the sport is delineated by a variety of unofficial sides as Croatia was not an independent entity until the late 20th century. Since the 21st century, Croatia has been a leading exporter of football players to European and South American leagues.

The club teams that compete domestically do so in the top flight, the Croatian Football League (Hrvatska nogometna liga), the second-tier, First Football League (Prva NL), the third-tier, Second Football League (Druga NL), and fourth-tier Third Football League (Treća NL). The counties of Croatia likewise compete in a regional league system. Club teams contest their respective league championships, the Croatian Cup, and the Croatian Super Cup. The "Big Four" clubs are Dinamo Zagreb, Hajduk Split, Rijeka, and Osijek.

The national team of Croatia is a major presence in European and world football. They have qualified for every major tournament with the exception of Euro 2000 and the 2010 World Cup. Croatia has reached the quarter-finals of the UEFA European Championship twice (1996, 2008) and finished second and earned a silver medal in the UEFA Nations League in 2023. At the FIFA World Cup, Croatia were the runners-up once (2018) and third on two occasions (1998, 2022), securing three World Cup medals.

== History ==
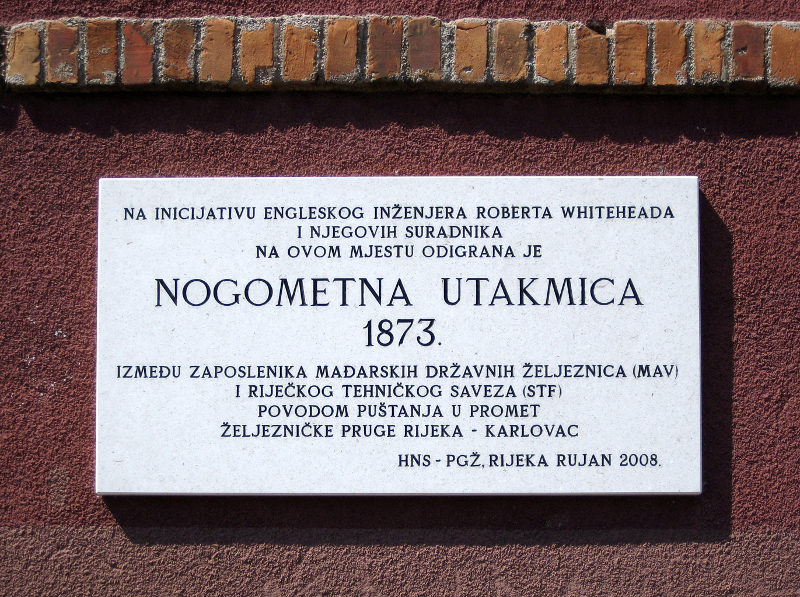
A plaque in Rijeka marking the site of the 1873 football game

The earliest record of football in Croatia dates from 1873, when English engineers and technicians for Stabilimento tecnico Fiumano played in Rijeka against the engineers building the local railway line, with local Fiumans also taking part in the game. The first recorded football match in the Kingdom of Croatia was played in 1880 in Županja, between English workers of The Oak Extract Company and local youths. In 1890 the first school-based football clubs are founded by high school students in Rijeka. The sport was further popularized in Croatia by Franjo Bučar in the 1890s. The Croatian translation of the sport's name, nogomet, was coined by the linguist Slavko Rutzner Radmilović in 1893 or 1894. The name was adopted into Slovenian as well. In 1896, the first edition of the Rules of the Football Game in Croatian was printed in Zagreb.

The earliest officially registered association football clubs were founded in Pula before the turn of the century, when in August 1899 the locals founded Club Iris and later in the same year Veloce Club, both multi-sport association with very popular football sections. The first clubs to be founded in the then Kingdom of Croatia-Slavonia per se were HAŠK and PNIŠK, in 1903. In Rijeka, the Hungarian-leaning Fiumei Atletikai Club was founded in 1905 and the multicultural CS Olimpia in 1904, but Olimpia's football section may have held its first seating only in 1906 (the date is still debated among historians). In the same year, the Giovine Fiume club was founded by the Italian irredentist youth of the city and HŠK Concordia was established in Zagreb.

The first public football match in Croatia was played on Marulić Square in Zagreb on October 28, 1906 between HAŠK and PNIŠK and ended with a score of 1:1. This match was played according to the then only valid English rules. The HAŠK team then consisted of the following players: Hinko Würth, Josip Besednik, Hugo Kuderna, Josip Novak, Ivo Lipovšćak, Anđelo Grgić, Marko Kostrenčić, Dragutin Albrecht, Marko Kren, Vladimir Erbežnik, Zvonimir Bogdanović; while the following played for PNIŠK: Dragutin Baki, Jan Todl, Veljko Ugrinić, Schreiber, Kiseljak, Pilepić and Uhrl.

Among the other early clubs are Victoria and Olimpija Karlovac, created in 1908. 1908 also saw the first recorded win by a Croatian city-based club against an English side, when CS Olimpia beat the official football team of the Cunard Line ship RMS Brescia 1-0. In 1909 GŠK Marsonia started playing in Slavonski Brod and Rijeka's then strongest side Fiumei AC was invited to play officially in the Hungarian Championship, but turned down the offer. In the same year, HNK Segesta officially appeared for the first time in Sisak.

In 1910 the club Forza e Coraggio was founded in Dubrovnik and the Società Ginnastica e Scherma in Zadar officially opened its football section. The two would battle in the first Dalmatian Championship in 1911, won by Forza e Coraggio, which was then forced by the authorities to change its name to U.S. Ragusa. Hajduk, Građanski and SK Opatija were all founded in the same year, 1911. The first football club to be founded purely by Croats was Bačka in Subotica in 1901, in what was then the Kingdom of Hungary and is today Serbia. In Bosnia and Herzegovina, Zrinjski Mostar was founded by Croats in 1905 and was the first club to be founded in that country. The Croatian Football Federation (HNS) itself was created in 1912, which was also the year of the first Croatia and Slavonia championship.

The football section of HŠS 1912-13. organized the first Croatian football championship, in which clubs exclusively from Zagreb, Građanski, HAŠK, Concordia, AŠK Croatia and Tipografski športski klub Zagreb participated. This first championship was not completed due to unsportsmanlike behavior, and the new one was interrupted in 1914 due to the war. In 1912 the Dalmatian championship was won by Società Bersaglieri and in its third season by Calcio Spalato, who then played and lost against the strongest club from the Trieste region, Edera.

Teams from the Republic of Croatia which competed in the Yugoslavian football championship from 1923–1940

After World War I, Croats played a major part in the founding of the first football federation of the Kingdom of Serbs, Croats and Slovenes, later named the Football Association of Yugoslavia. Its headquarters were initially in Zagreb before moving to Belgrade in 1929. This was an era when great talents like Ico Hitrec dominated the national fields. In 1927, Hajduk Split took part in the inaugural Mitropa Cup, a tournament dedicated to the best Central European clubs.

Croatia itself played its first international football match as a representative team of the Banovina in a match held on April 2, 1940 against Switzerland. During World War II, the Croatian Football Federation joined FIFA as a representative of the Independent State of Croatia, but this was contentious and short-lived, as was the fascist puppet-state of which it was part. After the war, football was resumed within the institutional framework of the second Yugoslavia. The communist regime in the new state quickly moved to apply a damnatio memoriae to all club names and brands involved in the Croatian or Italian championships or which bore obviously Croatian or Italian national names. The government in Belgrade justified the rearrangement of all local football clubs with its plan to copy the Stalinist model of athletic organisation, merging all local clubs into omni-comprehensive sport unions—often forcing local institutions and party representatives to enact a total rebranding of the local clubs' identities—and thus bring them into line with communist goals and ideals.

Following these policies, Građanski was rebranded into NK Dinamo Zagreb, U.S. Fiumana (CS Olimpia's name under the Italian fascist regime) became S.C.F. Quarnero in Yugoslavia, ŽŠK Victoria became NK Lokomotiva in Zagreb, and dozens of other less famous clubs followed suit. Most clubs had henceforth to explicitly display loyalty to the new regime, and it was common for them to feature the communist red star as part of a new emblem, often paired with proletarian sounding and appealing identities. Among the victims of these changes, some clubs were completely disbanded, including top sides Concordia, PNIŠK and HAŠK, as well as major ethnic Croat clubs in today's Bosnia and Herzegovina, SAŠK and HŠK Zrinjski Mostar. One of the very few large Croatian clubs to avoid restructuring was Hajduk Split, who had refused to participate in the fascist Croatian competition and had strong links with the partisan army of Tito.

As Tito broke with Stalin, in the 1950s most sport unions reverted to purely football clubs. Over the following decades, Croatian clubs performed well in the Yugoslav First League and the Yugoslav Cup. Hajduk and Dinamo formed one half of the Big Four of Yugoslav football (the other two being FK Partizan and Red Star Belgrade). Rijeka won 2 Yugoslav cups. In 1967, Zlatko Čajkovski of German club Bayern Munich became the only Croatian manager to win the European Cup Winners' Cup. After Croatia gained independence in the 1990s, the football federation was reconstituted and joined the international associations. The Croatian internationals from the 1987 FIFA World Youth Championship-winning team went on to achieve more success, spawning the "golden generation" who finished in third place at the 1998 FIFA World Cup. Since then, Croatia has continued to produce top players. At the more recent Euro 2008, they beat 2006 FIFA World Cup bronze medalists Germany 2–1 in a shock win but exited the tournament courtesy of a penalty shoot-out defeat to Turkey in the quarterfinals. The national team's best performance came at the 2018 World Cup, where they finished as runners-up, losing 2–4 to France in the final. 38% of Croats watched the 2018 FIFA World Cup final. Croatia followed the achievement by again finishing third in the 2022 World Cup, after a 2–1 win over Morocco.

== Earliest clubs in Croatia ==
Club	Year	City, Region	Description	Dissolution
Club Iris	1899	Pula, Austrian Littoral	Football section opened in August 1899. Dissolution date unknown.	–
Veloce Club Polese	1899	Pula, Austrian Littoral	Football section of cycling club. Dissolution date unknown.	–
PNIŠK	1903	Zagreb, Kingdom of Croatia-Slavonia		1909
HAŠK	1903	Zagreb, Kingdom of Croatia-Slavonia		1945
Club Sportivo Olimpia	1904	Rijeka, Corpus Separatum	Later renamed to NK Rijeka.	Active
Fiumei Atletikai Club	1905	Rijeka, Corpus Separatum	Dissolution date unknown.	–
Segesta Sisak	1906	Sisak, Kingdom of Croatia-Slavonia		Active
Giovine Fiume	1906	Rijeka, Corpus Separatum		1912
HŠK Concordia	1906	Zagreb, Kingdom of Croatia-Slavonia		1945
Törekves SE	1907	Rijeka, Corpus Separatum	Dissolution date unknown.	–
AŠK Croatia	1907	Zagreb, Kingdom of Croatia-Slavonia		1945
HŠK Victoria Sušak	1908	Sušak, Kingdom of Croatia-Slavonia		1948
GŠK Marsonia	1909	Slavonski Brod, Kingdom of Croatia-Slavonia		Active
Associazione Sportiva Edera	1910	Pula, Austrian Littoral		1926
Forza e Coraggio	1910	Dubrovnik, Kingdom of Dalmatia	In 1912 renamed Unione Sportiva di Ragusa. Dissolution date unknown.	–
Società Ginnastica e Scherma Zara	1910	Zadar, Kingdom of Dalmatia	Dissolution date unknown.	–
NK Zmaj	1910	Zadar, Kingdom of Dalmatia	Later renamed in NK Arbanasi.	Active
Calcio Spalato	1910	Split, Kingdom of Dalmatia	Dissolved in the '20s	'20s
Nogometni Odjel Sokola Opatija - Volosko	1911	Opatija, Austrian Littoral	Later renamed NK Opatija.	Active
1. HŠK Građanski	1911	Zagreb, Kingdom of Croatia-Slavonia	Later renamed to NK Dinamo.	Active
Unione Sportiva	1911	Dubrovnik, Kingdom of Dalmatia	Dissolution date unknown.	–
NK DAVOR	1911	Dubrovnik, Kingdom of Dalmatia	Dissolution date unknown.	–
HŠK Hajduk	1911	Split, Kingdom of Dalmatia		Active
DFV Vorwärts Abbazia	1912	Opatija, Austrian Littoral	German minority club. Official dissolution date unknown.	–
Tornai SE	1912	Rijeka, Corpus Separatum	Hungarian minority club. Official dissolution date unknown.	–
HRŠD Anarh	1912	Split, Kingdom of Dalmatia	Later renamed to RNK Split.	Active
HŠK Slaven	1912	Koprivnica, Kingdom of Croatia-Slavonia		Active
Olimpija Suhopolje	1912	Suhopolje, Kingdom of Croatia-Slavonia		1916
SK Lav	1913	Knin, Kingdom of Croatia-Slavonia	Later renamed to HNK Dinara.	Active
HŠK Šparta	1913	Zagreb, Kingdom of Croatia-Slavonia	Later renamed to NK Šparta-Elektra.	Active

== Clubs in European competitions ==
- Hajduk Split is the only Croatian club to date—either during the Yugoslav period or since independence—to have played in the knockout stages of the European Cup or UEFA Champions League, having reached the quarter-finals on three occasions (in 1975–76, 1979–80 and 1994–95).
- Dinamo Zagreb have qualified for the Champions League group stage on eight occasions (in 1998–99, 1999–2000, 2011–12, 2012–13, 2015–16, 2016–17 , 2019–20 and 2022–23) but have yet to progress further.
- Both Dinamo and Hajduk have advanced past the round of sixteen of the UEFA Cup or UEFA Europa League, Hajduk played in the semi-finals in 1983–84 and the quarterfinals in 1985–86. They also reached the UEFA Cup's last sixteen in 1981–82 and 1986–87, while Dinamo Zagreb reached the quarterfinals in 2020–21 and the last sixteen in 1997–98 and 2018–19.
- Dinamo Zagreb had success winning the Inter-Cities Fairs Cup in 1967 which is the only European trophy won by Croatian clubs. Dinamo also reached the final four years earlier in 1963 but suffered a loss to Valencia. In 1970–71 season, they reached third round. Croatian clubs also had success in the defunct UEFA Cup Winners' Cup. Both Dinamo Zagreb (1960–61) and Hajduk Split (1972–73) reached the semi-finals of the competitions. Dinamo have also reached the quarterfinals in 1964–65 and 1969–70, while Hajduk were eliminated at that stage in 1977–78. UEFA Cup Winners' Cup is also the only European competition that has seen Croatian clubs other than Dinamo and Hajduk reach the advanced stages. Rijeka reached the quarterfinals in the 1979–80 edition, while Varteks advanced to the quarterfinals in 1998–99, the last edition of the competition.

=== Best results ===
The table below lists Croatian clubs' best results in elimination rounds of European club competitions:

Competition	Season	Round	Team 1	Agg.	Team 2	1st leg	2nd leg
UCWC	1960–61	SF	Fiorentina (Italy)	4–2	(Socialist Federal Republic of Yugoslavia) Dinamo Zagreb	3–0	1–2
UCWC	1972–73	SF	Leeds United (England)	1–0	(Socialist Federal Republic of Yugoslavia) Hajduk Split	1–0	0–0
EC	1975–76	QF	Hajduk Split (Socialist Federal Republic of Yugoslavia)	2–3	(Netherlands) PSV Eindhoven	2–0	0–3 (aet)
EC	1979–80	QF	Hamburger SV (Germany)	3–3 (a)	(Socialist Federal Republic of Yugoslavia) Hajduk Split	1–0	2–3
UC	1983–84	SF	Hajduk Split (Socialist Federal Republic of Yugoslavia)	2–2 (a)	(England) Tottenham Hotspur	2–1	0–1
UCL	1994–95	QF	Hajduk Split (Croatia)	0–3	(Netherlands) Ajax	0–0	0–3
EL	2020–21	QF	Dinamo Zagreb (Croatia)	1–3	(Spain) Villarreal	0–1	1–2
UCWC	1998–99	QF	Varteks (Croatia)	1–3	(Spain) Mallorca	0–0	1–3

== Footballers in international club competitions ==
The following table lists all Croatian players who are credited to win an international final. As of 2026, a total of eleven Croatian players are credited as winning the Champions League: Alen Bokšić, Zvonimir Boban, Davor Šuker, Dario Šimić, Igor Bišćan, Mario Mandžukić, Luka Modrić, Ivan Rakitić, Mateo Kovačić, Dejan Lovren and Ivan Perišić, although Šimić, Bišćan and Lovren did not appear in the finals. In terms of appearances, fourteen players have played in the final (Bokšić, Boban, Šuker, Boris Živković, Marko Babić, Igor Tudor, Dado Pršo, Ivica Olić, Mandžukić, Modrić, Rakitić, Lovren, Perišić and Kovačić), but only five players appeared more than once – Bokšić (1993, 1997), Boban (1994, 1995), Olić (2010, 2012), Mandžukić (2013, 2017) and Modrić (2014, 2016, 2017, 2018, 2022, 2024). Two Croatian players have scored a goal in the final match, Mandžukić in the 2013 and 2017 final, and Rakitić in the 2015 final.

As of 2026, a total of nine Croatian players are credited as winning the Europa League: Mario Stanić, Ivica Olić, Ivica Križanac, Darijo Srna, Ivan Rakitić, Šime Vrsaljko, Mateo Kovačić, Kristijan Jakić and Mario Pašalić. The only Croatian player to have scored a goal in the final match was Nikola Kalinić in the 2015 final.

Ranking	Name	Team(s)	Years	CL	EL	SC	FCWC	CWC	IC	Total
1	Luka Modrić	Real Madrid	2014–2024	6	0	5	4	0	1	16
2	Mateo Kovačić	Real Madrid, Chelsea	2016–2021	4	1	3	3	0	0	11
3	Ivan Rakitić	Sevilla, Barcelona	2014–2023	1	2	1	1	0	0	5
4	Dario Šimić	Milan	2003–2007	2	0	1	1	0	0	4
5	Alen Bokšić	Marseille, Juventus, Lazio	1993–1999	1	0	0	0	1	1	3
5	Mario Mandžukić	Bayern Munich	2013	1	0	1	1	0	0	3
7	Zvonimir Boban	Milan	1994	1	0	1	0	0	0	2
7	Davor Šuker	Real Madrid	1998	1	0	0	0	0	1	2
7	Igor Bišćan	Liverpool	2001–2005	1	0	1	0	0	0	2
7	Ivica Križanac	Zenit Saint Petersburg	2008	0	1	1	0	0	0	2
11	Robert Jarni	Real Madrid	1998	0	0	0	0	0	1	1
11	Mario Stanić	Parma	1999	0	1	0	0	0	0	1
11	Niko Kovač	Bayern Munich	2001	0	0	0	0	0	1	1
11	Robert Kovač	Bayern Munich	2001	0	0	0	0	0	1	1
11	Ivica Olić	CSKA Moscow	2005	0	1	0	0	0	0	1
11	Darijo Srna	Shakhtar Donetsk	2009	0	1	0	0	0	0	1
11	Šime Vrsaljko	Atlético Madrid	2018	0	1	0	0	0	0	1
11	Nikola Kalinić	Atlético Madrid	2018	0	0	1	0	0	0	1
11	Dejan Lovren	Liverpool	2019	1	0	0	0	0	0	1
11	Ivan Perišić	Bayern Munich	2020	1	0	0	0	0	0	1
11	Kristijan Jakić	Eintracht Frankfurt	2022	0	1	0	0	0	0	1
11	Mario Pašalić	Atalanta	2024	0	1	0	0	0	0	1

Abolished competition

== Format ==
The governing body of football in Croatia is the Croatian Football Federation. It oversees the organization of:

- Leagues:
  - Croatian Football League (HNL)
  - Prva NL
  - Druga NL
  - Treća NL
  - Regional leagues
- Cup tournaments:
  - Croatian Cup
  - Croatian Supercup
- National teams:
  - Croatia national football team
  - Croatia national under-21 football team
  - Croatia national under-19 football team
  - Croatia national under-17 football team
  - Croatia women's national football team

== Seasons ==
The following articles detail major results and events in each footballing season since the early 1990s, when the Croatian First Football League was established. Each article provides final league standings for that season, as well as details on cup results, Croatia national football team results, and a summary of any other important events during the season.

1990s	1990–91	1991–92	1992–93	1993–94	1994–95	1995–96	1996–97	1997–98	1998–99	1999–2000
2000s	2000–01	2001–02	2002–03	2003–04	2004–05	2005–06	2006–07	2007–08	2008–09	2009–10
2010s	2010–11	2011–12	2012–13	2013–14	2014–15	2015–16	2016–17	2017–18	2018–19	2019–20
2020s	2020–21	2021–22	2022–23	2023–24						

== Teams ==
Club teams contest their respective league championships, the Croatian Cup, and the Croatian Super Cup. The "Big Four" clubs are Dinamo Zagreb, Hajduk Split, Rijeka, and Osijek.

== Futsal ==
Futsal, called mali nogomet (lit. "small football") in Croatia, is widely played and considered as a mini football league. It is often taught in schools and played by football professionals as a pastime. The Croatian First League of Futsal is the top-tier futsal competition where majority of Croatia national futsal team is selected. There are national competitions in minifootball formats.

== Fans ==
Croatian football fans organize in various fan groups such as the Torcida (Hajduk), Bad Blue Boys (Dinamo), Armada (Rijeka), Kohorta (Osijek), among others. In international games, Croatian fans usually wear the red and white found on the national checkerboard.

== Player market ==
Since the 21st century, Croatia has been a leading exporter of football players to European and South American leagues. It was the largest exporter of football players in the world as measured on a per capita basis in 2022. It ranked 8th globally for the number of footballers playing abroad from 2017 to 2022. Croatia remained a top exporter from 2022 to 2025.

== Attendance ==
The average attendance per top-flight football league season and the club with the highest average attendance:

Season	League average	Best club	Best club average
2024–25	5,678	Hajduk Split	22,028
2023–24	5,316	Hajduk Split	18,873
2022–23	4,085	Hajduk Split	15,345
2021–22	—	—	—
2020–21	—	—	—
2019–20	3,526	Hajduk Split	12,883
2018–19	2,659	Hajduk Split	8,651
2017–18	2,948	Hajduk Split	11,999
2016–17	2,750	Hajduk Split	8,340
2015–16	2,453	Hajduk Split	9,266
2014–15	2,874	Hajduk Split	8,056
2013–14	3,167	Hajduk Split	9,806
2012–13	2,446	Hajduk Split	9,029
2011–12	2,072	Hajduk Split	9,567
2010–11	1,991	Hajduk Split	6,933
2009–10	2,025	Hajduk Split	4,667
2008–09	3,074	Hajduk Split	9,471
2007–08	2,848	Dinamo Zagreb	7,165
2006–07	3,021	Hajduk Split	7,559
2005–06	3,084	Dinamo Zagreb	11,156
2004–05	2,682	Hajduk Split	7,750
2003–04	2,595	Hajduk Split	6,179
2002–03	3,313	Dinamo Zagreb	8,281
2001–02	2,453	Hajduk Split	4,720
2000–01	2,942	Hajduk Split	7,156
1999–2000	2,839	Hajduk Split	6,647
1998–99	4,050	Hajduk Split	11,875
1997–98	3,565	Dinamo Zagreb	7,419
1996–97	2,866	Dinamo Zagreb	6,100
1995–96	3,837	Hajduk Split	9,375
1994–95	3,664	Osijek	9,267
1993–94	2,783	Hajduk Split	6,647
1992–93	4,122	Dinamo Zagreb	15,400
1992	2,865	Hajduk Split	7,091

== See also ==
- Croatia at the FIFA World Cup
- Croatia at the UEFA European Championship
- Croatia at the UEFA Nations League

== Sources ==
- "Hrvatska". Nogometni leksikon (in Croatian). Miroslav Krleža Institute of Lexicography.
- Marković, Ivan (December 2012). "O počecima hrvatskoga nogometa" [On the beginnings of the Croatian word nogomet (E. football)] (PDF). Croatica (in Croatian). 6 [36] (6 [56]): 305–328.
