= 2023–24 Third Football League (Croatia) =

Treća NL
- Season: 2023–24
- Dates: 18 August 2023 – Spring 2024

The 2023–24 Croatian Third Football League (also known as Treća Nogometna Liga and 3. NL) was the 33rd edition of the fourth tier of Croatian football league and 2nd season of the restructured Treća nogometna liga.

2022–23 season was the first season, 2023–24 season being the second, where fourth tier competition is named Third Football League, and the first season where fourth tier competition was the highest competition divided in groups (traditionally it being third tier competition).

Winner of every group will qualify for the promotion qualifications, as well as the 14th placed team in Second Football League. Those six teams battled for 3 open spots in next seasons' Second Football League.

== Teams ==
The league is contested in 5 groups, based on geographic locations, by between 10 and 18 teams. Groups are based on centers: Varaždin (North), Rijeka (West), Zagreb (Center), Osijek (East) and Split (South).

Location of teams of the 2022–23 Treća NL.
Brown: North; Red: West; Yellow: Center;
Green: East; Blue: South.

== League tables ==
=== North ===
Pos	Team	Pld	W	D	L	GF	GA	GD	Pts	Qualification or relegation
1	Polet (SMnM) (Note: Polet (SMnM) did not get the licence for 2. NL 2024/2025) (C)	27	21	6	0	72	21	+51	69	
2	Rudar Mursko Središće	27	17	5	5	50	21	+29	56	
3	Pitomača	27	15	6	6	52	32	+20	51	
4	Varteks	27	13	7	7	48	26	+22	46	
5	Dinamo Domašinec	27	11	5	11	38	37	+1	38	
6	Međimurje	27	9	6	12	42	39	+3	33	
7	Graničar Kotoriba	27	8	2	17	33	60	−27	26	
8	Podravina Ludbreg	27	7	2	18	27	54	−27	23	
9	Virovitica	27	5	4	18	17	57	−40	19	
10	Koprivnica (R)	27	3	9	15	21	53	−32	18	Relegation

Updated to match(es) played on 3 June 2024. Source:
Rules for classification: 1) Points, 2) Head-to-head points, 3) Head-to-head goal difference, 4) Goal difference, 5) Matches won, 6) Goals scored
(C) Champions; (R) Relegated

=== West ===
Pos	Team	Pld	W	D	L	GF	GA	GD	Pts	Qualification or relegation
1	Uljanik (C)	26	18	3	5	45	21	+24	57	Promotion play-off
2	Rovinj	26	16	5	5	43	27	+16	53	
3	Vinodol	26	14	5	7	47	32	+15	47	
4	Nehaj	26	13	5	8	62	47	+15	44	
5	Pomorac 1921	26	11	8	7	45	37	+8	41	
6	Halubjan	26	11	7	8	58	38	+20	40	
7	Pazinka	26	11	2	13	36	40	−4	35	
8	Cres	26	10	4	12	31	44	−13	34	
9	Buje	26	9	6	11	41	45	−4	33	
10	Naprijed Hreljin	26	8	8	10	37	35	+2	32	
11	Kraljevica	26	10	1	15	41	51	−10	31	
12	Rudar Labin	26	7	6	13	38	39	−1	27	
13	Medulin 1921	26	6	3	17	28	64	−36	21	
14	Crikvenica (R)	26	5	3	18	25	57	−32	18	Relegation

Updated to match(es) played on 3 June 2024. Source:
Rules for classification: 1) Points, 2) Head-to-head points, 3) Head-to-head goal difference, 4) Goal difference, 5) Matches won, 6) Goals scored
(C) Champions; (R) Relegated

=== Center ===
Pos	Team	Pld	W	D	L	GF	GA	GD	Pts	Qualification or relegation
1	Segesta (C)	34	24	5	5	97	42	+55	77	Promotion play-off
2	Gaj Mače	34	18	10	6	71	51	+20	64	
3	Vrapče	34	18	6	10	70	50	+20	60	
4	Lučko	34	17	7	10	68	39	+29	58	
5	Ponikve	34	15	6	13	63	56	+7	51	
6	Maksimir	34	15	5	14	65	48	+17	50	
7	Zagorec Krapina	34	15	4	15	54	48	+6	49	
8	Lukavec	34	12	12	10	45	44	+1	48	
9	Samobor	34	13	8	13	52	53	−1	47	
10	Trešnjevka	34	12	11	11	55	58	−3	47	
11	HAŠK 1903	34	14	4	16	52	52	0	46	
12	Dinamo Odranski Obrež	34	13	6	15	52	67	−15	45	
13	Kurilovec	34	12	8	14	43	58	−15	44	
14	Bistra	34	12	5	17	48	62	−14	41	
15	Mladost Petrinja	34	11	7	16	44	63	−19	40	
16	Zelina	34	8	5	21	54	76	−22	29	
17	Sava Strmec	34	6	11	17	31	57	−26	29	
18	Tondach Bedekovčina (R)	34	7	8	19	42	82	−40	28 (Note: 1 point deducted due to decision by the Federation)	Relegation

Updated to match(es) played on 3 June 2024. Source:
Rules for classification: 1) Points, 2) Head-to-head points, 3) Head-to-head goal difference, 4) Goal difference, 5) Matches won, 6) Goals scored
(C) Champions; (R) Relegated

=== East ===
Pos	Team	Pld	W	D	L	GF	GA	GD	Pts	Qualification or relegation
1	Slavonija Požega (C)	30	20	3	7	61	30	+31	63	Promotion play-off
2	Čepin	30	17	6	7	50	37	+13	57	
3	Tomislav Donji Andrijevci	30	16	5	9	54	39	+15	53	
4	Đakovo Croatia	30	14	5	11	63	49	+14	47	
5	Vuteks Sloga	30	10	11	9	51	50	+1	41	
6	Bedem Ivankovo	30	11	7	12	40	36	+4	40	
7	NAŠK Našice	30	12	4	14	52	53	−1	40	
8	Svačić Stari Slatinik	30	11	6	13	40	38	+2	39	
9	Borac Kneževi Vinogradi	30	11	6	13	33	47	−14	39	
10	Tomislav Cerna	30	11	5	14	48	49	−1	38	
11	Valpovka	30	11	5	14	48	55	−7	38	
12	Graničar Županja	30	11	5	14	33	56	−23	38	
13	Sloga Nova Gradiška	30	10	6	14	47	46	+1	36	
14	Slavija Pleternica	30	10	6	14	42	49	−7	36	
15	Oriolik Oriovac	30	9	9	12	25	35	−10	36	
16	Kutjevo (R)	30	11	1	18	46	64	−18	34	Relegation

Updated to match(es) played on 3 June 2024. Source:
Rules for classification: 1) Points, 2) Head-to-head points, 3) Head-to-head goal difference, 4) Goal difference, 5) Matches won, 6) Goals scored
(C) Champions; (R) Relegated

=== South ===
Pos	Team	Pld	W	D	L	GF	GA	GD	Pts	Qualification or relegation
1	Zadar (C)	30	22	5	3	78	27	+51	71	Promotion play-off
2	Zagora Unešić	30	21	4	5	86	33	+53	67	
3	Junak Sinj	30	16	7	7	61	33	+28	55	
4	Hrvatski Vitez Posedarje	30	14	8	8	52	38	+14	50	
5	GOŠK Kaštela	30	13	7	10	46	35	+11	46	
6	Neretva Metković	30	12	6	12	59	54	+5	42	
7	Uskok Klis	30	11	8	11	41	40	+1	41	
8	Omiš	30	12	4	14	34	45	−11	40	
9	Primorac Biograd	30	10	7	13	35	35	0	37	
10	Vodice	30	10	7	13	49	54	−5	37	
11	Neretvanac Opuzen	30	9	10	11	39	55	−16	37	
12	Sloga Mravince	30	10	6	14	44	50	−6	36	
13	GOŠK Dubrovnik	30	10	4	16	27	53	−26	34	
14	Kamen Ivanbegovina	30	9	3	18	32	66	−34	30	
15	Zmaj Makarska	30	5	6	19	27	58	−31	21	
16	Split (R)	30	7	6	17	36	70	−34	17 (Note: 10 points deducted due to decision by the Federation.)	Relegation

Updated to match(es) played on 3 June 2024. Source:
Rules for classification: 1) Points, 2) Head-to-head points, 3) Head-to-head goal difference, 4) Goal difference, 5) Matches won, 6) Goals scored
(C) Champions; (R) Relegated

== Promotion play-offs ==
Team 1	Agg.	Team 2	1st leg	2nd leg
Segesta	3–3 (4–2 p)	Zadar	2–1	1–2 (a.e.t.)
Slavonija Požega	1–3	Uljanik Pula	0–0	1–3

No club that finished in the top 3 in North division obtained license for 2. NL. Because of this, 14th placed team in the 2.NL did not have to play relegation play-off. 4 other group winners played for the remaining 2 spots in 2024-25 Second Football League.
