= 2002–03 Croatian Second Football League =

Druga HNL
- Season: 2002–03
- Champions: Marsonia (North Division); Inker Zaprešić (South Division)
- Promoted: Marsonia; Inker Zaprešić
- Relegated: Podravac; Istra Pula; TŠK Topolovac

The 2002–03 Druga HNL (also known as 2. HNL) season was the 12th season of Croatia's second level football since its establishment in 1992. The league was contested in two regional groups (North Division and South Division), with 12 clubs each.

== North Division ==
=== First stage ===
Pos	Team	Pld	W	D	L	GF	GA	GD	Pts	Qualification
1	Marsonia	22	13	7	2	52	18	+34	46	Qualification to play-off group
2	Belišće	22	13	5	4	45	20	+25	44	Qualification to play-off group
3	Čakovec	22	11	3	8	35	28	+7	36	Qualification to play-off group
4	Koprivnica	22	11	3	8	40	34	+6	36	Qualification to play-off group
5	Omladinac Novo Selo Rok	22	9	4	9	33	38	−5	31	Qualification to play-off group
6	Sloga Nova Gradiška	22	8	6	8	29	34	−5	30	Qualification to play-off group
7	Valpovka	22	8	5	9	44	35	+9	29	Qualification to play-out group
8	Metalac Osijek	22	8	3	11	29	41	−12	27	Qualification to play-out group
9	Vukovar '91	22	6	7	9	25	33	−8	25	Qualification to play-out group
10	Podravac	22	6	7	9	26	38	−12	25	Qualification to play-out group
11	Grafičar Vodovod	22	5	6	11	25	36	−11	21	Qualification to play-out group
12	Dilj	22	2	8	12	20	48	−28	14	Qualification to play-out group

Source: RSSSF.org
Rules for classification: 1) points; 2) goal difference; 3) number of goals scored.

==== Rounds 1–22 results ====
Home \ Away	BEL	ČAK	DILJ	GRV	KOP	MAR	MET	OML	POD	SNG	VAL	VUK
Belišće		2–2	3–0	1–0	3–1	1–1	5–1	4–0	2–1	5–0	1–0	3–1
Čakovec	0–1		3–2	1–0	1–0	3–2	2–1	2–0	3–0	3–0	6–3	3–0
Dilj	3–3	3–0		1–2	1–2	0–3	0–0	1–2	2–2	0–3	2–2	2–1
Grafičar Vodovod	0–3	1–0	1–1		0–1	1–2	0–1	1–1	1–0	1–1	0–3	1–2
Koprivnica	1–0	1–1	7–0	2–5		1–0	3–0	3–0	1–0	2–1	4–2	0–0
Marsonia	0–0	4–2	5–0	5–0	6–2		2–1	4–0	3–0	1–0	2–0	2–2
Metalac Osijek	1–3	1–0	2–1	1–1	3–1	1–3		3–1	2–1	2–0	3–1	1–1
Omladinac NSR	2–1	1–1	2–0	1–4	3–1	2–2	2–1		7–0	1–2	2–0	1–0
Podravac	1–1	0–1	1–1	3–1	3–3	0–0	2–1	4–0		1–0	1–0	4–3
Sloga Nova Gradiška	2–0	1–0	0–0	2–2	3–1	2–2	4–2	2–1	1–1		3–1	0–1
Valpovka	3–0	3–1	0–0	3–3	1–0	0–3	5–0	2–2	4–0	6–1		4–0
Vukovar '91	0–3	2–0	4–0	1–0	1–3	0–0	3–1	0–2	1–1	1–1	1–1	

Source: RSSSF.org
Legend: Blue = home team win; Yellow = draw; Red = away team win.

=== Play-off Group ===
Pos	Team	Pld	W	D	L	GF	GA	GD	Pts	Qualification
1	Marsonia (C, P)	32	19	9	4	65	28	+37	66	Qualification to promotion play-off
2	Belišće	32	19	8	5	62	24	+38	65	
3	Čakovec	32	13	7	12	44	39	+5	46	
4	Omladinac Novo Selo Rok	32	13	6	13	48	52	−4	45	
5	Sloga Nova Gradiška	32	12	7	13	41	43	−2	43	
6	Koprivnica	32	12	5	15	44	56	−12	41	

Source: RSSSF.org
Rules for classification: 1) points; 2) goal difference; 3) number of goals scored.
(C) Champions; (P) Promoted

==== Rounds 23–32 results ====
Home \ Away	BEL	ČAK	KOP	MAR	OML	SNG
Belišće		0–0	4–0	1–1	2–1	1–0
Čakovec	1–2		0–0	2–1	1–1	3–2
Koprivnica	0–5	0–0		0–1	1–3	0–1
Marsonia	1–0	2–1	2–0		3–1	2–1
Omladinac NSR	0–0	2–1	2–3	4–0		1–0
Sloga Nova Gradiška	0–2	1–0	4–0	0–0	3–0	

Source: RSSSF.org
Legend: Blue = home team win; Yellow = draw; Red = away team win.

=== Play-out Group ===
Pos	Team	Pld	W	D	L	GF	GA	GD	Pts	Relegation
7	Metalac Osijek	32	13	4	15	42	56	−14	43	
8	Valpovka	32	12	5	15	55	54	+1	41	
9	Vukovar '91	32	11	8	13	47	49	−2	41	
10	Dilj	32	9	9	14	47	59	−12	36	
11	Grafičar Vodovod	32	9	7	16	40	54	−14	34	
12	Podravac (R)	32	9	7	16	37	58	−21	34	Relegation to Croatian Third Football League

Source: RSSSF.org
Rules for classification: 1) points; 2) goal difference; 3) number of goals scored.
(R) Relegated

==== Rounds 23–32 results ====
Home \ Away	DILJ	GRV	MET	POD	VAL	VUK
Dilj		6–0	4–0	4–2	3–0	2–0
Grafičar Vodovod	0–0		2–0	2–0	4–1	4–1
Metalac Osijek	3–2	1–0		2–1	2–1	3–1
Podravac	1–2	3–2	1–0		3–0	0–2
Valpovka	3–0	2–0	2–1	1–0		0–2
Vukovar '91	2–4	4–1	1–1	5–0	4–1	

Source: RSSSF.org
Legend: Blue = home team win; Yellow = draw; Red = away team win.

== South Division ==
=== First stage ===
Pos	Team	Pld	W	D	L	GF	GA	GD	Pts	Qualification
1	Uljanik	22	15	4	3	45	20	+25	49	Qualification to play-off group
2	Inker Zaprešić	22	15	1	6	53	22	+31	46	Qualification to play-off group
3	Solin Građa	22	9	6	7	30	26	+4	33	Qualification to play-off group
4	Uskok Klis	22	9	5	8	27	27	0	32	Qualification to play-off group
5	Croatia Sesvete	22	8	7	7	28	32	−4	31	Qualification to play-off group
6	Hrvatski Dragovoljac	22	9	2	11	33	35	−2	29	Qualification to play-off group
7	GOŠK Dubrovnik	22	8	5	9	26	29	−3	29	Qualification to play-out group
8	Imotski	22	6	9	7	22	25	−3	27	Qualification to play-out group
9	Novalja	22	6	9	7	22	26	−4	27	Qualification to play-out group
10	Istra Pula	22	8	3	11	29	34	−5	27	Qualification to play-out group
11	Orijent	22	6	4	12	23	36	−13	22	Qualification to play-out group
12	TŠK Topolovac	22	4	3	15	16	42	−26	15	Qualification to play-out group

Source: RSSSF.org
Rules for classification: 1) points; 2) goal difference; 3) number of goals scored.

==== Rounds 1–22 results ====
Home \ Away	SES	GOŠK	HRD	IMO	INK	IST	NOV	ORI	SOL	TŠK	ULJ	USK
Croatia Sesvete		0–1	2–1	1–1	0–4	3–2	2–2	1–0	4–1	3–0	1–1	2–2
GOŠK Dubrovnik	2–3		2–1	2–1	0–1	3–0	1–1	3–2	0–1	2–1	2–4	0–1
Hrvatski Dragovoljac	2–3	4–1		0–3	1–2	1–3	2–0	2–1	4–1	1–0	2–0	1–2
Imotski	1–0	0–0	0–1		2–1	2–2	1–1	3–1	1–1	0–0	0–1	1–1
Inker Zaprešić	3–0	1–0	3–4	4–0		4–2	5–0	3–0	3–0	3–2	3–3	0–1
Istra Pula	2–0	2–0	2–2	1–0	0–1		0–3	3–0	0–2	1–2	1–2	3–1
Novalja	1–1	0–0	1–0	1–1	1–0	0–1		1–1	1–0	3–0	0–3	2–0
Orijent	0–1	1–1	4–1	2–1	0–3	1–0	1–1		0–2	2–1	2–2	3–1
Solin Građa	0–0	4–1	1–1	0–1	0–1	2–2	2–1	2–0		4–0	2–1	1–1
TŠK Topolovac	2–0	0–3	1–2	0–0	0–5	2–1	2–0	1–2	0–0		2–3	0–1
Uljanik	3–0	1–1	2–0	4–1	2–0	3–0	2–1	2–0	1–2	2–0		2–0
Uskok Klis	1–1	0–1	1–0	1–2	4–3	0–1	1–1	1–0	3–2	4–0	0–1	

Source: RSSSF.org
Legend: Blue = home team win; Yellow = draw; Red = away team win.

=== Play-off Group ===
Pos	Team	Pld	W	D	L	GF	GA	GD	Pts	Qualification
1	Inker Zaprešić (C, P)	32	23	3	6	79	30	+49	72	Qualification to promotion play-off
2	Uljanik	32	20	7	5	63	31	+32	67	
3	Uskok Klis	32	13	7	12	48	45	+3	46	
4	Croatia Sesvete	32	12	8	12	43	52	−9	44	
5	Solin Građa	32	11	8	13	45	47	−2	41	
6	Hrvatski Dragovoljac	32	10	4	18	44	63	−19	34	

Source: RSSSF.org
Rules for classification: 1) points; 2) goal difference; 3) number of goals scored.
(C) Champions; (P) Promoted

==== Rounds 23–32 results ====
Home \ Away	SES	HRD	INK	SOL	ULJ	USK
Croatia Sesvete		3–2	2–2	1–0	2–1	2–3
Hrvatski Dragovoljac	1–2		0–6	2–2	1–1	3–2
Inker Zaprešić	2–0	2–1		3–1	2–0	4–2
Solin Građa	4–1	3–0	1–3		0–4	2–2
Uljanik	3–2	3–1	0–0	2–1		2–0
Uskok Klis	2–0	4–0	1–2	3–1	2–2	

Source: RSSSF.org
Legend: Blue = home team win; Yellow = draw; Red = away team win.

=== Play-out Group ===
Pos	Team	Pld	W	D	L	GF	GA	GD	Pts	Qualification or relegation
7	GOŠK Dubrovnik	32	12	6	14	36	40	−4	42	
8	Orijent	32	12	6	14	36	47	−11	42	
9	Novalja	32	10	11	11	33	35	−2	41	
10	Imotski	32	10	10	12	30	35	−5	40	
11	Istra Pula (R)	32	10	5	17	35	48	−13	35	Qualification to relegation play-off
12	TŠK Topolovac (R)	32	9	5	18	32	51	−19	32	Relegation to Croatian Third Football League

Source: RSSSF.org
Rules for classification: 1) points; 2) goal difference; 3) number of goals scored.
(R) Relegated

==== Rounds 23–32 results ====
Home \ Away	GOŠK	IMO	IST	NOV	ORI	TŠK
GOŠK Dubrovnik		2–0	3–1	2–1	0–1	1–1
Imotski	2–0		1–0	1–0	0–1	2–1
Istra Pula	1–0	0–0		1–0	0–3	1–1
Novalja	2–0	2–0	2–1		1–1	2–1
Orijent	1–2	2–1	3–1	0–0		1–0
TŠK Topolovac	1–0	2–1	1–0	2–1	6–0	

Source: RSSSF.org
Legend: Blue = home team win; Yellow = draw; Red = away team win.

== Promotion play-off ==
Marsonia and Inker Zaprešić, winners of the North and South Division, qualified for a two-legged promotion play-off, which took place on 28 May and 1 June 2003. The tie ended in a 4–4 aggregate score and Marsonia won it on away goals, thereby earning promotion to the Prva HNL for the following season.

28 May 2003

Inker Zaprešić	4–3	Marsonia
Brlek 3', 5'; Lalić 35' (pen.); Vidak 90'	Report (in Croatian)	Martinović 28'; Vuka 47' (pen.); Marić 78'

Stadion ŠRC Zaprešić, Zaprešić
Attendance: 4,000
Referee: Edo Trivković (Split)

1 June 2003

Marsonia	1–0	Inker Zaprešić
Šimić 4'	Report (in Croatian)

Gradski stadion uz Savu, Slavonski Brod
Attendance: 6,000
Referee: Miroslav Vitković (Vinkovci)

However, Inker had another chance for promotion, as the losing team from the promotion play-off played another two-legged tie against the 11th placed team of Prva HNL, Pomorac. Inker won 3–1 on aggregate and was promoted to 2003–04 Prva HNL.

== See also ==
- 2002–03 Prva HNL
- 2002–03 Croatian Cup
