= 2000–01 in Croatian football =

First Division champions
- Hajduk Split (4th title)

Second Division champions
- Kamen Ingrad

Third Division champions
- Metalac Osijek, Uljanik Pula, Trnje, Podravac, GOŠK Dubrovnik

Croatian Cup winners
- Dinamo Zagreb (5th title)

Teams in Europe
- Cibalia, Dinamo Zagreb, Rijeka, Osijek, Slaven Belupo

Croatia national team
- 2002 World Cup qualification

The following article presents a summary of the 2000–01 football (soccer) season in Croatia, which was the 10th season of competitive football in the country.

== League tables ==
=== Prva HNL ===
==== Championship group ====
Pos	Team	Pld	W	D	L	GF	GA	GD	Pts	Qualification
1	Hajduk Split (C)	32	20	6	6	66	23	+43	66	Qualification to Champions League second qualifying round
2	Dinamo Zagreb	32	19	8	5	70	36	+34	65	Qualification to UEFA Cup qualifying round
3	Osijek	32	17	6	9	61	47	+14	57	Qualification to UEFA Cup qualifying round
4	Varteks	32	12	9	11	56	56	0	45	Qualification to UEFA Cup qualifying round
5	Slaven Belupo	32	11	11	10	39	37	+2	44	Qualification to Intertoto Cup first round
6	NK Zagreb	32	11	5	16	51	58	−7	38	Qualification to Intertoto Cup first round

Source: RSSSF.org
Rules for classification: 1) points; 2) goal difference; 3) number of goals scored.
(C) Champions

==== Relegation group ====
Pos	Team	Pld	W	D	L	GF	GA	GD	Pts	Qualification
7	Šibenik	32	12	7	13	40	40	0	43	
8	Čakovec	32	10	9	13	28	37	−9	39	
9	Cibalia	32	5	18	9	31	45	−14	33	
10	Rijeka	32	9	6	17	30	44	−14	33	
11	Hrvatski Dragovoljac	32	8	9	15	35	57	−22	33	
12	Marsonia (O)	32	7	8	17	41	68	−27	29	Qualification to relegation play-off

Source: RSSSF.org
Rules for classification: 1) points; 2) goal difference; 3) number of goals scored.
(O) Play-off winners

=== Druga HNL ===
Pos	Team	Pld	W	D	L	GF	GA	GD	Pts	Promotion or relegation
1	Kamen Ingrad (C, P)	34	23	5	6	78	32	+46	74	Promotion to Croatian First Football League (Note: Due to the expansion of Prva HNL to 16 clubs in the 2001–02 season, top four clubs from the 2000–01 Druga HNL were to be automatically promoted. However, third-placed Croatia Sesvete and sixth-placed Belišće had decided to step back from promotion. Therefore, 7th placed team of Druga HNL, Solin played a two-legged relegation play-off against the 12th placed team of Prva HNL, Marsonia.)
2	Pomorac (P)	34	21	7	6	80	30	+50	70	Promotion to Croatian First Football League
3	Croatia Sesvete	34	20	5	9	61	33	+28	65	Promotion to Croatian First Football League
4	Zadar (P)	34	18	7	9	40	30	+10	61	Promotion to Croatian First Football League
5	TŠK Topolovac (P)	34	18	5	11	73	54	+19	59	
6	Belišće	34	16	7	11	48	35	+13	55	
7	Solin Građa	34	14	9	11	44	46	−2	51	Qualification to promotion play-off
8	Mosor	34	15	5	14	43	41	+2	50	
9	PIK Vrbovec	34	14	6	14	51	56	−5	48	
10	Orijent	34	13	8	13	40	40	0	47	
11	Segesta	34	13	7	14	38	47	−9	46	
12	Vukovar '91	34	13	5	16	56	59	−3	44	
13	Bjelovar	34	12	8	14	43	52	−9	44	
14	Istra Pula	34	10	11	13	44	44	0	41	
15	Koprivnica	34	9	6	19	41	65	−24	33	
16	Žminj	34	8	6	20	35	67	−32	30	
17	Imotska Krajina	34	5	10	19	28	57	−29	25	
18	Jadran Poreč (R)	34	2	7	25	22	77	−55	13	Qualification to relegation play-off

Source: RSSSF.org
Rules for classification: 1) points; 2) goal difference; 3) number of goals scored.
(C) Champions; (P) Promoted; (R) Relegated
