= Stanko Mršić =

Croatian footballer and manager

Personal information
- Full name: Stanko Mršić
- Date of birth: 12 September 1955 (age 71)
- Place of birth: Imotski, FPR Yugoslavia
- Position: Defender

Senior career*
Years	Team	Apps	(Gls)
1974–1977	Mračaj Runović		
1977–1980	RNK Split		
1980–1981	Hajduk Split	0	(0)
1981–1982	Solin	24	(0)
1982–1985	Dinamo Vinkovci	45	(0)
1985–1988	Rudar Ljubija	26	(0)
1988–1990	Dinamo Vinkovci	35	(1)

Managerial career
- 1993–1995: Cibalia
- 1995–1996: Zadarkomerc
- 1996–1997: Čakovec
- 1997–1998: Varteks
- 1998–1999: Imotska Krajina
- 1999: Posušje
- 1999: Šibenik
- 1999–2001: Osijek
- 2001–2002: Zadar
- 2002–2003: Šibenik
- 2003–2005: Zadar
- 2005–2007: Međimurje
- 2007: Istra 1961
- 2007: Imotski
- 2008: Primorac Biograd
- 2008–2011: Cibalia
- 2012–2013: Osijek
- 2013–2014: RNK Split
- 2014: Cibalia
- 2015–2016: Vinogradar
- 2016: Cibalia
- 2019: GOŠK Gabela
- 2021–2022: Škabrnja
- 2022–: Arbanasi
- * Club domestic league appearances and goals

Stanko Mršić (born 12 September 1955) is a Croatian professional football manager and former player.

== Managerial career ==
Mršić began his managerial career at Cibalia in 1993 and since then he also has managed other 1. HNL clubs, among them Zadar, Varteks, Šibenik, Osijek and Međimurje. He holds the record for most managed matches in 1. HNL history with over 300 games. He managed in 482 Croatian football league matches in total over the different divisions.

On 12 March 2019, he was named the new manager of back then still Bosnian Premier League club GOŠK Gabela. After GOŠK got relegated to the First League of FBiH, Mršić decided to leave the club.

== Honours ==
=== Manager ===
Varteks

- Croatian Cup runner-up: 1997–98

Posušje

- First League of Herzeg-Bosnia: 1998–99
