= Danijel Pranjić =

Croatian football manager and former player (born 1981)

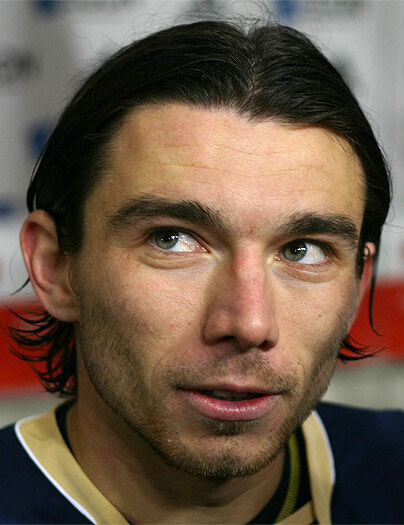
- Pranjić in 2009

Personal information
- Full name: Danijel Pranjić
- Date of birth: 2 December 1981 (age 44)
- Place of birth: Našice, SR Croatia, Yugoslavia
- Height: 1.71 m (5 ft 7 in)
- Positions: Left winger; full-back

Youth career
- 1998–2000: NAŠK

Senior career*
Years	Team	Apps	(Gls)
1998–2000	NAŠK		
2000–2001	Papuk		
2001–2002	Belišće	28	(7)
2002–2004	Osijek	53	(3)
2004–2005	Dinamo Zagreb	29	(2)
2005–2009	Heerenveen	129	(32)
2009–2012	Bayern Munich	55	(1)
2011	Bayern Munich II	1	(0)
2012–2013	Sporting CP	9	(0)
2013	→ Celta de Vigo (loan)	10	(0)
2013–2016	Panathinaikos	80	(9)
2016–2017	Koper	20	(1)
2017–2019	Anorthosis Famagusta	61	(6)
2019–2020	Ayia Napa	17	(1)
2020–2021	Omonia Psevda	13	(1)

International career
2002–2004	Croatia U21	15	(1)
2004–2015	Croatia	58	(1)

Managerial career
- 2020–2021: Omonia Psevda (player-manager)
- 2021: Dubrava
- 2022–2023: Trnje
- 2023: Sloboda Tuzla
- 2023–2024: Achyronas-Onisilos
- 2024: GOŠK Gabela
- * Club domestic league appearances and goals

Danijel Pranjić (born 2 December 1981) is a Croatian professional football manager and former player who played as a full-back. Being a versatile left-footed player, he could play all across the left wing and could also be used as a central midfielder.

Pranjić had the most success with Bundesliga side Bayern Munich, winning the double in the 2009–10 season and reaching the 2010 and 2012 Champions League final. Pranjić has also played for clubs in the Netherlands, Portugal, Spain, Greece, Slovenia and Cyprus. At the international level, he debuted for Croatia in 2004 and participated in three major tournaments with his national side, Euro 2008, Euro 2012 and the 2014 World Cup.

After retiring as a player, Pranjić managed Croatian lower league clubs Dubrava and Trnje. He managed Bosnian sides Sloboda Tuzla and GOŠK Gabela, as well as Cypriot club Achyronas-Onisilos.

== Club career ==
Born in Našice, Pranjić started his career at hometown club NAŠK. He also played for Papuk and Belišće before being acquired by Croatian top side Osijek in 2002. Pranjić transferred to Dinamo Zagreb two seasons later in 2004. While at Dinamo Zagreb, he also played regularly during their 2004–05 UEFA Cup campaign, making six appearances and scoring one goal in the competition.

In 2005, Pranjić was transferred to Dutch Eredivisie side Heerenveen. His good performances as an offensive winger secured him a return to international football with Croatia in 2007. He started the 2008–09 Eredivisie season well, netting four goals in his first three league matches. Pranjić scored his first hat-trick in the KNVB Cup on 12 November 2008 in a huge 7–0 win against Haaglandia. On 31 January 2009, he scored the only goal in a Heerenveen victory against Ajax. A month later, Pranjić scored a late penalty that gave Heerenveen a 3–2 win over PSV. He won the KNVB Cup with Heerenveen at the end of the 2008–09 season, which turned out to be his last match for the club.

In June 2009, Bayern Munich announced Pranjić would join the club. He struggled to make an impact in his first season with the club, starting only 14 matches and losing out to first choice left-back Holger Badstuber. Due to his utility and injuries to other teammates, however, he started an increasing number of games in his second season with the Bavarian club.

On 13 July 2012, after the expiration of his Bayern contract, Pranjić was announced as a new signing for Portuguese Primeira Liga team Sporting CP. He played nine games for Os Leões before joining Spanish La Liga club Celta de Vigo in January 2013 on loan until the end of the season. On 30 August 2013, Pranjić and Sporting terminated the contract in mutual agreement.

On 2 September 2013, it was officially announced that Pranjić had signed with Panathinaikos for three years. He made his professional debut in a 1–1 away draw against Platanias.

On 11 September 2016, Pranjić joined Slovenian club Koper on a free transfer. On 21 July 2017, he signed with Cypriot club Anorthosis. On 1 July 2019, Pranjić signed with Ayia Napa, competing in the Cypriot Second Division.

== International career ==
Pranjić started his international career with the Croatian under-21 national team, earning a total of 15 caps and scoring one goal for the team between 2002 and 2004.

On 16 November 2004, Pranjić made his full international debut for Croatia in a friendly match against the Republic of Ireland. After two years of absence from the national team, he was called up for a friendly match against Norway in February 2007. Later that year, he also appeared in three UEFA Euro 2008 qualifiers.

Asked to play a defensive role by Croatia coach Slaven Bilić, although still predominantly a midfielder in his club career, Pranjić was the only Croatian to start all four games at the UEFA Euro 2008 finals. Pranjić provided an assist to Darijo Srna to score the opener in Croatia's 2–1 victory over Germany and an assist to Ivan Klasnić to score the only goal in their next game, a 1–0 win over Poland.

He kept his place as a regular in the national team during their unsuccessful qualifying campaign for the 2010 FIFA World Cup, appearing in a total of nine matches. On 28 September 2012, Pranjić retired from the national team in protest to the call up of Brazilian-born player Sammir.

On 10 November 2013, Niko Kovač called up Pranjić to the national team after Ivan Strinić sustained an injury that made him ineligible for the 2014 FIFA World Cup qualifying play-offs against Iceland. He was called up to Croatia's 23-man squad for the 2014 FIFA World Cup.

Pranjić's last match for Croatia was a Euro 2016 qualification match against Azerbaijan in September 2015. He earned a total of 58 caps, scoring 1 goal.

== Career statistics ==
=== Club ===
Club performance			League		Cup		Continental		Total	
Season	Club	League	Apps	Goals	Apps	Goals	Apps	Goals	Apps	Goals
Croatia			League		Croatian Cup		Europe		Total	
2002–03	Osijek	Prva HNL	30	1					30	1
2003–04	Osijek	Prva HNL	23	2					23	2
2004–05	Dinamo Zagreb	Prva HNL	29	2			6	1	35	3
Netherlands			League		KNVB Cup		Europe		Total	
2005–06	Heerenveen	Eredivisie	32	5	2	0	8	0	42	5
2006–07	Heerenveen	Eredivisie	34	2	1	0	6	1	41	3
2007–08	Heerenveen	Eredivisie	33	9	2	0	2	0	37	9
2008–09	Heerenveen	Eredivisie	30	16	2	3	4	1	36	20
Germany			League		DFB-Pokal		Europe		Total	
2009–10	Bayern Munich	Bundesliga	20	1	2	0	7	0	29	1
2010–11	Bayern Munich	Bundesliga	28	0	4	0	7	0	39	0
2011–12	Bayern Munich	Bundesliga	7	0	1	0	5	0	13	0
Portugal			League		Taça de Portugal		Europe		Total	
2012–13	Sporting CP	Primeira Liga	9	0	2	0	6	1	17	1
Spain			League		Copa del Rey		Europe		Total	
2012–13	Celta de Vigo	La Liga	10	0	0	0	0	0	10	0
Greece			League		Greek Cup		Europe		Total	
2013–14	Panathinaikos	Super League Greece	28	5	7	0	0	0	35	5
2014–15	Panathinaikos	Super League Greece	29	4	1	0	10	0	40	4
2015–16	Panathinaikos	Super League Greece	23	0	6	0	4	0	33	0
Slovenia			League		Slovenian Cup		Europe		Total	
2016–17	Koper	PrvaLiga	20	1					20	1
Cyprus			League		Cypriot Cup		Europe		Total	
2017–18	Anorthosis Famagusta	First Division	32	1	0	0	0	0	32	1
2018–19	Anorthosis Famagusta	First Division	29	5	0	0	2	1	31	6
2019–20	Ayia Napa	Second Division	0	0	0	0	0	0	0	0
Total	Croatia		82	5			6	1	88	6
Total	Netherlands		129	32	7	3	20	2	156	37
Total	Germany		55	1	7	0	19	0	81	1
Total	Portugal		9	0	2	0	6	1	17	1
Total	Spain		10	0	0	0	0	0	10	0
Total	Greece		80	9	14	0	14	0	108	9
Total	Slovenia		20	1					20	1
Total	Cyprus		61	6	0	0	2	1	63	7
Career total			446	54	30	3	67	5	543	62

=== International goals ===
Scores and Results show Croatia's goal tally first

No.	Date	Venue	Opponent	Score	Result	Competition	Ref.
1	28 March 2015	Stadion Maksimir, Zagreb, Croatia	Norway	5–1	5–1	UEFA Euro 2016 qualifying	

=== Managerial ===
As of match played 26 October 2024

Managerial record by team and tenure
Team	From	To	Record							
Team	From	To	G	W	D	L	GF	GA	GD	Win %
Omonia Psevda (player-manager)	8 September 2020	15 April 2021	30	9	6	15	37	50	−13	30.00
Dubrava	1 July 2021	10 August 2021	0	0	0	0	0	0	+0	—
Trnje	20 January 2022	21 March 2023	39	16	11	12	66	60	+6	41.03
Sloboda Tuzla	22 March 2023	12 June 2023	10	2	2	6	10	17	−7	20.00
Achyronas-Onisilos	1 July 2023	15 January 2024	16	4	7	5	18	17	+1	25.00
GOŠK Gabela	14 August 2024	27 October 2024	9	1	1	7	7	21	−14	11.11
Total			104	32	27	45	138	165	−27	30.77

== Honours ==
=== Player ===
Heerenveen

- KNVB Cup: 2008–09

Bayern Munich

- Bundesliga: 2009–10
- DFB-Pokal: 2009–10
- DFL-Supercup: 2010
- UEFA Champions League runner-up: 2009–10, 2011–12

Panathinaikos

- Greek Cup: 2013–14
