= Andrea Ottochian =

Croatian footballer

Personal information
- Date of birth: 28 June 1988 (age 38)
- Place of birth: Rovinj, SR Croatia, SFR Yugoslavia
- Height: 1.79 m (5 ft 10 in)
- Position: Winger

Youth career
- 1998–2004: Rovinj
- 2004–2005: Istra 1961
- 2005–2007: Rovinj

Senior career*
| Years | Team | Apps | (Gls) |
| 2007–2009 | Rovinj | | (19) |
| 2010–2012 | Karlovac | 35 | (0) |
| 2012–2013 | Istra 1961 | 30 | (1) |
| 2013–2015 | Cibalia | 54 | (10) |
| 2015–2017 | Inter Zaprešić | 57 | (3) |
| 2018 | Istra 1961 | 14 | (2) |
| 2018 | Vinogradar | 8 | (1) |
| 2019 | Liezen | 8 | (1) |
| 2019–2020 | Rovinj | | |
| 2020- | Smoljanci | | |
- * Club domestic league appearances and goals as of 14 September 2018

Andrea Ottochian (born 28 June 1988) is a Croatian footballer who last played for NK Smoljanci Sloboda Svetvinčenat.

== Club career ==
Ottochian started his career with Rovinj in Croatia's 3. HNL. Since 2010, Ottochian played for several 1. HNL clubs, including Karlovac, Istra 1961 and Inter Zaprešić. He also spent two seasons with Cibalia in 2. HNL. In January 2018, Ottochian returned to Istra 1961. He had a short spell with Austrian side Liezen in 2019.
