= Duje Mrdeša =

Croatian footballer

Personal information
- Date of birth: 14 June 1997 (age 29)
- Place of birth: Vinkovci, Croatia
- Height: 1.77 m (5 ft 9 1/2 in)
- Position: Midfielder

Team information
- Current team: Bedem Ivankovo
- Number: 8

Youth career
- 2005–2013: Cibalia
- 2013–2016: Rijeka

Senior career*
Years	Team	Apps	(Gls)
2015–2016	Rijeka II	21	(0)
2016–2018	Bedem Ivankovo	41	(10)
2018	Cibalia	15	(0)
2018	Lokomotiv Plovdiv	0	(0)
2019–	Bedem Ivankovo		
2021	→ Borac Agrar (loan)		

International career
2018 6	Croatia U21	1	(0)
- * Club domestic league appearances and goals as of 27 May 2019

Duje Mrdeša (born 14 June 1997) is a Croatian footballer who currently plays as a midfielder for Croatian third tier-side NK Bedem Ivankovo.

== Career ==
At the end of January 2019, Mrdeša re-joined Bedem Ivankovo.
