= Antun Dunković =

Croatian footballer

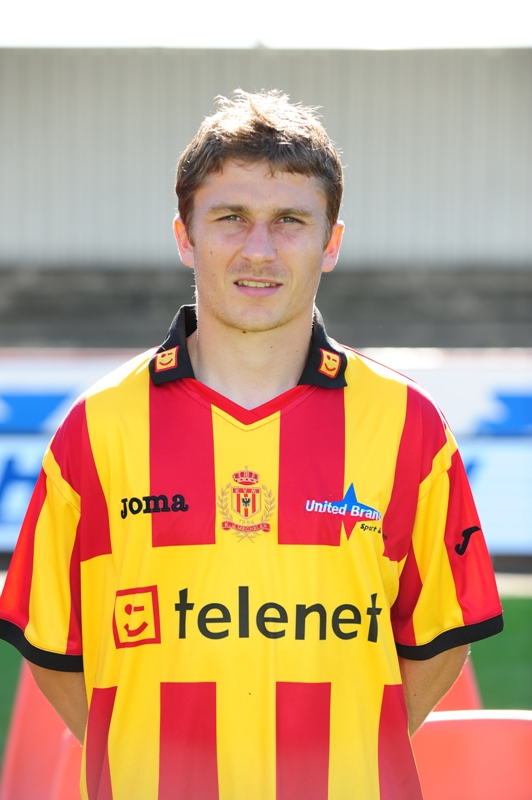

Personal information
- Date of birth: 7 June 1981 (age 45)
- Place of birth: Virovitica, Croatia
- Height: 1.66 m (5 ft 5 in)
- Position: Attacking midfielder

Senior career*
Years	Team	Apps	(Gls)
1998–1999	Mladost 127	8	(0)
2000–2004	Pomorac	108	(14)
2004–2005	Rijeka	25	(2)
2005–2006	Slaven Belupo	29	(0)
2006–2007	Croatia Sesvete	12	(2)
2007–2011	Mechelen	81	(7)
2011–2012	Royal Antwerp	13	(1)
2012	Crikvenica	17	(6)
2012–2013	Pomorac	27	(2)
2013–2014	Opatija	13	(3)
2014	Partizani Tirana	7	(0)
2014–2015	Opatija	35	(15)
2021-	Četekovac	28	(8)
- * Club domestic league appearances and goals as of 28 October 2015

Antun Dunković (born 7 June 1981) is a Croatian retired footballer who played as a defensive midfielder. He last played for NK Opatija in the Croatian Third Football League.

He previously played for NK Pomorac, NK Rijeka, NK Slaven Belupo, NK Croatia Sesvete and Belgian sides K.V. Mechelen and Royal Antwerp F.C..

== Honours ==
NK Pomorac

- Druga HNL: 2000–01

HNK Rijeka

- Croatian Cup: 2005

NK Opatija

- Treća HNL – West: 2013–14
- Inter-county League Rijeka promotion: 2014–15
