= Luka Grubišić =

Croatian footballer

Personal information
- Full name: Luka Grubišić
- Date of birth: 9 November 1997 (age 29)
- Place of birth: Split, Croatia
- Height: 1.70 m (5 ft 7 in)
- Position: Attacking midfielder

Team information
- Current team: Uskok

Youth career
- 2004–2007: Dalmatinac Split
- 2007–2009: Hajduk Split
- 2009–2017: RNK Split

Senior career*
Years	Team	Apps	(Gls)
2014–2017	RNK Split	29	(0)
2017	Široki Brijeg	2	(0)
2018–2019	Primorac 1929	28	(1)
2019	Dugopolje	13	(0)
2019–2021	Hajduk Split II	30	(2)
2021-	Uskok		

International career
2013	Croatia U17	4	(0)
2015	Croatia U18	2	(0)
2015	Croatia U19	9	(0)
- * Club domestic league appearances and goals as of 15:46, 27 December 2019 (UTC)

Luka Grubišić (born 9 November 1997) is a Croatian footballer playing for Uskok.

== Club career ==
Coming from the Brda quarter of Split, Grubišić first joined the NK Dalmatinac Split academy at the age of 7, before moving on to HNK Hajduk Split 3 years later. In 2009, he moved on to the RNK Split academy, where he spent the rest of his youth career. A youth international, he debuted for the senior team in September 2014, at the age of 16.

In June 2017, after he featured in 29 league matches over the previous three seasons, Grubišić left the relegated RNK Split and joined NK Široki Brijeg.

Not getting enough playing time, he left Široki and moved to the Croatian third-tier NK Primorac 1929 club in February 2018. In February 2019, he then joined NK Dugopolje. In summer 2021, he left Hajduk Split II for Uskok.
