= BŠK Zmaj =

Croatian football club

BŠK Zmaj Blato
- Full name: Blatski Športski Klub Zmaj
- Nickname: Crveni (The Reds)
- Founded: 1926; 100 years ago
- Ground: Zlinje
- Capacity: 1,500
- Chairman: Zlatan Milat
- League: 1. ŽNL Dubrovačko-neretvanska
Home colours	Away colours

BŠK Zmaj Blato is a Croatian professional football club based in the municipality of Blato, situated on the western part of island of Korčula.

== History ==
=== Early history ===
Blatski športski klub Zmaj was founded in 1926. At the founding meeting adopted the name of BŠK Zmaj and other symbols, which were kept in the name and identity of the club to this day. Adopted a red jersey with white pants. It is also certain that the flag of the club is red and white vertically placed. At this time in Blato were several football clubs, like NŠK Val, NŠK Jadran, and NŠK Hajduk.

The NŠK Hajduk was founded by the people from the areas of Mali Učijak and Dočine in 1925 and financed it ourselves. In 1927 was arranged a match against his rival Zmaj. Convinced of their superiority over the dragon agreed the following conditions. If the Zmaj in the match scores more than 5 goals, Hajduk will give the football and disband. The Zmaj gave 9 goals, received the ball, and Hajduk was dissolved in the following year when the entire membership passed in BŠK Zmaj.

From 1923 until 1941 in Blato are operated by two football clubs. In those years were often apart and create new clubs, and one of the reasons were the political conditions that are often changed in these turbulent inter-war years. So the BŠK Zmaj in early 1929 was banned by the government. As Zmaj was very popular in Blato because the period from 1926 to 1928 had not recorded a single defeat of the then rivals, and his name and what he represented could not be stifled by the authorities. Thus, in 1937 by people who were not involved in the clubs back then launched an initiative to establish the Zmaj and he is revived by the arrival of the Italian occupiers in 1941.

Then off again BŠK Zmaj, who at times became one of the organized society in Blato, and other than football, founded by the section athletics, water polo, swimming and later chess.

=== History after Croatian independence ===
The 2009–10 season was the richest in the long history of Zmaj. They won the Četvrta HNL – South group of Dubrovnik-Neretva and won the county cup. Zmaj has qualified for the promotion play-off for Treća HNL – South with the winners of the Split-Dalmatia and Šibenik-Knin/Zadar groups of Četvrta HNL – South. In the mini-league with NK Mladost from Proložac and NK Polača from Polača Zmaj has round before the end secured the first place and got into the Treća HNL.

To ensure the conditions necessary for the performance in the Treća HNL made the huge work on the playground Zlinje. The first major works after more than thirty years.

As the winner of the county cup BŠK Zmaj got a chance to compete in the Croatian Cup qualifying and at beginning of 2010–11 season the draw was held in Zagreb. Zmaj got the worst possible opponent in this part of the competition, Prva HNL club NK Karlovac. Thus on 25 August 2010 in Croatian Cup preliminary round for the first time in the history of Zmaj in an official match hosted a Prva HNL team. BŠK Zmaj has played an excellent game. Outscored their first league who did not show anything, but unfortunately in the stoppage time has received equating goal. The score was 1–1 after extra time has not changed, although the Zmaj and then had a good opportunity. In a penalty shoot-out drama continued and the Dragons win from 5 achieved only one goal. Karlovac were the last series of successful and achieved second goal from the penalty, and happily and smoothly passed on. The overall result was 2–3, 1–1 after 90 minutes.

== Supporters ==
Club is renowned for its loyal supporters known as Red Dragons ("Zmaj" means Dragon in Croatian).
