= NK Arbanasi =

Football club in Croatia

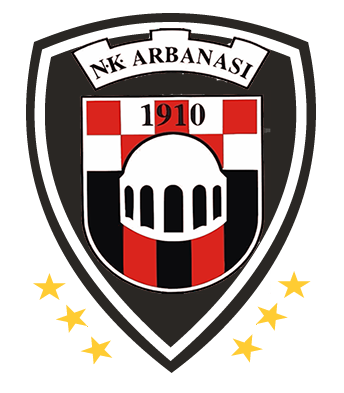
- Full name: NK Arbanasi Zadar
- Founded: 1910
- Stadium: Stanovi Stadium
- Chairman: Edi Perović
- Manager: Mišel Jelenković
- League: 1. ŽNL
- Website: https://www.nkarbanasi.hr/
Home colours	Away colours

NK Arbanasi is a football club from the village of Arbanasia near Zadar. Founded in 1910 as NK Zmaj, it is one of the oldest football clubs in Croatia in continuous existence.

== History ==
The first official football match in Zadar was played in Ravnice in 1887. It was played by the crews of the English fleet, without the participation of our men. The beginning of the football game in the Zadar area is January 25, 1895, when the students of the Zadar grammar school in Bokanjac were the first among the Zadar Croats to present the game. As early as 1899, football was introduced as a subject in the curriculum of the Zadar grammar school.

The Arbanasi district has the honor of being the first among Zadar's Croats to have an organized football club, when Zmaj - Hrvatski sokol was founded in 1910. The club was founded in 1910 under the name NK Zmaj and was the first football club in Zadar. The name Zmaj was given in honor of the Zadar Archbishop Vicko Zmajević. In its beginnings, it operated as a football section of the Croatian Sokol in Zadar. The club went under that name for only a year when it got changed to the Italian one Società Bersaglieri di Borgo Erizzo and under that name it won the second edition of the championship of the Kingdom of Dalmatia. And the club operated under this name until the fall of the Italian administration in Zadar in 1943. As all sport clubs in Yugoslavia got disbanded in 1945 by Belgrade authorities after the end of the Second World War, in 1946 the club underwent a communist rebranding like most others in the country, and played as a department of the Zadar Sport Association. On November 1, 1949, the Arbanasi Gymnastics Society was founded and the NK Arbanasi football section was joined into it. Finally on February 27, 1952, NK Arbanasi became an independent club. The following season, the senior team achieved the greatest success of that age in the history of the club - they won the Dalmatian Cup, defeating the second team of Hajduk Split in the final. The winners are: Vice Mazija, Ivo Herenda, Ivo Ante Matulović, Josip Đošo Petani, Josip Ličan Dadić, Mate Maći Petani, Mario Rio Nikpalj, Anđelo Mazija, Ante Pavelić Morović, Đuro Nikpalj and Josip Beži Mazija. They were led by coach Josip Bepi Morović.

In 1955 it changed its name again, this time to Tvornica Duhana. And in the spirit of then current politics, the club changed its name to a more proletarian sounding NK Omladinac in 1956, and under that name the junior team achieved the greatest success in the history of all club's sections. It became the Dalmatia champion and third in the Croatian championship.

With the political winds of change that hit Croatia and the Zadar count, on September the 1st 1992, the club's board decided to rename the club to its older name - NK Arbanasi, under which the club still operates today. NK Arbansi was the first football club in Zadar to publish a sports monograph Sport kod Zadarskih Arbanasa (2008) by Drago Marić and Bernard Kotlar.

Football has been played in Arbanasi for approximately 120 years. Footballers from the area include Josip Bepi Marušić, who played professionally for the Serie A club Bologna, and Vice Mazija, a scorer in Zadar football.

The first playground where NK Arbanasi played was in the area of the Arbanasi Local Board near Bregdetti Bay. After that, the Club used the playground next to the Bus Station for almost 40 years. Currently, until the construction of its new playground, NK Arbanasi has an auxiliary football field in Stanovi, where artificial grass has been placed.

== Successes ==
By far the biggest success in the club history is the victory in the second edition of the Championship of the Kingdom of Dalmatia, in 1912.

The club achieved its greatest post-war success in 1954 when it won the Dalmatian Cup, and in 1965 and 1975 it was a finalist in the same competition. For several seasons, the club also plays in the Dalmatian football league.

The club in the 2017/18 season. competed in the 1. ŽNL Zadar.
