= NK Kamen Podbablje =

Croatian football club

Kamen Podbablje
- Full name: Nogometni Klub Kamen Podbablje
- Founded: 1977
- Ground: Igralište NK Kamen
- Capacity: 2000
- League: Treća HNL – South
- 2021–22: 15th
colours

NK Kamen Podbablje is a Croatian football club currently playing in the Treća HNL, the Croatian third division. The team is from Ivanbegovina, a town of only 200 inhabitants, and the small size of the town for a third division team has been noted in Croatian newspapers. The club is also known as Kamen Podbablje, after the slightly larger nearby settlement of Podbablje. The Podbablje municipality helps fund the team, around 480,000 kunas (€63,620) a year.

The club was founded in 1977 and has played in the third division since 2012.

The club won the 2011 Zdravko Udović friendly tournament, annually hosted by NK Uskok Klis.

They have a local derby with NK Imotski.
