= NK Opatija =

Croatian football club

- Full name: Nogometni klub Opatija
- Founded: 1911; 115 years ago
- Ground: Stadion NK Opatija ("Campo"); Stadion Kantrida
- Capacity: 802
- Chairman: Robert Perčić
- Manager: Zoran Bogolin
- League: First Football League (Croatia)
- 2025–26: 8th
- Website: http://hr.nk-opatija.com/
Home colours	Away colours

NK Opatija is a Croatian association football club. It is based in Opatija and was founded in 1911, making it one of the oldest football clubs in Croatia. The team competes in the 1. NL, the second tier of the Croatian football league system.

== History ==
The beginnings of organized football in Opatija date back to 1911, when the Opatija branch of the Croatian Sokol movement's football section was founded, under the name of "Football Section of the Croatian Sokol - Opatija-Volosko". The initiative came from a group of students from a trade academy in Vienna, similarly to how Hajduk was founded in Split's by students who had returned from Prague that same year.

Opatija played its first official match on May 14, 1911, in Sušak, competing against the football section of that town's Sokol. In 1912, the German residents of Opatija founded their own team called the German FC Opatija Vorwärts. The rivalry which immediately developed between the two clubs resulted in disagreements within the Croatian Sokol. At the suggestion of Ivan Matetić Ronjgov, a separate sports club was founded, bearing the name Slavenski Športski klub Opatija (Slavic Sport Club "Opatija").

The club changed its name once again in 1919 (to Hajduk) and back to Športski klub Opatija in 1921. At that time, the city was administered by the Kingdom of Italy and its authorities were pushing all local entities to dropping the "Slavic" prefix in their names. In, 1923 the club changed its name once more (to Olymp) but soon, most players moved to Concordia, a club playing in Rijeka. The mostly abandoned club Olymp was then put under more pressure by the Italian authorities and was finally renamed Virtus. In 1936, the Italian regime forced another name change to Abbazia.

In 1946, after World War II, the city fell under the administration of Yugoslavia. The new regime forced the club to become an all-round sports club (as most clubs in the country at the time), a model copied from Soviet Union. The club did not have a playground which made official performances impossible until October 31, 1948 when the first official match of the new club, NK Opatija, was played. For the next 43 years, Opatija mostly played in regional leagues.

In 1992, after Croatia became an independent nation, the club started competing in the Third Tier of the national league system. After 28 years in lower tiers, Opatija finally succeeded in moving up to the Second Tier in 2020. The club was relegated back to Third Tier in 2022, but bounced back to Second Tier in 2024 where it is playing in the current season 2025/26.

== Recent seasons ==
Season	League									Cup	Top goalscorer	
Season	Division	P	W	D	L	F	A	Pts	Pos	Cup	Player	Goals
1992	3. HNL West	14	4	4	6	22	19	12	6th	—		
1992–93	3. HNL West	30	11	10	9	70	46	32	9th	—		
1993–94	3. HNL West	32	9	7	16	41	66	25	12th	—		
1994–95	3. HNL West	N/A										
1996–97	2. HNL West	30	10	10	10	41	40	30*	6th	—		
1997–98	2. HNL West	30	8	10	12	43	39	34	11th ↓	—		
1998–99	3. HNL West	30	11	7	12	34	38	40	8th	—		
1999–2000	3. HNL West	30	9	10	11	33	35	37	10th	—		
2000–01	3. HNL West	30	12	11	7	59	42	47	4th	—		
2001–02	3. HNL West	30	21	5	4	66	25	68	1st	—		
2002–03	3. HNL West	30	17	5	8	46	28	56	3rd	—		
2003–04	3. HNL West	30	9	10	11	30	40	37	11th	—		
2004–05	3. HNL West	30	10	9	11	40	42	39	9th	—		
2005–06	3. HNL West	30	7	10	13	49	53	30	13th ↓	—		
2006–07	4. HNL West	28	10	5	12	40	39	36	7th	—		
2007–08	4. HNL West	26	9	3	14	47	47	30	10th	—		
2008–09	4. HNL West	28	17	3	8	53	26	54	3rd	—		
2009–10	4. HNL West	28	20	4	4	69	16	63	1st ↑	—		
2010–11	3. HNL West	34	13	11	10	53	42	50	7th	R1	Alen Matovina	13
2011–12	3. HNL West	34	15	9	10	39	38	54	4th	R1	Ratko Kremenović	9
2012–13	3. HNL West	30	12	7	11	51	44	43	5th	—	Danijel Lazić, Damir Radomir	7
2013–14	3. HNL West	28	20	4	4	64	30	64	1st ↓	PR	Niko Vlatković	15
2014–15	4. HNL Rijeka	30	17	6	7	55	27	57	2nd ↑	R2	Antun Dunković	13
2015–16	3. HNL West	30	13	4	13	39	45	43	9th	R2	Ivan Brozović, Alen Matovina	8
2016–17	3. HNL West	30	14	7	9	58	51	49	5th	—	Aleksandar Šolić	7
2017–18	3. HNL West	34	21	6	7	55	28	69	2nd	—	Alen Matovina	18
2018–19	3. HNL West	34	13	9	12	55	50	48	8th	—	Baltazar Anton Bogolin	11
2019–20	3. HNL West	16	10	4	2	34	13	34	1st ↑	R2	Baltazar Anton Bogolin; Antonio Pejanović	7
2020–21	2. HNL	34	12	14	8	42	42	50	7th	—	Antonio Pejanović	9
2021–22	2. HNL	30	6	7	17	27	47	25	16th ↓	—	Borna Bilobrk	4
2022–23	2. NL	30	12	9	9	48	42	45	7th	—	Edin Junuzović	9
2023–24	2. NL	30	20	4	6	48	21	64	1st ↑	—	Goodness Ajayi	16
2024–25	1. NL	33	19	11	3	48	20	68	2nd	—	Dominik Mulac	13
2025–26	1. NL	33	10	10	13	31	38	40	8th	PR	Cherno Saho, Robert Mišković	6

Key

League: P = Matches played; W = Matches won; D = Matches drawn; L = Matches lost; F = Goals for; A = Goals against; Pts = Points won; Pos = Final position.
Cup: PR = Preliminary round; R1 = First round; R2 = Round of 16; QF = Quarter-final; SF = Semi-final; RU = Runner-up; W = Competition won.

== Honours ==
- Druga NL (1): 2023–24
- Croatian Third Football League – Division West (2): 2001–02, 2019–20
- Croatian Fourth Football League – Division West (1): 2009–10

== Current squad ==
As of 20 February 2026

Note: Flags indicate national team as defined under FIFA eligibility rules; some limited exceptions apply. Players may hold more than one non-FIFA nationality.

No.	Pos.	Nation	Player
1	GK	NGR	David Nwolokor
2	DF	CRO	Duje Ušalj
3	DF	CRO	Leon Brlek
4	MF	CRO	Matej Mršić
5	MF	CRO	Vedran Dalić
6	MF	CRO	David Arapović
7	MF	NGR	Goodness Ajayi
8	MF	CRO	Ivan Horvat
9	FW	CRO	Val Bogolin
10	MF	BIH	Emanuel Mađarić
11	MF	CRO	Ivor Weitzer
12	DF	CRO	Andro Švrljuga
13	FW	CRO	Antonio Bunueta
14	MF	CRO	Antonio Pejanović
15	DF	CRO	Ricardo Bagadur
16	MF	CRO	Gabriel Groznica

No.	Pos.	Nation	Player
17	MF	CRO	Mateo Furijan
18	MF	KOS	Nikition Delijaj
19	DF	CRO	Nikola Macolić
21	DF	CRO	Luka Marić
22	DF	CRO	Adriano Milanović
23	DF	CRO	Rajan Žlibanović
32	GK	CRO	Dominik Pezelj
44	DF	CRO	Sean Suke
45	FW	CRO	Baltazar Anton Bogolin
55	FW	GAM	Cherno Saho
91	MF	SUI	Nusret Shehu
-	GK	CRO	Niko Vučetić
-	DF	CRO	Luka Matić
-	MF	SUI	Florent Shehu
-	MF	CRO	Robert Mišković
