= NK Dinara =

Croatian football club

Dinara
- Full name: Nogometni klub Dinara
- Founded: 29 July 1913; 112 years ago, as Sportski klub Lav
- Ground: Podno tvrđave
- Capacity: 3,000
- Chairman: Dragan Miličević
- Manager: Alen Gavranić
- League: 1. ŽNL – Šibenik-Knin
Home colours	Away colours

NK Dinara is a Croatian football club based in the town of Knin, which competes in the 1. ŽNL, the fourth tier of the Croatian football league system.

== Notable former players ==
- (Socialist Federal Republic of Yugoslavia) Radomir Vukčević
- (Canada) Milan Borjan (youth)
