= NK Posavina Zagreb =

Croatian football club

- Full name: NK Posavina Zagreb
- Founded: 1955
- Ground: Igralište na Savici
- Capacity: 1,000
Home colours	Away colours

NK Posavina was a Croatian football club based in the city of Zagreb. The former name of the club was NK Chromos. A new club is formed under the name NK Croatia '98
