= NK Novalja =

Croatian football club

- Full name: NK Novalja
- Founded: 1994
- Ground: Cissa Strasko
- Capacity: 2,000
- Chairman: Ante Dabo
- Manager: Ivica Datković
- League: First League of Lika-Senj County
- 2017–18: First League of Lika-Senj County, 5th
Home colours	Away colours

NK Novalja is a Croatian football club based in the town of Novalja in the north of the island of Pag.

== Honours ==
- (Croatia) Druga HNL – South:
  - Winners (1): 2004–05
