= NK Papuk Orahovica =

Croatian football club

NK Papuk
- Full name: NK Papuk Orahovica
- Founded: 1925.
- Ground: Gradski Stadion
- Capacity: 2,000
- League: MŽNL Bjelovar-Koprivnica-Virovitica
Home colours

NK Papuk is a Croatian football club based in the town of Orahovica in Slavonia, Croatia.
