= NK Čepin =

Croatian football club

- Founded: 1928
- Ground: ŠRC Čepin
- Capacity: 2500
- League: Treća HNL Istok
colours	colours	colours

NK Čepin are a football team from Čepin, Croatia currently playing in the Treća HNL, the third division of Croatian football.

== History ==
The club was founded in 1928 as ŠK Slavonac and then was renamed NK Jedinstvo after the second world war. They would later be renamed NK Čepin after their main sponsor, the local oil company.

NK Čepin played in the Croatian 2. HNL for several years in the mid-1990s. They won the 2017 fourth division local league and as of 2019 play in the third division.

The club was recognised in 2018 for having a number of players with or studying for master's degrees. The club also celebrated its 90th anniversary that year with a match against NK Osijek.

== Supporters ==
NK Čepin has one supporters group called the Sioux, named after the Native American tribe, founded in 1994. They are known for bringing a larger average attendance to NK Čepin matches.
