= NK Metalac Osijek =

Croatian football club

NK Metalac
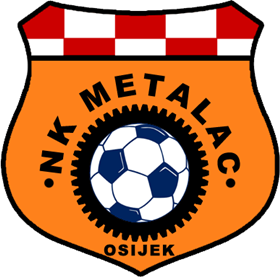
- Full name: NK Metalac Osijek
- Founded: 1948
- Ground: Športski centar Ante Gotovina
- Capacity: 1,500
- Chairman: Boro Ivković
- Manager: Juraj Petrović
- League: Liga NS Osijek
- 2024-25: Liga NS Osijek, 7th
Home colours	Away colours

NK Metalac is a Croatian football club based in the town of Osijek.

It was founded in 1948 as a football section of the newly founded sports club of the same name. The club's colours at the time were black and white. The first coach was Mijo Kiss. The club competed in the group championship until 1950–51, and then played in the regional league of the Osijek group for one season. It was a member of the Osijek I. class in 1952–53, and the following season it was in the Slavonian league. From the 1954–55 season to 1959–60 season it played in the city league. It was in the Slavonian zone from 1960–61 to 1968–69, when after qualifying it entered the II. Yugoslav League – Northern group, where it remained until the 1972–73 season. Before the Croatian independence, it has been in the Podravina group championship of the Slavonian zone until 1988–89, then it competes in the inter-republic provincial league. NK Metalac–OLT has been a member of the II. HNL since the 1992–93 season. Since 1997, it has been playing again as NK Metalac. Since 2000, the club's color has been orange. The club has its own stadium with a capacity of 1,000 spectators. Most important successes: in the Yugoslav Cup in 1953, in the 9th round, it lost 0:1 to Sloboda from Đakovo; in 1998-99, it qualified for the II. Croatian football league; in 2000–01, it participated in the 2nd round of the Croatian Cup finals.

In 2021, the senior side of the club folded due to a lack of players on the squad. It got so bad that the chairman Boro Ivković played few games for the senior side. But in 2024, NK Metalac refounded the senior side, competing in the Liga NS Osijek, finishing last.
