= NK Sloga Nova Gradiška =

Croatian football club

NK Sloga
- Full name: NK Sloga Nova Gradiška
- Founded: 1910
- Ground: Gradski Stadion
- Capacity: 3,000
- Manager: Željko Bakunić
- League: 3.HNL East
- 2014–15: 2. ŽNL Brodsko-Posavska west, 1st (promoted)

NK Sloga is a Croatian football club based in the town of Nova Gradiška in Slavonia.
