= NK Bedem Ivankovo =

Croatian football club

Coordinates: 45°17′2.58″N 18°41′33.54″E

- Full name: NK Bedem Ivankovo
- Founded: 1931
- Ground: Grac
- Capacity: 1,000
- Chairman: Stjepan Šimić
- League: County League
Home colours	Away colours

NK Bedem Ivankovo is a Croatian football club based in the town of Ivankovo. It was founded in 1931.

== History ==
Bedem Ivankovo played one season in the 2. HNL, in 2001–02, but were relegated due to league reorganization.

Bedem Ivankovo played in the 3. HNL for three seasons from 2012–13 to 2014–15 but were relegated. They won the 4. HNL East in 2015–16 and were promoted to the third division again for the 2016–17 season.

The team drew NK Croatia Zagreb in the cup in 1994/95. More than 2,000 spectators watched Ivankovo lose 3–0. The club also played the return leg at the Croatian national stadium Maksimir where they lost 5–3.

The local government invested more than 2 million kuna in NK Bedem's stadium in 2015.

== Honours ==
(Croatia) 4. HNL – East:

- Winners (1): 2015–16
