= NK Rovinj =

Croatian football club

- Full name: Nogometni klub Rovinj
- Founded: 1919; 106 years ago
- Manager: Luciano Zgrablić
- League: 3. NL – West
- 2022–23: 4. NL – Rijeka, 2nd (promoted)
Home colours	Away colours

Nogometni klub Rovinj (Italian: Club Calcio Rovigno) is a Croatian football club based in the town of Rovinj and founded in year 1919. They currently play in the Treća NL.

== History ==
The first matches in Rovinj were played before World War I by Hungarian soldiers on the improvised playground Campolongo.

The first official club was formed in 1919 under the name Fascio Democratico Sportivo. Two years later, the club gets the more appropriate name of Federico Riosa, in memory of the Rovinj resident who left the Austrian army during the war and died fighting on the Italian side. After years of playing friendly and cup matches on the Tiere russe field near the city's railway station, the club entered the first Istrian football championship in 1928. The very next year, work began on the construction of a new football field on Valbruna, where the game was played since 1932.

The first successes came after the club received a new sponsor and name offered by the Ampelea fish canning factory in 1936. Already in the next season, S.C. Ampelea wins the first place in the Istrian League and enters the Second Italian League, and in the last season before the war it played in the Istrian League.

Football was the most popular sport in Rovinj in the second post-war period as well. The club was rebuilt in 1945 by the general Rovinj trade unions under the guidance of the local communist party as the Rovinjsko Sportsko Duštvo, so the club played under the name SD Rovinj. Already in the 1946/47 season the club won the Istrian championship and entered the V zone league.

However, the mass exodus of the Italian speaking population weakened the city team heavily. The club played two seasons under the name Tvornica Duhana. Since the '50s the club has been renamed to NK Rovinj.

Only in the mid-sixties, with a new capable administration, the Valbruna stadium was completed, a new lawn was planted, and the rise of football in Rovinj began. The historical period began in 1970, when Rovinj entered the Second League, in which, for example, Zagreb and Rijeka played.

In the strong competition, Rovinj was too short by a point, but after the new title of zone champion already in the summer of 1972, it reached the new qualifications.

In real euphoria, in which half the city flocked to Valbruna, Rovinj kicked out Zadar and Segesta, but was eliminated by Sloboda from Bosanski Novi in the repechage. They were persistent in the club, so after winning the zone league in June 1973, new qualifications were played. With epic victories over Zadar and Zagreb blue, Rovinj became the champion of Croatia for amateurs, but in the repechage for the newly formed Second League, it was eliminated by Dinamo from Vinkovci.

At the beginning of the 90s, a new rise began. Before the war, Rovinj achieved its greatest success by reaching the round of 16 of the Yugoslav Cup, but due to the unstable atmosphere, the trip to Sarajevo, where Željezničar was supposed to be the host, was abandoned. To compensate, the newly formed Croatian Football Association included the club in the quarter-finals of the Croatian Cup in 1992, in which it was eliminated by Dinamo.

After the first place in the Third League West Rovinj in the 1992/93 season. fought for first place in the Second League South, and in the following season won fifth place. After that, he played in the Second League West until 1999, and then in the Third League West. Due to the reorganization of the competition in the 2006/07 season. Rovinj played in the Fourth League West.

After winning first place until 2012, the club played between the Third Croatian League West and the provincial leagues.

=== Performance in the Croatian Cup ===
1992 quarter finals: HAŠK Građanski - NK Rovinj 6:0 return match: NK Rovinj - HAŠK Građanski Zagreb 0:1

1993/94 sixteenth final: NK Rovinj - NK Istra Pula 2:4 return match: NK Istra Pula - NK Rovinj 1:1

1995/96 sixteenth final: NK Rovinj - NK Belišće 0:5 return match: NK Belišće - NK Rovinj 7:0

2000/01 Qualifying round: NK Rovinj - NK Čakovec 2:3
