= NK NAŠK =

Croatian football club

- Full name: NK Našički športski klub Našice
- Founded: 1919
- Ground: Gradski Stadion
- Capacity: 2,500
Home colours	Away colours

NK NAŠK is a Croatian football club based in the town of Našice in Slavonia. Club is founded in Našice in 1919. From 1995 until 1997, NAŠK was playing in Croatian Second Football League. From 1997, NAŠK is playing again in Croatian Third Football League
