= NK Vrbovec =

Croatian football club

- Full name: Nogometni klub Vrbovec
- Founded: 1924.
- Ground: Gradski stadion kraj Sajmišta
- Capacity: 2,500
- Manager: Tihomir Bradić
- League: Treća HNL
Home colours	Away colours

NK Vrbovec is a Croatian football club based in the town of Vrbovec in Zagreb County. It was founded in 1924 and is now playing in the third tier of Croatian football, Treća HNL – Center.

Their stadium is called Sajmište ("Marketplace") and has a capacity of 3.000 spectators.

== Club names through history ==
- VŠK Zrinski (1924–1945),
- Naprijed (1946–1948),
- Vrbovec (1949–1970),
- Zrinski (1971–1972),
- PIK Vrbovec (1972–2001) (after joining with SD PIK Vrbovec)
- NK Vrbovec (2001–)

== Honours ==
(Croatia) Treća HNL – Center:

- Winners (1): 1998–99

== Ranking by season ==
Season	League	Position/Number of clubs in the league	Croatian cup
2005–06	3. HNL – Center	9th/16 clubs	Not qualify
2006–07	3.HNL – West	10th/18 clubs	Not qualify
2007–08	3. HNL – West	7th/18 clubs	Not qualify
2008–09	3. HNL – West	11th/18 clubs	Not qualify
2009–10	3. HNL – West	9th/18 clubs	Not qualify
2010–11	3. HNL – West	9th/18 clubs	Qualifying round: Vrbovec – Mladost Cernik 4:2, Round of 16: Vrbovec – Zagreb 0:2
2011–12	3. HNL – West	7th/18 clubs	Qualifying round: Vrbovec – Moslavina 2:0, Round of 16: Vrbovec – Inter (Z) 0:1
2012–13	3. HNL – Center	11th/16 clubs	Not qualify
2013–14	3. HNL – Center	4th/16 clubs	Not qualify
2014–15	3. HNL – West	14th/16 clubs	Not qualify
2015–16	3. HNL – West	14th/16 clubs	Not qualify
2016–17	3. HNL – West	12th/16 clubs	Not qualify
2017–18	3. HNL – West	4th/18 clubs	Qualifying round: Virovitica – Vrbovec 3:3 (9:10), Round of 16: Vrbovec – Rijeka 1:3
2018–19	3. HNL – West	11th/18 clubs	Not qualify
2019–20	3. HNL – Center	11th/16 clubs*	Not qualify (*League end at 17th round due virus pandemic)
