= NK Uskok =

Croatian football club

NK Uskok Klis
- Full name: Nogometni Klub Uskok Klis
- Nickname: Bijeli
- Short name: USK
- Founded: 16 August 1930; 96 years ago
- Ground: Iza grada
- Capacity: 1,000
- Chairman: Ivan Rizvan
- Manager: Saša Glavaš
- League: 2.NL
- 2025–26: 6th
- Website: nkuskok.hr
Home colours	Away colours

Nogometni Klub Uskok (English: Football Club Uskok), commonly referred to as "NK Uskok" or "Uskok", is a Croatian professional football club based in Klis.

== Seasons ==
Season	League	Position
1991–92	Dalmatian Football League	1st
1992–93	3. HNL South	1st
1993–94	2. HNL South	7th
1994–95	2. HNL South	1st
1995–96	1. "B" HNL	10th
1996–97	1. "B" HNL	11th
1997–98	2. HNL South	5th
1998–99	3. HNL South	14th
1999-00	1. ŽNL Split–Dalmatia	1st
2000–01	3. HNL South	2nd
2001–02	2. HNL South	4th
2002–03	2. HNL South	3rd
2003–04	2. HNL South	7th
2004–05	2. HNL South	12th
2005–06	3. HNL South	15th
2006–07	3. HNL South	17th
2007–08	3. HNL South	18th
2008–09	4. HNL South	1st
2009–10	3. HNL South	3rd
2010–11	3. HNL South	10th
2011–12	3. HNL South	7th
2012–13	3. HNL South	15th
2013–14	1. ŽNL Split–Dalmatia	6th
2014–15	1. ŽNL Split–Dalmatia	12th
2015–16	1. ŽNL Split–Dalmatia	5th
2016–17	1. ŽNL Split–Dalmatia	3rd
2017–18	1. ŽNL Split–Dalmatia	1st
2018–19	3. HNL South	4th
2019–20	3. HNL South	11th
2020–21	3. HNL South	4th
2021–22	3. HNL South	8th
2022–23	3. NL South	5th
2023–24	3. NL South	7th
2024–25	3. NL South	1st
2025–26	2. NL	6th
