= NK Mladost Proložac =

Croatian football club

- Full name: Nogometni klub Mladost Proložac
- Founded: 1948
- Ground: Šarampov, Proložac
- Capacity: 1,000
- Chairman: Viktor Grabovac
- Manager: Alen Kljenak
- League: 1. ŽNL
- 2015–16: 3rd
Home colours	Away colours

NK Mladost is a football club based in the town of Proložac and currently competes in the 1. ŽNL. For some time club carried the name NK Imotska krajina.
