= Third Football League (Croatia) =

- Founded: 1956 (as 4. HNL)
- Country: Croatia
- Confederation: UEFA
- Number of clubs: 74 (in 5 groups)
- Level on pyramid: 4
- Promotion to: 2. NL
- Relegation to: 1. ŽNL (Note: 3. NL teams from the following counties relegate to their county's 1. ŽNL: Dubrovnik-Neretva County; Split-Dalmatia County; Šibenik-Knin County; Zadar County; Međimurje County; Varaždin County; Koprivnica-Križevci County; Bjelovar-Bilogora County; Virovitica-Podravina County); 4. NL Rijeka (Note: 3. NL teams from the following counties relegate here: Lika-Senj County; Primorje-Gorski Kotar County; Istria County); 4. nogometna liga Središte Zagreb (Note: 3. NL teams from the following city and counties relegate here: City of Zagreb; Zagreb County; Karlovac County; Krapina-Zagorje County; Sisak-Moslavina County); Međužupanijska nogometna liga Osijek – Vinkovci (Note: 3. NL teams from the following two counties relegate here: Osijek-Baranja County; Vukovar-Srijem County); Međužupanijska nogometna liga Slavonski Brod – Požega (Note: 3. NL teams from the following two counties relegate here: Brod-Posavina County; Požega-Slavonia County)
- Domestic cup: Hrvatski kup
- Current: 2025–26

The Treća nogometna liga (English: Third football league), commonly Treća NL or 3. NL, is the fourth tier of the Croatian football league system. The league was reestablished in 2022 following the reconstruction of league system in Croatia. It is operated by the Croatian Football Federation.

== History ==
The fourth Croatian football league was played for the first time in 2006, after the merger of the 2. HNL - North and 2. HNL - South into a single 2. HNL. With the aforementioned changes, part of the clubs from the second league were relegated to the 3. HNL, and part of the clubs from the third leagues, together with the best clubs of the county leagues, formed the newly created groups of the 4. HNL. After the dissolution of the 4. HNL in 2012, inter-county football leagues corresponding to the previous groups of the 4th HNL were founded in some areas.

In earlier championships, the fourth class of football leagues was represented by the First County Football League, except in the 1995–96 seasons and in 1996–97, when with the creation of the 1. B HNL (which in reality represented the second class), the fourth competitive class was actually represented by the 3. HNL. In the 1994–95 season, there was also the 4. HNL, which was then created as a successor to the regional leagues, but did not survive for more than one season, and then functioned under that name only in the territory of Northern Croatia.

== Format ==
The competition takes place in five groups of up to eighteen (18) clubs according to the double point system, and the exact number of participants is determined by the competition regulations. From each group, the last-placed club and as many as necessary for the groups to number 16 clubs must be eliminated.

Groups are formed and managed in the HNS regional centers:

- the center of Rijeka form the West group,
- the center of Zagreb form the Centar group,
- the center of Osijek form the East group,
- the center of Varaždin form the North group,
- the center of Split form the South group.

== Champions ==
=== 2006–2012 ===
Season	Division Center	Division West	Division East	Division South	Division North
2006–07	Lokomotiva Zagreb (group A); Polet Buševac (group B)	Rovinj	Slavija Pleternica	Neretvanac Opuzen (group A); Hrvace (group B)	Omladinac Novo Selo Rok (group A); Virovitica (group B)
2007–08	Maksimir (group A); Metalac Sisak (group B)	Grobničan	Đakovo	Split (group A); Raštane (group B)	Mladost Prelog (group A); Podravac (group B)
2008–09	Špansko (group A); Zelina (group B)	Crikvenica	Lipik	Uskok (group A); Polača (group B)	Sloboda Varaždin (group A); Kalinovac (group B)
2009–10	Radnik Sesvete (group A); Dugo Selo (group B)	Opatija	Otok	Mladost Proložac (group SD); BŠK Zmaj Blato (group DN); Polača (group ŠK-ZD)	Podravina (group A); Slatina (group B)
2010–11	Dubrava (group A); Stupnik (group B)	Vinodol	BSK Bijelo Brdo	Krka Lozovac (group A); Val Kaštel Stari (group B)	Nedeljanec (group A); Mladost Ždralovi (group B)
2011–12	Maksimir (group A); Bistra (group B)	Naprijed	Bedem Ivankovo	Krka Lozovac (group A); Kamen Ivanbegovina (group B); Župa Dubrovačka (group C)	didn't exist

=== 2022–present ===
Key

†	Club gained promotion to the 2. NL

Season	Division Center	Division West	Division East	Division South	Division North
2022–23	Karlovac 1919 †	Krk †	Slavonija Požega	Zagora Unešić	Radnik Križevci †
2023–24	Segesta †	Uljanik †	Slavonija Požega	Zadar	Polet
2024–25	Lučko †	Halubjan	Đakovo Croatia †	Uskok Klis †	Varteks †
2025–26	Inker Zaprešić †	Lokomotiva Rijeka	Slavonija Požega †	Zagora Unešić †	Koprivnica †
