= NK Podravac =

Croatian football club

- Full name: Nogometni klub Podravac
- Founded: 1908
- Ground: Sportski park Podravac
- Capacity: 3,000
- Manager: Vjekoslav Vučeta
- League: Treća HNL – North
- 2012–13: 11th
Home colours	Away colours

NK Podravac is a Croatian football club based in Virje municipality.

== Honours ==
(Croatia) Treća HNL – North:

- Winners (1): 2000–01
