= First County Football League (Croatia) =

- Founded: 1991
- Country: Croatia
- Confederation: UEFA
- Level on pyramid: 5
- Promotion to: 3. NL
- Relegation to: 2. ŽNL
- Domestic cup: Croatian Cup

The Croatian Fourth league (Croatian: Prva županijska liga, or commonly 1. ŽNL) is a county-based fifth-level league in the Croatian football league system. (Note: The name Četvrta HNL (4. HNL) is still used in some regions.)

== Subdivisions ==
The teams in the league are divided into 9 county or inter-county subdivisions, competing in a double round-robin format. At the end of each season, the bottom teams are relegated to the respective county's Second league, which are under the 2. ŽNL, while the winners of each league are either promoted directly to the 3. NL or enter a two-legged playoff to gain promotion.

The leagues are:

- 1. ŽNL Bjelovarsko-bilogorska
- 1. ŽNL Brodsko-Posavska
- 1. ŽNL Dubrovnik-Neretva
- 1. ŽNL Istarska
- 1. ŽNL Karlovačka
- 1. ŽNL Koprivničko-Križevačka
- 1. ŽNL Krapinsko-Zagorska
- 1. ŽNL Ličko-Senjska
- 1. ŽNL Međimurska
- 1. ŽNL Osječko-baranjska
- 1. ŽNL Požeško-slavonska
- 1. ŽNL Primorsko-goranska
- 1. ŽNL Šibensko-kninska
- 1. ŽNL Sisačko-moslavačka
- 1. ŽNL Splitsko-dalmatinska
- 1. ŽNL Varaždinska
- 1. ŽNL Virovitičko-podravska
- 1. ŽNL Vukovarsko-srijemska
- 1. ŽNL Zadarska
- 1. ŽNL Zagrebačka

== See also ==
- Croatian football league system
