= 2009–10 in Croatian football =

First Division champions
- Dinamo Zagreb (12th title)

Second Division champions
- RNK Split

Third Division champions
- Lipik (East); Dugopolje (South); Gorica (West)

Croatian Cup winners
- Hajduk Split (5th title)

Teams in Europe
- Dinamo Zagreb, Hajduk Split, Rijeka, Slaven Belupo

Croatia national team
- 2010 World Cup qualification

The following article presents a summary of the 2009–10 football (soccer) season in Croatia, which is the 19th season of competitive football in the country.

== National team ==
The home team is on the left column; the away team is on the right column.

=== Friendly matches ===
Win Tie Loss

8 October 2009	Croatia	3 – 2	Qatar	Rijeka, Croatia
17:30 CET	Ćorluka 7'; Klasnić 11'; Jelavić 90+1'		Siddiq 45'; Soria 69'	Stadium: Kantrida; Attendance: 5,000; Referee: Cristian Balaj (Romania)

14 November 2009	Croatia	5 – 0	Liechtenstein	Vinkovci, Croatia
17:30 CET	M. Bilić 1', 49'; Srna 10'; Eduardo 23', 47'			Stadium: Stadion Cibalia; Attendance: 10,000; Referee: Mihaly Fabian (Hungary)

3 March 2010	Belgium	0 – 1	Croatia	Brussels, Belgium
20:45 CET		Report (in Croatian)	Kranjčar 63'	Stadium: King Baudouin Stadium; Referee: Gianluca Rocchi (Italy)

19 May 2010	Austria	0 – 1	Croatia	Klagenfurt, Austria
20:30 CET			M. Bilić 86'	Stadium: Hypo-Arena; Attendance: 15,000; Referee: Kevin Blom (Netherlands)

23 May 2010	Croatia	2 – 0	Wales	Osijek, Croatia
19:00 CET	Rakitić 45'; Gabrić 82'	Report (in Croatian)		Stadium: Gradski vrt Attendance: 15,000; Referee: Slavko Vinčič (Slovenia)

26 May 2010	Estonia	0 – 0	Croatia	Tallinn, Estonia
		Report (in Croatian)		Stadium: A. Le Coq Arena; Attendance: 3,000; Referee: Michael Svendsen (Denmark)

=== 2010 World Cup qualifiers ===
20 August 2009	Belarus	1 – 3	Croatia	Minsk, Belarus
	Verkhovtsov 81'	Report	Olić 22', 85'; Eduardo 69'	Stadium: Dinamo Stadium; Attendance: 21,651; Referee: Felix Brych (Germany)

5 September 2009	Croatia	1 – 0	Belarus	Zagreb, Croatia
	Rakitić 24'	Report		Stadium: Maksimir; Attendance: 25,628; Referee: Konrad Plautz (Austria)

9 September 2009	England	5 – 1	Croatia	London, England
	Lampard 7' (pen.), 59'; Gerrard 17', 67'; Rooney 78'	Report	Eduardo 72'	Stadium: Wembley Stadium; Attendance: 87,319; Referee: Alberto Undiano Mallenco (Spain)

14 October 2009	Kazakhstan	1 – 2	Croatia	Astana, Kazakhstan
	Khizhnichenko 26'	Report	Vukojević 10'; Kranjčar 90+3'	Stadium: Astana Arena; Attendance: 10,250; Referee: Claudio Circhetta (Switzerland)

== League tables ==
=== Prva HNL ===
Pos	Team	Pld	W	D	L	GF	GA	GD	Pts	Qualification or relegation
1	Dinamo Zagreb (C)	30	18	8	4	70	20	+50	62	Qualification to Champions League second qualifying round
2	Hajduk Split	30	17	7	6	50	21	+29	58	Qualification to Europa League third qualifying round (Note: Hajduk Split won the 2009–10 Croatian Cup and thus qualified for the third qualifying round of the 2010–11 UEFA Europa League.)
3	Cibalia	30	16	9	5	46	20	+26	57	Qualification to Europa League second qualifying round
4	Šibenik	30	14	8	8	34	37	−3	50	Qualification to Europa League first qualifying round
5	Osijek	30	13	8	9	49	36	+13	47	
6	Karlovac	30	12	11	7	32	23	+9	47	
7	Slaven Belupo	30	11	10	9	44	45	−1	43	
8	Lokomotiva	30	12	6	12	35	38	−3	42	
9	Rijeka	30	10	10	10	49	44	+5	40	
10	Varteks	30	9	9	12	36	43	−7	36	
11	Istra 1961	30	9	8	13	31	40	−9	35	
12	Zadar	30	9	7	14	27	41	−14	34	
13	Inter Zaprešić	30	10	3	17	36	50	−14	33 (Note: Head-to-head record: Inter Zaprešić–NK Zagreb 1–3, NK Zagreb–Inter Zaprešić 0–3.)	
14	NK Zagreb (Note: Despite finishing 14th NK Zagreb eventually avoided relegation as only two second level clubs were granted first division licences by the Croatian Football Federation.)	30	9	6	15	43	49	−6	33	
15	Međimurje (R)	30	8	5	17	37	61	−24	29	Relegation to Croatian Second Football League
16	Croatia Sesvete (R)	30	3	5	22	30	81	−51	14	Relegation to Croatian Second Football League

Source: Sportnet.hr
Rules for classification: 1) points; 2) goal difference; 3) number of goals scored.
For deciding champions, qualification to UEFA Europa League and relegation: 1st points; 2nd head-to-head points; 3rd head-to-head goal difference; 4th head-to-head away goals scored.
(C) Champions; (R) Relegated

=== Druga HNL ===
Pos	Team	Pld	W	D	L	GF	GA	GD	Pts	Promotion or relegation
1	RNK Split (C, P)	26	16	5	5	56	26	+30	53	Promotion to Croatian First Football League (Note: Only RNK Split and Hrvatski Dragovoljac were granted a Prva HNL license for the Croatian First Football League.)
2	Pomorac	26	14	5	7	41	24	+17	47	
3	Hrvatski Dragovoljac (P)	26	11	9	6	35	23	+12	42	Promotion to Croatian First Football League
4	Lučko	26	12	6	8	38	28	+10	42	
5	Solin	26	10	10	6	29	22	+7	40	
6	Vinogradar	26	11	4	11	38	37	+1	37	
7	Rudeš	26	10	7	9	38	38	0	37	
8	Imotski	26	10	5	11	29	31	−2	35	
9	Junak	26	10	4	12	40	49	−9	34	
10	Mosor	26	9	6	11	26	34	−8	33	
11	Suhopolje	26	8	7	11	29	31	−2	31	
12	Vukovar '91	26	7	10	9	31	39	−8	31	
13	Moslavina (R)	26	6	6	14	25	44	−19	24	Relegation to Croatian Third Football League
14	Segesta (R)	26	4	4	18	17	46	−29	16	Relegation to Croatian Third Football League

Source: Druga HNL (in Croatian)
Rules for classification: 1) points; 2) goal difference; 3) number of goals scored.
(C) Champions; (P) Promoted; (R) Relegated

== Honours ==
Competition	Winner	Runners-up
Croatian Cup	Hajduk Split	Šibenik
1. HNL	Dinamo Zagreb	Hajduk Split
2. HNL	RNK Split	Pomorac
3. HNL East Division	Lipik	MV Croatia
3. HNL South Division	Dugopolje	Raštane
3. HNL West Division	Gorica	HAŠK

== Croatian clubs in Europe ==
=== Summary ===
Club	Competition	Final round
Dinamo Zagreb	UEFA Champions League	Third qualifying round
Dinamo Zagreb	UEFA Europa League	Group stage
Slaven Belupo	UEFA Europa League	Third qualifying round
Rijeka	UEFA Europa League	Third qualifying round
Hajduk Split	UEFA Europa League	Third qualifying round

=== Dinamo Zagreb ===
Date	Venue	Opponents	Score	Dinamo scorer(s)	Report
2009–10 Champions League - Second qualifying round
14 July 2009	Republican, Yerevan (A)	(Armenia) Pyunik	0–0		uefa.com
21 July 2009	Maksimir, Zagreb (H)	(Armenia) Pyunik	3–0	Mandžukić, Badelj, Lovren	uefa.com
2009–10 Champions League - Third qualifying round
29 July 2009	Red Bull Arena, Salzburg (A)	(Austria) Red Bull Salzburg	1–1	Mandžukić	uefa.com
4 Aug 2009	Maksimir, Zagreb (H)	(Austria) Red Bull Salzburg	1–2	Papadopoulos	uefa.com
2009–10 Europa League - Play-off round
20 Aug 2009	Maksimir, Zagreb (H)	(Scotland) Hearts	4–0	Mandžukić, Papadopoulos, Vrdoljak, Bišćan	uefa.com
27 Aug 2009	Tynecastle, Edinburgh (A)	(Scotland) Hearts	0–2		uefa.com
2009–10 Europa League - Group stage
17 Sep 2009	Maksimir, Zagreb (H)	(Belgium) Anderlecht	0–2		uefa.com
1 Oct 2009	Dan Păltinişanu, Timișoara (A)	(Romania) Timișoara	3–0	Badelj, Sammir, Morales	uefa.com
22 Oct 2009	Arena, Amsterdam (A)	(Netherlands) Ajax	1–2	Tomečak	uefa.com
5 Nov 2009	Maksimir, Zagreb (H)	(Netherlands) Ajax	0–2		uefa.com
2 Dec 2009	Vanden Stock, Anderlecht (A)	(Belgium) Anderlecht	1–0	Slepička	uefa.com
16 Dec 2009	Maksimir, Zagreb (H)	(Romania) Timișoara	1–2	Scutaru (o.g.)	uefa.com

=== Slaven Belupo ===
Date	Venue	Opponents	Score	Slaven scorer(s)	Report
Europa League - First qualifying round
2 July 2009	Gradski stadion, Koprivnica (H)	(Malta) Birkirkara	1–0	Csizmadia	uefa.com
9 July 2009	Ta' Qali Stadium, Ta' Qali (A)	(Malta) Birkirkara	0–0		uefa.com
Europa League - Second qualifying round
16 July 2009	Gradski Stadion, Kumanovo (A)	(North Macedonia) Milano	4–0	Csizmadia, Vojnović (3)	uefa.com
23 July 2009	Gradski stadion, Koprivnica (H)	(North Macedonia) Milano	8–2	Poredski, Vručina, Tepurić (2), Vojnović (2), Gregurina, Jurić	uefa.com
Europa League - Third qualifying round
30 July 2009	Alfheim, Tromsø (A)	(Norway) Tromsø	1–2	Šafarić	uefa.com
6 August 2009	Gradski stadion, Koprivnica (H)	(Norway) Tromsø	0–2		uefa.com

=== Rijeka ===
Date	Venue	Opponents	Score	Rijeka scorer(s)	Report
Europa League - Second qualifying round
16 July 2009	Josy Barthel, Luxembourg (A)	(Luxembourg) Differdange	0–1		uefa.com
23 July 2009	Kantrida, Rijeka (H)	(Luxembourg) Differdange	3–0	Cerić, An. Sharbini, Ah. Sharbini	uefa.com
Europa League - Third qualifying round
30 July 2009	Kantrida, Rijeka (H)	(Ukraine) Metalist Kharkiv	1–2	Ah. Sharbini	uefa.com
23 July 2009	Metalist Stadium, Kharkiv (A)	(Ukraine) Metalist Kharkiv	0–2		uefa.com

=== Hajduk Split ===
Date	Venue	Opponents	Score	Hajduk scorer(s)	Report
Europa League - Third qualifying round
30 July 2009	Pod Dubňom, Žilina (A)	(Slovakia) Žilina	1–1	Rafael Paraiba	uefa.com
6 August 2009	Poljud, Split (H)	(Slovakia) Žilina	0–1		uefa.com
