= 2012–13 Croatian Second Football League =

Druga HNL
- Season: 2012–13
- Champions: Hrvatski Dragovoljac
- Promoted: Hrvatski Dragovoljac
- Relegated: Šibenik, Radnik Sesvete, Mosor, Junak Sinj, Imotski, Primorac 1929, HAŠK
- Matches: 240
- Goals: 602 (2.51 per match)
- Top goalscorer: Dražen Pilčić (18)
- Biggest home win: Radnik Sesvete 7–1 Vinogradar; Rudeš 7–1 Lučko
- Biggest away win: Radnik Sesvete 1–4 Rudeš
- Highest scoring: Mosor 5–4 Rudeš; Radnik Sesvete 6–3 Dugopolje

The 2012–13 Druga HNL (also known as 2. HNL) is the 22nd season of Croatia's second level football competition since its establishment in 1992. The season started on 18 August 2012 and is expected to end on 1 June 2013.

NK Dugopolje were league champions and earned a place in Croatia's first division, but were unable to complete all the requirement necessary for top league license. None of the teams from 2011–12 season were promoted to 1. HNL.

== Format ==
The league is contested by 16 teams (one more than in the previous season). Only three teams from Treća HNL were granted license for competing in the Druga HNL, but only Primorac 1929 and Zelina were promoted.

Lučko, Šibenik and Karlovac were relegated from 2011–12 Prva HNL and were supposed to participate in the 2012–13 Druga HNL season. But only Lučko and Šibenik fulfilled all the requirements necessary for the second level license, while Karlovac was relegated to Treća HNL. A fourth team, the financially troubled Varaždin, was suspended from the 2011–12 Prva HNL mid-season for not paying its players, and was immediately relegated to the lowest football level possible of the Croatian football league system, being the seventh-tier Third County League.

== Changes from last season ==
The following clubs have been promoted or relegated at the end of the 2011–12 season:

=== From 2. HNL ===
Promoted to 1. HNL

- none

Relegated to 3. HNL

- Marsonia 1909 (12th place)
- Međimurje (13th place)
- Croatia Sesvete (15th place)

=== To 2. HNL ===
Relegated from 1. HNL

- Lučko (13th place)
- Šibenik (14th place)

Promoted from 3. HNL

- Primorac 1929 (3. HNL South runners-up)
- Zelina (3. HNL West winners)

== Clubs ==
Locations of teams in 2012–13 Druga HNL

Club	City / Town	Stadium	2011-12 result	Capacity
Dugopolje	Dugopolje	Stadion Hrvatski vitezovi	1st in 2. HNL	5,200
Gorica	Velika Gorica	Stadion Radnika	7th in 2. HNL	8,000
HAŠK	Zagreb	Stadion na Peščenici	14th in 2. HNL	800
Hrvatski Dragovoljac	Zagreb	Stadion NŠC Stjepan Spajić	8th in 2. HNL	5,000
Imotski	Imotski	Stadion Gospin dolac	5th in 2. HNL	4,000
Junak Sinj	Sinj	Gradski stadion Sinj	10th in 2.HNL	3,000
Lučko	Zagreb	Stadion Lučko	13th in 1. HNL	1,500
Mosor	Žrnovnica	Stadion Pricvić	3rd in 2. HNL	2,000
Pomorac	Kostrena	Stadion Žuknica	2nd in 2. HNL	3,000
Primorac 1929	Stobreč	Stadion Poljud	2nd in 3. HNL South	35,000
Radnik Sesvete	Zagreb	Sv. Josip Radnik	9th in 2. HNL	1,200
Rudeš	Zagreb	ŠC Rudeš	6th in 2. HNL	1,000
Solin	Solin	Stadion pokraj Jadra	11th in 2. HNL	4,000
Šibenik	Šibenik	Stadion Šubićevac	14th in 1. HNL	8,000
Vinogradar	Jastrebarsko	Stadion Mladina	4th in 2. HNL	2,000
Zelina	Sv. Ivan Zelina	SRC Sveti Ivan Zelina	1st in 3. HNL West	1,000

== League table ==
Pos	Team	Pld	W	D	L	GF	GA	GD	Pts	Promotion or relegation
1	Hrvatski Dragovoljac (C, P)	30	16	5	9	39	25	+14	53	Promotion to Croatian First Football League
2	Solin	30	14	9	7	43	39	+4	51	
3	Rudeš (Note: Rudeš were deducted 2 points after fielding an ineligible player in the penultimate round match against Gorica.)	30	14	8	8	47	30	+17	48	
4	Šibenik (Note: Šibenik were deducted 1 point after they fielded an ineligible player, 15-year-old Duje Ćaleta-Car, in the first round match against Radnik Sesvete. According to the competition rulebook, only players over age of 16 can play in a senior match.) (R)	30	13	10	7	42	31	+11	48	Relegation to Croatian Third Football League (Note: Šibenik were denied a license for competing in Druga HNL for the following season and were demoted to the third level.)
5	Vinogradar (R)	30	14	6	10	43	39	+4	48	Relegation to County Football League (Note: Vinogradar withdrew from competing in Druga HNL for the following season and were demoted to the fifth level.)
6	Zelina	30	13	7	10	46	30	+16	46	
7	Pomorac	30	13	7	10	50	38	+12	46	
8	Dugopolje	30	14	4	12	39	42	−3	46	
9	Lučko	30	12	9	9	31	28	+3	45	
10	Gorica	30	10	10	10	40	35	+5	40	
11	Radnik Sesvete	30	12	4	14	42	43	−1	40	
12	Mosor (R)	30	9	11	10	31	40	−9	38	Relegation to Croatian Third Football League
13	Junak (R)	30	10	6	14	34	43	−9	36	Relegation to Croatian Third Football League
14	Imotski (R)	30	9	4	17	26	41	−15	31	Relegation to Croatian Third Football League
15	Primorac 1929 (R)	30	6	10	14	25	43	−18	28	Relegation to Croatian Third Football League
16	HAŠK (R)	30	3	6	21	24	55	−31	15	Relegation to Croatian Third Football League

Source: Druga-HNL.hr, Sportnet.hr (in Croatian)
Rules for classification: 1st points; 2nd goal difference; 3rd goals scored
For deciding champion, promotion and relegation: 1st points; 2nd head-to-head points; 3rd head-to-head goal difference; 4th head-to-head away goals scored
(C) Champions; (P) Promoted; (R) Relegated

== Results ==
Home \ Away	DUG	GOR	HŠK	HRD	IMO	JUN	LUČ	MSR	POM	PRI	RAS	RUD	SOL	ŠIB	VIN	ZEL
Dugopolje		1–1	1–0	2–1	2–1	3–0	2–0	0–1	1–0	1–0	2–0	1–1	0–1	2–4	1–2	0–3
Gorica	1–0		5–2	1–2	3–1	3–0	1–1	1–1	1–1	2–0	0–2	0–0	0–0	2–2	0–1	1–0
HAŠK	2–2	3–4		0–1	1–2	2–1	0–3	1–1	1–2	2–0	0–1	1–0	1–2	0–1	0–3	0–2
Hrvatski Dragovoljac	1–0	1–0	2–0		3–0	1–0	1–1	1–2	4–2	2–0	0–0	3–1	1–0	1–0	0–2	0–0
Imotski	2–3	2–1	1–1	1–3		0–1	1–2	4–0	0–1	1–0	0–1	1–0	0–1	0–0	1–0	3–1
Junak	1–0	3–3	3–1	3–1	0–1		1–2	0–0	0–0	3–1	2–0	3–2	1–0	1–2	2–2	3–2
Lučko	3–0	0–1	2–1	0–0	1–0	1–0		2–0	1–1	0–0	1–0	2–0	1–2	1–1		2–1
Mosor	0–3	2–1	2–0	2–0	0–0	0–0	0–0		1–3	1–1	2–2	5–4	1–1	0–1	1–0	3–0
Pomorac	1–2	0–2	4–1	1–2	3–0	3–1	2–1	4–1		1–2	2–1	1–2	3–1	2–0	5–2	0–2
Primorac 1929	0–1	2–2	1–1	0–3	1–1	0–0	1–0	2–0	2–2		2–1	2–0	1–3	1–1	1–0	0–3
Radnik Sesvete	6–3	0–3	1–0	1–0	2–0	3–2	0–1	0–1	2–0	2–1		1–4	2–2	3–1	7–1	1–3
Rudeš	2–0	3–0	0–0	1–0	1–0	2–0	7–1	1–1	1–1	2–2	1–0		2–2	1–0	1–0	2–0
Solin	3–4	2–0	0–0	1–0	2–1	3–0	3–2	2–2	1–0	0–0	2–0	0–3		2–1	2–1	3–3
Šibenik	1–1	2–1	4–1	2–2	1–2	0–2	1–0	2–0	1–1	2–1	4–0	2–1	1–1		1–1	1–0
Vinogradar	4–0	1–0	1–0	1–3	2–0	1–0	0–0	3–1	2–4	2–1	2–1	1–1	4–1	1–1		1–1
Zelina	0–1	0–0	3–2	1–0	4–0	4–1	0–0	1–0	1–1	3–0	1–1	0–1	4–0	0–2	3–1	

Source: Druga-HNL.hr
Legend: Blue = home team win; Yellow = draw; Red = away team win.

== Top goalscorers ==
The top scorers in the 2012–13 Druga HNL season were:

Rank	Name	Club	Goals	Apps	Minutes played
1	(Croatia) Dražen Pilčić	Pomorac	18	23	1624
2	(Croatia) Željko Sablić	Mosor, Lučko	14	28	2429
3	(Croatia) Ivica Žuljević	Dugopolje	13	26	2164
4	(Croatia) Franjo Tepurić	Šibenik	12	25	2104
4	(Croatia) Vedran Mesec	Zelina	12	28	2437
4	(Croatia) Domagoj Abramović	Gorica	12	29	2557
7	(Croatia) Alen Guć	Solin	11	16	1440
7	(Croatia) Anto Gudelj	Rudeš	11	22	1569
7	(Croatia) Elvis Sarić	Vinogradar, Lučko	11	23	2017
10	(Croatia) Miro Slavica	Šibenik	10	26	1816

== See also ==
- 2012–13 Prva HNL
- 2012–13 Croatian Cup
