= 2010–11 Croatian Second Football League =

Druga HNL
- Season: 2010–11
- Champions: Gorica
- Promoted: Lučko
- Matches: 238
- Goals: 643 (2.7 per match)
- Top goalscorer: Hrvoje Tokić (19)
- Biggest home win: Međimurje 10–0 Vukovar '91
- Biggest away win: Suhopolje 0–7 Lučko
- Highest scoring: Međimurje 10–0 Vukovar '91

The 2010–11 Druga HNL (also known as 2. HNL) was the 20th season of Croatia's second level football competition since its establishment in 1992. RNK Split were league champions and were promoted to Prva HNL at the end of the previous season. The competition started on 21 August 2010 and ended on 29 May 2011.

== Format ==
The league was contested by 16 teams (two more than in the previous season). Despite planned reduction in the number of clubs in Prva HNL for the 2011–12 season (in which the top flight was set to be reduced from 16 to 12 clubs), CFF Assembly on 17 December 2010 delayed the execution of this changes by one year. In that scenario five clubs would have been relegated from top level to Druga HNL and Druga HNL winners promoted to top level, with five teams relegated from Druga HNL to third level.

Instead, Druga HNL will stay at 16 teams with only the last four teams being relegated and the first three teams from 2010–11 Druga HNL earning promotion (if they are granted with top level license). As for promotion from third level, winners of all three divisions of Treća HNL (West, East and South) will be promoted to Druga HNL, while the fourth club will be decided from a qualifying round between second-placed teams from East and West division.

== Changes from last season ==
The following clubs have been promoted or relegated at the end of the 2009–10 season:

=== From 2. HNL ===
Promoted to 1. HNL

- RNK Split (winners of 2009–10 Druga HNL)
- Hrvatski Dragovoljac (3rd place)

Relegated to 3. HNL

- Moslavina (13th place)
- Segesta (14th place)

=== To 2. HNL ===
Relegated from 1. HNL

- Međimurje (15th place)
- Croatia Sesvete (16th place)

Promoted from 3. HNL

- Dugopolje (3. HNL South winners)
- Gorica (3. HNL West winners)
- HAŠK (3. HNL West runners-up)
- MV Croatia (3. HNL East runners-up)

== Clubs ==
Locations of teams in 2010–11 Druga HNL

Club	City / Town	Stadium	2009–10 result	Capacity
Croatia Sesvete	Zagreb	Stadion Mladina	16th in 1. HNL	3,500
Dugopolje	Dugopolje	Stadion Hrvatski vitezovi	1st in 3. HNL-S	5,200
Gorica	Velika Gorica	Stadion Radnika	1st in 3. HNL-W	8,000
HAŠK	Zagreb	Stadion na Peščenici	2nd in 3. HNL-W	800
Imotski	Imotski	Stadion Gospin dolac	8th in 2. HNL	4,000
Junak Sinj	Sinj	Gradski stadion Sinj	9th in 2.HNL	3,000
Lučko	Zagreb	Stadion Lučko	4th in 2. HNL	1,500
Međimurje	Čakovec	Stadion SRC Mladost	15th in 1. HNL	8,000
Mosor	Žrnovnica	Stadion Pricvić	10th in 2. HNL	2,000
MV Croatia	Slavonski Brod	Stadion Stanko Vlajnić-Dida	2nd in 3. HNL-E	10,000
Pomorac	Kostrena	Stadion Žuknica	2nd in 2. HNL	3,000
Rudeš	Zagreb	Stadion u Sigetu	7th in 2. HNL	1,000
Solin	Solin	Stadion pokraj Jadra	5th in 2. HNL	4,000
Suhopolje	Suhopolje	Stadion Park	11th in 2. HNL	8,000
Vinogradar	Jastrebarsko	Stadion Mladina	6th in 2. HNL	2,000
Vukovar '91	Vukovar	Gradski stadion u Borovu naselju	12th in 2. HNL	8,000

== League table ==
Pos	Team	Pld	W	D	L	GF	GA	GD	Pts	Promotion or relegation
1	Gorica (C)	30	20	4	6	54	21	+33	64	
2	Lučko (P)	30	19	2	9	54	28	+26	59	Promotion to Croatian First Football League (Note: Only Lučko were granted top level license, Gorica's license was revoked after appeal from Istra 1961. Third placed Pomorac unsuccessfully tried to obtain it through arbitration.)
3	Pomorac	30	16	8	6	50	23	+27	56	
4	Rudeš	30	15	7	8	52	39	+13	52	
5	Imotski	30	14	6	10	35	32	+3	48	
6	Solin	30	13	6	11	35	33	+2	45	
7	Međimurje	30	12	6	12	53	49	+4	42	
8	Dugopolje	30	10	11	9	39	30	+9	41	
9	Junak	30	10	10	10	40	34	+6	40	
10	Vinogradar	30	12	4	14	43	38	+5	40	
11	Croatia Sesvete	30	12	4	14	37	41	−4	40	
12	MV Croatia	30	11	6	13	42	42	0	39	
13	HAŠK	30	11	5	14	40	42	−2	38	Relegation to Croatian Third Football League (Note: Only two teams from Treća HNL were granted license for competing in the Druga HNL, but only Radnik Sesvete was promoted as Segesta didn't finish the season within top five places.)
14	Mosor	30	9	7	14	32	41	−9	34	Relegation to Croatian Third Football League
15	Vukovar '91 (R)	30	6	2	22	21	83	−62	20	Relegation to Croatian Third Football League
16	Suhopolje (R)	30	5	2	23	22	73	−51	17	Relegation to Croatian Third Football League

Source: Druga-HNL.hr, Sportnet.hr (in Croatian)
Rules for classification: 1st points; 2nd goal difference; 3rd goals scored
For deciding champion, promotion and relegation: 1st points; 2nd head-to-head points; 3rd head-to-head goal difference; 4th head-to-head away goals scored
(C) Champions; (P) Promoted; (R) Relegated

== Results ==
Home \ Away	CRS	DUG	GOR	HŠK	IMO	JUN	LUČ	MEĐ	MSR	MVC	POM	RUD	SOL	SUH	VIN	VUK
Croatia Sesvete		1–0	0–1	2–1	1–1	1–0	1–0	1–0	1–0	3–1	0–0	1–1	1–2	4–0	3–2	4–0
Dugopolje	5–1		2–0	3–0	2–2	2–2	1–1	0–0	2–1	0–0	1–1	2–0	0–0	2–0	4–0	3–0
Gorica	1–0	1–0		2–2	3–1	2–0	2–0	3–1	4–0	3–1	2–1	3–1	4–0	4–0	2–0	3–0
HAŠK	3–2	1–1	2–1		0–1	2–0	0–2	3–1	2–0	3–2	0–0	4–1	2–0	1–0	2–0	3–0
Imotski	3–1	0–1	1–0	1–0		0–0	1–0	2–1	1–0	1–0	0–0	1–0	2–1	4–0	1–2	3–1
Junak	1–1	0–1	0–2	3–1	3–1		3–1	1–1	3–1	1–1	1–1	2–0	0–0	4–0	3–1	2–0
Lučko	1–0	1–0	2–1	3–1	3–0	3–2		3–1	3–0	2–0	2–1	0–1	2–1	2–1	1–0	4–0
Međimurje	3–2	1–1	0–2	1–1	1–1	3–1	0–2		3–1	2–1	2–1	3–0	1–0	5–0	2–2	10–0
Mosor	3–0	1–1	1–1	3–2	1–0	0–0	0–2	6–0		1–0	1–1	2–2	0–1	3–0	1–0	2–0
MV Croatia	1–3	2–2	1–1	1–1	1–0	2–1	1–0	1–2	4–0		1–0	1–3	1–1	1–0	2–1	5–1
Pomorac	2–0	2–1	2–0	3–1	2–1	1–0	5–2	4–1	3–1	1–0		3–1	3–0	0–0	3–0	6–0
Rudeš	2–0	3–0	1–1	2–1	1–1	2–2	3–1	4–2	0–0	4–0	2–1		1–0	4–2	1–0	1–2
Solin	2–1	3–1	2–0	2–0	2–0	0–1	1–0	1–0	2–1	1–2	1–1	2–3		2–0	1–0	5–1
Suhopolje	1–0	2–1	0–2	2–1	1–2	1–1	0–7	1–3	1–2	0–2	0–1	1–4	3–0		2–3	3–1
Vinogradar	1–2	3–0 (Note: Match was abandoned after 72 minutes at the result 3–0 for Vinogradar as Dugopolje was left with only six players on the field. The game was later awarded 3–0 to Vinogradar.)	0–1	1–0	4–1	3–1	0–0	4–0	2–0	2–0	2–0	1–1	1–1	4–1		4–1
Vukovar '91	3–0 (Note: Croatia Sesvete was suspended and thus unable to play the match so the game was awarded 3–0 to Vukovar '91)	1–0	0–2	2–0	0–2	0–2	1–4 (Note: Match was played at Lučko due to severe weather conditions)	0–3	0–0	2–7	0–1	0–3	1–1	3–0	1–0	

Source: Druga-HNL.hr
Legend: Blue = home team win; Yellow = draw; Red = away team win.

== Top goalscorers ==
The top scorers in the 2010–11 Druga HNL season were:

Rank	Name	Club	Goals	Apps	Minutes played
1	(Croatia) Hrvoje Tokić	Mosor, MV Croatia	19	23	1799
2	(Croatia) Nikola Bucković	Vinogradar	15	30	2405
3	(Croatia) Marko Tadić	Rudeš	14	25	1918
3	(Croatia) Matej Jelić	Lučko	14	29	2353
5	(Australia) Tomi Juric	Croatia Sesvete	12	24	1804
5	(Croatia) Mario Garba	Međimurje	12	27	2323
7	(Croatia) Boris Bajto	Gorica	11	26	2208
7	(Croatia) Lovro Šćrbec	Rudeš	11	26	2319
9	(Croatia) Tomislav Ivičić	Pomorac	10	26	1806
9	(Croatia) Martin Šaban	Pomorac	10	26	1975
9	(Croatia) Nikola Rak	Lučko	10	25	2057

== See also ==
- 2010–11 Prva HNL
- 2010–11 Croatian Cup
