= 2013–14 Croatian Second Football League =

Croatian Second Football League
- Season: 2013–14
- Champions: NK Zagreb
- Promoted: NK Zagreb
- Relegated: Solin; Zelina
- Matches: 198
- Goals: 450 (2.27 per match)
- Top goalscorer: Ilija Nestorovski (20)
- Biggest home win: Rudeš 8–0 Zelina
- Biggest away win: Zelina 0–4 Inter Zaprešić
- Highest scoring: Rudeš 8–0 Zelina

The 2013–14 Croatian Second Football League (also known as Druga HNL or 2. HNL) was the 23rd season of Croatia's second level football competition since its establishment in 1992.

NK Zagreb were league champions and earned a place in Croatia's first division, Prva HNL.

== Format ==
The league was contested by 12 teams (four less than in the previous season). Only two teams from Croatian Third Football League were granted license for competing in the Croatian Second Football League, HNK Segesta and HNK Val. Segesta won the qualification playoffs by 3-2 on aggregate and earned a place in Croatian Second Football League.

Zagreb, Cibalia and Inter Zaprešić were relegated from 2012–13 Croatian First Football League.

== Changes from last season ==
The following clubs have been promoted or relegated at the end of the 2012–13 season:

=== From 2. HNL ===
Promoted to 1. HNL

- Hrvatski Dragovoljac

Relegated to 3. HNL

- Šibenik (4th place)
- Mosor (12th place)
- Junak Sinj (13th place)
- Imotski (14th place)
- Primorac 1929 (15th place)
- HAŠK (16th place)

Relegated to County league (fifth tier)

- Vinogradar (5th place)

=== To 2. HNL ===
Relegated from 1. HNL

- Zagreb (12th place)
- Cibalia (11th place)
- Inter Zaprešić (10th place)

Promoted from 3. HNL

- Segesta (3. HNL Center and promotion qualification winners)

== Clubs ==
Locations of teams in 2013–14 Druga HNL

Club	City / Town	Stadium	2012-13 result	Capacity
Cibalia	Vinkovci	Stadion HNK Cibalia	11th in 1. HNL	10,000
Dugopolje	Dugopolje	Stadion Hrvatski vitezovi	8th in 2. HNL	5,200
Gorica	Velika Gorica	Stadion Radnika	10th in 2. HNL	8,000
Inter Zaprešić	Zaprešić	Stadion ŠRC Zaprešić	10th in 1. HNL	5,228
Lučko	Zagreb	Stadion Lučko	9th in 2. HNL	1,500
Pomorac	Kostrena	Stadion Žuknica	7th in 2. HNL	3,000
Rudeš	Zagreb	ŠC Rudeš	3rd in 2. HNL	1,000
Segesta	Sisak	Gradski stadion Sisak	1st in 3. HNL Center	8,000
Sesvete	Zagreb	Sv. Josip Radnik	11th in 2. HNL	1,200
Solin	Solin	Stadion pokraj Jadra	2nd in 2. HNL	4,000
Zagreb	Zagreb	Stadion Kranjčevićeva	12th in 1. HNL	8,850
Zelina	Sv. Ivan Zelina	SRC Sveti Ivan Zelina	6th in 2. HNL	1,000

== League table ==
Pos	Team	Pld	W	D	L	GF	GA	GD	Pts	Qualification or relegation
1	NK Zagreb (C, P)	33	20	7	6	59	26	+33	67	Promotion to Croatian First Football League
2	Cibalia	33	18	5	10	41	39	+2	59	Qualification to promotion play-off
3	Inter Zaprešić	33	16	5	12	47	32	+15	53	
4	Rudeš	33	14	5	14	45	36	+9	47	
5	Sesvete	33	12	11	10	43	40	+3	47	
6	Segesta	33	13	7	13	40	39	+1	46	
7	Gorica	33	13	6	14	32	33	−1	45	
8	Pomorac	33	10	14	9	24	24	0	44	
9	Lučko	33	10	11	12	34	36	−2	41	
10	Dugopolje	33	10	8	15	37	41	−4	38	
11	Solin (R)	33	7	13	13	26	47	−21	34	Relegation to Croatian Third Football League
12	Zelina (R)	33	4	10	19	22	57	−35	22	Relegation to Croatian Third Football League

Source: Druga-HNL.hr, Sportnet.hr (in Croatian)
Rules for classification: 1st points; 2nd goal difference; 3rd goals scored
For deciding champion, promotion and relegation: 1st points; 2nd head-to-head points; 3rd head-to-head goal difference; 4th head-to-head away goals scored.
(C) Champions; (P) Promoted; (R) Relegated

== Results ==
=== Matches 1–22 ===
Home \ Away	CIB	DUG	GOR	INT	LUČ	POM	RUD	SEG	SES	SOL	ZAG	ZEL
Cibalia		4–2	1–1	1–0	1–0	2–2	1–0	1–0	3–2	1–1	0–0	4–2
Dugopolje	3–0		2–1	2–1	2–0	0–1	1–2	3–0	0–0	1–1	0–1	0–0
Gorica	1–0	0–2		1–0	0–2	0–0	1–0	0–2	3–2	4–0	0–1	2–0
Inter Zaprešić	1–3	2–1	1–2		2–1	0–0	3–2	1–0	2–0	5–0	2–1	1–1
Lučko	2–0	2–0	1–0	0–1		0–1	2–1	0–0	0–1	2–2	1–1	1–1
Pomorac	0–0	2–0	1–0	1–0	1–1		2–0	0–0	0–1	1–1	0–0	3–1
Rudeš	0–2	0–0	2–0	2–1	0–0	3–0		3–1	1–0	2–1	1–2	2–0
Segesta	1–2	2–1	2–3	1–0	2–1	2–0	2–1		2–3	1–1	4–1	1–0
Sesvete	2–0	1–1	3–0	3–3	1–0	1–1	1–2	3–1		2–0	2–2	1–1
Solin	4–0	0–1	0–0	1–3	2–1	0–0	0–0	3–2	0–0		1–1	1–0
NK Zagreb	1–2	1–0	0–1	2–0	2–3	1–0	3–0	4–3	4–1	5–0		4–0
Zelina	0–1	0–2	0–3	0–4	0–2	0–2	3–2	1–1	0–0	2–0	0–0	

Source: Druga-HNL.hr
Legend: Blue = home team win; Yellow = draw; Red = away team win.

=== Matches 23–33 ===
Home \ Away	CIB	DUG	GOR	INT	LUČ	POM	RUD	SEG	SES	SOL	ZAG	ZEL
Cibalia				2–1			0–1	1–0	3–1	0–2	1–3	
Dugopolje	1–0		3–1		1–1	0–2						2–2
Gorica	0–1					0–0	2–2	1–1	2–0	0–1		
Inter Zaprešić		3–1	0–1		2–2		1–0				2–0	2–0
Lučko	4–1		1–0			1–0		1–2				1–1
Pomorac	1–2			0–1			0–0	1–0	0–2	2–2		
Rudeš		2–1			5–1			0–2		1–0		8–0
Segesta		1–0		0–0					1–1	2–0	0–2	
Sesvete		4–3		0–2	0–0		1–0				1–1	1–2
Solin		1–1		1–0	0–0				0–2		0–2	
NK Zagreb		3–0	1–0		3–0	3–0	2–0					2–1
Zelina	0–1		1–2			0–0		0–1		3–0		

Source: Druga-HNL.hr
Legend: Blue = home team win; Yellow = draw; Red = away team win.

== Top goalscorers ==
The top scorers in the 2013–14 Croatian Second Football League season were:

Rank	Name	Club	Goals	Apps	Minutes played
1	(North Macedonia) Ilija Nestorovski	Inter Zaprešić	20	30	2622
2	(Croatia) Gabrijel Boban	NK Zagreb	18	31	2353
3	(Croatia) Hrvoje Tokić	Cibalia	16	28	1900
4	(Croatia) Antonio Hrnčević	Segesta	14	26	2138
5	(Croatia) Miroslav Konopek	Rudeš	11	24	2013
5	(Croatia) Domagoj Abramović	Lučko	11	32	2797
7	(Croatia) Jurica Grgec	Zelina	10	27	2361
8	(Croatia) Josip Jurendić	NK Zagreb	9	25	1807
9	(Croatia) Marko Kolar	Sesvete	8	21	1491
9	(Croatia) Lovro Medić	NK Zagreb	8	24	1924

== See also ==
- 2013–14 Croatian First Football League
- 2013–14 Croatian Football Cup
