= 2011–12 Croatian Second Football League =

Druga HNL
- Season: 2011–12
- Champions: Dugopolje
- Relegated: Marsonia 1909; Međimurje; Croatia Sesvete
- Matches: 209
- Goals: 534 (2.56 per match)
- Top goalscorer: Alen Guć (16)
- Biggest home win: Pomorac 7–1 Međimurje
- Biggest away win: Solin 0–7 Rudeš
- Highest scoring: Pomorac 7–1 Međimurje

The 2011–12 Druga HNL (also known as 2. HNL) was the 21st season of Croatia's second level football competition since its establishment in 1992. HNK Gorica were league champions and earned a place in Croatia's first division, which was later denied after getting their top level license revoked. Second placed NK Lučko were the only promoted team at the end of the previous season. The competition started on 19 August 2011 and ended on 20 May 2012.

== Format ==
The league was contested by 15 teams (one less than in the previous season). Only Lučko were granted top level license, Gorica's license was revoked after appeal from Istra 1961. Third placed Pomorac unsuccessfully tried to obtain it through arbitration. Only two teams from Treća HNL were granted license for competing in the Druga HNL, but only Radnik Sesvete was promoted as Segesta didn't finish the season within top five places.

== Changes from last season ==
The following clubs have been promoted or relegated at the end of the 2010–11 season:

=== From 2. HNL ===
Promoted to 1. HNL

- Lučko (2nd place)

Relegated to 3. HNL

- Vukovar '91 (15th place)
- Suhopolje (16th place)

=== To 2. HNL ===
Relegated from 1. HNL

- Hrvatski Dragovoljac (16th place)

Promoted from 3. HNL

- Radnik Sesvete (3. HNL West winners)

== Clubs ==
Locations of teams in 2011–12 Druga HNL

Club	City / Town	Stadium	2010-11 result	Capacity
Croatia Sesvete	Zagreb	Stadion Mladina	11th in 1. HNL	3,500
Dugopolje	Dugopolje	Stadion Hrvatski vitezovi	8th in 2. HNL	5,200
Gorica	Velika Gorica	Stadion Radnika	1st in 2. HNL	8,000
HAŠK	Zagreb	Stadion na Peščenici	13th in 2. HNL	800
Hrvatski Dragovoljac	Zagreb	Stadion NŠC Stjepan Spajić	16th in 1. HNL	5,000
Imotski	Imotski	Stadion Gospin dolac	5th in 2. HNL	4,000
Junak Sinj	Sinj	Gradski stadion Sinj	9th in 2.HNL	3,000
Marsonia 1909	Slavonski Brod	Stadion Stanko Vlajnić-Dida	12th in 2. HNL	10,000
Međimurje	Čakovec	Stadion SRC Mladost	7th in 1. HNL	8,000
Mosor	Žrnovnica	Stadion Pricvić	14th in 2. HNL	2,000
Pomorac	Kostrena	Stadion Žuknica	3rd in 2. HNL	3,000
Radnik Sesvete	Zagreb	Sv. Josip Radnik	1st in 3. HNL - West	1,200
Rudeš	Zagreb	ŠC Rudeš	4th in 2. HNL	1,000
Solin	Solin	Stadion pokraj Jadra	6th in 2. HNL	4,000
Vinogradar	Jastrebarsko	Stadion Mladina	10th in 2. HNL	2,000

== League table ==
Pos	Team	Pld	W	D	L	GF	GA	GD	Pts	Promotion or relegation
1	Dugopolje (C)	28	17	6	5	50	27	+23	57	Promotion to Croatian First Football League declined
2	Pomorac	28	18	2	8	63	30	+33	56	
3	Mosor	28	15	7	6	36	16	+20	52	
4	Vinogradar	28	15	5	8	47	32	+15	50	
5	Imotski	28	11	9	8	26	21	+5	42	
6	Rudeš	28	11	8	9	42	33	+9	41	
7	Gorica	28	10	10	8	27	24	+3	40	
8	Hrvatski Dragovoljac	28	10	10	8	36	37	−1	40	
9	Radnik Sesvete	28	10	9	9	34	31	+3	39	
10	Junak	28	10	9	9	29	27	+2	39	
11	Solin	28	10	5	13	35	45	−10	35	
12	Marsonia 1909 (R)	28	8	6	14	25	50	−25	30	Relegation to Croatian Third Football League
13	Međimurje (R)	28	5	7	16	31	60	−29	22	Relegation to Croatian Third Football League
14	HAŠK	28	6	3	19	33	52	−19	21	
15	Croatia Sesvete (Note: Croatia Sesvete were deducted 1 point) (R)	28	4	4	20	23	52	−29	15	Relegation to Croatian Third Football League

Source: Druga-HNL.hr, Sportnet.hr (in Croatian)
Rules for classification: 1st points; 2nd goal difference; 3rd goals scored
For deciding champion, promotion and relegation: 1st points; 2nd head-to-head points; 3rd head-to-head goal difference; 4th head-to-head away goals scored
(C) Champions; (R) Relegated

== Results ==
Home \ Away	CRS	DUG	GOR	HŠK	HRD	IMO	JUN	MAR	MEĐ	MSR	POM	RAS	RUD	SOL	VIN
Croatia Sesvete		2–2	0–3 (Note: Croatia Sesvete was suspended and thus unable to play the match so the game was awarded 3–0 to Gorica)	3–0	0–2	1–1	1–1	2–3	3–0	0–3	1–2	1–2	0–2	1–4	0–1
Dugopolje	2–0		1–0	1–0	5–0	1–0	1–0	5–0	2–0	2–2	2–1	3–0	1–0	3–1	2–5
Gorica	1–0	3–2		2–0	0–0	1–0	1–1	1–0	0–0	0–0	2–0	0–0	1–0	0–1	0–0
HAŠK	1–2	2–4	3–4		1–2	1–0	1–2	1–1	4–0	0–0	2–4	2–1	0–2	3–0	2–1
Hrvatski Dragovoljac	1–1	4–1	2–1	2–1		0–0	1–2	2–0	2–2	2–1	0–6	1–1	2–0	2–0	1–2
Imotski	1–0	0–1	1–0	2–1	1–0		1–1	3–0	1–1	0–0	0–1	2–0	1–1	1–0	1–0
Junak	2–0	1–0	0–0	4–2	2–1	0–1		1–0	0–0	0–1	0–0	2–4	1–2	1–4	1–0
Marsonia 1909	1–0	0–0	0–0	2–1	1–1	2–1	1–0		2–1	0–2	1–1	1–3	4–0	1–0	1–2
Međimurje	4–1	1–1	4–1	1–2	0–3	0–3	0–0	5–0		1–3	1–2	1–0	3–2	3–3	1–2
Mosor	2–0	0–2	1–0	0–0	3–0	0–0	0–0	2–1	4–0		2–1	0–1	2–0	1–0	3–1
Pomorac	4–0	1–2	4–1	3–0	3–2	5–1	1–0	3–1	7–1	0–1		1–0	2–1	2–1	3–0
Radnik Sesvete	1–0	0–0	1–1	3–1	0–0	0–0	0–2	5–0	3–0	1–2	2–1		1–1	2–1	1–1
Rudeš	0–1	1–1	1–1	3–2	2–2	1–3	1–1	4–0	3–0	1–0	2–1	1–0		0–0	2–1
Solin	3–1	0–1	2–1	1–0	1–1	0–0	1–4	3–1	3–1	2–1	0–2	2–2	0–7		2–0
Vinogradar	3–2	3–2	0–2	2–0	0–0	3–1	2–0	1–1	3–0	1–0	4–2	4–0	2–2	3–0	

Source: Druga-HNL.hr
Legend: Blue = home team win; Yellow = draw; Red = away team win.

== Top goalscorers ==
The top scorers in the 2011–12 Druga HNL season were:

Rank	Name	Club	Goals	Apps	Minutes played
1	(Croatia) Alen Guć	Dugopolje	16	25	2206
2	(Croatia) Ivor Weitzer	Pomorac	14	26	2268
3	(Croatia) Ivan Čurić	Mosor	12	13	1107
3	(Croatia) Martin Šaban	Pomorac	12	14	1227
3	(Croatia) Nikola Bucković	Vinogradar	12	27	1935
6	(Croatia) Hrvoje Tokić	Vinogradar	10	11	917
6	(Croatia) Mario Ćubel	Rudeš	10	27	2229
8	(Croatia) Ivan Božić	Hrvatski Dragovoljac	9	13	1133
8	(Croatia) Antonio Hrnčević	Vinogradar, Radnik Sesvete	9	19	1567
8	(Croatia) Velimir Švarić	Hrvatski Dragovoljac	9	25	2054
8	(Croatia) Franjo Tepurić	Croatia Sesvete, Radnik Sesvete	9	26	2158

== See also ==
- 2011–12 Prva HNL
- 2011–12 Croatian Cup
