= 2002–03 Croatian First Football League =

Croatian First Football League
- Season: 2002–03
- Champions: Dinamo Zagreb; 7th Croatian title 11th domestic title
- Runner up: Hajduk Split
- Relegated: Šibenik; Pomorac
- Champions League: Dinamo Zagreb
- UEFA Cup: Hajduk Split; Varteks; Kamen Ingrad
- Intertoto Cup: Cibalia; NK Zagreb
- Matches: 192
- Goals: 521 (2.71 per match)
- Top goalscorer: Ivica Olić (16)
- Biggest home win: Rijeka 7–0 Zadar
- Biggest away win: Osijek 1–5 Dinamo Z. Zadar 1–5 Varteks
- Highest scoring: Šibenik 6–3 Zadar
- Average attendance: 3,326

The 2002–03 Croatian First Football League, also known as 1. HNL, was the twelfth season of the Croatian First Football League, the national championship for men's association football teams in Croatia, since its establishment in 1992. The season started on 24 July 2002 and ended on 31 May 2003. NK Zagreb were the defending champions, having won their first championship title the previous season. Dinamo Zagreb won the title, after a win against Varteks on 17 May 2003.

== Teams ==
The league format was changed from the previous 2001–02 season and the number of teams were reduced from sixteen to twelve for the 2002–03 Prva HNL. Because of this, the four bottom-placed teams were automatically relegated to Croatian Second Football League at the end of the season, while the 11th placed Šibenik and 12th placed Kamen Ingrad qualified for the Relegation play-offs. Both clubs then went on to win the two-legged play-off ties against second level sides Vukovar '91 and Istra Pula. Therefore, no team was promoted from the 2001–02 Croatian Second Football League and all twelve teams which contested the 2002–03 Prva HNL were also top flight members in the previous season.

=== Changes from last season ===
Teams relegated to the 2002–03 Croatian Second Football League

- 13th placed: Hrvatski Dragovoljac
- 14th placed: Čakovec
- 15th placed: Marsonia
- 16th placed: TŠK Topolovac

=== Summaries ===
The following is an overview of teams which competed in the 2002–03 Prva HNL. Manager list is correct as of 24 July 2002, first day of the season.

Locations of teams in 2002–03 Prva HNL

Team	Manager	Home city	Stadium	Capacity
Cibalia	(Croatia) Mile Petković	Vinkovci	Stadion HNK Cibalia	9,920
Dinamo Zagreb	(Croatia) Miroslav Blažević	Zagreb	Stadion Maksimir	37,168
Hajduk Split	(Croatia) Zoran Vulić	Split	Stadion Poljud	35,000
Kamen Ingrad	(Croatia) Vjeran Simunić	Velika	Stadion Kamen Ingrad	8,000
Osijek	(Croatia) Milan Đuričić	Osijek	Stadion Gradski vrt	19,500
Pomorac	(Croatia) Predrag Stilinović	Kostrena	Stadion Žuknica	3,000
Rijeka	(Croatia) Zlatko Kranjčar	Rijeka	Stadion Kantrida	10,275
Slaven Belupo	(Croatia) Rajko Magić	Koprivnica	Gradski stadion	4,000
Šibenik	(Croatia) Franko Bogdan	Šibenik	Stadion Šubićevac	8,000
Varteks	(Croatia) Dražen Besek	Varaždin	Stadion Varteks	10,800
Zadar	(Croatia) Stanko Mršić	Zadar	Stadion Stanovi	5,860
NK Zagreb	(Croatia) Ivan Katalinić	Zagreb	Stadion Kranjčevićeva	8,850

== First stage ==
Pos	Team	Pld	W	D	L	GF	GA	GD	Pts	Qualification
1	Dinamo Zagreb	22	18	3	1	51	17	+34	57	Qualification to championship group
2	Hajduk Split	22	16	2	4	42	14	+28	50	Qualification to championship group
3	Varteks	22	15	0	7	40	21	+19	45	Qualification to championship group
4	Cibalia	22	9	5	8	28	28	0	32	Qualification to championship group
5	Kamen Ingrad	22	7	9	6	23	22	+1	30	Qualification to championship group
6	NK Zagreb	22	8	6	8	28	30	−2	30	Qualification to championship group
7	Slaven Belupo	22	9	2	11	24	26	−2	29	Qualification to relegation group
8	Osijek	22	6	5	11	21	39	−18	23	Qualification to relegation group
9	Zadar	22	5	6	11	21	40	−19	21	Qualification to relegation group
10	Rijeka	22	5	3	14	23	33	−10	18	Qualification to relegation group
11	Pomorac	22	3	8	11	26	41	−15	17	Qualification to relegation group
12	Šibenik	22	4	5	13	23	39	−16	17	Qualification to relegation group

Source: RSSSF.org
Rules for classification: 1) points; 2) goal difference; 3) number of goals scored.

=== Rounds 1–22 results ===
Home \ Away	CIB	DIN	HAJ	KAM	OSI	POM	RIJ	SLA	ŠIB	VAR	ZAD	ZAG
Cibalia		1–1	4–1	1–1	3–1	1–1	3–1	1–0	3–1	0–1	0–0	2–1
Dinamo Zagreb	4–1		2–1	1–1	6–0	2–1	2–1	1–0	3–1	3–1	3–1	1–1
Hajduk Split	4–0	1–0		0–0	2–0	5–1	2–1	2–0	3–1	3–1	4–0	3–0
Kamen Ingrad	1–0	0–1	1–1		1–0	2–1	2–1	1–0	4–0	0–1	1–1	1–1
Osijek	1–0	1–5	0–2	1–0		2–2	1–1	1–2	1–0	1–2	3–0	2–2
Pomorac	0–0	2–3	0–3	1–1	2–2		1–0	1–1	1–1	1–0	1–2	1–2
Rijeka	2–1	0–1	0–1	2–1	0–1	1–1		0–1	5–1	0–2	3–1	3–2
Slaven Belupo	2–3	1–3	1–0	1–2	4–0	2–1	2–0		2–1	2–1	1–2	0–0
Šibenik	2–1	0–1	0–1	1–1	1–2	3–1	0–0	1–0		1–3	3–3	3–0
Varteks	3–0	0–2	0–1	3–0	2–0	4–2	2–1	2–0	2–1		3–1	2–0
Zadar	0–2	1–3	0–1	1–1	1–0	2–3	1–0	1–2	0–0	1–5		2–1
NK Zagreb	0–1	1–3	2–1	3–1	1–1	2–1	4–1	2–0	2–1	1–0	0–0	

Source: RSSSF.org
Legend: Blue = home team win; Yellow = draw; Red = away team win.

== Championship group ==
Pos	Team	Pld	W	D	L	GF	GA	GD	Pts	Qualification
1	Dinamo Zagreb (C)	32	25	3	4	76	27	+49	78	Qualification to Champions League second qualifying round
2	Hajduk Split	32	22	4	6	56	22	+34	70	Qualification to UEFA Cup qualifying round
3	Varteks	32	18	3	11	52	38	+14	57	Qualification to UEFA Cup qualifying round
4	Kamen Ingrad	32	11	11	10	34	34	0	44	Qualification to UEFA Cup qualifying round
5	Cibalia	32	12	7	13	39	44	−5	43	Qualification to Intertoto Cup second round
6	NK Zagreb	32	9	9	14	40	52	−12	36	Qualification to Intertoto Cup first round

Source: RSSSF.org
Rules for classification: 1) points; 2) goal difference; 3) number of goals scored.
(C) Champions

=== Rounds 23–32 results ===
Home \ Away	CIB	DIN	HAJ	KAM	VAR	ZAG
Cibalia		3–2	1–1	3–2	1–2	2–1
Dinamo Zagreb	3–0		0–1	1–0	5–1	5–0
Hajduk Split	1–0	4–1		2–0	1–0	1–0
Kamen Ingrad	2–0	0–2	1–0		1–0	1–0
Varteks	1–0	0–3	2–2	1–1		3–1
NK Zagreb	1–1	1–3	3–1	3–3	2–2	

Source: RSSSF.org
Legend: Blue = home team win; Yellow = draw; Red = away team win.

== Relegation group ==
Pos	Team	Pld	W	D	L	GF	GA	GD	Pts	Relegation
7	Slaven Belupo	32	12	4	16	37	36	+1	40	
8	Osijek	32	10	9	13	32	51	−19	39	
9	Rijeka	32	9	6	17	40	41	−1	33	
10	Zadar	32	9	6	17	36	71	−35	33	
11	Pomorac (R)	32	7	11	14	42	52	−10	32	Qualification to relegation play-off
12	Šibenik (R)	32	8	7	17	37	53	−16	31	Relegation to Croatian Second Football League

Source: RSSSF.org
Rules for classification: 1) points; 2) goal difference; 3) number of goals scored.
(R) Relegated

=== Rounds 23–32 results ===
Home \ Away	OSI	POM	RIJ	SLA	ŠIB	ZAD
Osijek		0–0	3–2	1–1	1–0	2–1
Pomorac	5–0		1–1	3–2	1–1	4–1
Rijeka	0–0	2–0		2–0	2–0	7–0
Slaven Belupo	0–0	0–1	2–0		3–0	5–0
Šibenik	0–2	2–0	0–0	2–0		6–3
Zadar	3–2	2–1	2–1	1–0	2–3	

Source: RSSSF.org
Legend: Blue = home team win; Yellow = draw; Red = away team win.

=== Relegation play-off ===
10 June 2003

Pomorac	0–0	Inker Zaprešić
	Report (in Croatian)

Stadion Žuknica, Kostrena
Attendance: 2,000
Referee: Vlado Svilokos (Sisak)

14 June 2003

Inker Zaprešić	3–1	Pomorac
Lalić 38'; Eduardo 45', 80'	Report (in Croatian)	Karabogdan 12'

Stadion ŠRC Zaprešić, Zaprešić
Attendance: 4,500
Referee: Željko Širić (Osijek)

== Top goalscorers ==
Rank	Player	Club	Goals
1	(Croatia) Ivica Olić	Dinamo Zagreb	16
2	(Croatia) Boško Balaban	Dinamo Zagreb	15
3	(Croatia) Zoran Zekić	Kamen Ingrad	14
4	(Bosnia and Herzegovina) Marijo Dodik	Slaven Belupo	12
4	(Croatia) Sandro Klić	Rijeka	12
6	(Croatia) Milan Pavličić	Osijek	11
7	(Croatia) Veldin Karić	Varteks	10
7	(Croatia) Petar Krpan	Hajduk Split	10
9	(Bosnia and Herzegovina) Mladen Bartolović	Cibalia	9
9	(Croatia) Ivan Bulat	Šibenik	9
9	(Croatia) Ivica Karabogdan	Pomorac	9
9	(Romania) Dumitru Mitu	Dinamo Zagreb	9

Source: 1.hnl.net (in Croatian)

== Attendances ==
#	Club	Average
1	Dinamo Zagreb	8,281
2	Hajduk	8,250
3	Kamen	4,344
4	Varteks	2,781
5	Rijeka	2,559
6	Zadar	2,469
7	Cibalia	2,306
8	Slaven	2,250
9	Zagreb	2,144
10	Šibenik	1,838
11	Pomorac	1,419
12	Osijek	1,119

== See also ==
- 2002–03 Croatian Second Football League
- 2002–03 Croatian Football Cup
