= Marin Roglić =

Croatian footballer

Personal information
- Date of birth: 16 June 1997 (age 29)
- Place of birth: Split, Croatia
- Height: 1.86 m (6 ft 1 in)
- Position: Winger

Youth career
- 2006–2009: Hajduk Split
- 2009–2014: RNK Split

Senior career*
Years	Team	Apps	(Gls)
2014–2017	RNK Split	15	(0)
2016	→ Junak Sinj (loan)	12	(0)
2017	Radomlje	15	(5)
2018	Vinogradar		
2018–2019	Lučko	15	(3)
2019	Trnje Zagreb		
2020	SV Eltendorf	1	(0)

International career
2014–2015	Croatia U19	2	(0)
- * Club domestic league appearances and goals as of 21:58, 2 June 2020 (UTC)

Marin Roglić (born 16 June 1997) is a Croatian footballer who most recently played for SV Eltendorf.

== Career ==
Marin Roglić started his youth career in HNK Hajduk Split before moving to RNK Split youth setup at the age of 12, and featured in the team that won the Croatian U19 title in the 2014–15 season. He made his debut for RNK Split in the 2014–15 season against Dinamo Zagreb in a game which ended 0–0. He was called up to the Croatia national under-19 football team by Zoran Vulić. He received a runners up medal in the Croatian Football Cup with RNK Split in 2014–15 when they lost on penalties against Dinamo Zagreb. He was sent on loan to the third division team Junak Sinj until the end of the season. He rejoined the RNK Split senior team the following summer and continued to play in the Prva HNL.

On 8 January 2020, Roglić joined Austrian club SV Eltendorf.
