= NK Croatia Orehovica =

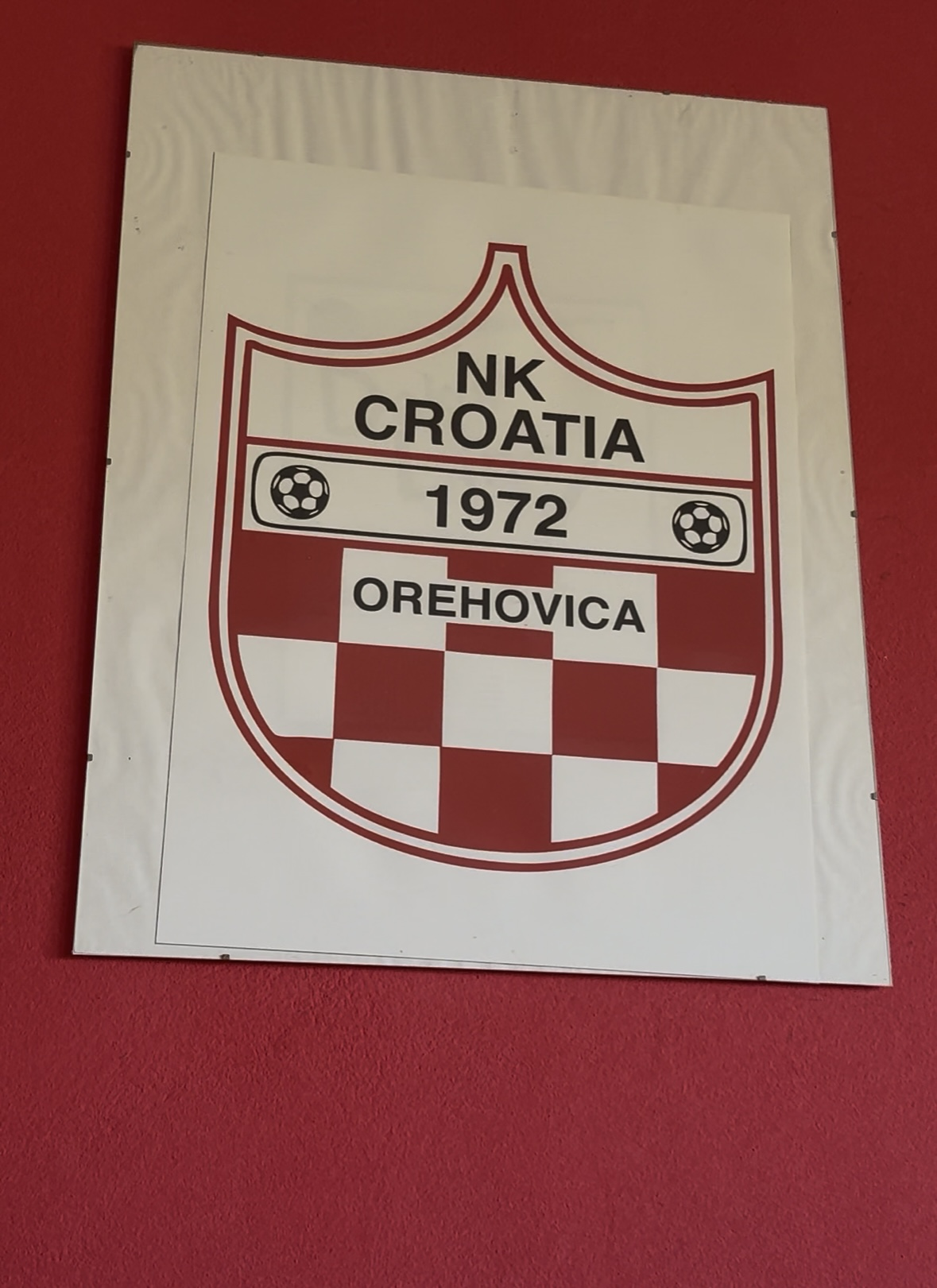
- Full name: NK Croatia Orehovica
- Founded: 1972; 53 years ago
- Ground: Orehovica Ground
- Capacity: 500
- Chairman: Dino Varga
- Manager: Marko Ružić
- League: Četvrta NL Rijeka

NK Croatia Orehovica is a football club from Orehovica, Croatia.

It currently competes in the 2. Medimurska NL, the 5th tier of Croatian Football League System.

== History ==
NK Croatia Orehovica was born on 6 June 1972, when a football club from Orehovica was registered under the name NK Croatia Orehovica at the then Public Security Station in Čakovec. The statute and name of the club were accepted at that time. The founding assembly of the locals with the main initiator Ivan Baranić was held a little earlier on 14 May 1972.

The initiative for the football club and the name actually started a year earlier. However, due to the difficult political situation in Croatia at the time, and the crackdown by the then Yugoslav authorities on everything that had a Croatian connotation, it was very complicated to establish a club with that name. Some people had a lot of inconvenience because of this, they were often invited to "informational interviews", with only one question: Why Croatia? Namely, at that time there was a desire to impose some other name, but after a year of tug-of-war, the authorities finally gave in and registered the club.

According to available data, NK Croatia Orehovica is the second club in Croatia to be named Croatia. Before NK Croatia Orehovica, only one club under that name was founded in Croatia - NK Croatia Đakovo. Only after that did a large number of other football clubs choose a Croatian name, and NK Croatia Zagreb was among the last. However, unlike many other Croatias, including the one in Zagreb, whose name was changed to NK Dinamo, NK Croatia Orehovica has never changed its name in its history, despite numerous political and police pressures.

Over the past years, a large number of people have participated in the work of the club. NK Croatia Orehovica received its first leadership at the founding assembly. The then director of the Orehovica Retirement Home Franjo Levak was elected as the first president. Maks Bali served as secretary, and Josip Šafarić as treasurer. Over the years that followed, a large number of Orehovica residents worked at the club. Some of them have since died, but the tradition of Croatia remains indestructible. The most responsible positions in the club over the past years have been held by: Stjepan Peršić, Stjepan Kamenić, Ivan Piknjač, Franjo Držanić, Dragutin Debelec, Željko Martinec, Damir Poljanec, Ladislav Požgaj, Franjo Piknjač and Željko Vurušić (current) as presidents; Josip Ružić, Franjo Mađarić, Josip Šafarić, Vlado Matjašec, Dragutin Debelec and Alen Ružić, as secretaries; Anđelko Košak, August Kodba, Franjo Drvenkar, Stjepan Farkaš, Josip Čurin, Franjo Piknjač, Zdravko Cvrtnjak, Franjo Markač, Antun Požgaj, Vurušć Željko, Goran Plaftak as treasurers. A number of other residents of Orehovica have been members of the club's board, and a large number of residents are still active today. The greatest contribution to the club and the creation of a new era was made by Predrag Novak, who hired coach Piskac, who took his first steps in football on the old field, and later was a player for Dinamo Zagreb and a first-league player for Steyer Austria and Linz Austria. It should also be mentioned Željko Domjanić, who also took his first steps on the old field, and later was a first-league player for NK Lučko, NK Zagreb and NK Međimurje. Branko Sušec, who was their first coach at that time in the pioneering style, has a great deal of merit in the development of these two great football players.

The biggest action in the club's work was carried out from 1980 to 1982, when a new field was being built. At that time, the then leadership of the Orehovica Local Government Area promised that the old field would be replaced with a new one. An office building was built on the old field, but the Local Government Area did not build a new one, so the club was outmaneuvered and left to its own devices. The new playground was built, thanks to the kindness of the people who worked on the construction of the hydroelectric power plant, so it turned out that they had more ear for solving the problem than the then leadership of the MZ.

During 1984, the club again had problems with the former government, when the club flags were declared Ustasha. However, all of that is now a thing of the past, which, despite all the problems, many of the people who worked at the club all these years are proud of, especially in recent years, when in some areas wearing the name Croatia has become a fashionable trend. Namely, NK Croatia Orehovica is still the club with one of the longest traditions of wearing the name Croatia in Croatia.

However, the most important results that the club has achieved in the sports field. The club's greatest success is reaching the semi-finals of the NSM Cup, in which it was eliminated by the then strongest Međimurje club, MTČ from Čakovec. On two occasions, NK Croatia Orehovica has qualified for the best Međimurje league. The first time was on the 15th anniversary of its existence in 1987 in the 1st Međimurje League, and the second time was in 2002 under the leadership of coach Josip Piskač in the 4th HNL.
