= 2006–07 Croatian Second Football League =

Druga HNL
- Season: 2006–07
- Promoted: Inter Zaprešić (champions); Zadar (playoff winners)
- Relegated: Naftaš HAŠK; Koprivnica; Bjelovar; Čakovec
- Matches: 240
- Goals: 747 (3.11 per match)
- Top goalscorer: Zdravko Popović (30)

The 2006–07 Druga HNL season was the 16th since its establishment. The first placed team were Inter Zaprešić and the last three clubs were relegated to Treća HNL.

== Teams competing in 2006-07 ==
Locations of teams in 2006–07 Druga HNL
- Belišće
- Bjelovar
- Croatia Sesvete
- Čakovec
- Hrvatski Dragovoljac
- Imotski
- Inter Zaprešić
- Koprivnica
- Marsonia
- Moslavina
- Mosor
- Naftaš HAŠK
- Pomorac
- Solin
- Vukovar '91
- Zadar

== League table ==
Pos	Team	Pld	W	D	L	GF	GA	GD	Pts	Promotion or relegation
1	Inter Zaprešić (C, P)	30	21	5	4	60	28	+32	68	Promotion to Croatian First Football League
2	Zadar (P)	30	20	5	5	55	25	+30	65	Qualification to promotion play-off
3	Croatia Sesvete	30	18	5	7	67	38	+29	59	
4	Hrvatski Dragovoljac	30	18	4	8	60	25	+35	58	
5	Solin	30	16	5	9	58	33	+25	53	
6	Imotski	30	12	8	10	41	44	−3	44	
7	Belišće	30	11	9	10	46	40	+6	42	
8	Pomorac	30	11	9	10	53	51	+2	42	
9	Vukovar '91	30	9	8	13	40	42	−2	35	
10	Naftaš HAŠK (Note: Naftaš HAŠK were refused a 2nd level license for 2007–08 season, due to this, Moslavina remained at 2nd level.) (R)	30	8	11	11	44	49	−5	35	
11	Mosor	30	9	8	13	37	46	−9	35	
12	Marsonia	30	9	7	14	38	50	−12	34	
13	Moslavina	30	9	6	15	44	57	−13	33	Relegation to Croatian Third Football League
14	Koprivnica (R)	30	7	8	15	42	66	−24	29	Relegation to Croatian Third Football League
15	Bjelovar (R)	30	4	6	20	25	66	−41	18	Relegation to Croatian Third Football League
16	Čakovec (R)	30	4	4	22	37	87	−50	16	Relegation to Croatian Third Football League

Source: rsssf.org
Rules for classification: 1) points; 2) goal difference; 3) number of goals scored.
(C) Champions; (P) Promoted; (R) Relegated

== Results ==
Home \ Away	BEL	BJE	CRS	ČAK	HRD	IMO	INT	KOP	MAR	MSL	MSR	HAŠK	POM	SOL	VUK	ZAD
Belišće		2–0	0–1	2–3	1–2	2–0	0–2	3–0	4–0	2–1	1–0	3–1	2–2	2–2	0–0	3–0
Bjelovar	4–4		1–2	2–1	0–3	0–3	0–2	1–1	1–2	1–4	1–1	1–1	0–1	1–4	0–2	0–2
Croatia Sesvete	1–1	6–0		3–1	2–1	2–3	1–4	2–1	2–1	1–1	4–2	1–1	4–2	2–1	6–2	1–2
Čakovec	1–2	1–4	0–3		0–1	3–0	2–5	4–2	0–0	1–3	1–1	4–2	1–1	0–3	3–3	1–4
Hrvatski Dragovoljac	3–0	3–1	1–0	10–1		0–0	0–1	1–1	5–2	5–0	3–0	2–0	1–1	2–0	0–2	1–0
Imotski	1–0	0–0	0–1	5–2	1–2		2–0	3–3	2–1	4–1	2–1	1–0	2–1	2–1	1–1	2–4
Inter Zaprešić	2–0	1–0	3–2	4–0	1–0	0–0		2–1	1–0	3–1	1–1	1–1	2–1	3–1	2–1	2–1
Koprivnica	3–3	1–0	0–1	3–2	2–0	3–0	1–7		1–1	1–1	0–0	1–3	3–2	2–3	2–1	1–1
Marsonia	2–0	2–2	1–1	3–2	1–3	2–2	0–1	4–1		1–0	1–0	1–1	1–0	1–0	2–0	0–0
Moslavina	1–3	4–0	0–6	4–0	1–2	5–1	1–0	0–2	2–0		0–2	1–1	2–0	2–2	0–1	0–2
Mosor	1–1	3–0	0–1	2–0	0–4	1–1	1–3	4–3	3–2	2–0		3–0	3–3	0–1	1–0	0–3
Naftaš HAŠK	1–1	4–1	2–2	4–2	0–3	0–1	2–2	2–0	3–2	2–2	1–2		1–2	1–0	0–0	3–2
Pomorac	0–2	1–2	2–1	2–1	1–0	2–1	3–3	4–0	4–3	3–3	4–2	4–4		2–0	2–4	2–1
Solin	3–1	3–1	1–2	4–0	2–0	3–1	3–1	4–1	1–0	6–0	2–0	2–0	1–1		3–1	0–2
Vukovar '91	1–1	0–1	1–5	2–0	1–1	3–0	0–1	4–0	5–2	1–3	2–0	0–2	0–0	1–1		0–1
Zadar	2–0	2–0	3–1	3–0	3–1	0–0	2–0	3–2	3–0	2–1	1–1	2–1	1–0	1–1	2–1	

Source: rsssf.org
Legend: Blue = home team win; Yellow = draw; Red = away team win.

== Top scorers ==
Rank	Name	Club	Goals
1	(Croatia) Zdravko Popović	Croatia Sesvete	30
2	(Croatia) Bernard Gulić	Inter Zaprešić	19
3	(Croatia) Ivan Lišnić	Belišće, Hrvatski Dragovoljac	18
4	(Croatia) Igor Kolarić	Belišće	15
5	(Croatia) Danko Cerovečki	Moslavina	13
6	(Croatia) Petar Krpan	Inter Zaprešić	11
7	(Brazil) Glauver Aranha Pinheiro	Imotski	10
7	(Croatia) Danijel Zlatar	Hrvatski Dragovoljac	10
7	(Croatia) Ivica Karabogdan	Pomorac	10
7	(Croatia) Goran Burčul	Zadar	10
