= Ivan Medvid =

Bosnian retired footballer (born 1977)

Personal information
- Full name: Ivan Medvid
- Date of birth: 13 October 1977 (age 49)
- Place of birth: Split, SR Croatia, SFR Yugoslavia
- Height: 1.79 m (5 ft 10 in)
- Position: Defender

Team information
- Current team: Junak Sinj (manager)

Senior career*
Years	Team	Apps	(Gls)
1998–2001	Posušje	71	(2)
2001–2002	Slaven Belupo	19	(1)
2002–2003	Pohang Steelers	47	(1)
2004–2006	Široki Brijeg	38	(3)
2006–2009	Cibalia	73	(1)
2009–2011	Šibenik	49	(1)
2012	Dugopolje	10	(0)
2012–2014	Junak Sinj	40	(6)
2014–2015	Konavljanin	7	(0)
Total		354	(15)

International career^{‡}
1994	Croatia U21	1	(0)
2001–2005	Bosnia and Herzegovina	5	(0)

Managerial career
- 2014: Junak Sinj
- 2022–: Junak Sinj
- * Club domestic league appearances and goals ‡ National team caps and goals as of 7 October 2007

Ivan Medvid (born 13 October 1977) is a Bosnian retired footballer who played as a defender. He is the current manager of Croatian third-tier outfit Junak Sinj.

== Club career ==
Medvid previously played for NK Slaven Belupo in the Croatian Prva HNL, as well as for NK Posušje, South Korean club Pohang Steelers, NK Široki Brijeg, Šibenik, Dugopolje, Junak Sinj and Konavljanin.

== International career ==
He made his debut for Bosnia and Herzegovina in a February 2001 friendly match against Hungary and has earned a total of 5 caps, scoring no goals. His final international was a February 2005 friendly against Iran.

== Managerial career ==
Medvid succeeded Dean Računica as manager of Junak Sinj in June 2014. He was appointed as interim again in August 2022 after the resignation of Mirko Labrović.

== Honours ==
=== Player ===
Posušje

- First League of Herzeg-Bosnia: 1999, 2000

Široki Brijeg

- Bosnian Premier League: 2003–04, 2005–06

Dugopolje

- Croatian Second Football League: 2011–12
