= Četvrta NL Čakovec-Varaždin =

- Founded: 2014
- Country: Croatia
- Confederation: UEFA
- Number of clubs: 13
- Level on pyramid: 5
- Promotion to: Croatian Third Football League East division
- Relegation to: First League of Međimurje County or First League of Varaždin County
- Current champions: NK Bednja (2021-22)

The Četvrta NL Čakovec-Varaždin (Croatian) also known as the NL ČK-VŽ is a fourth tier league competition in the Croatian football league system. The league was formed in 2014 as the "Međužupanijska liga Čakovec-Varaždin" and in 2017, it changed its name to "Četvrta NL Čakovec-Varaždin". The league covers clubs from Međimurje County and Varaždin County.

== 2022-2023 Teams ==
- NK Ivančica
- NK Nedeljanec
- NK Galeb Oporovec
- NK Zelengaj Donji Kucan
- NK Dinamo Domasinec
- NK Draškovec
- NK Nedelišće
- NK Budućnost Cirkovljan
- NK Budućnost Vidovec
- NK Jalžabet
- NK Mladost Komet Prelog
- NK Naprijed Cirkovljan
- ŠNK Polet Tuhovec

== List of winners ==
Season	Team
2014–15	NK Nedeljanec
2015–16	NK Nedeljanec
2016–17	NK Polet
2017–18	NK Polet
2018–19	NK Polet
2019-20	Abandoned
2020-21	NK Bednja
2021-22	NK Bednja

== See also ==
- Croatian football league system
