= Tomislav Ivičić =

Croatian footballer

Personal information
- Full name: Tomislav Ivičić
- Date of birth: 27 October 1987 (age 39)
- Place of birth: Pakrac, SFR Yugoslavia
- Height: 1.91 m (6 ft 3 in)
- Position: Forward

Youth career
- –2006: Segesta Sisak

Senior career*
Years	Team	Apps	(Gls)
2006–2007	Bjelovar	2	(0)
2007–2008	Križevci	43	(30)
2009	Šibenik	0	(0)
2009	→ Međimurje (loan)	10	(0)
2009–2011	Pomorac Kostrena	47	(16)
2011	Karlovac	11	(0)
2012	Vinogradar		
2012	Samobor		
2013	GOŠK Gabela	14	(6)
2013–2014	Al-Fahaheel	-	(11)
2014–2015	Rudeš	12	(7)
2015	Napredak Kruševac	7	(1)
2016	NK Libertas Novska		
2016	Segesta Sisak		
2017	Dugopolje	10	(2)
2017	Zadar		
2018–2019	Vitez	20	(2)
2019–2020	Schwarz-Weiß Rehden	27	(10)
2020	Rot-Weiß Koblenz	11	(10)
2021	Opatija	4	(0)
2022	Izola		
2023	Libertas	13	(3)
- * Club domestic league appearances and goals

Tomislav Ivičić (born 27 October 1987) is a retired Croatian footballer.

== Club career ==
Born in Pakrac, SR Croatia, he played with NK Bjelovar, NK Križevci, HNK Šibenik, NK Međimurje and NK Pomorac Kostrena between 2006 and 2011. In summer 2011 he joined NK Karlovac and played in the 2011–12 Croatian First League. During 2012 he played with NK Vinogradar and NK Samobor. In the second half of the 2012–13 season he played with NK GOŠK Gabela in the Bosnian Premier League, and in the season 2013–14 he played in Al-Fahaheel FC in the Kuwaiti Premier League. Then he was back to Croatia and played the first half of the 2014–15 season with NK Rudeš in the Croatian Second League. In January 2015 he was abroad again, this time signing with Serbian SuperLiga side FK Napredak Kruševac.

In summer 2017 he joined NK Zadar. On 31 January 2019, Ivičić joined German club BSV Schwarz-Weiß Rehden on a contract until June 2020.
