= Četvrta NL Bjelovar-Koprivnica-Virovitica =

- Founded: 2014
- Folded: 2024
- Country: Croatia
- Confederation: UEFA
- Number of clubs: 15
- Level on pyramid: 5
- Promotion to: Croatian Third Football League North division
- Relegation to: First Leagues of Bjelovar-Bilogora; Koprivnica-Križevci; Virovitica-Podravina Counties
- Last champions: NK Tehničar Cvetkovec (2023-24)

The Četvrta NL Bjelovar-Koprivnica-Virovitica (Croatian) also known as the NL BJ-KC-VT was a fifth tier league competition in the Croatian football league system. The league was formed in 2014 and folded in 2024 when teams from Koprivnica-Križevci County left. Alongside the aforementioned, the league also covered clubs from Virovitica-Podravina County and Bjelovar-Bilogora County.

== 2022-2023 Teams ==
- NK Bilogora '91
- NK Borac Imbriovec
- NK Bratstvo Kunovec
- NK Čazma
- NK Dinamo Predavac
- NK Ferdinandovac
- NK Garić Garešnica
- NK Graničar Legrad
- NK Krčevina
- NK Mladost
- NK Pitomača
- NK Podravac Sopje
- NK Ribar Končanica
- NK Slatina
- NK Virovitica

== List of winners ==
Season	Team
2014–15	NK Kalinovac
2015–16	NK Croatia Grabrovnica
2016–17	NK Garić Garešnica
2017–18	NK Tehničar Cvetkovec
2018–19	NK Tehničar Cvetkovec
2019-20	Season abandoned
2020-21	NK Bilogora 91
2021-22	NK Tehničar Cvetkovec
2022-23	NK Pitomača
2023-24	NK Tehničar Cvetkovec

== See also ==
- Croatian football league system
