= HNK Gorica =

Association football club

Gorica
- Full name: Hrvatski nogometni klub Gorica
- Nicknames: Goričani, Turopoljci
- Short name: GOR
- Founded: 16 July 2009; 17 years ago (as merger of NK Radnik and NK Polet Buševec)
- Ground: Gradski stadion Velika Gorica
- Capacity: 8,000
- President: Ilija Karamatić
- Head coach: Damir Krznar
- League: Croatian Football League
- 2025–26: Croatian Football League, 7th of 10
- Website: www.hnk-gorica.hr
Home colours	Away colours	Third colours

Hrvatski nogometni klub Gorica (English: Croatian Football Club Gorica), commonly referred to as HNK Gorica, is a Croatian professional football club based in the town of Velika Gorica, located just south of the Croatian capital Zagreb. They compete in the Croatian Football League (HNL), the top tier of Croatian football. They play their home matches at Gradski stadion Velika Gorica, which has a capacity of 8,000. They won the 2010–11 Croatian Second Football League.

== History ==
There is a long lasting tradition of football in Velika Gorica and region of Turopolje. First organized clubs were founded during the 1930s but the most prominent football club, NK Radnik, was created in 1945, just after the end of World War II.

Radnik enjoyed average success during Yugoslavia, and its most impressive results came with independence of Croatia. With a newly built stadium for 1987 Summer Universiade Radnik were champions of the first ever Croatian second division. In doing so they were promoted to the highest level Croatian league. Radnik competed there for two seasons, 1992–93 and 1993–94. After being relegated, Radnik started a downfall, obtaining mediocre results which resulted in them playing in the fourth tier of Croatian league football for four seasons (from 2002 till 2006).

During 2009 Radnik got into serious financial troubles and only solution for preserving Velika Gorica's top and most popular football team was a merger with one of financially stable local football clubs. A perfect partner was found in NK Polet from nearby village Buševec. NK Polet had a long lasting football tradition and was a competitive member of Treća HNL. In summer of 2009, merging between NK Radnik and Polet was agreed and HNK Gorica was formed. As a primal mission club stated winning the league title and reaching Croatian Second Football League after many years of absence. The goal was reached during the first season, Gorica won the Treća HNL West and achieved promotion to the Druga HNL for the 2010–11 season.

Before 2010–11 season it was stated that club's ambitions are not high and that everybody would be satisfied with top half finish. But as the season progressed, Gorica proved to be the best club in the league, this culminating with securing the title two rounds before the end of the season. As 2. HNL champion, Gorica earned a place in Croatia's first division, which was later denied after getting their top level license revoked.

Gorica won the 2017-18 Croatian Second Football League after which they were finally granted licence to play in the top tier after many years of being denied. Their league debut (as HNK Gorica) in the 2018–19 season was one of the most surprising and impressing parts of the league, becoming the best league-debutants in history by winning 59 points, as well as beating European contenders Hajduk Split and Osijek twice and the vice-champions Rijeka three times, although still finishing 5th, just 3 points away from reaching the Europa League qualifying rounds. Many foreign players out of contract were bought for free before the season, which turned out to be remarkable signings, most notably Łukasz Zwoliński, Kristijan Lovrić and Iyayi Atiemwen, who was ranked third in the 2018 Prva HNL Player of the year rankings and sold to Dinamo Zagreb over the 2019 transfer window for a record fee.

== Current squad ==
As of 10 September 2026

Note: Flags indicate national team as defined under FIFA eligibility rules; some limited exceptions apply. Players may hold more than one non-FIFA nationality.

No.	Pos.	Nation	Player
1	GK	CRO	Renato Josipović
2	DF	CRO	Filip Braut
4	DF	SWE	Kevin Čustović
5	DF	POR	Gonçalo Costa (on loan from Estoril Praia)
6	MF	FRA	Tom Lacoux
7	MF	MNE	Ognjen Bakić
8	MF	CRO	Jakov Pranjić (on loan from Celje)
9	FW	CRO	Patrik Mijić
10	FW	CRO	Fran Brodić
11	FW	NGR	Wisdom Sule (on loan from Koper)
14	MF	CRO	Stjepan Kučiš
15	DF	SRB	Dušan Stevanović
20	MF	CRO	Luka Vrzić

No.	Pos.	Nation	Player
21	DF	CMR	Hadji Issa Moustapha
24	MF	CRO	Domagoj Pavičić
25	MF	CRO	Bruno Bogojević
26	MF	FRA	Keenan Carole
30	GK	CRO	Darijan Žarkov
32	DF	CRO	Jakov Filipović (Captain)
34	DF	CRO	Ivan Cvijanović
36	MF	CRO	Ante Kavelj
45	DF	AUT	Stefan Perić
50	FW	CRO	Ante Erceg
66	MF	CRO	Juraj Frigan
71	GK	CRO	Davor Matijaš
77	MF	CRO	Mihael Kelava

=== Dual registration ===
Note: Flags indicate national team as defined under FIFA eligibility rules; some limited exceptions apply. Players may hold more than one non-FIFA nationality.

No.	Pos.	Nation	Player
12	GK	CRO	Tin Došen (at (Croatia) Trnje)
18	FW	CRO	Bartol Kardum (at (Croatia) Sesvete)
33	DF	CRO	Lovro Dukić (at (Croatia) Kustošija)

No.	Pos.	Nation	Player
67	DF	CRO	Tomislav Prgomet (at (Croatia) Hrvatski Dragovoljac)
99	FW	KOS	Medin Gashi (at (Croatia) Kustošija)

=== Out on loan ===
Note: Flags indicate national team as defined under FIFA eligibility rules; some limited exceptions apply. Players may hold more than one non-FIFA nationality.

No. / Pos. / Nation / Player; 35 / DF / CRO / Zvonimir Josić (at (Slovenia) Brežice until 20 January 2027)	No. / Pos. / Nation / Player; — / FW / CRO / Fran Stunja (at (Slovenia) Brežice until 30 June 2027)

=== Youth academy ===
Note: Flags indicate national team as defined under FIFA eligibility rules; some limited exceptions apply. Players may hold more than one non-FIFA nationality.

No. / Pos. / Nation / Player; 28 / DF / CRO / Elisandro Kožina Aranha	No. / Pos. / Nation / Player; — / FW / CRO / Francis Chinedu Echue

== Personnel ==
Position	Staff
Head coach	(Croatia) Damir Krznar
Assistant coach	(Slovenia) Aleš Mertelj
Assistant coach	(Croatia) Ivan Senzen
Assistant coach	(Croatia) Stjepan Babić
Goalkeeping coach	(Croatia) Siniša Klafurić
Goalkeeping coach	(Croatia) Tihomir Pereković
Fitness coach	(Croatia) Matija Špičić
Fitness coach	(Croatia) Domagoj Perić
Analyst	(Croatia) Vedran Attias
Physiotherapist	(Croatia) Ivo Gavranić
Physiotherapist	(Croatia) Ivan Bradić
Physiotherapist	(Croatia) Lovro Romić
Sport advisor	(Slovenia) Boštjan Blažinčič
Head scout	(Croatia) Luka Perić
Team manager	(Croatia) Jurica Kovačić
Technical director	(Croatia) Filip Pazman
Kit manager	(Croatia) Franjo Kovačić

== Academy personnel ==
Position	Staff
Director of academy	(Croatia) Slavko Perković
Head of academy	(Croatia) Marko Radenić
Academy coach	(Croatia) Denis Banić
Academy coach	(Croatia) Boris Trivunov
Academy coach	(Croatia) Marko Srebačić
Goalkeeping coach	(Croatia) Leonard Kovačić
Fitness coach	(Croatia) Velimir Jesenšek
Fitness coach	(Croatia) Leon Biondić
Academy analyst	(Croatia) Nikola Brandić

== Honours ==
- Druga HNL
  - Champions (2): 2010–11, 2017–18
- Treća HNL – West
  - Champions (1): 2009–10

== Recent seasons ==
Season	League									Cup	Top goalscorer	
Season	Division	P	W	D	L	F	A	Pts	Pos	Cup	Player	Goals
2009–10	3. HNL	34	25	4	5	63	20	79	1st ↑		Igor Hajduk	20
2010–11	2. HNL	30	20	4	6	54	21	64	1st		Boris Bajto	11
2011–12	2. HNL	28	10	10	8	27	24	40	7th		Tomislav Pek	6
2012–13	2. HNL	30	10	10	10	40	35	40	10th	R2	Domagoj Abramović	12
2013–14	2. HNL	33	13	6	14	32	33	45	7th	R1	Ivan Antolek, Robert Peričić	5
2014–15	2. HNL	30	13	12	5	46	26	51	3rd		Tomislav Kiš	12
2015–16	2. HNL	33	13	8	12	40	40	47	4th	R1	Benjamin Tatar	7
2016–17	2. HNL	33	15	12	6	53	31	57	2nd	PR	Benjamin Tatar	13
2017–18	2. HNL	33	18	8	7	44	29	62	1st ↑	R2	Henrik Ojamaa, Victoraș Astafei	6
2018–19	1. HNL	36	17	8	11	57	46	59	5th		Łukasz Zwoliński	14
2019–20	1. HNL	36	12	13	11	44	48	49	6th	QF	Kristijan Lovrić	14
2020–21	1. HNL	36	17	8	11	60	47	59	5th	SF	Kristijan Lovrić	15
2021–22	1. HNL	36	12	9	15	43	50	45	6th	SF	Kristijan Lovrić, Anthony Kalik	7
2022–23	1. HNL	36	7	11	18	36	50	32	9th	R2	Toni Fruk	7
2023–24	1. HNL	36	11	8	17	35	50	41	7th	QF	Tim Matavž	5
2024–25	1. HNL	36	9	10	17	29	51	37	9th	QF	Martin Šlogar, Marko Kolar	4
2025–26	1. HNL	36	11	8	17	40	48	41	7th	QF		
