= NK Pomorac 1921 =

Croatian football club

Pomorac 1921
- Full name: Nogometni klub Pomorac 1921
- Founded: 1921 (as NK Pomorac); November 2014 (as NK Pomorac 1921)
- Dissolved: October 2014
- Ground: Stadion Žuknica
- Capacity: 3,500
- League: 3. HNL West
- 2020–21: Inter-county League Rijeka, 1st (promoted)
Home colours	Away colours

NK Pomorac 1921 is a Croatian football club based in Kostrena, a suburb of Rijeka which currently plays in Croatian third tier 3. HNL West. The town of Kostrena is known for its maritime tradition, which is reflected in the club's name, as the word "pomorac" means "mariner" or "seaman" in English.

== History ==
Since the independence of Croatia in 1992 NK Pomorac played in Croatian Third Football League until the 1995–96 season, when they were promoted to the Druga HNL. NK Pomorac played in Druga HNL from 1996–97 to 2000–01, when they were promoted to the Prva HNL, Croatian top tier. The club had two seasons in Prva HNL – 2001–02 and 2002–03. Arguably, the 2001–02 season was the most successful in the club's history, as they finished 7th in the league and managed to reach the semifinal of the Croatian Cup. Since 2003, NK Pomorac have played in Druga HNL, where they regularly performed well and finished among the top teams. Pomorac had finished the 2009–10 and the 2011–12 seasons as runners-up, but were denied promotion as they were unable to gain a licence required to compete in top level.

In October 2014, due to financial troubles and increasing debt, NK Pomorac was dissolved after 93 years of existence. In November 2014, the club was re-established as NK Pomorac 1921. In August 2017, the club started competing in the Second League of Primorje-Gorski Kotar County, sixth tier in the Croatian football league system.

== Honours ==
- Druga HNL
  - Runners-up (5): 1996–97 (West), 2000–01, 2003–04 (South), 2009–10, 2011–12
- Treća HNL – West:
  - Winners (2): 1995–96, 1998–99
- Inter-county League Rijeka:
  - Winners (1): 2020–21
- 1. ŽNL Primorsko-goranska:
  - Winners (1): 2019–20
- 2. ŽNL Primorsko-goranska:
  - Winners (1): 2017–18

== Recent seasons ==
Season	League									Cup	Top goalscorer	
Season	Division	P	W	D	L	F	A	Pts	Pos	Cup	Player	Goals
**NK POMORAC**
1992	3. HNL West "A"	14	7	3	4	17	9	17	3rd			
1992–93	3. HNL West	30	14	10	6	46	29	38	3rd			
1993–94	3. HNL West	32	19	6	7	68	22	44	3rd			
1994–95	3. HNL West											
1995–96	3. HNL West	30	24	4	2	68	15	76	1st ↑	R1	Alen Jurić	13
1996–97	2. HNL West	30	22	3	5	63	16	69	2nd			
1997–98	2. HNL West	30	19	5	6	70	17	62	4th			
1998–99	3. HNL West	30	23	4	3	65	15	73	1st ↑		Rajmond Blažić	18
1999–2000	2. HNL	32	17	9	6	49	26	60	4th	PR	Ivan Režić	12
2000–01	2. HNL	34	21	7	6	80	30	70	2nd ↑			
2001–02	1. HNL	30	12	4	14	36	41	40	7th	SF	Marin Prpić	10
2002–03	1. HNL	32	7	11	14	42	52	32	11th ↓	QF	Ivica Karabogdan	9
2003–04	2. HNL South	32	16	10	6	55	39	58	2nd	R1		
2004–05	2. HNL South	32	13	7	12	37	36	46	7th	R2	Nemanja Čorović	16
2005–06	2. HNL South	32	15	13	4	65	31	58	3rd	R1	Edi Petrović	15
2006–07	2. HNL	30	11	9	10	53	51	42	8th	R1	Ivica Karabogdan	10
2007–08	2. HNL	30	14	7	9	42	28	49	4th	R2	David Dujanić	7
2008–09	2. HNL	30	9	5	16	29	45	32	13th	QF	Edi Petrović	6
2009–10	2. HNL	26	14	5	7	39	22	47	2nd	QF	Ivor Weitzer	8
2010–11	2. HNL	30	16	8	6	50	23	56	3rd	R2	Tomislav Ivičić, Martin Šaban	10
2011–12	2. HNL	28	18	2	8	63	30	56	2nd	R1	Ivor Weitzer	14
2012–13	2. HNL	30	13	7	10	51	39	46	7th	R1	**Dražen Pilčić**	18
2013–14	2. HNL	33	10	14	9	24	24	44	8th	R1	Matej Mršić	5
2014–15	2. HNL	9	1	0	8	3	40	3	12th ↓	R1	Dražen Pilčić	3
**NK POMORAC 1921**
2017–18	2. ŽNL	22	21	1	0	100	15	64	1st ↑		**Kristijan Bura**	34
2018–19	1. ŽNL	26	11	4	11	44	32	37	7th		Antonio Tadić	9
2019–20	1. ŽNL	11	9	1	1	34	10	28	1st ↑			
2020–21	4. NL Rijeka	27	15	9	3	47	21	54	1st ↑		Bruno Lončar	19
2021–22	3. HNL West	26	7	5	14	32	62	26	12th ↓		Bruno Lončar	11

=== Key ===
1st	2nd	↑	↓
Champions	Runners-up	Promoted	Relegated

Top scorer shown in bold when he was also top scorer for the division.

- P = Played
- W = Games won
- D = Games drawn
- L = Games lost
- F = Goals for
- A = Goals against
- Pts = Points
- Pos = Final position
- 1. HNL = Prva HNL
- 2. HNL = Druga HNL
- 3. HNL = Treća HNL
- 4. NL Rijeka = Četvrta NL Rijeka
- 1. ŽNL = Prva ŽNL PGŽ
- 2. ŽNL = Druga ŽNL PGŽ
- PR = Preliminary round
- R1 = Round 1
- R2 = Round 2
- QF = Quarter-finals
- SF = Semi-finals
- RU = Runners-up
- W = Winners
