= First League of Primorje-Gorski Kotar County =

- Founded: 1992
- Country: Croatia
- Confederation: UEFA
- Number of clubs: 14
- Level on pyramid: 6
- Promotion to: MŽL Rijeka
- Relegation to: Second League of Primorje-Gorski Kotar County
- Domestic cup(s): Croatian Football Cup; Primorje-Gorski Kotar County Cup

The First League of Primorje-Gorski Kotar County or Prva županijska nogometna liga Primorsko-goranske županije (Croatian), or simply 1. ŽNL Primorsko-goranska, is the sixth level league in the Croatian football league system. The league was formed in 1992. First League of Primorje-Gorski Kotar County covers clubs from the Primorje-Gorski Kotar County. The winner is promoted to 4. HNL Rijeka.

== Members for season 2018–19 ==
Club	City / Town
NK Draga	Mošćenička Draga
NK Klana	Klana
NK Kraljevica	Kraljevica
NK Lokomotiva	Rijeka
NK Lovran	Lovran
NK Matulji	Matulji
NK Omladinac	Fužine
NK OŠK	Omišalj
NK Pomorac 1921	Kostrena
NK Rab	Rab
NK Rikard Benčić	Rijeka
NK Risnjak	Lokve
NK Rječina	Dražice
NK Turbina	Tribalj
