= Dragutin Golub =

Croatian footballer

Personal information
- Full name: Dragutin Golub
- Date of birth: 29 August 1987 (age 39)
- Place of birth: Zagreb, SFR Yugoslavia
- Height: 1.74 m (5 ft 8 1/2 in)
- Position: Right back

Youth career
- –2005: NK Lučko

Senior career*
Years	Team	Apps	(Gls)
2005–2007	Lučko		
2007–2008	Hrvatski Dragovoljac	30	(1)
2009	Moslavina	15	(1)
2009	Koper	2	(0)
2009	Savski Marof	2	(2)
2010	Međimurje	0	(0)
2010	Celje	3	(0)
2011	Rudeš	13	(1)
2011	Šibenik	8	(0)
2012	Rudeš		
2012-2013	Trnje		
2013	Bistra		
2014	SV Mühlgraben	15	(2)
2014	SV Güssing	16	(4)
2015	Bistra		
2015-2016	USV Gabersdorf	24	(11)
2016-2019	SV Union Sturm Klöch	64	(15)
2022	SV Tieschen	9	(1)
- * Club domestic league appearances and goals as of 26 July 2022

Dragutin Golub (born 29 August 1987) is a Croatian retired football right back.

== Club career ==
He spent the last years of his career in the Austrian lower leagues.

== International career ==
Dragutin was a part of the Croatian national under-21 team.
