= NK Mosor =

Association football club in Croatia

- Full name: NK Mosor
- Founded: 1929; 96 years ago
- Ground: Stadion Pricviće
- Capacity: 3,000
- League: 2. ŽNL
- 2022/23: 5th
Home colours	Away colours

NK Mosor, also known as HBDNK "Mosor – Sveti Jure", was a Croatian football club from Žrnovnica, settlement which is part of the city of Split on the Croatian coast.

The club was founded in 1929. It existed until World War II when most of its members enlisted in the army. When the war ended, the club had experienced such a high rate of fatalities that it was disbanded. In 1964 a team was once again formed. Since the 1990s the club has spent most of its time in the second division, never gaining promotion to the first league.

== Honours ==
- Treća HNL – South
  - Winners (3): 1998–99, 2002–03, 2003–04

== Recent seasons ==
Season	League									Cup
Season	Division	P	W	D	L	F	A	Pts	Pos	Cup
1992										
1992–93										
1993–94										
1994–95	2. HNL South	32	14	9	9	52	29	51	5th	
1995–96	2. HNL South	30	19	10	1	59	11	67	2nd ↑	
1996–97	1. B HNL	30	15	5	10	42	28	50	5th	
1997–98	2. HNL South	32	15	8	9	55	33	52	6th	
1998–99	3. HNL South	34	22	7	5	85	22	73	1st ↑	R1
1999–00	2. HNL	32	17	8	7	55	29	59	5th	R2
2000–01	2. HNL	34	15	5	14	43	41	50	8th	PR
2001–02	2. HNL South	30	10	7	13	38	50	37	11th ↓	
2002–03	3. HNL South	28	17	8	3	56	25	59	1st	
2003–04	3. HNL South	30	21	5	4	63	22	68	1st ↑	R2
2004–05	2. HNL South	32	11	11	10	48	49	44	6th	
2005–06	2. HNL South	32	9	9	14	30	53	36	10th	
2006–07	2. HNL	30	9	8	13	37	46	35	11th	
2007–08	2. HNL	30	10	8	12	27	42	38	11th	
2008–09	2. HNL	30	8	6	16	25	44	30	14th	
2009–10	2. HNL	26	9	6	11	26	34	33	10th	
2010–11	2. HNL	30	9	7	14	32	41	34	14th	
2011–12	2. HNL	28	15	7	6	36	16	52	3rd	
2012–13	2. HNL	30	9	11	10	31	40	38	12th ↓	
2013–14	3.HNL South	34	16	10	8	36	28	58	3rd	
2014–15	3.HNL South	34	20	7	7	48	26	67	3rd	
2015–16	3.HNL South	34	8	11	15	37	56	34(−1)	18th ↓	
2016–17	1.ŽNL S-D	26	11	4	11	41	38	37	8th	

=== Key ===
1st	2nd	↑	↓
Champions	Runners-up	Promoted	Relegated

Top scorer shown in bold when he was also top scorer for the division.

- P = Played
- W = Games won
- D = Games drawn
- L = Games lost
- F = Goals for
- A = Goals against
- Pts = Points
- Pos = Final position
- 1. HNL = Prva HNL
- 2. HNL = Druga HNL
- 3. HNL = Treća HNL
- PR = Preliminary round
- R1 = Round 1
- R2 = Round 2
- QF = Quarter-finals
- SF = Semi-finals
- RU = Runners-up
- W = Winners
