= Ivica Karabogdan =

Croatian footballer

Personal information
- Date of birth: 30 November 1969 (age 56)
- Place of birth: Karlovac, Croatia
- Position: Forward

Senior career*
Years	Team	Apps	(Gls)
1996–1997	Karlovac		
1997–1999	Hrvatski Dragovoljac	0	(0)
1999–2000	Istra Pula	0	(0)
2000	Vukovar '91		
2001	Cibalia	25	(5)
2002	Čakovec	4	(0)
2002–2003	Pomorac	13	(9)
2003–2004	Inter Zaprešić	29	(10)
2004–2006	Slaven Belupo	45	(14)
2006	Široki Brijeg	0	(0)
2006	NK Zagreb	7	(1)
2007	Pomorac		
2007–2009	Croatia Sesvete		
- * Club domestic league appearances and goals

Ivica Karabogdan (born 30 November 1969) is a retired Croatian football forward.
