= Četvrta NL Rijeka =

- Founded: 2014
- Country: Croatia
- Confederation: UEFA
- Number of clubs: 13
- Level on pyramid: 5
- Promotion to: Treća NL West
- Relegation to: First League of Primorje-Gorski Kotar County
- Domestic cup(s): Croatian Football Cup; Croatian Super Cup
- Current champions: NK Medulin 1921 (2021–22)

The Fourth Football League Rijeka or Četvrta nogometna liga Rijeka (Croatian), or simply 4. NL Rijeka, is a fifth tier league competition in the Croatian football league system. The league was formed in 2014, after two divisions of 3. HNL were merged into a new 3. HNL West, resulting in relegation of numerous clubs. The league covers clubs from Istria County, Primorje-Gorski Kotar County and Lika-Senj county.

== Members for season 2022–23 ==
Club	City / Town
NK Borac	Bakar
NK Banjole	Banjole
NK Draga	Mošćenička Draga
NK Gospić '91	Gospić
NK Klana	Klana
NK Kraljevica	Kraljevica
NK Mladost	Fažana
NK Naprijed Hreljin	Hreljin
NK Novalja	Novalja
NK Otočac	Otočac
NK Rovinj	Rovinj
NK Veli Vrh	Pula
NK Velevit Žabica	Gospić

== List of winners ==
Season	Team
2014–15	Krk
2015–16	Jadran Poreč
2016–17	Pazinka
2017–18	Grobničan
2018–19	Grobničan
2019–20	cancelled
2020–21	Pomorac 1921
2021–22	Medulin 1921
