= Dražen Pilčić =

Croatian footballer

Personal information
- Full name: Dražen Pilčić
- Date of birth: 24 October 1989 (age 37)
- Place of birth: Rijeka, SR Croatia, Yugoslavia
- Height: 1.76 m (5 ft 9 in)
- Position: Forward

Team information
- Current team: NK Grobničan
- Number: 10

Youth career
- 2004–2005: Opatija
- 2005–2008: Rijeka

Senior career*
Years	Team	Apps	(Gls)
2008	Pomorac	5	(0)
2009	Naprijed Hreljin		
2009–2010	Grobničan	31	(13)
2010–2013	Rijeka	19	(1)
2011–2012	→ Grobničan (loan)	12	(10)
2012–2013	→ Pomorac (loan)	23	(18)
2013–2014	Koper	18	(1)
2014	Pomorac	1	(0)
2015	Bistra	9	(3)
2015–	Grobničan	206	(205)
- * Club domestic league appearances and goals as of 27 April 2024

Dražen Pilčić (born 24 October 1989 in Rijeka) is a Croatian footballer who plays a forward for NK Grobničan.

== Club career ==
While playing for NK Pomorac Kostrena, he was the league's top scorer during the 2012–13 Druga HNL season with 18 goals.

On 30 August 2023 he made the record of goals scored in a single match of Croatian Football Cup (10) during Papuk Osječko 1664–Grobničan 1–29.
