= Second County Football League (Croatia) =

- Founded: 1991
- Country: Croatia
- Confederation: UEFA
- Number of clubs: 371
- Level on pyramid: 7
- Promotion to: 1. ŽNL
- Relegation to: 3. ŽNL
- Domestic cup: Croatian Cup

The Croatian Second County League (Croatian: Druga županijska nogometna liga, or commonly 2. ŽNL) is a county-based sixth level league in the Croatian football league system.

== Leagues ==
The 2. ŽNL features 17 different county leagues and has around 371 teams. While all 17 leagues are part of the 2. ŽNL umbrella, the leagues are completely separate from each other and have no interaction with each other.

The leagues in the 2. ŽNL are:

- 2. ŽNL Bjelovarsko-bilogorska
- 2. ŽNL Brodsko-posavska (Split into 3 groups)
- 2. ŽNL Dubrovačko-neretvanska
- 2. ŽNL Istarska
- 2. ŽNL Karlovačka
- 2. ŽNL Koprivničko-križevačka
- 2. ŽNL Krapinsko-zagorska
- 2. ŽNL Međimurska (Split into 2 groups)
- 2. ŽNL Osječko-baranjska (Split into 5 groups)
- 2. ŽNL Požeško-slavonska
- 2. ŽNL Primorsko-goranska
- 2. ŽNL Sisačko-moslavačka
- 2. ŽNL Varaždinska (Split into 2 groups)
- 2. ŽNL Virovitičko-podravska (Split into 3 groups)
- 2. ŽNL Vukovarsko-srijemska
- 2. ŽNL Zadarska
- 2. Zagrebačka nogometna liga (Grad Zagreb)
- 2. Zagrebačka županijska liga (Split into 2 groups, is the 3rd level of Zagreb County Football and the 7th level of Croatian Football)

== See also ==
- Croatian football league system
