= Domagoj Abramović =

Croatian footballer

Personal information
- Date of birth: 1 April 1981 (age 45)
- Place of birth: Zagreb, SR Croatia, Yugoslavia
- Height: 1.84 m (6 ft 0 in)
- Position: Forward

Team information
- Current team: NK Omladinac Strmec

Youth career
- 1989–1997: Dinamo Zagreb

Senior career*
Years	Team	Apps	(Gls)
1997–2002	Dinamo Zagreb	13	(4)
2001–2002	→ Croatia Sesvete (loan)	20	(16)
2002–2003	Cibalia	30	(4)
2003–2007	Široki Brijeg	81	(34)
2007–2008	Lokomotiva	16	(8)
2008	Inter Turku	12	(7)
2009	Thrasyvoulos Fylis	12	(1)
2009–2010	Olympiacos Volos	30	(9)
2010–2011	Pierikos	8	(0)
2011	Inter Turku	26	(3)
2012–2013	HNK Gorica	29	(12)
2013–2014	Lučko	32	(11)
2014	Sesvete	12	(3)
2015–2016	Vinogradar	14	(5)
2016	Stupnik	11	(2)
2016–2017	Dubrava	25	(8)
2017–2021	NK Nur Zagreb		
2021–	NK Omladinac Strmec		

International career
1997	Croatia U15	1	(0)
1998–1999	Croatia U17	10	(7)
1999–2000	Croatia U18	4	(2)
1999–2000	Croatia U19	8	(3)
2000–2001	Croatia U20	8	(6)
2002–2004	Croatia U21	9	(2)
- * Club domestic league appearances and goals as of 16 August 2016

Domagoj Abramović (Croatian pronunciation: [dômaɡoj abrǎːmovitɕ]; born 1 April 1981) is a Croatian footballer who plays for NK Omladinac Strmec. He was part of the Croatian squad at the 2004 UEFA European Under-21 Championship.

== Career ==
=== Club career ===
Abramović joined NK Dinamo Zagreb as an eight-year-old and scored over 100 goals in various age levels. In 1998, when he was only 17 years old, he debuted in the Dinamo's first team. He came in as a substitute for Mihael Mikić in UEFA Champions League match against Olympiakos.

He had to wait his premier league debut for a season over, until he got his chance in 2000 against NK Cibalia and scored two goals. He did not break into the first team and was loaned to Croatia Sesvete in the second league. After a successful season in Sesvete he was back in Dinamo.

Next season he got 9 matches in the league, all as a substitute. After the season, he moved to Cibalia Vinkovci, hoping to get more playing time. In the next two season with Cibalia, he played in 30 matches and managed to score only 4 goals.

After years in Croatian football he changed country and signed for NK Široki Brijeg in Bosnia and Herzegovina. There he became a leading scorer for the club and lead the club to championship in 2004. He played 4 seasons in Brijeg and scored 34 goals in 81 league matches. In 2007, he moved back to Croatia and Lokomotiva Zagreb. He played 16 matches in the Dinamo's reserve team in third league, until in July 2008, he moved to Finnish Veikkausliiga club FC Inter Turku. He had visited the club already in January, but did not get a contract offer. Abramović won the Finnish championship with FC Inter and was an important part of the winning team.

Abramović left Inter Turku in January 2012, and in March same year he came back to Croatia, signing for HNK Gorica. After helping Gorica to avoid relegation with his 12 goals, Abramović joined their second division rivals NK Lučko. He later played for NK Nur Zagreb.

=== International career ===
Abramović was part of the Croatian youth teams from under-16 to 21, but lost his place after 2004 UEFA European Under-21 Championship due to lack of playing time in club level. He also played in 1998 European Under-16 Football Championship and in 2000 European Under-18 Football Championship.

== Honours ==
=== Club ===
- NK Dinamo Zagreb
  - Croatian Cup: 2001
- NK Široki Brijeg
  - Premier League of Bosnia and Herzegovina: 2004, 2006
- FC Inter Turku
  - Veikkausliiga: 2008
