= Franko Bogdan =

Croatian football manager

Personal information
- Date of birth: 22 August 1965 (age 61)
- Height: 1.94 m (6 ft 4 in)
- Position: Defender

Senior career*
Years	Team	Apps	(Gls)
1987–1989	Hajduk Split		
1989–1992	Borac Banja Luka		
1992–1994	SpVgg Unterhaching	66	(11)
1994–1995	Stuttgarter Kickers	25	(3)
1996–1997	Šibenik	12	(1)

Managerial career
- 2001–2002: Šibenik
- 2003–2004: Šibenik
- 2006-2008: Omladinac Vranjic
- * Club domestic league appearances and goals

Franko Bogdan (born 22 August 1965) is a Croatian retired football defender and later manager.

== Managerial career ==
He managed HNK Šibenik.

Bogdan founded football club NK Adriatic in 2010.
