= First Football League (Croatia) =

Association football league

Prva NL
- Organising body: HNS
- Founded: 1991; 35 years ago
- Country: Croatia
- Confederation: UEFA
- Number of clubs: 12
- Level on pyramid: 2
- Promotion to: HNL
- Relegation to: 2. NL
- Domestic cup: Hrvatski nogometni kup
- Current champions: Rudeš (3rd title) (2025–26)
- Most championships: Cibalia; Inter Zaprešić; Marsonia; RNK Split; Hrvatski Dragovoljac; Šibenik; Rudeš (3 titles)
- Broadcaster(s): MAX Sport
- Website: www.druga-hnl.com
- Current: 2026–27

The Prva nogometna liga (English: First football league), commonly Prva NL or 1. NL, is the second tier of the football league system in Croatia. The league was formed in 1991 with the breakup of Yugoslavia and the dissolution of the Yugoslav Second League. The 1. NL is operated by the Croatian Football Federation, which also was formed in 1991, contributing (along with the newly formed Football Association of Slovenia) to the dissolution of the Football Association of Yugoslavia.

Between the 2001–02 season and 2005–06 season, the league was split in two divisions, one being the Northern Croatian Second League and the other being the Southern Croatian Second League. Each of these two leagues comprised twelve teams playing under a system pretty much identical to the one in the HNL. However, since the start of the 2006–07 season, the First Football League consisted of at least twelve teams from the entire country. Relegation from this division is into the 2. NL.

From the inaugural merged season in 2006–07 until 2021–22, the division was known as the Second Football League (Croatian: Druga nogometna liga), but was renamed as were the other leagues of the Croatian football system for the start of the 2022–23 season.

== Winning clubs ==
Key

Winners that haven't been promoted due to various reasons

Season	Divisions	Division winners	Clubs promoted to HNL	Top scorer	Goals
1992	Zagreb (6 clubs)	Radnik Velika Gorica	Radnik Velika Gorica; Segesta; Belišće; Pazinka		
1992	Dalmatia (8 clubs)	Primorac Stobreč	Radnik Velika Gorica; Segesta; Belišće; Pazinka		
1992	Rijeka & Istra (4 clubs)	Pazinka	Radnik Velika Gorica; Segesta; Belišće; Pazinka		
1992–93	North (16 clubs)	Dubrava Zagreb	Dubrava Zagreb; Primorac Stobreč		
1992–93	South (16 clubs)	Primorac Stobreč	Dubrava Zagreb; Primorac Stobreč		
1993–94	North (16 clubs)	Marsonia	Marsonia; Neretva		
1993–94	South (16 clubs)	Neretva	Marsonia; Neretva		
1994–95	North (16 clubs)	Slavonija Požega	Slavonija Požega; Orijent; Mladost 127; Uskok Klis; Dubrovnik; Hrvatski Dragovoljac		
1994–95	South (17 clubs)	Uskok Klis	Slavonija Požega; Orijent; Mladost 127; Uskok Klis; Dubrovnik; Hrvatski Dragovoljac		
1994–95	West (19 clubs)	Hrvatski Dragovoljac	Slavonija Požega; Orijent; Mladost 127; Uskok Klis; Dubrovnik; Hrvatski Dragovoljac		
1995–96	North (16 clubs)	Slaven Belupo	Slaven Belupo; Olimpija Osijek; Graničar; Čakovec Union; Junak Sinj; Mosor; Samobor; Ponikve; Zagorec Krapina; Napredak Velika Mlaka		
1995–96	South (16 clubs)	Junak Sinj	Slaven Belupo; Olimpija Osijek; Graničar; Čakovec Union; Junak Sinj; Mosor; Samobor; Ponikve; Zagorec Krapina; Napredak Velika Mlaka		
1995–96	West (18 clubs)	Samobor	Slaven Belupo; Olimpija Osijek; Graničar; Čakovec Union; Junak Sinj; Mosor; Samobor; Ponikve; Zagorec Krapina; Napredak Velika Mlaka		
1996–97	Center (16 clubs)	Lučko	None		
1996–97	East (16 clubs)	Croatia Đakovo	None		
1996–97	North (16 clubs)	Budućnost Hodošan	None		
1996–97	South (19 clubs)	RNK Split	None		
1996–97	West (16 clubs)	Jadran Poreč	None		
1997–98	Center (17 clubs)	Segesta	Cibalia		
1997–98	East (16 clubs)	Cibalia	Cibalia		
1997–98	North (16 clubs)	Čakovec	Cibalia		
1997–98	South (17 clubs)	RNK Split	Cibalia		
1997–98	West (16 clubs)	Jadran Poreč	Cibalia		
1998–99	19 clubs	Vukovar '91	Vukovar '91; Istra Pula	(Croatia) Dubravko Zdrilić	29
1999–00	17 clubs	Marsonia	Marsonia; Čakovec	(Croatia) Miroslav Vukić	26
2000–01	18 clubs	Kamen Ingrad	Kamen Ingrad; Pomorac Kostrena; Zadar; TŠK Topolovac		
2001–02	North (16 clubs)	Vukovar '91	None		
2001–02	South (16 clubs)	Istra Pula	None		
2002–03	North (16 clubs)	Marsonia	Marsonia; Inker Zaprešić		
2002–03	South (16 clubs)	Inker Zaprešić	Marsonia; Inker Zaprešić		
2003–04	North (16 clubs)	Međimurje	Međimurje; Pula 1856		
2003–04	South (16 clubs)	Pula 1856	Međimurje; Pula 1856		
2004–05	North (16 clubs)	Cibalia	Cibalia		
2004–05	South (16 clubs)	Novalja	Cibalia		
2005–06	North (16 clubs)	Belišće	Šibenik		
2005–06	South (16 clubs)	Šibenik	Šibenik		
2006–07	16 clubs	Inter Zaprešić	Inter Zaprešić; Zadar	(Croatia) Zdravko Popović	30
2007–08	16 clubs	Croatia Sesvete	Croatia Sesvete	(Croatia) Marijan Maruna	19
2008–09	16 clubs	Istra 1961	Istra 1961; Karlovac; Lokomotiva; Međimurje	(Croatia) Marijan Vuka	19
2009–10	14 clubs	RNK Split	RNK Split; Hrvatski Dragovoljac	(Croatia) Romano Obilinović	17
2010–11	16 clubs	Gorica	Lučko	(Croatia) Hrvoje Tokić	19
2011–12	15 clubs	Dugopolje	None	(Croatia) Alen Guć	16
2012–13	16 clubs	Hrvatski Dragovoljac	Hrvatski Dragovoljac	(Croatia) Dražen Pilčić	18
2013–14	12 clubs	NK Zagreb	NK Zagreb	(North Macedonia) Ilija Nestorovski	20
2014–15	12 clubs	Inter Zaprešić	Inter Zaprešić	(North Macedonia) Ilija Nestorovski	24
2015–16	12 clubs	Cibalia	Cibalia	(Croatia) Frane Vitaić	15
2016–17	12 clubs	Rudeš	Rudeš	(Bosnia and Herzegovina) Benjamin Tatar	13
2017–18	12 clubs	Gorica	Gorica	(Croatia) Domagoj Drožđek	16
2018–19	14 clubs	Varaždin	Varaždin	(Croatia) Leon Benko	21
2019–20	16 clubs	Šibenik	Šibenik	(Croatia) Mijo Šabić	12
2020–21	18 clubs	Hrvatski Dragovoljac	Hrvatski Dragovoljac	(Croatia) Marko Dabro	30
2021–22	16 clubs	Varaždin	Varaždin	(Croatia) Ivan Durdov	13
2022–23	12 clubs	Rudeš	Rudeš	(Croatia) Ivor Ljubanović	14
2023–24	12 clubs	Šibenik	Šibenik	(Croatia) Dominik Dogan	23
2024–25	12 clubs	Vukovar 1991	Vukovar 1991	(Bosnia and Herzegovina) Ajdin Mujagić	15
2025–26	12 clubs	Rudeš	Rudeš	(Croatia) Ivan Šaranić	15
