= Franjo Tepurić =

Croatian footballer

Personal information
- Date of birth: 10 February 1990 (age 36)
- Place of birth: Jajce, SFR Yugoslavia
- Height: 1.88 m (6 ft 2 in)
- Position: Forward

Team information
- Current team: Bergsøy

Senior career*
Years	Team	Apps	(Gls)
2006–2011	Slaven Belupo	43	(5)
2007	→ Koprivnica (loan)	13	(3)
2011	→ Istra 1961 (loan)	6	(1)
2011–2012	Croatia Sesvete	13	(6)
2012	Radnik Sesvete	13	(3)
2012–2013	Šibenik	24	(12)
2013–2014	Hødd	25	(3)
2013–2014	→ Hødd B	19	(10)
2015–	Bergsøy	136	(110)

International career^{‡}
2005–2006	Croatia U16	11	(4)
2006	Croatia U17	8	(1)
2008	Croatia U18	4	(2)
2008	Croatia U19	7	(1)
2010	Croatia U20	1	(0)
2009–2010	Croatia U21	2	(0)
- * Club domestic league appearances and goals as of 130 December 2022 ‡ National team caps and goals as of 10 August 2010

Franjo Tepurić (born 10 February 1990, in Jajce) is a Croatian football striker, currently playing for Bergsøy IL in the Norwegian Third Division.
