= NK Marsonia 1909 =

Croatian football club

- Full name: Nogometni klub Marsonia 1909
- Nicknames: "Marsa", "Savski galebovi" (Sava Gulls)
- Founded: 1909; 117 years ago
- Ground: Stanko Vlajnić-Dida
- Capacity: 10,000
- League: Second League
Home colours	Away colours

NK Marsonia 1909 is a Croatian professional football club based in the city of Slavonski Brod. Before merger with NK Marsonia in August 2011, the club was known under the name MV Croatia.

== History ==
=== MV Croatia years ===
MV Croatia logo

MV Croatia was founded in 1976 under the name Croatia Slavonski Brod. The club added the initials "MV" after the Croatian War of Independence to honor its two members Miroslav Marić and Ante Vrbat who lost their lives fighting the Serbian forces that tried to occupy the city of Slavonski Brod.

MV Croatia spent most of its history in lower Croatian leagues and its first major success was participation in Croatian second division for the season 2010–11, becoming the prominent club in Slavonski Brod.

=== Formation of Marsonia 1909 ===
On August 1, 2011, agreement was made of merging MV Croatia and NK Marsonia into one club that will take over the tradition of most successful and most beloved city's club (Marsonia) and will compete in Croatian second division according to MV Croatia's results. NK Marsonia will still continue to exist under the same name and it will serve as a reserve team of NK Marsonia 1909.
