= Gradski stadion (Sinj) =

Football stadium in Sinj, Croatia

Coordinates: 43°42′10″N 16°39′14″E

Gradski stadion Sinj
- Interactive map of Gradski stadion Sinj
- Location: Sinj, Croatia
- Operator: NK Junak Sinj
- Capacity: 3,096
- Surface: Grass

Construction
- Built: 2006

Tenant
- NK Junak Sinj

Gradski stadion Sinj is a football stadium in Sinj, Croatia. It was built in 2006 and serves as home stadium for NK Junak Sinj football club. The stadium has a capacity of 3,096 spectators (3,075 seated).
