= Stadion Lučko =

Football stadium in Zagreb, Croatia

Coordinates: 45°45′46.9″N 15°52′7.6″E

- Interactive map of Stadion Lučko
- Location: Zagreb, Croatia
- Operator: NK Lučko
- Capacity: 1,500
- Surface: Grass

Construction
- Opened: 1973
- Renovated: 1997, 2005, 2007

Tenant
- NK Lučko

Stadion Lučko is a football stadium in the Lučko neighbourhood of Zagreb, Croatia. It serves as home stadium for NK Lučko football club. The stadium was opened in 1973 and received a new pitch in 1987. The most significant renovations took place in the late 2000s, when two roof-covered stands were built. This made the club eligible for promotion to the top tier of Croatian club football. The stadium has a capacity of 1,500 spectators.
