= HNK Vukovar '91 =

Croatian football club

- Full name: Hrvatski nogometni klub Vukovar '91
- Founded: 1991
- Dissolved: February 2012
- Ground: Gradski stadion u Borovu Naselju
- Capacity: 6,000
Home colours	Away colours

HNK Vukovar '91 was a Croatian football club based in the river port of Vukovar.

== History ==
Under the name NK Vukovar '91, club was founded in Zagreb by Vukovar refugees during the Croatian War of Independence. In 1992, newly founded Vukovar '91 merged with NK Sloga, an older club based in Vukovar.

The club's greatest success came in the 1998–99 season, when Vukovar won the Croatian second division, earning the team promotion to the Prva HNL. They lasted only one season in the top flight and were relegated after finishing last.

In the 2001–02 season, they finished first in the North Division of Druga HNL but were defeated by Šibenik in a two-legged promotion play-off. In the 2007–08 season they were relegated from Druga HNL, but managed to come back after just one season in the third tier of Croatian football. Their third spell in Druga HNL did not last long and they were relegated once again at the end of 2010–11 season.

In January 2012, the club stepped out from Treća HNL East due to financial difficulties. On 8 February 2012, it was announced that the club was officially dissolved due to high debts. In the summer of 2012, a new club under the name Vukovar 1991 was formed.

== List of seasons ==
Season	League									Cup	Top goalscorer	
Season	Division	P	W	D	L	F	A	Pts	Pos	Cup	Player	Goals
1992												
1992–93												
1993–94												
1994–95												
1995–96	Club froze its status due to peaceful reintegration of Podunavlje after Croatian War of Independence											
1996–97	Club froze its status due to peaceful reintegration of Podunavlje after Croatian War of Independence											
1997–98	Club froze its status due to peaceful reintegration of Podunavlje after Croatian War of Independence											
1998–99	2. HNL	36	22	8	6	69	29	74	1st ↑			
1999–2000	1. HNL	33	7	9	17	32	56	30	12th ↓	R1	Amarildo Zela	10
2000–01	2. HNL	34	13	5	16	56	59	44	12th	PR		
2001–02	2. HNL North	30	23	2	5	87	30	71	1st	R1	Danijel Popović	22
2002–03	2. HNL North	32	11	8	13	47	49	41	9th			
2003–04	2. HNL North	32	14	5	13	45	54	47	4th	R1		
2004–05	2. HNL North	32	10	9	13	37	46	39	10th		Krunoslav Đerđ	6
2005–06	2. HNL North	32	13	5	14	41	32	44	6th	R1	Marko Moravčić	9
2006–07	2. HNL	30	9	8	13	40	42	35	9th	R2	Danijel Pavlin	7
2007–08	2. HNL	30	6	6	18	29	53	24	15th ↓		Danijel Spasić	7
2008–09	3. HNL East	33	17	7	9	52	39	58	4th ↑	R1	Danijel Spasić	15
2009–10	2. HNL	26	7	10	9	31	39	31	12th		Danijel Spasić	11
2010–11	2. HNL	30	6	2	22	21	83	20	15th ↓		Ivica Musa, Marin Vrnoga Gregorio	3
2011–12	3. HNL East	15	4	3	8	19	28	15	16th ↓		Nenad Erić	8
