= NK HAŠK =

Croatian football club

NK HAŠK 1903 Zagreb
- Full name: Nogometni Klub Hrvatski Akademski Športski Klub 1903 Zagreb
- Nickname: Akademičari
- Founded: 6 November 1903; 122 years ago as HAŠK, 23 November 1990; 35 years ago as NK HAŠK 1903
- Dissolved: 4 June 1945; 81 years ago
- Ground: Igralište na Donjim Sveticama
- Capacity: 800
- Chairman: Vinko Barišić
- Manager: Ratko Ninković
- League: Treća HNL Centar
- 2022–23: Treća HNL Centar, 13th
| Home colours | Away colours |

NK HAŠK 1903 Zagreb is a Croatian football club from Zagreb that currently competes in the Third Football League – Center (3. NL – Centar). The club plays its home matches at the Donje Svetice ground in the Peščenica district of Zagreb. It was founded on November 23, 1990, as a continuation of the football section of the former HAŠK, which was abolished by decree of the communist authorities on June 4, 1945.

== History ==
=== Early days ===
HAŠK was founded as a multi-sports club in November 1903 by nine Zagreb students (August Adam, Dragutin Albrecht, Petar Čerlek, Vjekoslav Jurković, Marko Kostrenčić, Krešimir Miskić, Oskar Mohr, Lav Wodwarška and Hinko Würth) who are today seen as pioneers of organized sports at the University of Zagreb. The club's purpose was to popularize sports among Croatian students, as well as to counter the ongoing magyarization of Croatian public life, since Croatia was at the time part of the Austro-Hungarian Empire. The club's colours were red, white and golden, chosen to represent the colours of Croatian provinces.

At first, the club had sections for fencing, ice-skating, skiing, sledding and sports shooting, but ever since football was introduced in the spring of 1904, it became the most popular and well-known department of the club. The club played its first official game on 16 October 1906 against PNIŠK Zagreb (Prvi nogometni i športski klub Zagreb, First football and sports club Zagreb) which ended in a 1–1 draw in front of 800 spectators.

The club played many non-league games against local sides and against foreign opponents in the following years, such as the game against BEAC (the University of Budapest sports club) in 1909. When the first Croatian football championship was started in 1912, HAŠK were heading the table in mid-season and were later declared champions as the competition was abandoned after the winter break due to poor organization. The championship was never relaunched, and during World War I the club went on hiatus.

=== Revival and demise ===
In the period from 1918 to 1945 the club grew in popularity and membership, and in the years following the war new sections for track and field athletics, tennis, swimming, field hockey, cycling, table tennis, and motorsport were formed. After experiencing a financial crisis in the 1920s and a fire that destroyed stands on their ground in the summer of 1936, the following decade saw immediate revival and the time of HAŠK's greatest success.

The first success came in 1923 when they won the first edition of the Yugoslav Cup, named back then as the King Alexander Cup. The club will regularly compete in the Yugoslav First League since 1927, and their finest hour came in the 1937–38 season when they won the Yugoslav title. They even went on to compete in the 1938 Mitropa Cup, when they were knocked out in the first round of the tournament by the Czechoslovak side SK Kladno with 5–2 on aggregate. On a local level, in the period from 1911 to 1945 the club played a total of 120 matches against city rivals Građanski. Their last game was a 2–2 draw on 10 April 1945, just before both clubs were disbanded by the communist government.

The newly formed Dinamo Zagreb, which was established by the authorities two months later, took over HAŠK's Maksimir ground (originally opened in May 1912), along with many players who switched from Građanski or HAŠK to Dinamo. Other sports sections of the club were renamed FD Akademičar (Academic Sports Society) and later merged with ASD Mladost (Youth Academic Sports Society) which survives today as the HAŠK Mladost sports society, most famous for their later water polo and volleyball success on both the national and continental levels. The football section of Mladost operated until January 1955.

The most prominent of HAŠK's football players who later joined Dinamo was Zlatko Čajkovski, who spent the next 11 seasons playing for Zagreb's powerhouse. Dinamo's current youth academy and training ground located next to their stadium both bear the name Hitrec-Kacian, in honour of two HAŠK players, Ico Hitrec and Ratko Kacian.

=== Post-Yugoslavia ===
After the fall of communism and in the midst of the breakup of Yugoslavia, the club was reactivated and officially registered in November 1990 by prominent former HAŠK members who had been active as athletes or officials before the forced dissolution of the club took part in these efforts. Initially, no sports activities were launched, as the new club leadership focused on promoting HAŠK’s legacy and organizing events aimed at raising public awareness of HAŠK’s contribution to the development of sports in Croatia.

In an attempt to revive their glory days, the newly restarted club decided to enter competition sports again in 1993 so they merged with a local amateur football side called NK TPK from the Peščenica neighbourhood of Zagreb. In 2006 they merged again with the Druga HNL side NK Naftaš Ivanić from Ivanić Grad to form the present-day NK HAŠK 1903 Zagreb, currently a second tier club in the Croatian football league system. They play their games at the Donje Svetice ground in Zagreb, which has a capacity of 3,000.

== Legacy ==
After the breakup of Yugoslavia and the re-establishment of HAŠK, there were attempts by the political authorities to attribute the histories of the football clubs Građanski and HAŠK to Dinamo. To that end, Dinamo briefly changed its name to HAŠK Građanski. Following a series of conflicts, the newly formed HAŠK was officially recognized as the successor of the football section of the original HAŠK, while HAŠK Građanski (Dinamo) changed its name to Croatia Zagreb, before reverting to Dinamo in February 2000.

On April 12, 2011, NK Dinamo Zagreb further adjusted its name to Građanski nogometni klub Dinamo Zagreb, aiming to emphasize its connection to Građanski.

HAŠK's successors:

- NK HAŠK 1903 (Today's successor of the historic HAŠK football section)
- HAŠK Mladost (Today's successor of HAŠK's other sports sections)

== The football section until 1945. ==
HAŠK players trained in 1903 and 1904 at the then fairground located east of Draškovićeva Street. In 1904, the club received a plot of land in the Western Park (today’s Marulić Square). In 1906, the first public football match in Croatia was held there. Starting in 1905, HAŠK players trained at the Elipsa ground. In 1912, HAŠK built its own pitch, athletics track, and tennis courts in Maksimir (on the site of today’s football stadium).

The club’s official address in 1925 was the Kavana Zagreb.

HAŠK became the champion of the Kingdom of Yugoslavia in the 1937/38 season.

=== Famous players ===
- Vladimir Šuput
- Ivo Lipovšćak
- Eugen Dasović
- Stjepan Šterk
- Ivan Šojat
- Eugen Emil Plazzeriano
- Stjepan Vrbančić
- Mirko Križ
- Hinko Würth
- Ivica Gajer
- Ivica Golac
- Danijel Premerl
- Marko Doranić (Egon Wasserlauf)
- Dragutin Friedrich
- Tomislav Crnković
- Andrija Konc
- Đuka Agić
- Nikola Babić
- Ivan Benković
- Slavin Cindrić
- Ivan Hitrec
- Ratko Kacian
- Ljudevit Vujković Lamić – Moco
- Zlatko Čajkovski
- Željko Čajkovski
- Bruno Knežević
- Ljubo Kokeza
- Franjo Šoštarić

=== Managers ===
- 1913–15: František Koželuh
- 1930: Josef Uridil
- 1932–33: Johann Strnad
- 1937–38: Zoltán Opata
- Rudolf Rupec
- 1943–44: Ratko Kacian

=== Presidents ===
- Hinko Würth (1903)
- Vladimir Rukavina
- Levin Polc
- Branko Arko
- Zvonko Kunz
- Marko Krema
- Branko Domac (1911–1913)
- Hinko Würth (1913–1920)
- Milorad Stražnicky
- Stjepan Miletić Mlinarić
- Marijan Dujmović
- Mato Vene Starčević
- Lovro Celio-Cega
- Vjekoslav Župančić (1943–1945)

=== Club Rivals ===
Throughout its existence, especially in the first half of the 20th century, HAŠK had numerous contemporaries—clubs that developed alongside it and with which it often competed, particularly in Zagreb and the wider Yugoslav region. The most significant among them were:

- Građanski Zagreb – HAŠK’s biggest local rival. Founded in 1911, Građanski was one of the most successful clubs in the Kingdom of Yugoslavia. The club was also disbanded in 1945, and much of its legacy was taken over by the newly formed Dinamo Zagreb.
- Concordia Zagreb – Founded in 1906, Concordia was also one of the important sports clubs in Zagreb during the interwar period. Known for its multicultural spirit and sportsmanship, it was a significant opponent for HAŠK in many encounters.
- Hajduk Split – Founded in 1911, Hajduk remains one of the most important football clubs in Croatia. During the interwar period, it was a major sports rival to many Zagreb-based clubs, including HAŠK.
- Hrvatski tipografski športski klub (HTŠK) – Founded in 1911 by employees of printing houses and typographic workshops, mainly gathered around the then typographic union. The club focused on promoting sports among workers and its identity was strongly connected to the workers' movement, setting it apart from the more bourgeois or academic clubs like HAŠK and Građanski. The club’s successor today is considered NK Zagreb.

== The football club from 1990. and today ==
Although the club also has a senior team competing in the Croatian football league system, NK HAŠK 1903 is primarily known for its work with youth development. The club is recognized for its strong youth academy, and in 2023 it organized a memorial tournament in honor of Krunoslav Faš for under-15 players, attracting major clubs from across the region.

Several well-known Croatian footballers took their first football steps at HAŠK, including Bruno Petković, Mile Škorić, Ivan Fiolić, and Zoran Kvržić.

The senior team currently competes in the Third Football League – Center (3. NL – Centar).

=== Supporters ===
The current football club NK HAŠK 1903 has its own organized supporters group called Indijanci (eng. The Indians).

== Honours ==
=== 1903.-1945. ===
- Croatian First League:

Winners (1): 1912.

- Kingdom of Yugoslavia Champions:

Winners (1): 1937–38

- King Aleksander Cup:

Winners (1): 1923

=== 1990. - today ===
(Croatia) Treća HNL – Center:

- Winners (1): 2003–04
