= NK Lučko =

Croatian football club

- Full name: Nogometni klub Lučko
- Founded: 14 July 1931; 95 years ago
- Ground: Stadion Lučko
- Capacity: 1,500
- Chairman: Petar Plahutar
- Manager: Stjepan Babić
- League: 3. HNL (third level)
- 2025–26: 13th
| Home colours | Away colours |

NK Lučko, commonly referred to as Lučko, is a Croatian football club named after its neighborhood of Lučko, a settlement on the southwest outskirts of capital Zagreb. Originally established in 1931 as "Velebit," it is one of the oldest clubs in the area. After a series of name changes in the following decades, the club finally settled on NK Lučko in February 1962. The club spent most of its existence in lower tiers of Yugoslav and Croatian football pyramid.

Their greatest success to date was playing in the 2011–12 season of Croatian top level, having previously achieved two promotions in only three years. After their relegation, the club returned to playing in lower levels. As of 2025–26 Lučko plays in the Croatia's third division, and host their matches at Stadion Lučko, which has a capacity of 1,500.

== Recent seasons ==
| Season | League | P | W | D | L | F | A | Pts | Pos | Cup | Top goalscorer | Goals |
|---|---|---|---|---|---|---|---|---|---|---|---|---|
| 2006–07 | 3. HNL–West (III) | 34 | 14 | 11 | 9 | 52 | 40 | 53 | 5th | PR | Dragutin Golub; Ivan Galić | 11 |
| 2007–08 | 3. HNL–West (III) | 34 | 16 | 6 | 12 | 56 | 46 | 54 | 4th | — | Domagoj Duspara | 15 |
| 2008–09 | 3. HNL–West (III) | 34 | 19 | 7 | 8 | 75 | 45 | 64 | 2nd ↑ | R1 | Josip Fuček | 27 |
| 2009–10 | 2. HNL (II) | 26 | 12 | 6 | 8 | 38 | 28 | 42 | 4th | — | Josip Fuček | 7 |
| 2010–11 | 2. HNL (II) | 30 | 19 | 2 | 9 | 54 | 28 | 59 | 2nd ↑ | — | Matej Jelić | 14 |
| 2011–12 | 1. HNL (I) | 30 | 6 | 13 | 11 | 29 | 36 | 31 | 13th ↓ | — | Nikola Rak | 6 |
| 2012–13 | 2. HNL (II) | 30 | 12 | 9 | 9 | 31 | 28 | 45 | 9th | — | Željko Sablić | 7 |
| 2013–14 | 2. HNL (II) | 33 | 10 | 11 | 12 | 34 | 36 | 41 | 9th | R2 | Domagoj Abramović | 11 |
| 2014–15 | 2. HNL (II) | 30 | 8 | 9 | 13 | 24 | 35 | 33 | 9th | PR | Ante Aralica | 5 |
| 2015–16 | 2. HNL (II) | 33 | 11 | 7 | 15 | 40 | 47 | 40 | 8th | — | Tomislav Havojić | 6 |
| 2016–17 | 2. HNL (II) | 33 | 9 | 11 | 13 | 34 | 48 | 38 | 9th | — | Robert Janjiš | 5 |
| 2017–18 | 2. HNL (II) | 33 | 8 | 10 | 15 | 27 | 40 | 34 | 10th | — | Borna Petrović | 7 |
| 2018–19 | 2. HNL (II) | 26 | 6 | 6 | 14 | 16 | 31 | 24 | 14th ↓ | — | Nikola Prelčec | 6 |
| 2019–20 | 3. HNL–Center (III) | 17 | 6 | 5 | 6 | 23 | 23 | 23 | 8th | — | | |
| 2020–21 | 3. HNL–Center (III) | 34 | 15 | 5 | 14 | 47 | 42 | 50 | 5th | — | | |
| 2021–22 | 3. HNL–Center (III) | 34 | 18 | 7 | 9 | 65 | 36 | 61 | 5th | — | | |
