= Croatian football league system =

The Croatian football league system is a series of connected leagues for club football in Croatia. This system has hierarchical format with promotion and relegation between leagues at different levels. Last revision of league system was made in 2022:

== Men's league system ==
Update: August 2026

Tier	Leagues						
1	HNL; 10 clubs						
2	Prva NL; 16 clubs						
3	Druga NL; 16 clubs						
4	Treća NL West; 16 clubs	Treća NL Center; 16 clubs	Treća NL North; 16 clubs		Treća NL East; 16 clubs		Treća NL South; 16 clubs
5	Četvrta NL Rijeka; 14 clubs	Četvrta NL Središte Zagreb; 32 clubs (2 groups)	without inter-county league	without inter-county league	MŽNL Osijek-Vinkovci; 16 clubs	MŽNL Brod-Požega; 14 clubs	without inter-county league
6	Elite League of Istria County; 14 clubs First League of Primorje-Gorski Kotar County; 14 clubs League of Lika-Senj County; 7 clubs	First League of Zagreb; 16 clubs Premier League of Zagreb County; 18 clubs First League of Sisak-Moslavina County; 14 clubs First League of Karlovac County; 8 clubs First League of Krapina-Zagorje County; 10 clubs	Premier League of Međimurje County; 14 clubs Elite League of Varaždin County; 12 clubs	First League of Bjelovar-Bilogora County; 14 clubs Elite League of Koprivnica-Križevci County; 14 clubs Premier League of Virovitica-Podravina County; 13 clubs	First league of Osijek-Baranja County; 16 clubs First league of Vukovar-Syrmia County; 16 clubs	First League of Brod-Posavina County; 14 clubs First League of Požega-Slavonia County; 12 clubs	First League of Dubrovnik-Neretva County; 12 clubs First League of Split-Dalmatia County; 14 clubs First League of Šibenik-Knin County; 7 clubs First League of Zadar County; 14 clubs
7	First League of Istria County; 12 clubs Second League of Primorje-Gorski Kotar County; 7 clubs	Second League of Zagreb; 13 clubs Unified First League of Zagreb County; 16 clubs Second League of Sisak-Moslavina County; 22 clubs(2 groups); Second League of Karlovac County; 13 clubs Second League of Krapina-Zagorje County; 10 clubs	First League of Međimurje County; 14 clubs First League of Varaždin County; 12 clubs	Second League of Bjelovar-Bilogora County; 14 clubs First League of Koprivnica-Križevci County; 14 clubs First League of Virovitica-Podravina County; 14 clubs	Second league of Osijek-Baranja County; 71 clubs(6 groups); Second League of Vukovar-Syrmia County; 32 clubs(3 groups)	Second League of Brod-Posavina County; 24 clubs(2 groups); Second League of Požega-Slavonia County; 11 clubs	Second League of Dubrovnik-Neretva County; 9 clubs Second League of Split-Dalmatia County; 10 clubs Second League of Zadar County; 9 clubs
8	Second League of Istria County; 19 clubs(2 groups)	Second League of Zagreb County; 23 clubs(2 groups)	Second League of Međimurje County; 14 clubs Second League of Varaždin County; 14 clubs	Third League of Bjelovar-Bilogora County; 24 clubs(2 groups); Second League of Koprivnica-Križevci County; 14 clubs Second League of Virovitica-Podravina County; 19 clubs(2 groups)	Third League of Osijek-Baranja County; 36 clubs(4 groups); Third League of Vinkovci; 10 clubs Third League of Brod-Posavina County; 22 clubs(2 groups)		Championship of the island of Hvar; 9 clubs
9			Third League of Međimurje County; 16 clubs(2 groups) Third League of Varaždin County; 18 clubs(2 groups)	Third League of Koprivnica-Križevci County; 12 clubs Third League of Virovitica-Podravina County; 14 clubs(2 groups)			

=== Evolution of the Croatian league system ===
Tier\Years	1992–95	1995–97	1997–2006	2006–12	2012–22	2022–present
1	Prva HNL	Prva A HNL	Prva HNL			HNL
2	Druga HNL	Prva B HNL	Druga HNL			Prva NL
3	Treća HNL	Druga HNL	Treća HNL			Druga NL
4	Lower	Treća HNL	Lower	Četvrta HNL	Lower	Treća NL
5	Lower	Lower	Lower	Lower	Lower	Lower
6	Lower	Lower	Lower	Lower	Lower	Lower
7	Lower	Lower	Lower	Lower	Lower	Lower
8	Lower	Lower	Lower	Lower	Lower	Lower

== Women's league system ==
Update: January 2024

Tier	Leagues	
1	Prva HNLŽ; 8 clubs	
2	Druga HNLŽ Group A 8 clubs	Druga HNLŽ Group B 6 clubs

Group A consist of counties in central, south and west Croatia. Group B consist of counties in east and north Croatia.

== Futsal league system ==
Update: January 2024

Tier	Men's leagues		
1	HMNL; 10 clubs		
2	Prva HMNL; 10 clubs		
3	Druga HMNL Center; 8 clubs	Druga HMNL East; 6 clubs	Druga HMNL South; 12 clubs
4	League of Jastrebarsko; 10 clubs		League of Dubrovnik-Neretva County; 11 clubs League of Split-Dalmatia County; 10 clubs League of Šibenik-Knin County; 12 clubs

Prva HMNLŽ (women futsal league) has 8 clubs and at this moment is the only women's futsal league in Croatia.
