= NK Vinogradar =

Croatian football club

Coordinates: 45°42′17.1894″N 15°40′12.8634″E

Vinogradar
- Full name: NK Vinogradar Mladina
- Founded: 1973
- Dissolved: 2021
- Ground: Stadion Mladina
- Capacity: 2,000
- Chairman: Ivan Rubinić
- Manager: Stjepan Gomerac
- League: Treća HNL West
- 2017–18: Treća HNL West, Winners
Home colours	Away colours

NK Vinogradar (English: FC Winemaker) was a former Croatian football club based in the village of Lokošin Dol, part of the town of Jastrebarsko in Zagreb County. The club merged with NK Jaska in 2021 after the death of Ivan Rubinić, the former owner who helped the club become well known as a well-run amateur team in the 2000s and 2010s with a number of cup runs.

== History ==
During the 1960s, people in Jastrebarsko and surrounding villages began to play football more seriously and form the first football clubs. At the beginning of the 1970s, neighborhoods of Jastrebarsko as well the nearby villages began to play football tournaments. After one such tournament the idea was born of establishing NK Vinogradar (English: FC Winemaker). The idea was started by Mladen Božičević, and supported by Francis Fabijanić and Željko Jambrović. The first meeting was held in the spring of 1973 in the premises of the fire brigade in Zdihovo, a village near Jastrebarsko.

The club played in the local city league for most of its existence, taking two years off in 1992 and 1993 for the Croatian War of Independence. Around 1997, Ivan Rubinić, the owner of a successful carpentry company, began financing the club. Under Rubinić the club rose from the county leagues to the Croatian second division where they played an important role between 2007 and 2013. In six seasons in the second division, the club only finished below mid-table once. During its rise, Vinogradar won the county cup in 2003, the year it was promoted to the fourth division.

In June 2013, the club assembly decided to withdraw from Croatian second division due to increased financial requirements and the probable withdrawal of main club sponsor DIR. As a result, the club was relegated to the fifth division.

However, the club achieved back-to-back promotions and for the 2015–16 season again played in the Treća HNL. It won the 2016–17 and 2017-18 Western group, but due to financial disputes with the city of Jastrebarsko, did not apply for promotion to the 2. HNL. It defended its 3.HNL West title again in 2018–19, but again did not apply for a second division license. In 2021, the club merged with nearby NK Jaska Jastrebarsko and the merged club began play in the 5th division.

=== Cup history ===
Vinogradar have reached the quarterfinals of the Croatian Football Cup four times as of 2018, never having advanced past that stage. During the 2010s, Vinogradar consistently qualified for the cup as one of the top 16 teams based on their coefficient. Their first cup appearance was in 2003–04, when they lost in the preliminary round.

The club first made the 2005–06 Croatian Football Cup quarterfinals as a third division side, losing 10–1 to NK Rijeka on aggregate. Vinogradar also reached the quarterfinals of the 2011–12 Croatian Football Cup before losing to HNK Cibalia 3–2 on aggregate.

Most impressively, Vinogradar reached the quarter-finals of the 2014–15 Croatian Football Cup as a fourth division side, beating two higher-placed teams in the process, NK Međimurje from Čakovec and top flight side NK Slaven Belupo. The club then played Hajduk Split in the quarterfinals but lost 6–0 on aggregate. The season before, 2013–14, Vinogradar also played Hajduk Split in the second round of the cup, losing 1–3, but only after extra time.

Vinogradar again made the quarterfinals in 2018 after beating Jadran Ploče 4–2. However they were eliminated after losing 3–0 to Inter Zaprešić.

== Stadium ==
In 1980 the Mladina sports complex opened. It is still home to the club and has undergone modern renovations. The small stadium is in a small valley. The western hill has a motocross track and forest and the other hill has a large vineyard.

The stadium features one covered stand behind the north goal and one uncovered stand to the west. The east and southern parts of the complex are undeveloped.

In 2017, Vinogradar began playing games in the SC Vojarna complex in the center of Jastrebarsko.

Mladina hosted a Wales-Croatia under-19 match in 2018.

== Honours ==
- (Croatia) Treća HNL – West:
  - Winners (4): 2006–07, 2016–17, 2017–18, 2018–19
