= NK Junak Sinj =

Croatian football club

Junak Sinj
- Full name: Nogometni Klub Junak Sinj
- Founded: 18 July 1916; 109 years ago
- Ground: Gradski stadion Sinj
- Capacity: 3,096
- Chairman: Stipe Perić
- Manager: Ivan Medvid
- League: Treća NL
Home colours	Away colours

Nogometni Klub Junak Sinj (Football Club Junak Sinj), commonly referred to as Junak Sinj or just Junak, is a professional Croatian football club based in the town of Sinj, in the southern region of Dalmatia.

They currently compete in the Croatian Third Football League. Junak play their home matches at the 3,096-seated Gradski stadion Sinj (English: Sinj City Stadium).

== History ==
NK Junak Sinj was founded on 18 July 1916. For a brief period between 1922 and 1924 the club was called Velebit. The club was established by university students from Sinj who had been introduced to football in cities such as Split and Zagreb and who decided to form a club in their hometown. The name Junak (English: Hero) was chosen as a reply to Hajduk (English: Outlaw), as in Hajduk Split, the name of the well-known club from the nearby city of Split which had been formed five years earlier. The first President was Ante Brož.

The club's home kit is blue, although they played in black and white kits in the early 20th century as blue cloth was expensive and difficult to come by at the time. Junak played their very first game on 15 August 1916 and the side was captained by Mirko Kačić. After finishing in a low 14th position in the 2017/2018 season the club won first place in the 2018/2019 season.
