= 2011–12 RNK Split season =

RNK Split
2011–12 season
- Chairman: Slaven Žužul
- Manager: Ivan Katalinić (until 14 August 2011); Tonči Bašić (from 14 August 2011)
- Prva HNL: 4th
- Croatian Cup: Second round
- UEFA Europa League: Third qualifying round
- Top goalscorer: League: Duje Čop (8); All: Duje Čop (10)
Home colours	Away colours

The 2011–12 season is the 100th season in RNK Split’s history and their second in the Prva HNL. Their 3rd place finish in the 2010–11 season means it is their 2nd successive season playing in the Prva HNL.

RNK Split finished fourth in the final league standings.

== First-team squad ==
As of 27 February 2012

Note: Flags indicate national team as defined under FIFA eligibility rules; some limited exceptions apply. Players may hold more than one non-FIFA nationality.

No.	Pos.	Nation	Player
1	GK	CRO	Andrija Vuković
2	MF	CRO	Lovro Šindik
4	DF	CRO	Ivica Križanac
5	DF	BIH	Velimir Vidić
6	DF	CRO	Tomislav Glumac
7	MF	CRO	Ante Babić
8	MF	CRO	Ante Vitaić
9	FW	CRO	Ivan Baraban
10	MF	CRO	Ante Erceg
11	FW	CRO	Ante Rebić
12	GK	CRO	Danijel Zagorac
13	DF	CRO	Damir Rašić
14	DF	CRO	Duje Vučemilović-Grgić
16	DF	CRO	Božo Musa

No.	Pos.	Nation	Player
17	MF	CRO	Mate Pehar
18	MF	CRO	Josip Serdarušić
19	FW	CRO	Dražen Jelić
20	MF	CRO	Josip Golubar
21	FW	CRO	Romano Obilinović
24	MF	CRO	Marko Čulić
25	DF	CRO	Filip Marčić
26	MF	CRO	Nino Galović
29	MF	CRO	Marko Tešija
30	GK	CRO	Hrvoje Sunara
32	FW	CRO	Dražen Bagarić
33	MF	BIH	Mirko Hrgović
90	FW	CRO	Duje Čop

== Competitions ==
=== Overall ===
Competition	Started round	Final result	First match	Last Match
2011–12 Prva HNL	–	4th	24 July	12 May
2011–12 Croatian Cup	Preliminary round	Second round	24 August	25 October
2011–12 UEFA Europa League	QR2	QR3	14 July	4 August

=== Prva HNL ===
==== Classification ====
Pos	Team	Pld	W	D	L	GF	GA	GD	Pts	Qualification or relegation
2	Hajduk Split	30	16	6	8	50	24	+26	54	Qualification to Europa League second qualifying round (Note: Since 2011–12 Croatian Cup winners Dinamo Zagreb qualified for the 2012–13 UEFA Champions League, so cup runners-up Osijek qualified for the 2012–13 UEFA Europa League first qualifying round. Moreover, Slaven Belupo were moved up a round as the cup winner spot was not used.)
3	Slaven Belupo	30	14	10	6	41	27	+14	52	Qualification to Europa League second qualifying round
4	RNK Split	30	14	8	8	43	32	+11	50	
5	Cibalia	30	13	6	11	35	35	0	45	
6	NK Zagreb	30	13	6	11	36	42	−6	45	

Source: Sportnet.hr
Rules for classification: 1) points; 2) goal difference; 3) number of goals scored.
For deciding champions, qualification to UEFA Europa League and relegation: 1st points; 2nd head-to-head points; 3rd head-to-head goal difference; 4th head-to-head away goals scored

==== Results summary ====
Overall								Home						Away					
Pld	W	D	L	GF	GA	GD	Pts	W	D	L	GF	GA	GD	W	D	L	GF	GA	GD
30	14	8	8	43	32	+11	50	8	6	1	25	14	+11	6	2	7	18	18	0

Last updated: 12 May 2012.
Source: Sportnet.hr

==== Results by round ====
Round	1	2	3	4	5	6	7	8	9	10	11	12	13	14	15	16	17	18	19	20	21	22	23	24	25	26	27	28	29	30
Ground	A	H	A	H	A	H	A	H	A	H	A	H	A	A	H	H	A	H	A	H	A	H	A	H	A	H	A	H	H	A
Result	L	D	W	D	W	D	W	W	W	W	L	W	W	W	L	D	L	W	L	D	D	D	L	W	L	W	L	W	W	D
Position	12	12	6	10	5	8	6	4	3	3	3	3	3	3	3	3	3	4	3	4	4	4	4	3	4	4	4	4	4	4

Updated to match(es) played on 12 May 2012. Source: Competitive matches
A = Away; H = Home; W = Win; D = Draw; L = Loss
Notes: Round 18 was played between rounds 22 and 23, on 20–21 March 2012

== Matches ==
=== Pre-season ===
Match	Date	Venue	Opponent	Score	Attendance	RNK Split Scorers	Report
1	24 Jun	A (Bosnia and Herzegovina)	Široki Brijeg (Bosnia and Herzegovina)	1 – 4	150	Žužul	Sportnet.hr
2	29 Jun	H	Šibenik	1 – 1	500	Golubović	Sportnet.hr
3	2 Jul	H	GOŠK Gabela (Bosnia and Herzegovina)	5 – 1	300	Erceg, Golubović, Rebić, Ćapin (2)	Sportnet.hr
4	7 Jul	N	Sarajevo (Bosnia and Herzegovina)	1 – 0	200	Vitaić	Sportnet.hr
5	16 Jul	A	Vinjani	5 – 2	500	Obilinović, Ćapin, Rebić (2), Jordan	Sportnet.hr
6	17 Jul	N	Imotski	0 – 1	800		Sportnet.hr

=== Prva HNL ===
Round	Date	Venue	Opponent	Score	Attendance	RNK Split Scorers	Report
1	24 Jul	A	Cibalia	1 – 2	2,000	Marčić	Sportnet.hr
2	31 Jul	H	Slaven Belupo	1 – 1		Obilinović	Sportnet.hr
3	7 Aug	A	Karlovac	3 – 1	1,500	Čop, Vitaić, Rebić	Sportnet.hr
4	14 Aug	H	Osijek	2 – 2	500	Obilinović, Baraban	Sportnet.hr
5	20 Aug	A	Lučko	2 – 1	400	Križanac, Čop	Sportnet.hr
6	28 Aug	H	Hajduk Split	1 – 1	4,500	Obilinović	Sportnet.hr
7	10 Sep	A	Varaždin	2 – 1	1,000	Rebić, Baraban	Sportnet.hr
8	17 Sep	H	Lokomotiva	1 – 0	800	Erceg	Sportnet.hr
9	24 Sep	A	Šibenik	2 – 1	1,000	Ćapin, Golubović	Sportnet.hr
10	1 Oct	H	Zadar	3 – 1	1,000	Obilinović, Šimić, Golubović	Sportnet.hr
11	16 Oct	A	Rijeka	0 – 2	2,000		Sportnet.hr
12	22 Oct	H	Istra 1961	3 – 1	1,000	Obilinović (2), Rebić	Sportnet.hr
13	28 Oct	A	NK Zagreb	2 – 0	1,000	Vitaić, Rebić	Sportnet.hr
14	4 Nov	A	Inter Zaprešić	3 – 0	900	Čop (2), Rebić	Sportnet.hr
15	18 Nov	H	Dinamo Zagreb	0 – 3	3,000		Sportnet.hr
16	26 Nov	H	Cibalia	1 – 1	800	Erceg	Sportnet.hr
17	3 Dec	A	Slaven Belupo	0 – 2	1,500		Sportnet.hr
19	26 Feb	A	Osijek	2 – 3	2,000	Čulić, Jelić	Sportnet.hr
20	3 Mar	H	Lučko	1 – 1	500	Jelić	Sportnet.hr
21	10 Mar	A	Hajduk Split	0 – 0	12,000		Sportnet.hr
22	17 Mar	H	Varaždin	2 – 2	400	Čop, Vidić	Sportnet.hr
18	21 Mar	H	Karlovac	3 – 1	800	Pehar, Čop, Vidić	Sportnet.hr
23	24 Mar	A	Lokomotiva	0 – 1	500		Sportnet.hr
24	31 Mar	H	Šibenik	2 – 0	400	Vidić, Vitaić	Sportnet.hr
25	7 Apr	A	Zadar	1 – 2	2,000	Vitaić	Sportnet.hr
26	14 Apr	H	Rijeka	2 – 0	400	Vitaić, Čop	Sportnet.hr
27	22 Apr	A	Istra 1961	0 – 2	2,500		Sportnet.hr
28	28 Apr	H	NK Zagreb	2 – 0	800	Čop, Bagarić	Sportnet.hr
29	5 May	H	Inter Zaprešić	1 – 0	500	Hrgović	Sportnet.hr
30	12 May	A	Dinamo Zagreb	0 – 0	2,500		Sportnet.hr

=== Europa League ===
Round	Date	Venue	Opponent	Score	Attendance	RNK Split Scorers	Report
QR2	14 Jul	A (Slovenia)	Domžale (Slovenia)	2 – 1	1,000	Čop, Vitaić	Sportnet.hr
QR2	21 Jul	H	Domžale (Slovenia)	3 – 1	3,000	Čop, Vidić, Milović	Sportnet.hr
QR3	28 Jul	H	Fulham (England)	0 – 0	4,000		Sportnet.hr
QR3	4 Aug	A (England)	Fulham (England)	0 – 2			Sportnet.hr

=== Croatian Cup ===
Round	Date	Venue	Opponent	Score	Attendance	RNK Split Scorers	Report
PR	23 Aug	A	Marsonia 1909	2 – 1	1,000	Rebić, Erceg	Sportnet.hr
R1	21 Sep	H	Segesta	5 – 0	500	Rašić (2), Baraban, Tešija, Golubović	Sportnet.hr
R2	25 Oct	A	NK Zagreb	1 – 2	500	Vidić	Sportnet.hr

=== Split-Dalmatia County Cup ===
Round	Date	Venue	Opponent	Score	Attendance	RNK Split Scorers	Report
PR	13 Mar	H	Uskok	1 – 0	150	Bagarić	Sportnet.hr
R2	28 Mar	A	Postira-Sardi	6 – 1		Glumac, Golubar, Jelić (2), Bagarić, Erceg	Sportnet.hr
QF	16 May	H	Solin	1 – 1 (4 – 3 p)		Baraban	Sportnet.hr

=== Mid-season ===
Match	Date	Venue	Opponent	Score	Attendance	Hajduk Scorers	Report
1	17 Jan	H	Solin	2 – 1	300	Babić, Tomaš	Sportnet.hr
2	19 Jan	N (Bosnia and Herzegovina)	Lokomotiva	3 – 1	400	Erceg, Golubar, Serdarušić	Sportnet.hr
3	20 Jan	N (Bosnia and Herzegovina)	Dinamo Zagreb	0 – 0 (4 – 2 p)	400		Sportnet.hr
4	29 Jan	N (Turkey)	AIK Stockholm (Sweden)	1 – 0	50	Čop	Sportnet.hr
5	30 Jan	N (Turkey)	Universitatea Craiova (Romania)	3 – 2		Erceg (2), Rebić	Sportnet.hr
6	31 Jan	N (Turkey)	Tavriya Simferopol (Ukraine)	1 – 0	40	Čop	Sportnet.hr
7	2 Feb	N (Turkey)	Gabala (Azerbaijan)	2 – 2 (3 – 4 p)		Hrgović (2)	Sportnet.hr
8	5 Feb	N (Turkey)	Legia Warsaw (Poland)	2 – 4		Vitaić, Jelić	Sportnet.hr
9	7 Feb	N (Turkey)	Delta Tulcea (Romania)	2 – 1		Obilinović (2)	Sportnet.hr

Sources: Prva-HNL.hr, Sportnet.hr

== Player seasonal records ==
Competitive matches only. Updated to games played 12 May 2012.

=== Top scorers ===
Rank	Name	League	Europe	Cup	Total
1	(Croatia) Duje Čop	8	2	–	10
2	(Croatia) Romano Obilinović	6	–	–	6
2	(Croatia) Ante Rebić	5	–	1	6
2	(Croatia) Ante Vitaić	5	1	–	6
5	(Bosnia and Herzegovina) Velimir Vidić	3	1	1	5
6	(Croatia) Ivan Baraban	2	–	1	3
6	(Bosnia and Herzegovina) Bojan Golubović	2	–	1	3
6	(Croatia) Ante Erceg	2	–	1	3
9	(Croatia) Dražen Jelić	2	–	–	2
9	(Croatia) Damir Rašić	–	–	2	2
11	(Croatia) Dražen Bagarić	–	–	1	1
11	(Croatia) Marko Čulić	1	–	–	1
11	(Croatia) Ante Ćapin	1	–	–	1
11	(Bosnia and Herzegovina) Mirko Hrgović	1	–	–	1
11	(Croatia) Ivica Križanac	1	–	–	1
11	(Croatia) Filip Marčić	1	–	–	1
11	(Croatia) Goran Milović	–	1	–	1
11	(Croatia) Mate Pehar	1	–	–	1
11	(Bosnia and Herzegovina) Predrag Šimić	1	–	–	1
11	(Croatia) Marko Tešija	–	–	1	1
	TOTALS	43	5	8	56

Source: Competitive matches

=== Disciplinary record ===
Includes all competitive matches. Players with 1 card or more included only.

Number	Position	Name	1. HNL		Europa League		Croatian Cup		Total	
Number	Position	Name	Booked	Sent off (straight red)	Booked	Sent off (straight red)	Booked	Sent off (straight red)	Booked	Sent off (straight red)
2	MF	(Croatia) Lovro Šindik	1	0	0	0	0	0	1	0
4	DF	(Croatia) Ivica Križanac	8	1	1	0	0	0	9	1
4	DF	(Croatia) Igor Budiša	6	2	0	0	0	0	6	2
5	DF	(Bosnia and Herzegovina) Velimir Vidić	4	1	1	0	1	0	6	1
6	MF	(Bosnia and Herzegovina) Predrag Šimić	6	1	1	0	0	0	7	1
8	MF	(Croatia) Ante Vitaić	2	1	0	0	0	0	2	1
9	FW	(Croatia) Ivan Baraban	5	0	1	0	0	0	6	0
10	MF	(Croatia) Ante Erceg	6	0	1	0	0	0	7	0
11	FW	(Croatia) Ante Rebić	5	1	1	0	1	0	7	1
13	DF	(Croatia) Damir Rašić	4	0	1	0	0	0	5	0
14	DF	(Croatia) Duje Vučemilović-Grgić	1	0	0	0	0	0	1	0
14	DF	(Croatia) Goran Milović	1	0	0	0	0	0	1	0
17	MF	(Croatia) Mate Pehar	4	0	0	0	0	0	4	0
19	FW	(Croatia) Dražen Jelić	1	0	0	0	0	0	1	0
20	MF	(Croatia) Josip Golubar	1	0	0	0	0	0	1	0
21	FW	(Croatia) Romano Obilinović	3	0	0	0	0	0	3	0
22	FW	(Croatia) Ante Ćapin	1	0	0	0	1	0	2	0
25	DF	(Croatia) Filip Marčić	6	1	2	0	0	0	8	1
26	MF	(Croatia) Nino Galović	1	0	0	0	0	0	1	0
27	MF	(Croatia) Frane Lojić	1	0	0	0	0	0	1	0
32	MF	(Croatia) Dražen Bagarić	2	0	0	0	0	0	2	0
32	FW	(Bosnia and Herzegovina) Bojan Golubović	0	0	1	0	0	0	1	0
33	DF	(Bosnia and Herzegovina) Mirko Hrgović	3	0	0	0	0	0	3	0
90	FW	(Croatia) Duje Čop	3	0	1	0	0	0	4	0
		TOTALS	75	8	11	0	3	0	89	8

Sources: Prva-HNL.hr, UEFA.com

=== Appearances and goals ===
Number	Position	Player	Apps	Goals	Apps	Goals	Apps	Goals	Apps	Goals
Number	Position	Player	Total		1. HNL		Europa League		Croatian Cup	
1	GK	(Croatia) Andrija Vuković	24	0	19+0	0	4+0	0	1+0	0
2	DF	(Croatia) Lovro Šindik	7	0	7+0	0	0+0	0	0+0	0
2	DF	(Croatia) Goran Radnić	8	0	4+2	0	0+0	0	1+1	0
3	DF	(Croatia) Domagoj Franić	1	0	1+0	0	0+0	0	0+0	0
4	DF	(Croatia) Ivica Križanac	25	1	22+0	1	3+0	0	0+0	0
4	DF	(Croatia) Igor Budiša	21	0	13+1	0	4+0	0	3+0	0
5	DF	(Bosnia and Herzegovina) Velimir Vidić	31	5	25+0	3	4+0	1	2+0	1
6	DF	(Croatia) Tomislav Glumac	6	0	4+2	0	0+0	0	0+0	0
6	MF	(Bosnia and Herzegovina) Predrag Šimić	20	1	13+1	1	4+0	0	2+0	0
7	MF	(Croatia) Ante Babić	3	0	2+1	0	0+0	0	0+0	0
8	MF	(Croatia) Ante Vitaić	30	6	21+5	5	4+0	1	0+0	0
9	FW	(Croatia) Ivan Baraban	33	3	14+12	2	4+0	0	2+1	1
10	MF	(Croatia) Ante Erceg	28	3	20+2	2	4+0	0	1+1	1
10	MF	(Croatia) Ante Žužul	3	0	0+1	0	0+0	0	2+0	0
11	FW	(Croatia) Ante Rebić	25	6	13+7	5	0+3	0	2+0	1
12	GK	(Croatia) Danijel Zagorac	13	0	11+0	0	0+0	0	2+0	0
13	DF	(Croatia) Damir Rašić	19	2	8+5	0	0+4	0	1+1	2
14	DF	(Croatia) Duje Vučemilović-Grgić	2	0	1+1	0	0+0	0	0+0	0
14	DF	(Croatia) Goran Milović	7	1	4+0	0	3+0	1	0+0	0
15	MF	(Croatia) Marko Jordan	2	0	1+0	0	0+1	0	0+0	0
16	DF	(Croatia) Božo Musa	2	0	1+1	0	0+0	0	0+0	0
17	FW	(Croatia) Mate Pehar	10	1	6+3	1	0+0	0	1+0	0
19	FW	(Croatia) Dražen Jelić	6	2	4+2	2	0+0	0	0+0	0
19	MF	(Croatia) Frane Lojić	7	0	2+4	0	0+0	0	0+1	0
19	FW	(Croatia) Marko Povrženić	1	0	0+0	0	0+0	0	1+0	0
20	MF	(Croatia) Josip Golubar	11	0	8+3	0	0+0	0	0+0	0
21	FW	(Croatia) Romano Obilinović	27	6	17+7	6	0+2	0	1+0	0
22	FW	(Croatia) Ante Ćapin	11	1	2+6	1	0+0	0	3+0	0
24	MF	(Croatia) Marko Čulić	5	1	5+0	1	0+0	0	0+0	0
25	DF	(Croatia) Filip Marčić	29	1	22+1	1	4+0	0	2+0	0
26	MF	(Croatia) Nino Galović	12	0	5+4	0	0+0	0	3+0	0
27	MF	(Croatia) Hrvoje Barišić	1	0	0+0	0	0+1	0	0+0	0
29	MF	(Croatia) Marko Tešija	11	1	7+2	0	0+0	0	1+1	1
32	MF	(Croatia) Dražen Bagarić	8	1	4+4	1	0+0	0	0+0	0
32	FW	(Bosnia and Herzegovina) Bojan Golubović	21	3	7+8	2	3+0	0	1+2	1
33	MF	(Bosnia and Herzegovina) Mirko Hrgović	13	1	11+2	1	0+0	0	0+0	0
90	FW	(Croatia) Duje Čop	34	10	26+3	8	3+1	2	0+1	0
N/A	MF	(Croatia) Ante Vukušić	1	0	0+0	0	0+0	0	1+0	0

Sources: Prva-HNL.hr, UEFA.com

== Transfers ==
=== In ===
Date	Position	Player	From	Fee
5 June 2011	MF	(Croatia) Marko Jordan	Omiš	Free
9 June 2011	DF	(Croatia) Marko Povrženić	Vinogradar	Free
9 June 2011	FW	(Croatia) Ivan Baraban	Cibalia	Free
28 June 2011	MF	(Croatia) Hrvoje Barišić	Dugopolje	Free
1 July 2011	FW	(Croatia) Duje Čop	Hajduk Split	Free
23 July 2011	MF	(Croatia) Bruno Pralas	GOŠK Dubrovnik	Free
9 January 2012	MF	(Croatia) Ante Babić	Neretvanac	Free

=== Out ===
Date	Position	Player	To	Fee
10 June 2011	DF	(Croatia) Danijel Rašić	–	Released
10 July 2011	MF	(Bosnia and Herzegovina) Sead Bučan	–	Released
15 July 2011	DF	(Croatia) Juraj Grizelj	–	Released
24 July 2011	FW	(Croatia) Joško Parać	Primorac Stobreč	Free

Sources: nogometni-magazin.com
