= 2012–13 RNK Split season =

RNK Split
2012–13 season
- Chairman: Slaven Žužul
- Manager: Tonči Bašić (until 13 October 2012); Zoran Vulić (from 13 October 2012)
- Prva HNL: 5th
- Croatian Cup: Second round
- Top goalscorer: League: Ante Vitaić (6); All: Ante Rebić, Ante Vitaić (7)

This article shows statistics of individual players for the RNK Split football club. It also lists all matches that RNK Split played in the 2012–13 season.

RNK Split finished fifth in the final league standings.

== First-team squad ==
As of 5 September 2012

Note: Flags indicate national team as defined under FIFA eligibility rules; some limited exceptions apply. Players may hold more than one non-FIFA nationality.

No.	Pos.	Nation	Player
1	GK	CRO	Andrija Vuković
3	DF	CRO	Denis Glavina
4	DF	CRO	Ivica Križanac
5	DF	BIH	Velimir Vidić
6	DF	CRO	Tomislav Glumac
7	MF	CRO	Ante Babić
8	MF	CRO	Ante Vitaić
9	FW	CRO	Ivan Baraban
10	MF	CRO	Ante Erceg
11	FW	CRO	Ante Rebić
12	GK	CRO	Danijel Zagorac
13	DF	CRO	Damir Rašić
14	DF	CRO	Duje Vučemilović-Grgić
15	MF	CRO	Mario Kvesić
16	DF	CRO	Tomislav Radotić

No.	Pos.	Nation	Player
17	MF	CRO	Mate Pehar
18	MF	CRO	Josip Serdarušić
19	FW	CRO	Dražen Jelić
20	DF	BIH	Ivan Radeljić
22	FW	CRO	Aljoša Vojnović
23	MF	CRO	Goran Paracki
24	MF	BIH	Muris Pirić
25	DF	CRO	Filip Marčić
26	MF	CRO	Nino Galović
30	GK	CRO	Hrvoje Sunara
32	FW	CRO	Dražen Bagarić
33	MF	BIH	Mirko Hrgović
34	FW	CMR	Henri Belle
—	DF	CRO	Matej Petrović
—	FW	CAN	Taj Sangara

== Competitions ==
=== Prva HNL ===
==== Classification ====
Pos	Team	Pld	W	D	L	GF	GA	GD	Pts	Qualification or relegation
3	Rijeka	33	15	8	10	46	42	+4	53	Qualification to Europa League second qualifying round (Note: Hajduk Split qualify for 2013–14 Europa League Second qualifying round as winners of 2012–13 Croatian Cup.)
4	Hajduk Split	33	14	10	9	45	31	+14	52	Qualification to Europa League second qualifying round
5	RNK Split	33	15	7	11	49	37	+12	52	
6	Istra 1961	33	11	11	11	35	32	+3	44	
7	Osijek	33	9	12	12	25	33	−8	39	

Source: Sportnet.hr
Rules for classification: 1) points; 2) goal difference; 3) number of goals scored.
For deciding champions, qualification to UEFA Europa League and relegation: 1st points; 2nd head-to-head points; 3rd head-to-head goal difference; 4th head-to-head away goals scored

==== Results summary ====
Overall								Home						Away					
Pld	W	D	L	GF	GA	GD	Pts	W	D	L	GF	GA	GD	W	D	L	GF	GA	GD
22	10	4	8	33	27	+6	34	8	2	1	18	7	+11	2	2	7	15	20	−5

Last updated: 1 March 2013.
Source: Sportnet.hr

==== Results by round ====
Round	1	2	3	4	5	6	7	8	9	10	11	12	13	14	15	16	17	18	19	20	21	22	23	24	25	26	27	28	29	30	31	32	33
Ground	H	A	H	A	H	A	H	H	A	H	A	A	H	A	H	A	H	A	A	H	A	H											
Result	W	L	W	L	W	L	W	W	L	D	D	W	L	D	W	L	W	W	L	W	L	D											
Position	3	6	5	6	6	7	3	3	4	4	7	4	6	7	4	6	5	4	6	4	4	4											

Updated to match(es) played on 1 March 2013. Source: Competitive matches
A = Away; H = Home; W = Win; D = Draw; L = Loss

== Matches ==
=== Prva HNL ===
Round	Date	Venue	Opponent	Score	Attendance	RNK Split Scorers	Report
1	20 Jul	H	Rijeka	2 – 0	2,000	Vojnović, Baraban	Sportnet.hr
2	29 Jul	A	Hajduk Split	0 – 1	12,000		Sportnet.hr
3	5 Aug	H	Slaven Belupo	2 – 0	800	Vitaić, Baraban	Sportnet.hr
4	12 Aug	A	Dinamo Zagreb	2 – 4	3,000	Belle, Bagarić	Sportnet.hr
5	18 Aug	H	Cibalia	3 – 1	500	Vitaić (2), Pehar	Sportnet.hr
6	25 Aug	A	Istra 1961	0 – 1	2,000		Sportnet.hr
7	1 Sep	H	Inter Zaprešić	1 – 0	200	Pehar	Sportnet.hr
8	15 Sep	H	Zadar	3 – 1	500	Erceg, Pehar, Vitaić	Sportnet.hr
9	21 Sep	A	NK Zagreb	1 – 2	1,500	Vojnović	Sportnet.hr
10	30 Sep	H	Lokomotiva	1 – 1	500	Kvesić	Sportnet.hr
11	6 Oct	A	Osijek	2 – 2	1,500	Vitaić, Rebić	Sportnet.hr
12	20 Oct	A	Rijeka	3 – 2	6,000	Rebić, Vitaić, Glumac	Sportnet.hr
13	28 Oct	H	Hajduk Split	0 – 1	4,000		Sportnet.hr
14	3 Nov	A	Slaven Belupo	2 – 2	1,500	Vojnović, Rebić	Sportnet.hr
15	10 Nov	H	Dinamo Zagreb	1 – 0	2,000	Rebić	Sportnet.hr
16	17 Nov	A	Cibalia	1 – 2	1,000	Baraban	Sportnet.hr
17	24 Nov	H	Istra 1961	2 – 1	600	Belle, Radeljić	Sportnet.hr
18	30 Nov	A	Inter Zaprešić	2 – 0	300	Rebić, Belle	Sportnet.hr
19	8 Dec	A	Zadar	0 – 1	400		Sportnet.hr
20	15 Feb	H	NK Zagreb	3 – 2	800	Belle (2), Vojnović	Sportnet.hr
21	22 Feb	A	Lokomotiva	2 – 3	200	Križanac (2)	Sportnet.hr
22	1 Mar	H	Osijek	0 – 0	600		Sportnet.hr
23	9 Mar	H	NK Zagreb	4 – 1	250	Rebić (2), Belle, Erceg	Sportnet.hr
24	15 Mar	A	Inter Zaprešić	0 – 0	400		Sportnet.hr
25	30 Mar	H	Cibalia	1 – 0	400	Erceg	Sportnet.hr
26	6 Apr	A	Slaven Belupo	0 – 0	650		Sportnet.hr
27	13 Apr	H	Rijeka	3 – 1	1000	Rebić, Barišić, Erceg	Sportnet.hr
28	20 Apr	H	Osijek	4 – 1	600	Rebić, Glumac, Baraban, Erceg	Sportnet.hr
29	27 Apr	A	Lokomotiva	0 – 1	1200		Sportnet.hr
30	4 May	H	Hajduk Split	2 – 1	1500	Erceg (2)	Sportnet.hr
31	11 May	A	Dinamo Zagreb	0 – 2	1000		Sportnet.hr
32	18 May	H	Istra 1961	0 – 1	400		Sportnet.hr
33	26 May	A	Zadar	2 – 2	1500	Belle, Rebić	Sportnet.hr

=== Croatian Cup ===
Round	Date	Venue	Opponent	Score	Attendance	RNK Split Scorers	Report
PR	29 Aug	A	Virovitica	4 – 1	500	Vojnović, Jelić (2), Rebić	Sportnet.hr
R1	26 Sep	H	Zagora Unešić	5 – 1	500	Vojnović, Vitaić, Erceg (2), Jelić	Sportnet.hr
R2	31 Oct	A	Hajduk Split	1 – 2	6,000	Rebić	Sportnet.hr

=== Split-Dalmatia County Cup ===
Round	Date	Venue	Opponent	Score	Attendance	RNK Split Scorers	Report
R1	26 Feb	HR	Orkan	0 – 0 (4 – 2 p)			Sportnet.hr
R2	6 Mar	A	Mračaj	0 – 0 (5 – 4 p)			Sportnet.hr
QF	17 Apr	A	Hrvace	–			

Sources: Prva-HNL.hr

== Player seasonal records ==
Competitive matches only. Updated to games played 30 November 2012.

=== Top scorers ===
Rank	Name	League	Cup	Total
1	(Croatia) Ante Rebić	5	2	7
1	(Croatia) Ante Vitaić	6	1	7
3	(Croatia) Aljoša Vojnović	3	2	5
4	(Croatia) Ivan Baraban	3	–	3
4	(Cameroon) Henri Belle	3	–	3
4	(Croatia) Ante Erceg	1	2	3
4	(Croatia) Dražen Jelić	–	3	3
4	(Croatia) Mate Pehar	3	–	3
9	(Croatia) Dražen Bagarić	1	–	1
9	(Croatia) Tomislav Glumac	1	–	1
9	(Croatia) Mario Kvesić	1	–	1
9	(Bosnia and Herzegovina) Ivan Radeljić	1	–	1
	TOTALS	28	10	38

Source: Competitive matches

=== Appearances and goals ===
Number	Position	Player	Apps	Goals	Apps	Goals	Apps	Goals
Number	Position	Player	Total		1. HNL		Croatian Cup	
1	GK	(Croatia) Andrija Vuković	14	0	13+0	0	1+0	0
3	DF	(Croatia) Denis Glavina	3	0	2+0	0	1+0	0
4	DF	(Croatia) Ivica Križanac	4	0	3+0	0	1+0	0
5	DF	(Bosnia and Herzegovina) Velimir Vidić	9	0	9+0	0	0+0	0
6	DF	(Croatia) Tomislav Glumac	8	1	4+3	1	1+0	0
8	MF	(Croatia) Ante Vitaić	18	7	15+0	6	3+0	1
9	FW	(Croatia) Ivan Baraban	18	3	7+10	3	0+1	0
10	MF	(Croatia) Ante Erceg	17	3	5+9	1	3+0	2
11	FW	(Croatia) Ante Rebić	19	7	13+4	5	0+2	2
12	GK	(Croatia) Danijel Zagorac	7	0	5+0	0	2+0	0
13	DF	(Croatia) Damir Rašić	3	0	0+1	0	1+1	0
14	DF	(Croatia) Duje Vučemilović-Grgić	1	0	0+0	0	1+0	0
15	MF	(Croatia) Mario Kvesić	7	1	1+3	1	1+2	0
16	DF	(Croatia) Tomislav Radotić	16	0	15+0	0	1+0	0
17	MF	(Croatia) Mate Pehar	12	3	12+0	3	0+0	0
19	FW	(Croatia) Dražen Jelić	8	3	0+6	0	1+1	3
20	DF	(Bosnia and Herzegovina) Ivan Radeljić	11	1	5+4	1	2+0	0
21	FW	(Croatia) Romano Obilinović	1	0	0+1	0	0+0	0
22	FW	(Croatia) Aljoša Vojnović	20	5	16+1	3	3+0	2
23	MF	(Croatia) Goran Paracki	18	0	14+1	0	2+1	0
24	MF	(Bosnia and Herzegovina) Muris Pirić	1	0	0+0	0	0+1	0
25	DF	(Croatia) Filip Marčić	12	0	8+3	0	1+0	0
26	MF	(Croatia) Nino Galović	19	0	15+1	0	3+0	0
29	MF	(Croatia) Marko Tešija	1	0	0+0	0	1+0	0
32	MF	(Croatia) Dražen Bagarić	9	1	4+5	1	0+0	0
33	DF	(Bosnia and Herzegovina) Mirko Hrgović	17	0	17+0	0	0+0	0
34	MF	(Cameroon) Henri Belle	20	3	15+2	3	3+0	0

Sources: Prva-HNL.hr
