= 2010–11 RNK Split season =

RNK Split
2010–11 season
- Chairman: Slaven Žužul
- Manager: Ivan Katalinić
- Stadium: Park mladeži
- Prva HNL: 3rd
- Top goalscorer: Bojan Golubović (6)
- Highest home attendance: 6,000 (vs Hajduk Split, 29 August 2010)
- Lowest home attendance: 800 (vs Šibenik, 23 April 2011)
Home colours	Away colours

The 2010–11 season was the 99th season in RNK Split's history, their first in the Prva HNL and 20th in the league system of Croatian football. Their 1st-place finish in the 2009–10 season marked their return to top flight after 49 years, having been relegated from the 1960–61 Yugoslav First League. It was also Ivan Katalinić's first season as manager of RNK Split, after he was appointed following the removal of Tonči Bašić in June 2010.

Bašić made the most of his new signings following the end of the previous season, including Romano Obilinović, Igor Budiša and Velimir Vidić. The season started with an away defeat to Rijeka, which was followed by their first win in Prva HNL, a 4–0 victory over Varaždin at Park mladeži. After a seven-match unbeaten run propelled RNK Split to the third place, they suffered a decline in form and recorded only one win in eight matches. During the mid-season club signed Filip Marčić and Ivica Križanac on a free transfer. After the winter break, they lost only twice in the remaining 12 matches, against Hajduk Split and Osijek. RNK Split finished the season in 3rd place and qualified for the 2011–12 UEFA Europa League.

The club reached the final of the Split-Dalmatia County Cup, where the team defeated Dugopolje 5–4 in the penalty shootout after the match ended 1–1. This feat ensured them a place in the preliminary round of the Croatian Cup in the next season. Bojan Golubović was the club's top goalscorer after scoring 6 goals.

== First-team squad ==
As of 2 February 2011

Note: Flags indicate national team as defined under FIFA eligibility rules; some limited exceptions apply. Players may hold more than one non-FIFA nationality.

No.	Pos.	Nation	Player
1	GK	CRO	Andrija Vuković
2	DF	CRO	Goran Radnić
4	MF	CRO	Igor Budiša
5	DF	BIH	Velimir Vidić
6	MF	BIH	Predrag Šimić
7	MF	CRO	Juraj Grizelj
8	MF	CRO	Ante Vitaić
9	FW	CRO	Joško Parać
10	MF	CRO	Ante Žužul
12	GK	CRO	Danijel Zagorac
13	DF	CRO	Damir Rašić
14	DF	CRO	Goran Milović
16	MF	CRO	Frane Lojić

No.	Pos.	Nation	Player
17	MF	CRO	Mate Pehar
18	MF	CRO	Josip Serdarušić
20	MF	BIH	Sead Bučan
21	FW	CRO	Romano Obilinović
22	FW	CRO	Ante Ćapin
23	DF	CRO	Danijel Rašić
24	MF	CRO	Ante Erceg
25	DF	CRO	Filip Marčić
30	GK	CRO	Tomislav Duka
32	FW	BIH	Bojan Golubović
44	DF	CRO	Ivica Križanac
45	MF	CRO	Ante Serdarušić

== Competitions ==
=== Overall ===
Competition	Started round	Final result	First match	Last Match
2010–11 Prva HNL	–	3rd	24 July	21 May
2011 Split-Dalmatia County Cup	Second round	Winners	16 February	24 May

=== Prva HNL ===
==== Classification ====
Pos	Team	Pld	W	D	L	GF	GA	GD	Pts	Qualification or relegation
1	Dinamo Zagreb (C)	30	22	6	2	52	12	+40	72	Qualification to Champions League second qualifying round
2	Hajduk Split	30	16	7	7	54	32	+22	55	Qualification to Europa League third qualifying round
3	RNK Split	30	16	5	9	38	22	+16	53	Qualification to Europa League second qualifying round
4	Cibalia	30	12	8	10	33	24	+9	44	
5	Inter Zaprešić	30	12	6	12	31	35	−4	42	

Source: Prva-HNL.hr
Rules for classification: 1) points; 2) goal difference; 3) number of goals scored.
For deciding champions, qualification to UEFA Europa League and relegation: 1st points; 2nd head-to-head points; 3rd head-to-head goal difference; 4th head-to-head away goals scored
(C) Champions

==== Results summary ====
Overall								Home						Away					
Pld	W	D	L	GF	GA	GD	Pts	W	D	L	GF	GA	GD	W	D	L	GF	GA	GD
30	16	5	9	38	22	+16	53	10	2	3	24	10	+14	6	3	6	14	12	+2

Last updated: 21 May 2011.
Source: Sportnet.hr

==== Results by round ====
Round	1	2	3	4	5	6	7	8	9	10	11	12	13	14	15	16	17	18	19	20	21	22	23	24	25	26	27	28	29	30
Ground	A	H	A	H	A	H	A	H	A	H	A	H	A	A	H	H	A	H	A	H	A	H	A	H	A	H	A	H	H	A
Result	L	W	L	W	W	D	W	W	W	W	L	D	L	W	L	L	D	L	W	W	L	W	D	W	L	W	W	W	W	D
Position	10	6	10	8	5	6	4	3	3	3	3	3	4	4	4	4	4	5	4	3	3	3	3	3	4	3	3	3	3	3

Source: Competitive matches
A = Away; H = Home; W = Win; D = Draw; L = Loss

==== Results by opponent ====
Team	Results		Points
Team	Home	Away	Points
Cibalia	2–1	1–0	6
Dinamo Zagreb	0–1	1–1	1
Hajduk Split	1–1	1–3	1
Hrvatski Dragovoljac	1–0	4–0	6
Inter Zaprešić	1–1	2–0	4
Istra 1961	2–0	1–0	6
Karlovac	0–1	0–1	0
Lokomotiva	1–0	0–0	4
Osijek	1–0	0–1	3
Rijeka	2–3	0–1	0
Šibenik	1–0	0–3	3
Slaven Belupo	3–0	2–1	6
Varaždin	4–0	0–0	4
Zadar	3–2	0–1	3
NK Zagreb	2–0	2–0	6

Source: 2010–11 Prva HNL article

== Matches ==
=== Pre-season ===
Match	Date	Venue	Opponent	Score	RNK Split Scorers	Report
1	25 Jun	H	Zadar	2–0	Deranja, Parać	Sportnet.hr
2	30 Jun	A (Austria)	GAK (Austria)	4–1	A. Vitaić, Grizelj, Tešija (2)	Sportnet.hr
3	3 Jul	N (Slovenia)	Hrvatski Dragovoljac	0–2		Sportnet.hr
4	6 Jul	A (Slovenia)	Aluminij (Slovenia)	2–0	F. Vitaić, Žužul	Sportnet.hr
5	7 Jul	N (Slovenia)	Sportul Studenţesc (Romania)	1–1	Golubović	Sportnet.hr
6	11 Jul	H	Široki Brijeg (Bosnia and Herzegovina)	1–1	Qerimi	Sportnet.hr
7	16 Jul	A	Vinjani	4–1	Pe. Šimić, Parać (2), Žužul	Sportnet.hr
8	18 Jul	N	Imotski	4–2	A. Vitaić, Radnić, Parać, Grizelj	Sportnet.hr

=== Prva HNL ===
Round	Date	Venue	Opponent	Score	Attendance	RNK Split Scorers	Report
1	24 Jul	A	Rijeka	0–1	2,000		Sportnet.hr
2	31 Jul	H	Varaždin	4–0	4,000	Žužul, Bučan (2), Obilinović	Sportnet.hr
3	7 Aug	A	Karlovac	0–1	1,500		Sportnet.hr
4	14 Aug	H	Slaven Belupo	3–0	2,500	Obilinović, J. Serdarušić, Golubović	Sportnet.hr
5	21 Aug	A	Cibalia	1–0	1,000	J. Serdarušić	Sportnet.hr
6	29 Aug	H	Hajduk Split	1–1	6,000	Golubović	Sportnet.hr
7	10 Sep	A	NK Zagreb	2–0	1,000	Pr. Šimić, A. Vitaić	Sportnet.hr
8	18 Sep	H	Lokomotiva	1–0	1,100	A. Vitaić	Sportnet.hr
9	25 Sep	A	Istra 1961	1–0	1,200	Milović	Sportnet.hr
10	2 Oct	H	Osijek	1–0	1,800	Golubović	Sportnet.hr
11	16 Oct	A	Šibenik	0–3	1,500		Sportnet.hr
12	23 Oct	H	Inter Zaprešić	1–1	1,000	Vidić	Sportnet.hr
13	30 Oct	A	Zadar	0–1	1,500		Sportnet.hr
14	6 Nov	A	Hrvatski Dragovoljac	4–0	500	J. Serdarušić (2), Radnić, Parać	Sportnet.hr
15	13 Nov	H	Dinamo Zagreb	0–1	4,000		Sportnet.hr
16	20 Nov	H	Rijeka	2–3	1,000	Obilinović, Parać	Sportnet.hr
17	28 Nov	A	Varaždin	0–0	500		Sportnet.hr
18	4 Dec	H	Karlovac	0–1	1,000		Sportnet.hr
19	26 Feb	A	Slaven Belupo	2–1	1,500	Golubović, Bučan	Sportnet.hr
20	5 Mar	H	Cibalia	2–1	1,500	Golubović (2)	Sportnet.hr
21	12 Mar	A	Hajduk Split	1–3	8,000	Vejić (o.g.)	Sportnet.hr
22	19 Mar	H	NK Zagreb	2–0	1,000	Budiša, Dam. Rašić	Sportnet.hr
23	1 Apr	A	Lokomotiva	0–0	500		Sportnet.hr
24	9 Apr	H	Istra 1961	2–0	1,000	A. Vitaić, Križanac	Sportnet.hr
25	16 Apr	A	Osijek	0–1	1,500		Sportnet.hr
26	23 Apr	H	Šibenik	1–0	800	A. Vitaić	Sportnet.hr
27	30 Apr	A	Inter Zaprešić	2–0	2,200	A. Vitaić, J. Serdarušić	Sportnet.hr
28	7 May	H	Zadar	3–2	1,000	Vidić, Pr. Šimić, Dam. Rašić	Sportnet.hr
29	14 May	H	Hrvatski Dragovoljac	1–0	1,000	Erceg	Sportnet.hr
30	21 May	A	Dinamo Zagreb	1–1	3,000	Rebić	Sportnet.hr

=== Split-Dalmatia County Cup ===
Round	Date	Venue	Opponent	Score	Attendance	RNK Split Scorers	Report
R2	16 Feb	H	Primorac 1929	4–0	100	Golubović, Ćapin (2), J. Serdarušić	Sportnet.hr
QF	15 Mar	A	OSK Otok	2–0	500	Parać, Erceg	rnksplit.hr
SF	10 May	A	Imotski	3–1	400	Obilinović, Ćapin (2)	Sportnet.hr
Final	24 May	A	Dugopolje	1–1 (5–4 p)	700	Ćapin	Sportnet.hr

Last updated 24 May 2011
Sources: Prva-HNL.hr, Sportnet.hr

== Player seasonal records ==
Competitive matches only. Updated to games played 21 May 2011.

=== Goalscorers ===
Rank	Name	League
1	(Bosnia and Herzegovina) Bojan Golubović	6
2	(Croatia) Josip Serdarušić	5
2	(Croatia) Ante Vitaić	5
4	(Bosnia and Herzegovina) Sead Bučan	3
4	(Croatia) Romano Obilinović	3
6	(Croatia) Joško Parać	2
6	(Croatia) Damir Rašić	2
6	(Bosnia and Herzegovina) Predrag Šimić	2
6	(Bosnia and Herzegovina) Velimir Vidić	2
10	(Croatia) Igor Budiša	1
10	(Croatia) Ante Erceg	1
10	(Croatia) Ivica Križanac	1
10	(Croatia) Goran Milović	1
10	(Croatia) Goran Radnić	1
10	(Croatia) Ante Rebić	1
10	(Croatia) Ante Žužul	1
	Own goals	1
	TOTAL	38

Source: Competitive matches

=== Squad statistics ===
Number	Position	Player	League		Discipline	
Number	Position	Player	Apps	Goals	Yellow card	Red card
1	GK	(Croatia) Andrija Vuković	30	0	2	0
2	DF	(Croatia) Goran Radnić	17	1	5	0
3	DF	(Croatia) Ivica Pirić	4	0	2	0
4	MF	(Bosnia and Herzegovina) Igor Budiša	27	1	7	0
5	DF	(Bosnia and Herzegovina) Velimir Vidić	25	2	4	0
6	MF	(Bosnia and Herzegovina) Predrag Šimić	25	2	9	0
7	MF	(Croatia) Juraj Grizelj	18	0	1	0
8	MF	(Croatia) Ante Vitaić	26	5	4	0
9	FW	(Croatia) Joško Parać	7	2	0	0
10	MF	(Croatia) Ante Žužul	8	1	1	0
11	FW	(Croatia) Zvonimir Deranja	8	0	0	0
11	FW	(Croatia) Ante Rebić	1	1	0	0
13	DF	(Croatia) Damir Rašić	15	2	2	0
14	DF	(Croatia) Goran Milović	20	1	3	0
15	DF	(Croatia) Petar Šimić	5	0	0	0
16	MF	(Croatia) Frane Lojić	18	0	4	0
17	MF	(Croatia) Mate Pehar	18	0	9	1
18	MF	(Croatia) Josip Serdarušić	24	5	3	0
20	MF	(Croatia) Sead Bučan	26	3	4	0
21	FW	(Croatia) Romano Obilinović	28	3	3	0
22	FW	(Croatia) Ante Ćapin	3	0	0	0
22	FW	(Finland) Shpat Qerimi	1	0	0	0
24	MF	(Croatia) Ante Erceg	11	1	1	0
25	DF	(Croatia) Filip Marčić	12	0	0	0
29	MF	(Croatia) Marko Tešija	2	0	0	0
32	FW	(Bosnia and Herzegovina) Bojan Golubović	29	6	1	1
44	DF	(Croatia) Ivica Križanac	11	1	3	0

Sources: Prva-HNL.hr, rnksplit.hr

== Transfers ==
=== In ===
Date	Position	Player	From	Fee
3 June 2010	DF	(Bosnia and Herzegovina) Velimir Vidić	Šibenik	Free
3 June 2010	DF	(Bosnia and Herzegovina) Igor Budiša	Šibenik	Free
8 June 2010	FW	(Croatia) Zvonimir Deranja	R.E. Mouscron	Free
8 June 2010	MF	(Bosnia and Herzegovina) Predrag Šimić	Željezničar Sarajevo	Free
8 June 2010	MF	(Bosnia and Herzegovina) Sead Bučan	Željezničar Sarajevo	Free
8 June 2010	FW	(Croatia) Romano Obilinović	Imotski	Free
8 June 2010	DF	(Croatia) Danijel Rašić	Imotski	Free
25 June 2010	FW	(Bosnia and Herzegovina) Bojan Golubović	Međimurje	Undisclosed
20 July 2010	FW	(Finland) Shpat Qerimi	Eintracht Norderstedt	Free
23 August 2010	MF	(Croatia) Mate Pehar	Neretva	Free
12 January 2011	DF	(Croatia) Filip Marčić	Slaven Belupo	Free
27 January 2011	DF	(Croatia) Ivica Križanac	Zenit St. Petersburg	Free
5 February 2011	MF	(Croatia) Ante Serdarušić	–	Free

=== Out ===
Date	Position	Player	To	Fee
8 September 2010	MF	(Croatia) Frane Vitaić	Cibalia	Free
13 October 2010	DF	(Croatia) Ivica Pirić	–	Retired
25 December 2010	MF	(Croatia) Goran Gruica	Zestaponi	Free
22 January 2011	FW	(Croatia) Dalibor Mandarić	Imotski	Free
27 January 2011	FW	(Finland) Shpat Qerimi	–	Released
1 February 2011	FW	(Croatia) Zvonimir Deranja	–	Released
1 February 2011	DF	(Croatia) Petar Šimić	Solin	Free

=== Loans out ===
Date	Position	Player	To	Until
14 July 2010	FW	(Croatia) Dalibor Mandarić	Imotski	4 January 2011
19 July 2010	DF	(Croatia) Branimir Borozan	Solin	End of season
19 July 2010	FW	(Croatia) Tomislav Miljak	Solin	End of season
19 July 2010	MF	(Croatia) Ivan Muslim	Dugopolje	15 December 2010
23 August 2010	FW	(Croatia) Ante Ćapin	Imotski	4 January 2011
17 January 2011	MF	(Croatia) Ivan Muslim	Solin	End of season

Sources: nogometni-magazin.com
