= Dražen Bagarić =

Croatian footballer (born 1992)

Personal information
- Date of birth: 12 November 1992 (age 34)
- Place of birth: Vienna, Austria
- Height: 1.93 m (6 ft 4 in)
- Position: Centre-forward

Team information
- Current team: Dugopolje
- Number: 11

Youth career
- 2002–2009: Dinara
- 2010–2011: Rijeka

Senior career*
| Years | Team | Apps | (Gls) |
| 2011–2012 | Dinara | 16 | (7) |
| 2012–2016 | RNK Split | 96 | (15) |
| 2013 | → Dugopolje (loan) | 17 | (3) |
| 2016–2017 | Ashdod | 12 | (1) |
| 2017–2018 | Shakhtyor Soligorsk | 19 | (2) |
| 2018–2020 | Široki Brijeg | 57 | (20) |
| 2020–2021 | Olimpija Ljubljana | 6 | (0) |
| 2021 | Hermannstadt | 17 | (2) |
| 2021–2022 | Sarajevo | 29 | (4) |
| 2022 | Honka | 13 | (3) |
| 2023 | Kolubara | 16 | (0) |
| 2023– | Dugopolje | 43 | (7) |

International career
| 2014 | Croatia U21 | 4 | (1) |
- * Club domestic league appearances and goals as of 27 November 2024

Dražen Bagarić (born 12 November 1992) is a Croatian professional footballer who plays as a centre-forward for Dugopolje.

== Club career ==
On 13 July 2022, Bagarić signed with Honka in Finland.

== Career statistics ==
=== Club ===
As of 27 November 2024

Appearances and goals by club, season and competition
| Club | Season | League | | | Cup | | Continental | | Total | |
| Club | Season | Division | Apps | Goals | Apps | Goals | Apps | Goals | Apps | Goals |
|---|---|---|---|---|---|---|---|---|---|---|
| Dinara | 2011–12 | Treća NL | 16 | 7 | — | | — | | 16 | 7 |
| RNK Split | 2011–12 | 1. HNL | 7 | 1 | 0 | 0 | — | | 7 | 1 |
| RNK Split | 2012–13 | 1. HNL | 15 | 1 | 0 | 0 | — | | 15 | 1 |
| RNK Split | 2013–14 | 1. HNL | 10 | 1 | 0 | 0 | — | | 10 | 1 |
| RNK Split | 2014–15 | 1. HNL | 31 | 4 | 5 | 2 | 8 | 0 | 44 | 6 |
| RNK Split | 2015–16 | 1. HNL | 30 | 8 | 0 | 0 | — | | 30 | 8 |
| RNK Split | 2016–17 | 1. HNL | 3 | 0 | 0 | 0 | — | | 3 | 0 |
| RNK Split | Total | | 96 | 15 | 5 | 2 | 8 | 0 | 109 | 17 |
| Dugopolje (loan) | 2013–14 | Druga NL | 17 | 3 | 0 | 0 | — | | 17 | 3 |
| Ashdod | 2016–17 | Israeli Premier League | 12 | 1 | 6 | 0 | — | | 18 | 1 |
| Shakhtyor Soligorsk | 2017 | Belarusian Premier League | 19 | 2 | 6 | 2 | 2 | 0 | 27 | 4 |
| Široki Brijeg | 2017–18 | Bosnian Premier League | 12 | 7 | — | | — | | 12 | 7 |
| Široki Brijeg | 2018–19 | Bosnian Premier League | 27 | 7 | 7 | 4 | 2 | 0 | 36 | 11 |
| Široki Brijeg | 2019–20 | Bosnian Premier League | 18 | 6 | 2 | 0 | 2 | 1 | 22 | 7 |
| Široki Brijeg | Total | | 57 | 20 | 9 | 4 | 4 | 1 | 70 | 25 |
| Olimpija Ljubljana | 2020–21 | Slovenian PrvaLiga | 6 | 0 | 0 | 0 | 2 | 0 | 8 | 0 |
| Hermannstadt | 2020–21 | Liga I | 17 | 2 | 2 | 0 | — | | 19 | 2 |
| Sarajevo | 2021–22 | Bosnian Premier League | 28 | 4 | 7 | 0 | — | | 35 | 4 |
| Honka | 2022 | Veikkausliiga | 13 | 3 | — | | — | | 13 | 3 |
| Kolubara | 2022–23 | Serbian SuperLiga | 16 | 0 | — | | — | | 16 | 0 |
| Dugopolje | 2023–24 | Prva NL | 30 | 3 | — | | — | | 30 | 3 |
| Dugopolje | 2024–25 | Prva NL | 13 | 4 | 2 | 0 | – | | 15 | 4 |
| Dugopolje | Total | | 43 | 7 | 2 | 0 | 0 | 0 | 45 | 7 |
| Career total | | | 342 | 64 | 37 | 8 | 16 | 1 | 393 | 73 |
