= Dario Krišto =

Croatian footballer (born 1989)

Personal information
- Date of birth: 5 March 1989 (age 37)
- Place of birth: Tomislavgrad, SFR Yugoslavia
- Height: 1.90 m (6 ft 3 in)
- Position: Midfielder

Team information
- Current team: Omiš
- Number: 19

Youth career
- –2004: HNK Tomislav
- 2004–2008: Inter Zaprešić

Senior career*
Years	Team	Apps	(Gls)
2008–2009	Inter Zaprešić	21	(0)
2009	→ Rudeš (loan)	12	(0)
2010	Zmaj Makarska	14	(1)
2010	Omiš	15	(3)
2011	Šibenik	22	(2)
2012	Zrinjski Mostar	21	(0)
2013	Lučko	13	(0)
2013	Dugopolje	16	(0)
2014–2015	DAC Dunajská Streda	40	(2)
2015–2016	Frýdek-Místek	24	(3)
2016–2017	Třinec	27	(2)
2017–2018	Dugopolje	17	(0)
2018–2019	Widzew Łódź	41	(11)
2019–2020	GKS Tychy	29	(3)
2020–2021	Dugopolje	23	(0)
2021–2024	Posušje	58	(3)
2024–	Omiš	1	(0)
- * Club domestic league appearances and goals as of 5 March 2024

Dario Krišto (born 5 March 1989) is a Croatian professional footballer who plays as a midfielder for Omiš.

== Club career ==
=== DAC Dunajská Streda ===
He made his debut for DAC Dunajská Streda on 1 March 2014 against Košice.

== Honours ==
Widzew Łódź

- III liga, gr. I: 2017–18
