= Serdarušić =

Serdarušić (Croatian pronunciation: [serdǎruʃitɕ]) is a Croatian surname. Notable people with the surname include:

- Ante Serdarušić (born 1983), Bosnian Croat footballer
- Josip Serdarušić (born 1986), Croatian footballer
- Nino Serdarušić (born 1996), Croatian tennis player
- Zvonimir Serdarušić (born 1950), Croatian German handball coach and former player competed for Yugoslavia
