= Sunara =

Sunara is a both a given name and a surname. Notable people with the name include:

- Hrvoje Sunara (born 1979), Croatian footballer and coach
- Ivan Sunara (born 1959), Croatian basketball player
- Sunara Begum (born 1984), English visual artist, filmmaker, photographer, and writer
