= Vitaić =

Vitaić is a Croatian surname. Notable people with the surname include:

- Ante Vitaić (born 1982), Croatian footballer
- Frane Vitaić (born 1982), Croatian footballer, brother of Ante
