= Henri Belle =

Cameroonian footballer (born 1989)

Personal information
- Date of birth: 25 January 1989 (age 37)
- Place of birth: Douala, Cameroon
- Height: 1.80 m (5 ft 11 in)
- Position: Right winger

Senior career*
Years	Team	Apps	(Gls)
2007–2009	Coton Sport Garoua		
2009–2010	Union Douala		
2010	→ Örebro SK (loan)	0	(0)
2011–2012	Istra 1961	32	(8)
2012–2015	RNK Split	71	(11)
2015	Boluspor	3	(0)
2016	Belshina Bobruisk	11	(0)
2017	CA Bizertin	0	(0)
2018	Dragon de Yaoundé		
2019–2020	Cihangir GSK		
2021	Three Star Club		
- * Club domestic league appearances and goals as of 16 July 2017

Henri Belle (born 25 January 1989) is a Cameroonian former professional footballer who played as a winger.

== Career ==
Belle started his senior career at Coton Sport FC de Garoua, before he moved in the summer of 2009 to Union Douala. After a season there, he went on trial with the Swedish club Örebro SK in June 2010. He was signed on a six-month loan next month. Not being given a chance in the Allsvenskan, and refusing to play for the youth squad, his loan was terminated to mutual consent in late October.

Belle moved to Croatia at the beginning of 2011, signing with NK Istra 1961. He drew attention to himself both by good games and by controversy - by being the victim of racist taunts from some supporters and by hitting a ball boy. Belle grew to be the key player of the Istra 1961 team, and, thinking that he had overgrown his club, demanded to be transferred out, linking himself frequently with HNK Hajduk Split, but in the end signing with RNK Split. He scored his first goal for RNK Split in a 4–2 loss to Dinamo Zagreb.

After short spells at Boluspor in 2015 and FC Belshina Bobruisk in 2016, Belle signed a two-year contract for the Tunisian top-tier side CA Bizertin in January 2017, but left the club at the beginning of the summer transfer period, not having featured in a single match for that club.

In March 2018, Belle returned to Cameroon and joined Dragon de Yaoundé.
