= Sacha Marasović =

French footballer (born 1998)

Personal information
- Full name: Sacha Boris Roger Marasović
- Date of birth: 6 January 1998 (age 28)
- Place of birth: Paris, France
- Height: 1.69 m (5 ft 7 in)
- Position: Midfielder

Team information
- Current team: Dugopolje

Youth career
- 2007-2013: AS Lattes
- 2013-2016: Lorient
- 2017: Marseille

Senior career*
Years	Team	Apps	(Gls)
2017–2019	Marseille B	36	(4)
2020–2022	Inter Zaprešić	39	(2)
2022–2023	Šibenik	8	(0)
2023	Tabor Sežana	16	(3)
2023–2024	Domžale	15	(0)
2024	GOŠK Gabela	15	(1)
2024–2026	Agde	45	(5)
2026–	Dugopolje		

International career
2018	Croatia U20	2	(0)
- * Club domestic league appearances and goals as of 29 July 2026

Sacha Boris Roger Marasović (born 6 January 1998) is a professional footballer who plays as a midfielder for the Prva NL club NK Dugopolje. Born in France, he was a youth international for Croatia.

== Club career ==
Marasović, who was born in Paris, but moved to Hérault at an early age, started with his local club from the age of 9 to 15, moving in 2013 to the FC Lorient academy, leaving it after 3 seasons, and not having a club for 6 months. He then started his senior career with the reserves of French Ligue 1 side Marseille. Before the second half of the 2019–20 season, Marasović signed for Inter Zaprešić in Croatia, where he suffered relegation to the Croatian second division. On 23 February 2020, he debuted for Inter Zaprešić in a 3–2 loss to Dinamo Zagreb. On 21 November 2021, Marasović scored his first goals for Inter Zaprešić in a 3–0 win over BSK.

== International career ==
Marasović was eligible to represent Croatia internationally through his parents. In 2018, he made two appearances for the Croatia under-20 team against Russia.
