= Ante Rebić =

Croatian footballer (born 1993)

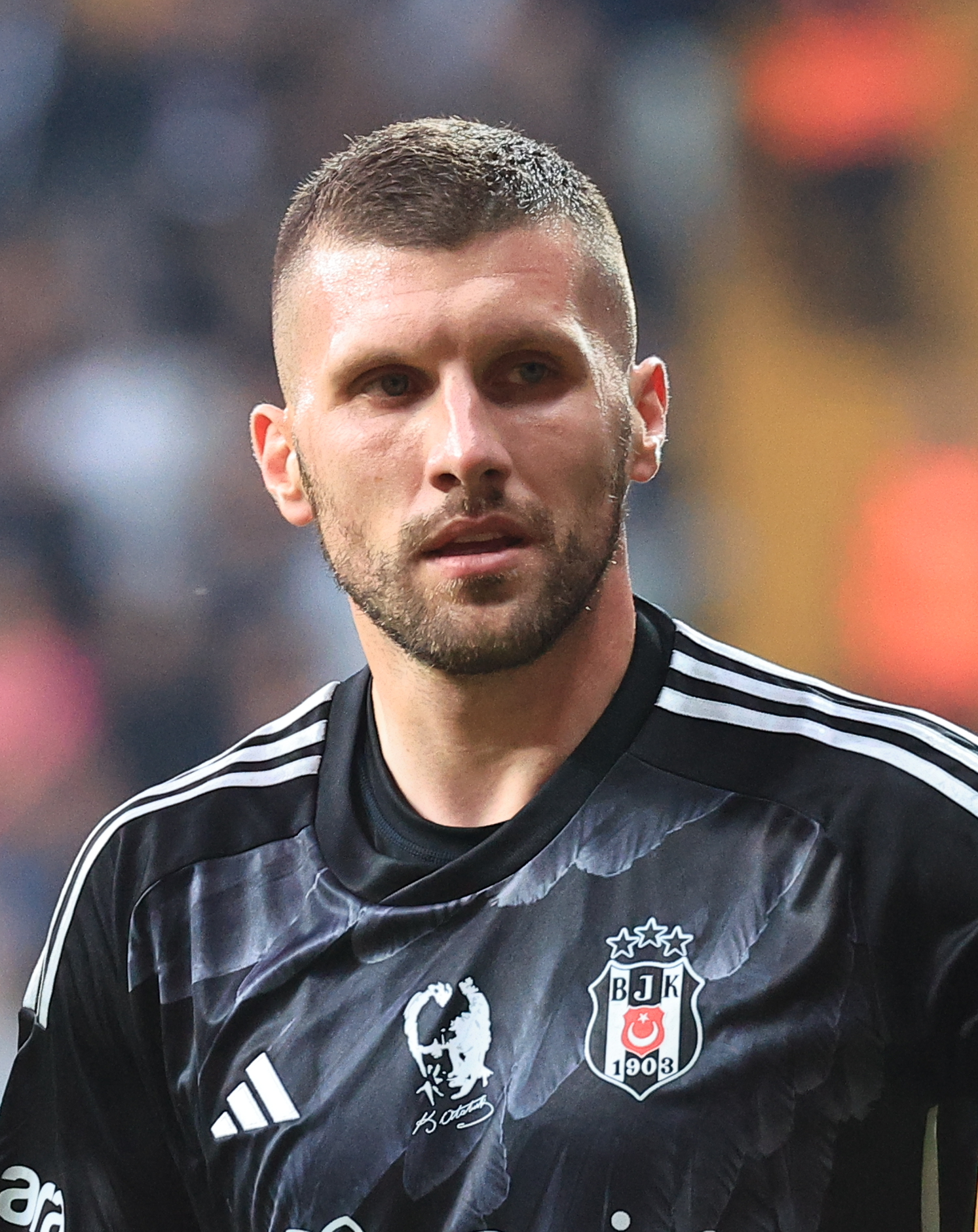
- Rebić playing for Beşiktaş in 2023

Personal information
- Full name: Ante Rebić
- Date of birth: 21 September 1993 (age 33)
- Place of birth: Split, Croatia
- Height: 1.85 m (6 ft 1 in)
- Position: Left winger

Youth career
- 2002–2008: Vinjani
- 2008–2010: Imotski
- 2010–2011: RNK Split

Senior career*
| Years | Team | Apps | (Gls) |
| 2011–2013 | RNK Split | 54 | (16) |
| 2013–2018 | Fiorentina | 8 | (2) |
| 2014–2015 | → RB Leipzig (loan) | 11 | (0) |
| 2015–2016 | → Hellas Verona (loan) | 10 | (0) |
| 2016–2018 | → Eintracht Frankfurt (loan) | 49 | (8) |
| 2018–2020 | Eintracht Frankfurt | 29 | (9) |
| 2019–2020 | → AC Milan (loan) | 26 | (11) |
| 2020–2023 | AC Milan | 74 | (16) |
| 2023–2024 | Beşiktaş | 15 | (0) |
| 2024–2025 | Lecce | 27 | (1) |
| 2025–2026 | Hajduk Split | 26 | (7) |

International career^{‡}
| 2011 | Croatia U18 | 3 | (0) |
| 2011–2012 | Croatia U19 | 5 | (3) |
| 2012–2013 | Croatia U20 | 6 | (3) |
| 2012–2013 | Croatia U21 | 8 | (4) |
| 2013–2021 | Croatia | 42 | (3) |
Medal record
Men's football
Representing Croatia
FIFA World Cup
| Runner-up | 2018 Russia |
- * Club domestic league appearances and goals as of 25 June 2026 ‡ National team caps and goals as of 18:40, 28 June 2021 (UTC)

Ante Rebić (Croatian pronunciation: [ǎːnte rěːbitɕ]; born 21 September 1993) is a former Croatian professional footballer who played as a left winger. Mainly a winger, he can be deployed at any forward position.

Rebić began his senior career at RNK Split, and in 2013 signed for Serie A club Fiorentina for an undisclosed fee. He spent most of his time there out on loan to RB Leipzig, Hellas Verona, and Eintracht Frankfurt, before joining the latter permanently in July 2018. In September 2019, he returned to Italian football, joining AC Milan, initially on a two-year loan, before joining permanently a year later.

Rebić made his senior international debut for Croatia in 2013. That same year, he was voted Croatian Football Hope of the Year. He represented them at the FIFA World Cup in 2014 and 2018, reaching the final of the latter, as well as at the UEFA Euro 2020.

== Club career ==
=== Youth levels ===
Rebić started his career playing at youth level for Vinjani before he moved to Imotski in 2008, where he spent two seasons. After his good performances at a tournament in Italy in 2010, where he went with Hajduk Split youth team, Rebić was brought to RNK Split by Darko Butorović.

=== RNK Split ===
Rebić made his debut for the first team against Dinamo Zagreb on 21 May 2011 in the last round of the 2010–11 Prva HNL as a second-half substitute. The match ended in a 1–1 draw, with Rebić scoring the late equalizer. In August 2011, Rebić signed a professional three-year contract with RNK Split. In the 2011–12 season, Rebić scored 5 league goals in 20 appearances, four of them when coming off the bench. In the 2012–13 season, Rebić scored 10 league goals in 29 appearances.

=== Fiorentina ===
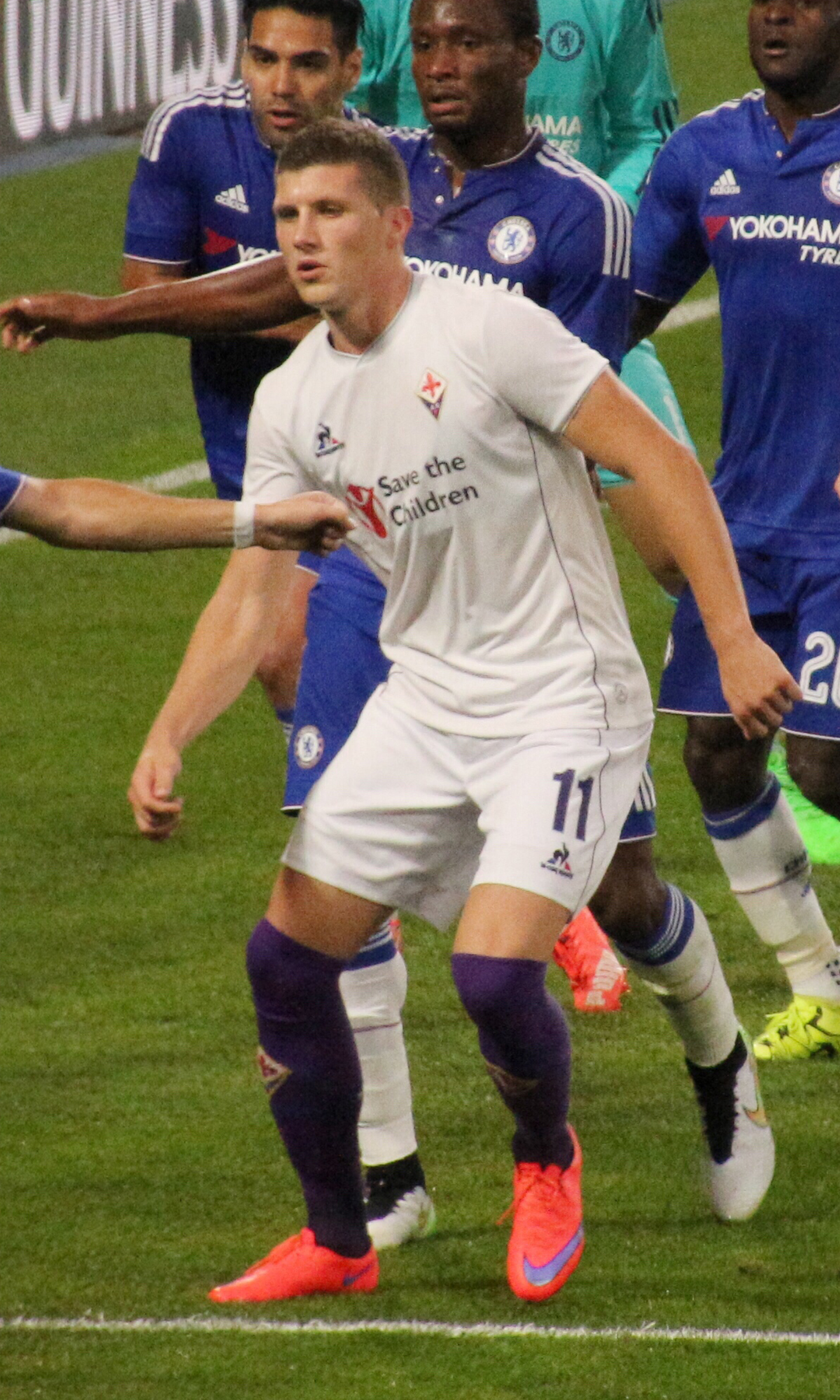
Rebić playing for Fiorentina in 2015

On 28 August 2013, Rebić signed a five-year contract with Serie A club Fiorentina, for an undisclosed fee. Upon passing the medical exams, he was given the number 9 shirt. He made a debut on 30 September, coming on as a 36th-minute substitute for injured teammate Giuseppe Rossi, in a 2–2 home draw against Parma. During his debut he sustained an injury, causing him to be sidelined for three weeks. Rebić made three more appearances for Fiorentina before he scored his first goal on 8 January 2014, starting and scoring the second goal of a 2–0 Coppa Italia last-16 home win against Chievo Verona. On 18 May, he scored his first goal in Serie A in 2–2 draw against Torino at the Stadio Artemio Franchi, two minutes after replacing Manuel Pasqual.

On 3 August 2014, Rebić joined 2. Bundesliga club Leipzig for a season-long loan deal. After his loan spell with Leipzig ended, Rebić returned to Fiorentina and was given the number 11 shirt, previously worn by Juan Cuadrado, and was used primarily on the left wing. He made his European debut with the club on 1 October in a 4–0 defeat of Belenenses in the Europa League. In their next match in that competition, Rebić was sent off for a reckless challenge in stoppage time in a 2–1 defeat to Lech Poznań. On 1 November, he scored his first goal in Serie A, in a 4–1 win against Frosinone.

After only making six appearances and scoring once for Fiorentina, Rebić was loaned to Hellas Verona on 14 January 2016. However, he failed to score in nine appearances, and Verona were relegated to Serie B. On 20 March, on as a halftime substitute for Giampaolo Pazzini, he was sent off for two yellow cards at the end of a 2–1 loss to Carpi in the Stadio Marc'Antonio Bentegodi.

=== Eintracht Frankfurt ===
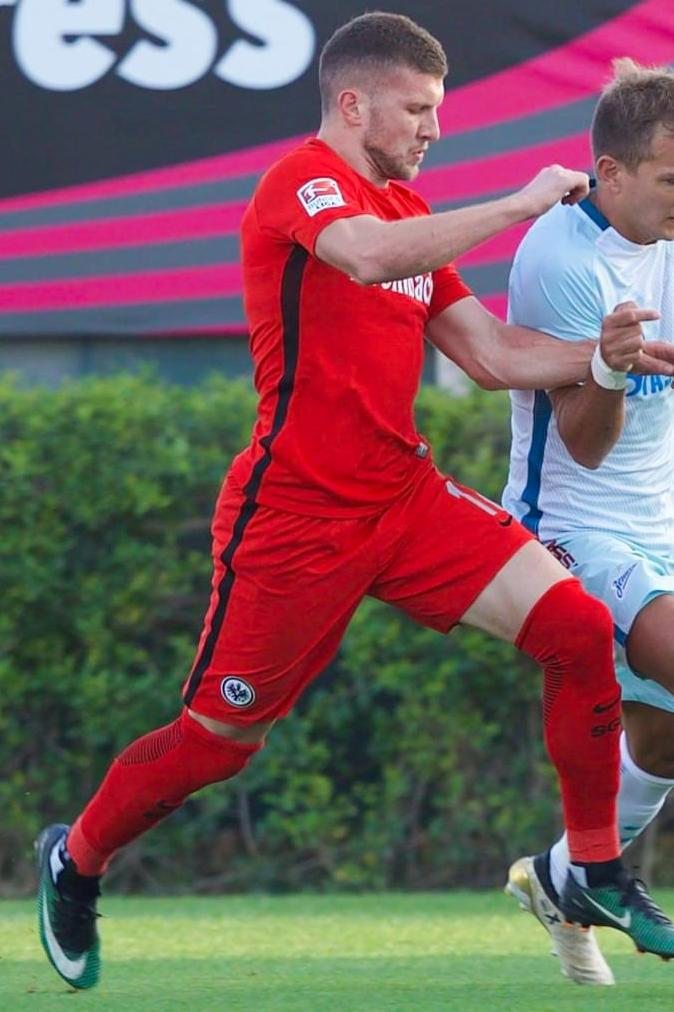
Rebić playing for Eintracht Frankfurt in 2017

Rebić joined Bundesliga club Eintracht Frankfurt on a season-long loan on 11 July 2016, reuniting with former national team manager Niko Kovač. After a short battle with mononucleosis, Rebić made his debut on 17 September against Bayer Leverkusen, coming on as a substitute and assisting Marco Fabián for the winning goal in a 2–1 victory. On 5 February 2017 he scored his first goal for his new team to conclude a 2–0 win over fellow Hesse team SV Darmstadt 98 at the Commerzbank Arena. On 27 May, he equalised in the 2017 DFB-Pokal Final, though Frankfurt lost 2–1 to Borussia Dortmund. On 31 August 2017, Rebić joined Eintracht a second time on loan for another year with an option to buy. Across all competitions, he scored nine goals and assisted three that season. This included two goals on 19 May in the 2018 DFB-Pokal Final, a 3–1 victory that gave his club their first cup since 1988 and denied Bayern Munich to complete their double. At the conclusion of the season, Eintracht Frankfurt exercised their option to purchase Rebić permanently for €2 million.

On 10 August 2018, Rebić signed a new contract to last until June 2022. He had been tracked by clubs including Manchester United, Tottenham Hotspur, Bayern Munich and Sevilla, and Eintracht had lost several of their star players in addition to Kovač, who joined Bayern. Two days later, Eintracht lost the 2018 DFL-Supercup at home to precisely that team, with Rebić a 64th-minute substitute.

On 11 August 2019, he scored a hat-trick in a DFB-Pokal match against Waldhof Mannheim, which Eintracht won 5–3.

=== AC Milan ===
==== 2019–20 ====
On 2 September 2019, Rebić returned to Italy and signed a two-year loan deal with Serie A club AC Milan, with André Silva moving in the other direction.

After spending the first half of the season on the bench, having played more minutes for the national team than the club, Rebić scored his first two league goals in a 3–2 victory over Udinese on 19 January 2020, having come on as a half-time substitute for Giacomo Bonaventura. A week later, he continued his super sub goalscoring run with a single goal in a 1–0 away victory over Brescia. On 9 February, he scored the opener in Derby della Madonnina; however, the game ended as a 4–2 victory for Inter Milan. Four days later, he scored Milan's only goal in a 1–1 draw with Juventus in Coppa Italia. On 17 February he scored the only goal in a 1–0 victory over Torino. On 12 June, in the club's first game after the COVID-19 pandemic, the second leg of Coppa Italia fixture against Juventus, Rebić was sent off after sixteen minutes due to a rough tackle on Juventus' defender Danilo. On 4 July, he scored the third goal in a 3–0 victory over title contenders Lazio, their first home defeat of the season. On 7 July, he won a penalty, provided an assist and scored in a 4–2 comeback victory over Juventus. In total for the season, Rebic scored 12 goals, and assisted 4.

==== 2020–21: contributions and second place finish ====
On 12 September 2020, Milan exercised their option to purchase Rebić permanently, and signed the player on a five-year contract. On 27 September, he won a penalty that Franck Kessié successfully converted into the first goal of the 2–0 victory over Crotone; however, in the 58th minute of the game, he fell during a counterattack and dislocated his elbow. He returned to the team on 1 November, coming on for Rafael Leão in the 71st minute of the 2–1 victory over Udinese. On 23 December, he scored his first goal of the season, the opening goal in the 3–2 victory over Lazio. On 6 January 2021, he tested positive for COVID-19 and was ruled out of the derby against Juventus, which Milan lost 3–1, their first defeat of the season. On 28 February, he scored the winning goal in the 2–1 victory over Roma. On 9 May, he scored a spectacular goal in a 3–0 victory over Juventus, winning Milan crucial three points for the Champions League qualification. Three days later, in a 7–0 routing of Torino, he provided Théo Hernandez with an assist for the fourth goal before scoring a hat-trick. In total this season, Rebic scored 11 goals and assisted 3.

==== 2021–22: injuries ====
On 12 September 2021, he assisted on both goals in a 2–0 victory over Lazio. Three days later, Rebić made his Champions League debut in a 3–2 defeat to Liverpool, scoring Milan's first goal. On 19 September, he scored the equalizer against Juventus in a 1–1 draw, his 3rd overall league goal against Juventus. On 24 November it was reported that Rebic was injured in the training and expected to be out for a month. However he was not back on the pitch again until 9 January 2022 against Venezia. On 19 February, he scored the equalizer in away game against Salernitana, which ended 2–2, a powerful shot from 25 yards, it was his first goal in 5 months.

=== Beşiktaş ===
On 31 July 2023, Rebić signed a two-year contract with Süper Lig club Beşiktaş. On 31 July 2024, it was announced that Rebić's contract had been terminated.

=== Lecce ===
On 26 August 2024, Rebić returned to Italy and signed for Serie A club Lecce. He scored his first goal for Lecce with a last minute, stoppage time goal to draw with Juventus on 1 December 2024.

=== Hajduk Split ===
On 1 August 2025, Rebić signed with Hajduk Split for one season.

== International career ==
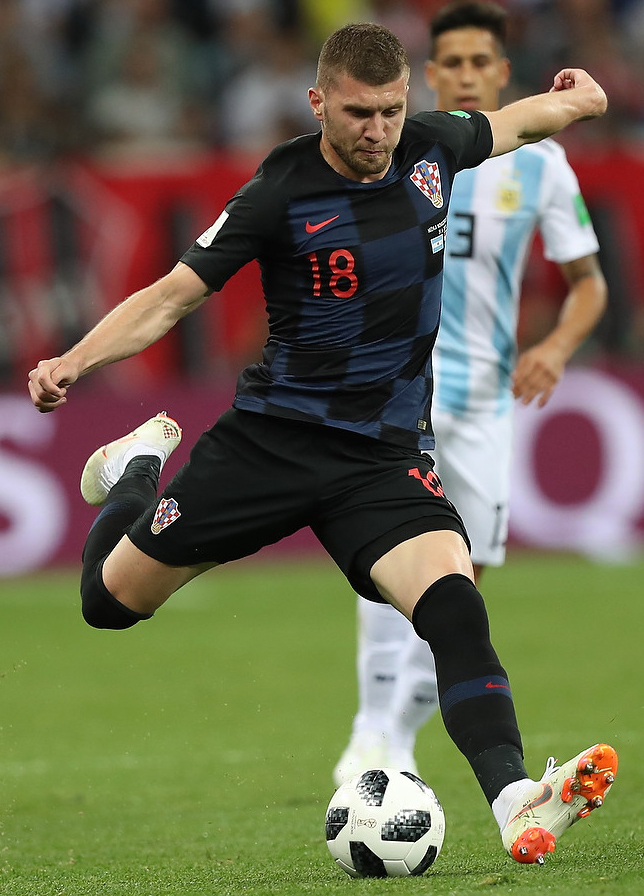
Rebić playing for Croatia at the 2018 FIFA World Cup

On 31 July 2013, Rebić was called up for the first time to the national team, ahead of a friendly away to Liechtenstein. He came on as a 63rd-minute substitute for Ivica Olić in the match, and four minutes later he scored in the 3–2 win. He was praised by manager Igor Štimac after the game.

Upon the arrival of the new national team coach Niko Kovač, his former Croatia U21 coach, Rebić was called up for the decisive World Cup play-off matches against Iceland in November 2013. He came on as a substitute in both games, as Croatia secured their spot in the 2014 FIFA World Cup by winning 2–0 on aggregate.

Rebić was named in Kovač's final 23-man squad for the tournament in Brazil. He took part in the opening match against the hosts in São Paulo, as a late substitute in a 3–1 defeat. He played the same role in the next two matches as the Croatians were eventually eliminated from the group, and lasted only 20 minutes before being sent off versus Mexico in their last match for a studs-up tackle on Carlos Peña.

From June 2015 to November 2017, Rebić was not capped for Croatia. He was named in manager Zlatko Dalić's final squad for the 2018 FIFA World Cup in Russia. In the second group match against Argentina in Nizhny Novgorod, he volleyed after a mistake by opposing goalkeeper Willy Caballero to open a 3–0 Croatian win. In the Round of 16 match against Denmark, he had a chance to score near the end of extra time but was fouled by Mathias Jørgensen; Luka Modrić missed the resulting penalty but the Croats won in the shootout. Rebić started in the final, and was substituted for Andrej Kramarić after 71 minutes of a 4–2 loss to France at the Luzhniki Stadium.

He scored his third international goal on 24 March 2019 in an upset 2–1 defeat to Hungary in Budapest during Croatia's Euro 2020 qualifying campaign. After he had been benched at the club, his drop in form could also be seen in the qualifying games, which caused a public outcry and endangered his spot in the Euro squad.

After missing the majority of Croatia's 2020–21 Nations League campaign due to injuries, Rebić was included in Dalić's final squad for the UEFA Euro 2020. In Croatia's first two group stage games against England and the Czech Republic, Rebić was deployed by Dalić as a striker rather than a winger with poor results, as Croatia lost 1–0 and drew 1–1 respectively. In the Round of 16 match against Spain, Rebić came off the field in the 38th minute to change his boots. At that moment, Croatia were 1–0 up and Spain were in the attack, resulting in Pablo Sarabia's equalizing goal. Croatia would go on to lose the match 5–3 after extra time. Following the intense criticism he received in his homeland for that gesture, part of which came from Dalić himself, Rebić criticized Dalić and the Croatian Football Federation on his Instagram account saying that "it is a fact that [the national team] have been [shit] for the past two, three years" and that he is "personally sorry that they had nobody to make use of this talented generation". He also went on to ironically criticize Croatian pundits (more precisely Robert Prosinečki, Goran Vlaović and Antun Samovojska), telling them to "let go of spritzer before broadcasts" (alluding to Prosinečki's drinking issues) and to "cheer for Croatia instead". Shortly after, he deleted the posts and deactivated his account. Ahead of the September World Cup qualifiers against Russia, Slovakia and Slovenia, Rebić was omitted from the national team.

== Style of play ==
Rebić is known for his physical strength and running speed, both on and off the ball; in 2019, he was the second fastest player in the Bundesliga alongside Achraf Hakimi after clocking at 21.81 mph while playing for Eintracht, as well as the fastest player at the 2018 World Cup alongside Cristiano Ronaldo after clocking at 34 km/h. He is good at dribbling, especially in one on one situations, and at protecting the ball with his body strength when challenged. His first touch, however, has been cited as one of the areas of his game that is in need of improvement, with the others being the accuracy of his passing, crossing, and shots from long range, as well as his decision-making in high-pressure situations. Tactically, Rebić is a versatile forward who can operate in several positions across various formations. While he is mainly fielded as a left winger in a 4–3–3 or 4–2–3–1, he can also play as an out-and-out striker or supporting striker in a 4–4–2, while during Eintracht's 2018–19 season he was deployed as an attacking midfielder in a 3–4–1–2, forming a fluid goalscoring triangle with Luka Jović and Sébastien Haller. Aside from his attacking duties, he has been praised for his willingness to participate in his team's defensive plays, including the pressing or counter-pressing of the opposition.

== Personal life ==
In June 2018, it was reported that Rebić paid off all of the loans of the residents of Vinjani Donji, his childhood village. In February 2021, Rebić donated €10,000 to help fund the building of a new facility for the rehabilitation and education of children in Slavonski Brod.

== Career statistics ==
=== Club ===
As of match played 14 August 2025

Appearances and goals by club, season and competition
| Club | Season | League | | | National cup (Note: Includes Croatian Cup, Coppa Italia, DFB-Pokal, Turkish Cup) | | Europe | | Other | | Total | |
| Club | Season | Division | Apps | Goals | Apps | Goals | Apps | Goals | Apps | Goals | Apps | Goals |
|---|---|---|---|---|---|---|---|---|---|---|---|---|
| RNK Split | 2010–11 | Prva HNL | 1 | 1 | 0 | 0 | — | | — | | 1 | 1 |
| RNK Split | 2011–12 | Prva HNL | 20 | 5 | 1 | 0 | 3 (Note: Appearances in UEFA Europa League) | 0 | — | | 24 | 5 |
| RNK Split | 2012–13 | Prva HNL | 29 | 10 | 2 | 2 | — | | — | | 31 | 12 |
| RNK Split | 2013–14 | Prva HNL | 4 | 0 | 0 | 0 | — | | — | | 4 | 0 |
| RNK Split | Total | | 54 | 16 | 3 | 2 | 3 | 0 | 0 | 0 | 60 | 18 |
| Fiorentina | 2013–14 | Serie A | 4 | 1 | 1 | 1 | — | | — | | 5 | 2 |
| Fiorentina | 2015–16 | Serie A | 4 | 1 | 1 | 0 | 2 | 0 | — | | 7 | 1 |
| Fiorentina | Total | | 8 | 2 | 2 | 1 | 2 | 0 | 0 | 0 | 12 | 3 |
| RB Leipzig (loan) | 2014–15 | 2. Bundesliga | 10 | 0 | 1 | 0 | — | | — | | 11 | 0 |
| Hellas Verona (loan) | 2015–16 | Serie A | 10 | 0 | 0 | 0 | — | | — | | 10 | 0 |
| Eintracht Frankfurt (loan) | 2016–17 | Bundesliga | 24 | 2 | 4 | 1 | — | | — | | 28 | 3 |
| Eintracht Frankfurt (loan) | 2017–18 | Bundesliga | 25 | 6 | 3 | 3 | — | | — | | 28 | 9 |
| Eintracht Frankfurt | 2018–19 | Bundesliga | 28 | 9 | 0 | 0 | 9 | 1 | 1 (Note: Appearance in DFL-Supercup) | 0 | 38 | 10 |
| Eintracht Frankfurt | 2019–20 | Bundesliga | 1 | 0 | 1 | 3 | 4 | 0 | — | | 6 | 3 |
| Eintracht Frankfurt | Frankfurt total | | 78 | 17 | 8 | 7 | 13 | 1 | 1 | 0 | 100 | 25 |
| AC Milan (loan) | 2019–20 | Serie A | 26 | 11 | 4 | 1 | — | | — | | 30 | 12 |
| AC Milan | 2020–21 | Serie A | 27 | 11 | 1 | 0 | 5 | 0 | — | | 33 | 11 |
| AC Milan | 2021–22 | Serie A | 24 | 2 | 3 | 0 | 2 (Note: Appearances in UEFA Champions League) | 1 | — | | 29 | 3 |
| AC Milan | 2022–23 | Serie A | 23 | 3 | 0 | 0 | 7 | 0 | 1 (Note: Appearance in Supercoppa Italiana) | 0 | 31 | 3 |
| AC Milan | Milan total | | 100 | 27 | 8 | 1 | 14 | 1 | 1 | 0 | 123 | 29 |
| Beşiktaş | 2023–24 | Süper Lig | 15 | 0 | 2 | 1 | 6 (Note: Appearances in UEFA Europa Conference League) | 0 | — | | 23 | 1 |
| Lecce | 2024–25 | Serie A | 27 | 1 | 1 | 0 | — | | — | | 28 | 1 |
| Hajduk Split | 2025–26 | HNL | 0 | 0 | 0 | 0 | 2 (Note: Appearances in UEFA Conference League) | 0 | — | | 2 | 0 |
| Career total | | | 303 | 64 | 25 | 12 | 40 | 2 | 2 | 0 | 370 | 78 |

=== International ===
As of match played 28 June 2021

Appearances and goals by national team and year
| National team | Year | Apps | Goals |
|---|---|---|---|
| Croatia | 2013 | 3 | 1 |
| Croatia | 2014 | 5 | 0 |
| Croatia | 2015 | 2 | 0 |
| Croatia | 2016 | 0 | 0 |
| Croatia | 2017 | 2 | 0 |
| Croatia | 2018 | 14 | 1 |
| Croatia | 2019 | 8 | 1 |
| Croatia | 2020 | 2 | 0 |
| Croatia | 2021 | 6 | 0 |
| Total | | 42 | 3 |

As of match played 28 June 2021
Croatia score listed first, score column indicates score after each Rebić goal

List of international goals scored by Ante Rebić
| No. | Date | Venue | Cap | Opponent | Score | Result | Competition |
|---|---|---|---|---|---|---|---|
| 1 | 14 August 2013 | Rheinpark Stadion, Vaduz, Liechtenstein | 1 | Liechtenstein | 2–1 | 3–2 | Friendly |
| 2 | 21 June 2018 | Nizhny Novgorod Stadium, Nizhny Novgorod, Russia | 18 | Argentina | 1–0 | 3–0 | 2018 FIFA World Cup |
| 3 | 24 March 2019 | Groupama Arena, Budapest, Hungary | 28 | Hungary | 1–0 | 1–2 | UEFA Euro 2020 qualifying |

== Honours ==
Eintracht Frankfurt

- DFB-Pokal: 2017–18

AC Milan

- Serie A: 2021–22

Beşiktaş

- Turkish Cup: 2023–24

Individual

- Croatian Football Hope of the Year: 2013

Orders

- Order of Duke Branimir: 2018
