= Damir Rašić =

Croatian footballer

Personal information
- Full name: Damir Rašić
- Date of birth: 5 October 1988 (age 38)
- Place of birth: Split, SFR Yugoslavia
- Height: 1.79 m (5 ft 10 1/2 in)
- Position: Defender

Team information
- Current team: HNK Zmaj

Youth career
- Zmaj Makarska
- Hajduk Split

Senior career*
Years	Team	Apps	(Gls)
2006–2007	Hajduk Split	0	(0)
2007–2008	Mosor	28	(1)
2008	Imotski	13	(0)
2009	Solin	14	(0)
2009–2013	RNK Split	29	(2)
2013–2014	Dugopolje	26	(0)
2014–2015	Krka	11	(0)
2015–2016	HNK Zmaj		
2016	Imotski	12	(1)
2016–2017	Vitez	25	(0)
2017–	HNK Zmaj		
- * Club domestic league appearances and goals as of 2 January 2018

Damir Rašić (born 5 October 1988) is a Croatian football player who plays for HNK Zmaj Makarska.
