= Andrija Vuković =

Croatian footballer

Personal information
- Date of birth: 3 August 1983 (age 43)
- Place of birth: Split, Yugoslavia
- Height: 1.89 m (6 ft 2 1/2 in)
- Position: Goalkeeper

Youth career
- –1997: Omladinac Vranjic
- 1997–2002: Hajduk Split

Senior career*
Years	Team	Apps	(Gls)
2002–2003	Hajduk Split	0	(0)
2004	→ Solin (loan)	13	(0)
2004–2006	Novalja	59	(0)
2006–2007	Mosor	27	(0)
2007–2009	Zadar	25	(0)
2009–2013	RNK Split	112	(0)
2013–2014	Dugopolje	14	(0)
2014–2015	RNK Split	11	(0)
2015–2022	Balıkesirspor	161	(0)
- * Club domestic league appearances and goals as of 20 May 2022

Andrija Vuković (born 3 August 1983) is a Croatian footballer. He is the twin brother of the handball player Drago Vuković.
