= Ante Erceg =

Croatian footballer (born 1989)

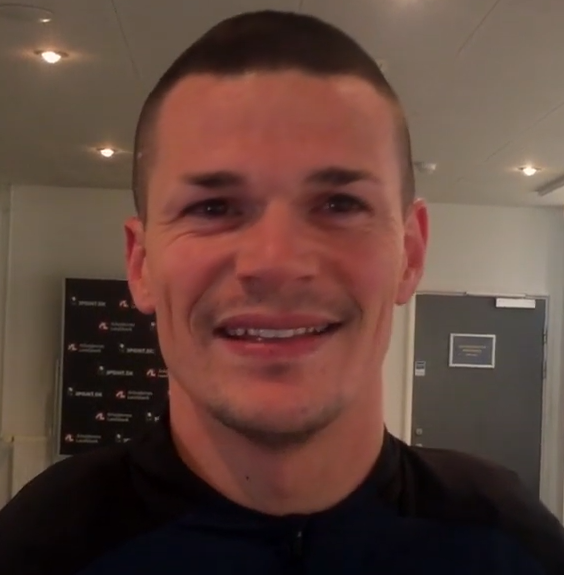
- Erceg in 2018

Personal information
- Date of birth: 12 December 1989 (age 36)
- Place of birth: Split, SR Croatia, Yugoslavia
- Height: 1.80 m (5 ft 11 in)
- Positions: Forward; winger

Team information
- Current team: Gorica
- Number: 50

Youth career
- 2001–2008: RNK Split

Senior career*
Years	Team	Apps	(Gls)
2008–2016	RNK Split	100	(18)
2010	→ Junak Sinj (loan)	7	(0)
2016	Balıkesirspor	14	(2)
2016–2018	Hajduk Split	44	(20)
2018	Shabab Al-Ahli	10	(2)
2018–2022	Brøndby	24	(4)
2020	→ Esbjerg (loan)	7	(0)
2020–2022	→ Osijek (loan)	30	(4)
2022	Debrecen	0	(0)
2022–2024	Istra 1961	42	(18)
2024	Fortuna Sittard	14	(0)
2025–	Gorica	32	(7)
- * Club domestic league appearances and goals as of 15 June 2026

Ante Erceg (born 12 December 1989) is a Croatian professional footballer who plays as a forward for Croatian club Gorica.

== Career ==
=== RNK Split ===
Erceg went through the youth system at RNK Split, graduating to the senior squad in 2008. In his first senior season, he immediately played a notable role. Erceg quickly became a fan favourite, to such a degree that the fan group, the Crveni đavoli (Red Devils) awarded him the then newly established award for the most combative player, the Splitski dišpet. Also, as a kind of fan recognition to Erceg for his commitment and fighting spirit, an interview with him was featured in the second issue of the Red Devils fan newspaper. He mainly played as a midfielder while at RNK Split. In the second half of the 2009–10 season, Erceg was briefly sent on loan to Junak Sinj, where he made seven appearances. At the beginning of the 2010–11 season, he returned to Stadion Park Mladeži to continue playing for RNK Split.

=== Hajduk Split ===
He spent half a season at Turkish club Balıkesirspor, before returning to Croatia to sign for RNK Split's rivals, Hajduk Split on 18 June 2016. Erceg made his Hajduk debut on 17 July, playing 45 minutes in a 2–0 win over HNK Cibalia in the first day of the Prva HNL. He scored his first goal for the club in a 3–0 win over FC Oleksandriya in the third qualifying round of the 2016–17 Europa League. The goal was Hajduk's 300th goal in European competition.

=== Shabab Al-Ahli ===
On 8 January 2018, Erceg signed with Dubai club Shabab Al-Ahli, competing in the UAE Pro-League.

=== Brøndby ===
After a half-year spell Shabab Al-Ahli, Erceg signed a four-year contract with Danish Superliga club Brøndby IF on 6 June 2018, where he was seen to be the replacement of Teemu Pukki who had signed with Norwich City. On 16 July 2018, he scored his first goal for Brøndby in a 2–0 win over Randers. He would, however, struggle to make the starting lineup and scored only four goals in 23 appearances in the Superliga for Brøndby.

==== Esbjerg fB (loan) ====
On 22 January 2020, Erceg was loaned out to Esbjerg fB for the rest of the season. Following his loan, he stated that he was happy with the move and that Esbjerg was "a big club". He made his debut on 14 February, starting in a 1–0 win over F.C. Copenhagen. After making seven appearances and scoring no goals, he returned to Brøndby, as Esbjerg suffered relegation from the Superliga.

==== Osijek (loan) ====
Erceg joined Croatian First Football League club NK Osijek on 19 August 2020, on a season-long loan with an option to buy. The following April, the Croatian club announced they will not be buying Erceg, but that they are looking into options of retaining his services for the future. In May 2021, Erceg ruptured his right knee ligaments during training, requiring knee reconstruction surgery. On 20 May, it was announced that his loan deal with Osijek had been extended by another season.

=== Debrecen ===
On 25 May 2022, Erceg signed a one-year contract with Hungarian Nemzeti Bajnokság I club Debreceni VSC, with an option for one further year. His contract was terminated by mutual consent after two months at the club, on 21 July. He had not made his debut for the club at that point.

=== Istra 1961 ===
Erceg joined Croatian Football League club Istra 1961 on 1 August 2022, signing a one-year deal. He made his debut for the club on 6 August against his former club Osijek, replacing Advan Kadušić in the 66th minute in a late 1–0 win. On 26 August, Erceg scored his first goals for Istra, a brace, after coming on as a 66th-minute substitute for Monsef Bakrar to secure a late 2–0 away victory against Gorica at Stadion Radnik. He would also score in three consecutive games in September 2022, against Lokomotiva, Slaven and his former side Hajduk to bring his league goal tally to five in six appearances. He finished his first season at the club with 12 goals in 22 appearances.

=== Fortuna Sittard ===
On 28 May 2024, Erceg signed a two-year contract with Fortuna Sittard in the Netherlands.

=== HNK Gorica ===
On 2 January 2025, Erceg joined Croatian club HNK Gorica, on a contract until the summer of 2027.
