= Ljubomir Kokeza =

Croatian footballer

Personal information
- Full name: Ljubomir Kokeza
- Date of birth: 15 May 1920
- Place of birth: Split, Kingdom of Serbs, Croats and Slovenes
- Date of death: 22 August 1992 (aged 72)

Youth career
- 1935–1937: RNK Split

Senior career*
Years	Team	Apps	(Gls)
1937–1942	Hajduk Split	27	(0)
1942–1943	HAŠK Zagreb		
1944–1957	Hajduk Split	223	(2)

International career
1946–1952	Yugoslavia	2	(0)

Managerial career
- 1958–1959: Dalmatinac Split
- 1959–1962: Jadran Kaštel Sućurac
- 1963–1967: Al-Masry
- 1968: RNK Split
- 1968–1969: Iraq
- 1970–1971: RNK Split
- 1971–1975: Al-Hilal
- 1975–1976: Solin
- * Club domestic league appearances and goals

Ljubomir "Ljubo" Kokeza (15 May 1920 in Split – 22 August 1992) was a Croatian football player who played for Hajduk Split and Yugoslavia in the 1940s and 1950s.

== Playing career ==
=== Club ===
Ljubomir Kokeza was not only a talented player, but also a true fan of his club Hajduk Split, and always remained loyal to the club for which played for so many years. Born in Split, Kokeza began to play football in his neighbourhood quarters and joined NK Split in 1935 where he stayed for two years. In the summer of 1937, he transferred to Hajduk Split, and played two seasons for the club's youth team.

From 1939 he began to play for the seniors and remained a regular until he retired in 1957. For a brief period during the 1942–1943 season Kokeza played for HAŠK Zagreb, but he rejoined Hajduk at the end of the war.

The right back played 625 matches for Hajduk Split scoring 8 goals, and had great success at his beloved Hajduk, the first coming in the 1940–1941 season when the club won the Croatian Championship, and qualified for the Yugoslavian National Championship for the first time in the club's history. He won a further Croatian Championship with the club in 1946, and followed it up with three Yugoslav league titles in 1950, 1952 and 1955.

=== International ===
Despite playing twice for Yugoslavia, against Czechoslovakia in 1946 and against Egypt in 1952, Kokeza did not have much luck at international level as his abilities deserved.

== Managerial career ==
After retiring in 1957, he managed several club sides in the lower divisions, NK Dalmatinac Split, NK Split, NK Jadran Kaštel Sućurac and NK Solin. While he spent several years coaching abroad in the 1960s and 1970s in Egypt, Iraq and Libya.

Having had a successful coaching spell in Egypt in the early to mid 1960s with Al-Masry, he became the Iraq national team's first ever foreign coach in 1968. However, after four defeats in four matches at the 1969 Jaam-e-Doosti Friendship Cup in Tehran, he spent the remainder of his contract coaching the Iraqi military team. He also managed Iraq at the 1969 CISM World Military Championship in Athens, where Iraq lost 2–0 to South Korea and drew 1–1 with Greece, having led through a strike from Nour Dhiab. The hosts managed to equalise late in the first half. Iraq finished last in their group and failed to reach the second stage. Kokeza helped the Iraq army team to the final of the 1969 Republics Cup, losing the final to the Police select team.
