= Frane Lojić =

Croatian footballer (born 1985)

Personal information
- Date of birth: 8 October 1985 (age 41)
- Place of birth: Split, SFR Yugoslavia
- Height: 1.85 m (6 ft 1 in)
- Position: Midfielder

Team information
- Current team: Hajduk Split U-16 (Manager)

Youth career
- Hajduk Split

Senior career*
Years	Team	Apps	(Gls)
2004–2005	Hajduk Split	4	(0)
2005	→ Zadar (loan)	10	(0)
2005	Mosor	16	(0)
2006	Cibalia	21	(0)
2007	Umeå	14	(0)
2008–2009	Imotski	53	(3)
2010–2012	RNK Split	37	(0)
2012–2015	Konavljanin	58	(1)

International career
2002	Croatia U17	1	(0)
2004	Croatia U20	1	(0)
2000	Croatia U21	1	(0)

Managerial career
- NA Konavle (academy coach)
- 2018–2021: Croatia Gabrile
- 2021–2022: GOŠK Dubrovnik
- 2023–2024: Zadar U-17
- 2024–: Hajduk Split U-16
- * Club domestic league appearances and goals

Frane Lojić (born 8 October 1985 in Split, Croatia) is a Croatian retired football player and current youth coach at Hajduk Split.

== Managerial career ==
Towards the end of his career, and for several years after, Lojić worked as a youth coach in NA Konavle, among others together with Zvonimir Deranja.

After three seasons at Croatia Gabrile, Lojić was named manager of GOŠK Dubrovnik in August 2021. He left the position on 1 August 2022.

On 17 July 2023 Lojić became the coach of HNK Zadar's U-17 squad. Instead, he became U-16 coach at Hajduk Split.
