= Goran Radnić =

Croatian footballer

Personal information
- Date of birth: 4 May 1983 (age 43)
- Place of birth: Split, Yugoslavia
- Height: 1.81 m (5 ft 11 1/2 in)
- Position: Defender

Youth career
- Hajduk Split

Senior career*
Years	Team	Apps	(Gls)
2002–2005	Hajduk Split	0	(0)
2002–2003	→ Novalja (loan)	16	(0)
2003–2004	→ Uskok (loan)	27	(1)
2004–2005	→ Solin (loan)	14	(0)
2005–2006	Posušje	21	(0)
2006–2007	Zimbru	24	(0)
2007–2008	Konavljanin		
2009–2011	RNK Split	59	(1)
2012	Solin		
2012	Val		
2013	Neretva		

International career
1998–1999	Croatia U15	4	(0)
1999	Croatia U16	4	(0)
1999	Croatia U17	3	(0)
- * Club domestic league appearances and goals as of 28 December 2011

Goran Radnić (born 4 May 1983 in Split) is a Croatian football player, currently a free agent after being released by RNK Split in December 2011.
