= Mate Pehar =

Croatian footballer

Personal information
- Date of birth: 25 February 1988 (age 38)
- Place of birth: Čapljina, SR Bosnia and Herzegovina, SFR Yugoslavia
- Height: 1.83 m (6 ft 0 in)
- Position: Midfielder

Youth career
- Neretva
- 2004: Dinamo Zagreb
- 2005–2007: Neretva

Senior career*
Years	Team	Apps	(Gls)
2007–2008	Neretva		
2008	Vrapče		
2008	Neretva	3	(0)
2009	Neretvanac	25	(4)
2010	Neretva	13	(7)
2010–2013	RNK Split	56	(4)
2014–2016	Široki Brijeg	38	(3)
2016–2019	Zrinjski Mostar	15	(0)
2018–2019	→ Čapljina (loan)		
2019–2020	Neretva		
2020	Ljubuški		
- * Club domestic league appearances and goals

Mate Pehar (born 25 February 1988 in Čapljina) is a retired Croatian football player.

== Career ==
In his professional career, he played for NK Neretva, NK Neretvanac Opuzen, RNK Split, NK Široki Brijeg and HŠK Zrinjski Mostar. He joined Zrinjski in summer 2016 after he was deemed surplus to requirements by Široki Brijeg manager Slaven Musa. He then joined Neretva from Zrinjski in summer 2019 after spending a season on loan at Čapljina.
