= Ivica Križanac =

Croatian footballer (born 1979)

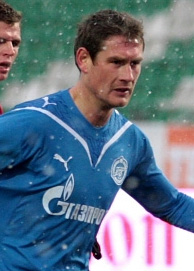
- Ivica Križanac playing for Zenit Saint Petersburg

Personal information
- Date of birth: 13 April 1979 (age 47)
- Place of birth: Split, SFR Yugoslavia
- Height: 1.87 m (6 ft 2 in)
- Position: Centre-back

Youth career
- Omiš
- Šibenik

Senior career*
Years	Team	Apps	(Gls)
1997–1998	Šibenik	7	(0)
1998–2000	Slaven Belupo	8	(0)
2000	Varteks	5	(0)
2000–2001	Jablonec	2	(0)
2001–2003	Sparta Prague	1	(0)
2003	Górnik Zabrze	13	(1)
2003–2005	Dyskobolia	49	(4)
2005–2011	Zenit Saint Petersburg	100	(6)
2011–2014	RNK Split	63	(4)

International career
2008–2010	Croatia	11	(0)
- * Club domestic league appearances and goals

Ivica Križanac (born 13 April 1979) is a Croatian former professional footballer who played as a centre-back.

== Club career ==
Križanac was born in Split. He played for Polish outfit Górnik Zabrze where he became one of Ekstraklasa's best players. Following a two-year stay at Dyskobolia Grodzisk Wielkopolski he joined Russian Premier League side Zenit Saint Petersburg in 2005. He played in the 2008 UEFA Cup Final for Zenith, winning the biggest trophy of his career after beating Glasgow Rangers. Križanac was released by Zenit Saint Petersburg in January 2011, after spending six seasons at the club.

== International career ==
Križanac made his international debut for Croatia in a friendly match against Slovenia on 20 August 2008 in Maribor, coming on as a half-time substitute for Dario Šimić. He was regularly included in the squad during the team's qualifying campaign for the 2010 FIFA World Cup, making 6 appearances in the competition. His final international appearance came in a friendly match against Belgium on 3 March 2010. After winning 11 caps for Croatia, he officially retired from the national team in May 2010.

== Career statistics ==
=== Club ===
Appearances and goals by club, season and competition
Club	Season	League			National Cup		Continental		Other		Total	
Club	Season	Division	Apps	Goals	Apps	Goals	Apps	Goals	Apps	Goals	Apps	Goals
Zenit Saint Petersburg	2005	Russian Premier League	12	2	2	0	8	0	–		22	2
Zenit Saint Petersburg	2006	Russian Premier League	16	0	1	0	–		–		17	0
Zenit Saint Petersburg	2007	Russian Premier League	15	0	5	0	–		–		20	0
Zenit Saint Petersburg	2008	Russian Premier League	25	1	0	0	14	0	2	0	41	0
Zenit Saint Petersburg	2009	Russian Premier League	18	2	2	1	5	0	–		25	3
Zenit Saint Petersburg	2010	Russian Premier League	14	1	1	0	5	0	–		20	1
Zenit Saint Petersburg	Total		100	6	11	1	32	0	2	0	145	7
Career total			100	6	11	1	32	0	2	0	145	7

== Honours ==
Sparta Prague

- Czech First League: 2000–01

Zenit St. Petersburg

- Russian Premier League: 2007, 2010
- Russian Cup: 2010
- Russian Super Cup: 2008
- UEFA Cup: 2008
- UEFA Super Cup: 2008

Individual

- Piłka Nożna Foreigner of the Year: 2004
