= Ivan Baraban =

Croatian footballer

Personal information
- Full name: Ivan Baraban
- Date of birth: 21 January 1988 (age 38)
- Place of birth: Vinkovci, SFR Yugoslavia
- Height: 1.78 m (5 ft 10 in)
- Position: Forward

Team information
- Current team: Tomislav Cerna

Youth career
- –2002: Mladost Vođinci
- 2002–2007: Cibalia

Senior career*
| Years | Team | Apps | (Gls) |
| 2007–2011 | Cibalia | 82 | (9) |
| 2011–2014 | Split | 66 | (6) |
| 2014–2015 | Osijek | 14 | (2) |
| 2015–2018 | Široki Brijeg | 56 | (6) |
| 2018–2019 | Sloboda Tuzla | 30 | (5) |
| 2020–2021 | Cibalia | 20 | (3) |
| 2021–2022 | Jarun Zagreb | 9 | (1) |
| 2022–2023 | Mladost Ždralovi | 28 | (10) |
| 2023–2026 | Mladost Vođinci | 72 | (41) |
| 2026– | Tomislav Cerna | | |
- * Club domestic league appearances and goals as of 4 August 2026

Ivan Baraban (born 21 January 1988) is a Croatian footballer who plays as a forward for Tomislav Cerna in the Treća NL, the fourth tier of Croatian football.

== Career ==
Baraban joined Mladost Vođinci, after a spell at Jarun Zagreb.

=== Club ===
Široki Brijeg

- Bosnian Cup: 2016–17
