= Predrag Šimić =

Bosnian footballer

Personal information
- Full name: Predrag Šimić
- Date of birth: 26 June 1979 (age 47)
- Place of birth: Sarajevo, SFR Yugoslavia
- Height: 1.80 m (5 ft 11 in)
- Position: Midfielder

Youth career
- FK Vrbanjuša

Senior career*
Years	Team	Apps	(Gls)
1998	FK Vrbanjuša		
1998–1999	Željezničar		
1999–2003	Zagreb	79	(4)
2003–2004	Široki Brijeg	22	(4)
2004	Zrinjski Mostar	9	(0)
2005	Hajduk Split	0	(0)
2005–2006	Maribor	28	(3)
2007	Niki Volos	24	(0)
2007–2008	Rodos	26	(2)
2008–2010	Željezničar	35	(2)
2010–2011	RNK Split	40	(3)

International career
2004	Bosnia and Herzegovina	1	(0)
- * Club domestic league appearances and goals

Predrag Šimić (born 26 June 1979) is a Bosnian former footballer.

== International career ==
Šimić made one appearance for Bosnia and Herzegovina, coming on as a second-half substitute for Vladan Grujić in an April 2004 friendly match against Finland.

== Honours ==
Zagreb

- Croatian First League: 2001–02

Široki Brijeg

- Bosnian Premier League: 2003–04

Hajduk Split

- Croatian First League: 2004–05

Željezničar

- Bosnian Premier League: 2009–10
