= Josip Serdarušić =

Croatian footballer

Personal information
- Full name: Josip Serdarušić
- Date of birth: 21 November 1986 (age 39)
- Place of birth: Tomislavgrad, SFR Yugoslavia
- Height: 1.82 m (6 ft 0 in)
- Position: Midfielder

Team information
- Current team: Bjelovar
- Number: 26

Youth career
- Tomislav
- Hajduk Split
- Primorac Stobreč

Senior career*
| Years | Team | Apps | (Gls) |
| 2005–2009 | Primorac Stobreč | | |
| 2009–2012 | RNK Split | 24 | (5) |
| 2013–2015 | Dugopolje | 57 | (10) |
| 2015–2016 | KA Akureyri | 10 | (2) |
| 2016 | Segesta | 12 | (1) |
| 2016–2017 | Gorica | 35 | (0) |
| 2017– | Lučko | 15 | (2) |
| 2018 | Vinogradar | | |
| 2018 | SK Bischofshofen | 0 | (0) |
| 2018–2020 | Croatia Zmijavci | 16 | (2) |
| 2020–2022 | Posušje | 51 | (11) |
| 2022– | Bjelovar | | |
- * Club domestic league appearances and goals

Josip Serdarušić (born 21 November 1986 in Tomislavgrad) is a Croatian footballer.

== Career ==
Serdarušić had a spell in Iceland's second tier in 2015.
