= Romano Obilinović =

Croatian footballer (born 1979)

Personal information
- Full name: Romano Obilinović
- Date of birth: 27 September 1979 (age 47)
- Place of birth: Split, SR Croatia, SFR Yugoslavia
- Height: 1.83 m (6 ft 0 in)
- Position: Forward

Senior career*
Years	Team	Apps	(Gls)
2000–2001	Tabor Sežana	22	(5)
2001–2002	Primorje	31	(16)
2002–2003	Koper	16	(3)
2003–2005	Mura	43	(19)
2005–2006	Solin	24	(10)
2006	Zadar	11	(0)
2007	Mosor	15	(6)
2007–2010	Imotski	77	(44)
2010–2013	RNK Split	55	(9)
2013	Solin		
2014–2015	Val		
2015	GOŠK Kaštel Gomilica		
2019–2021	HBDNK Mosor – Sveti Jure	24	(12)
2025	MNK Ustanik		
- * Club domestic league appearances and goals

Romano Obilinović (born 27 September 1979) is a Croatian retired professional footballer and later futsal player who played as a forward.

== Career ==
Although Obilinović had his Croatian top level debut late in his career in the 2010–11 season for RNK Split, he previously had successful spells with several clubs in the Slovenian PrvaLiga (becoming the league's top scorer in the 2001–02 season) and the Croatian Second Division, where he had stints with several clubs in Dalmatia including Solin, Zadar, Mosor and Imotski. He was the league's top scorer with Imotski in the 2009–10 season.

He also won 2016 edition of Big Brother in Croatia.
