= Velimir Vidić =

Bosnian footballer (born 1979)

Personal information
- Date of birth: 12 April 1979 (age 47)
- Place of birth: Vitez, Yugoslavia
- Height: 1.80 m (5 ft 11 in)
- Position: Defender

Senior career*
Years	Team	Apps	(Gls)
–2002	Vitez		
2003–2004	Sloboda Tuzla		
2004–2007	Zrinjski Mostar	68	(1)
2007–2008	Široki Brijeg	14	(0)
2008	Žilina	8	(0)
2009	Gossau	12	(0)
2009–2010	Šibenik	25	(0)
2010–2013	RNK Split	89	(4)
2013–2014	Vinogradar		

International career
2005–2008	Bosnia and Herzegovina	10	(0)
- * Club domestic league appearances and goals

Velimir Vidić (born 12 April 1979) is a Bosnian-Herzegovinian former professional footballer who played as a defender.

== Career ==
Vidić played in several foreign clubs, such as MŠK Žilina in the Corgoň liga and FC Gossau.

Vidić made his debut for Bosnia and Herzegovina in a February 2005 friendly match away against Iran and has earned a total of 10 caps, scoring no goals. His final international was a January 2008 friendly match against Japan.
