= Hrvoje Sunara =

Croatian footballer

Personal information
- Full name: Hrvoje Sunara
- Date of birth: 4 August 1979 (age 47)
- Place of birth: Split, SR Croatia, SFR Yugoslavia
- Height: 1.90 m (6 ft 3 in)
- Position: Goalkeeper

Team information
- Current team: Croatia U21 (goalkeeping coach); Hajduk Split (goalkeeping coach)

Youth career
- Hajduk Split

Senior career*
Years	Team	Apps	(Gls)
1999–2004	Hajduk Split	12	(0)
2004–2005	Hapoel Be'er Sheva	1	(0)
2005–2007	Pomorac	52	(0)
2008–2009	Slavonac CO	40	(0)
2009–2011	Karlovac	49	(0)
2012–2014	RNK Split	0	(0)

International career^{‡}
1998–1999	Croatia U20	3	(0)
2001	Croatia U21	4	(0)

Managerial career
- 2019–: Croatia U21 (goalkeeping coach)
- 2020–: Hajduk Split (goalkeeping coach)
- * Club domestic league appearances and goals as of 1 January 2020 ‡ National team caps and goals as of 5 October 2001

Hrvoje Sunara (born 4 August 1979) is a Croatian former professional footballer who played as a goalkeeper, and is currently the goalkeeping coach of both the Croatia national under-21 team and Hajduk Split.

== Career ==
A product of Hajduk Split youth academy, Sunara was promoted to their first squad in July 1999 at the age of 20. He spent the following five years with the club, mostly being their second or third choice goalkeeper, which saw him earning a mere 10 appearances for the club. In 2004, he was transferred to Israeli side Hapoel Be'er Sheva, only to return to Croatia in July 2005. After stints with Croatian lower level sides Pomorac and Slavonac CO, he signed for NK Karlovac in July 2009, as one of the players brought in to reinforce the club for their first ever top flight season. After terminating his contract with Karlovac through arbitration in February 2012, he joined RNK Split.

Sunara was considered a promising player when he was younger, and was capped seven times for Croatia's U-20 and U-21 selections between 1998 and 2001, and was part of the squad which competed at the 1999 FIFA World Youth Championship.
