= Ante Vitaić =

Croatian footballer (born 1982)

Personal information
- Date of birth: 7 June 1982 (age 44)
- Place of birth: Split, Yugoslavia
- Height: 1.84 m (6 ft 0 in)
- Position: Midfielder

Team information
- Current team: Hajduk Split U-11 (Manager)

Youth career
- Orkan Dugi Rat
- –2001: Hajduk Split

Senior career*
Years	Team	Apps	(Gls)
2001–2005	Hajduk Split	0	(0)
2001–2004	→ Mosor (loan)		
2005–2008	Osijek	59	(6)
2008	HamKam	10	(4)
2009–2014	RNK Split	100	(23)
2014–2015	Dugopolje	23	(7)

Managerial career
- 2016: Orkan Dugi Rat
- 2017: Uskok Klis
- 2017: Zmaj Makarska
- 2019–2020: Omiš
- 2020–2021: Solin U-11
- 2021–2022: Primorac U-17
- 2023–: Hajduk Split U-11
- * Club domestic league appearances and goals

Ante Vitaić (born 7 June 1982) is a Croatian coach and former player and current youth coach at HNK Hajduk Split.

== Playing career ==
Hailing from Dugi Rat Ante, along with his identical twin brother Frane went through the ranks of HNK Hajduk Split before being sent out on loan to NK Mosor where they would remain for the following four years. A good start of the 2004/2005 season in the Druga HNL side, when he scored 7 goals in 16 matches got him a new contract with Hajduk and he rejoined the first team. Vitaić made his debut in the 1–0 away cup loss against NK Zagreb, which would prove to be his only cap for the club. Not wishing to be loaned back to Druga HNL, the brothers annulled their contracts and joined NK Osijek.

Vitaić spent the following three years in Osijek, the highlight of his career being his goal from distance in the last, 95th minute of the 1–0 win against his former club in 2006.

In 2008 Vitaić joined the Norwegian side HamKam, but returned to Croatia after the club was relegated. He joined RNK Split, then in Treća HNL, achieving back to back promotions with them, first to Druga HNL, and then, in 2010 to Prva HNL, remaining a fixture in the club in the following seasons as well. He scored Split's second ever goal in European competition against Slovenian side Domžale in the 2011–12 Europa League.

== Managerial career ==
Vitaić was manager of Orkan Dugi Rat in the second half of the 2015–16 season and took charge of Zmaj Makarska in summer 2017. He became coach of Omiš in 2019.

In August 2020, Vitaić was appointed Head of Youth Academy at NK Solin.

In addition to that, he would also act as the youth academy coach for the U-15 squad.[8] He left the position a year later.[9] In August 2021, he took charge of the Primorac Stobreč U17s.[10]

In the summer of 2023, he was appointed U-11 coach at Hajduk Split.
