= Bojan Golubović =

Bosnian footballer

Personal information
- Date of birth: 22 August 1983 (age 43)
- Place of birth: Konjic, SR Bosnia and Herzegovina, SFR Yugoslavia
- Height: 1.87 m (6 ft 1 1/2 in)
- Position: Forward

Youth career
- 2001–2003: Zemun

Senior career*
Years	Team	Apps	(Gls)
2003–2005	Zemun	0	(0)
2003–2005	→ Padinska Skela (loan)	40	(12)
2005–2007	Leotar Trebinje	56	(19)
2008–2009	Slavonac	35	(14)
2009–2010	Međimurje	29	(13)
2010–2011	RNK Split	44	(8)
2012–2014	Ceahlăul Piatra Neamț	79	(31)
2014–2015	SønderjyskE	9	(1)
2015–2016	CSMS Iași	57	(16)
2016–2017	Steaua București	10	(0)
2017	Politehnica Iași	18	(5)
2017	Gaz Metan Mediaș	20	(3)
2018	Botoșani	13	(0)
2018–2019	Krupa	8	(1)
Total		418	(123)
- * Club domestic league appearances and goals

Bojan Golubović (Serbian Cyrillic: Бојан Голубовић; born 22 August 1983) is a Bosnian former professional footballer who played as a forward.

== Career ==
=== Ceahlăul Piatra Neamț ===
In January 2012 Golubović signed with Romanian Liga I club Ceahlăul Piatra Neamț.

He helped save his team avoid relegation, scoring 10 goals in 16 matches, and becoming the team's top goalscorer. In the 2012–13 Liga I season, Golubovic played in 33 games and scored 11 goals, being once again the team's top goalscorer. On 27 May 2013 he scored the only goal in a match against Politehnica Iași, a goal that mathematically saved Ceahlăul from relegation.
