= Filip Marčić =

Croatian professional football defender (born 1985)

Personal information
- Date of birth: 22 February 1985 (age 41)
- Place of birth: Split, SR Croatia, SFR Yugoslavia
- Height: 1.87 m (6 ft 2 in)
- Position: Right back

Youth career
- –1999: Hajduk Split
- 1999–2003: Bordeaux

Senior career*
Years	Team	Apps	(Gls)
2002–2005	Bordeaux	0	(0)
2005–2007	Hajduk Split	31	(1)
2007–2008	Rijeka	29	(0)
2008–2009	Midtjylland	7	(0)
2009–2010	Slaven Belupo	4	(0)
2011–2013	RNK Split	51	(1)
2013	Istra 1961	0	(0)
2014–2016	Solin		

International career
2002–2004	Croatia U-19	13	(1)
2004–2006	Croatia U-21	12	(0)
- * Club domestic league appearances and goals as of 10 November 2013

Filip Marčić (born 22 February 1985) is a Croatian retiredfootball defender, who last played for NK Solin Druga HNL.

== Club career ==
=== Hajduk ===
Marčić started his career in the youth ranks of Hajduk Split. In 1999, the 14-year-old defender was spotted by Girondins de Bordeaux scouts and invited to join their youth program.

=== Bordeaux ===
In France, Marčić played for the U-18 squad, but never forced his way into the first team.

=== Hajduk ===
After six years abroad, he agreed to a two-year contract with his former team Hajduk in 2005. He spent two seasons in Split, but failed to impress and was again on the move in the summer of 2007.

=== Rijeka ===
During the summer transfer window, Marčić joined rivals HNK Rijeka on a free transfer. He was a first team regular and helped his team to a fourth-place finish in the 12-team division. His displays attracted the interest of Danish side Midtjylland, who agreed to pay €400,000 to Rijeka for his services.

=== Midtjylland ===
At Midtjylland, he was given a four-year contract, but managed only seven appearances over a 16-month span, before being released in November 2009.

=== Slaven Belupo ===
In January 2010, Marčić was signed by Croatian team Slaven Belupo to a two-and-a-half-year contract. After playing just one game, incidentally against his former team Hajduk, he was injured and sidelined for the rest of the season. In September 2010, Marčić, already fined by the team for improper behavior on two occasions, was arrested for drunk driving and spent the night in the police station. Marčić's contract was subsequently terminated.

=== RNK Split ===
Without a club until the winter transfer period, Marčić then signed for RNK Split on a year and a half long contract, becoming a regular starter in the team that finished third in the league. His subsequent two years long contract was terminated halfway through in the summer of 2013, after he found himself on the sidelines.

=== Istra 1961 ===
Marčić signed for NK Istra 1961 in late July 2013, but after two months on the sidelines, without a single official game for the team, the contract was terminated.

=== International career ===
Marčić was a regular for the Croatia U-19 and U-21 squad and has totaled 25 appearances from 2002 to 2006.
