= Stadion Hrvatski vitezovi =

Football stadium in Dugopolje, Croatia

Hrvatski vitezovi
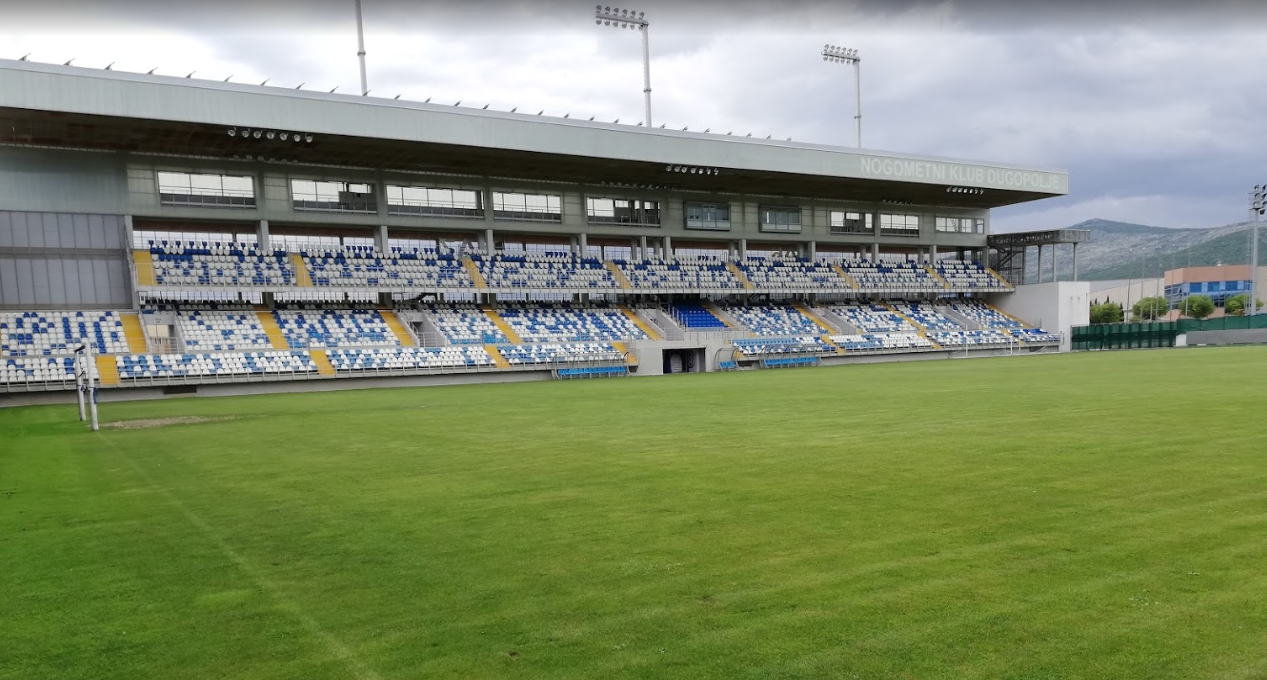
- Interactive map of Hrvatski vitezovi
- Full name: Stadion Hrvatski vitezovi
- Location: Dugopolje, Croatia
- Coordinates: 43°35′17″N 16°34′27″E
- Owner: Municipality of Dugopolje
- Capacity: 5,200
- Surface: Grass
- Scoreboard: Yes

Construction
- Opened: 22 July 2009
- Cost: HRK 55M

Tenant
- NK Dugopolje (2009–present)

Stadion Hrvatski vitezovi (English: Croatian Knights Stadium) is a football stadium in Dugopolje, near the city of Split in southern Croatia. The stadium has a capacity of 5,200 and is home to the second-level side NK Dugopolje. The stadium was officially opened on 22 July 2009, with a friendly game between Dugopolje and Hajduk Split.

The stadium's construction cost was 55 million kuna and is part of a larger sports complex which includes club's administration buildings, several swimming pools and tennis courts.

In June 2009 the stadium was visited by UEFA's stadium licensing inspection which gave it high marks, and approved the stadium to be used for European matches.

It was confirmed in May 2010 that HNK Šibenik, Croatian top-level side which had secured their European debut at the end of the 2009–10 season, will host their European matches in the following season at Dugopolje's ground, since their own Stadion Šubićevac did not meet UEFA licensing requirements.
