= Tonči Bašić =

Croatian footballer and manager

Personal information
- Date of birth: 13 March 1974 (age 52)
- Place of birth: Split, SFR Yugoslavia
- Height: 1.83 m (6 ft 0 in)
- Position: Midfielder

Team information
- Current team: RNK Split (director of sports)

Senior career*
Years	Team	Apps	(Gls)
1992–1993	RNK Split		
1993–1995	Mosor		
1995–1996	Varteks	0	(0)
1996–1997	Marsonia	19	(0)
1997	Šibenik	0	(0)
1997–1998	RNK Split		
1998	Varteks	1	(0)
1999–2000	Dukla Příbram	6	(0)
2001	Alania Vladikavkaz	3	(0)

Managerial career
- 2002–2006: Primorac 1929 (youth)
- 2006: NK Primorac 1929
- 2007–2010: RNK Split (assistant)
- 2011–2012: RNK Split
- 2013–: RNK Split (director of sports)
- * Club domestic league appearances and goals

Tonči Bašić (born 13 March 1974) is a Croatian football manager and a former player. He currently works as a director of sports for RNK Split.
