= NK Omiš =

Croatian football club

- Full name: Nogometni klub Omiš
- Nickname(s): Gusari (The Pirates)
- Founded: 1919
- Ground: Anđelko Marušić Ferata
- Capacity: 3,500
- Chairman: Vedran Kovačić
- Manager: Ante Terze
- League: Treća NL South
| Home colours | Away colours |

NK Omiš is a Croatian football club based in the town of Omiš.
