= Stadion Park Mladeži =

Football stadium in Split, Croatia

Coordinates: 43°31′09″N 16°26′39″E

Park mladeži
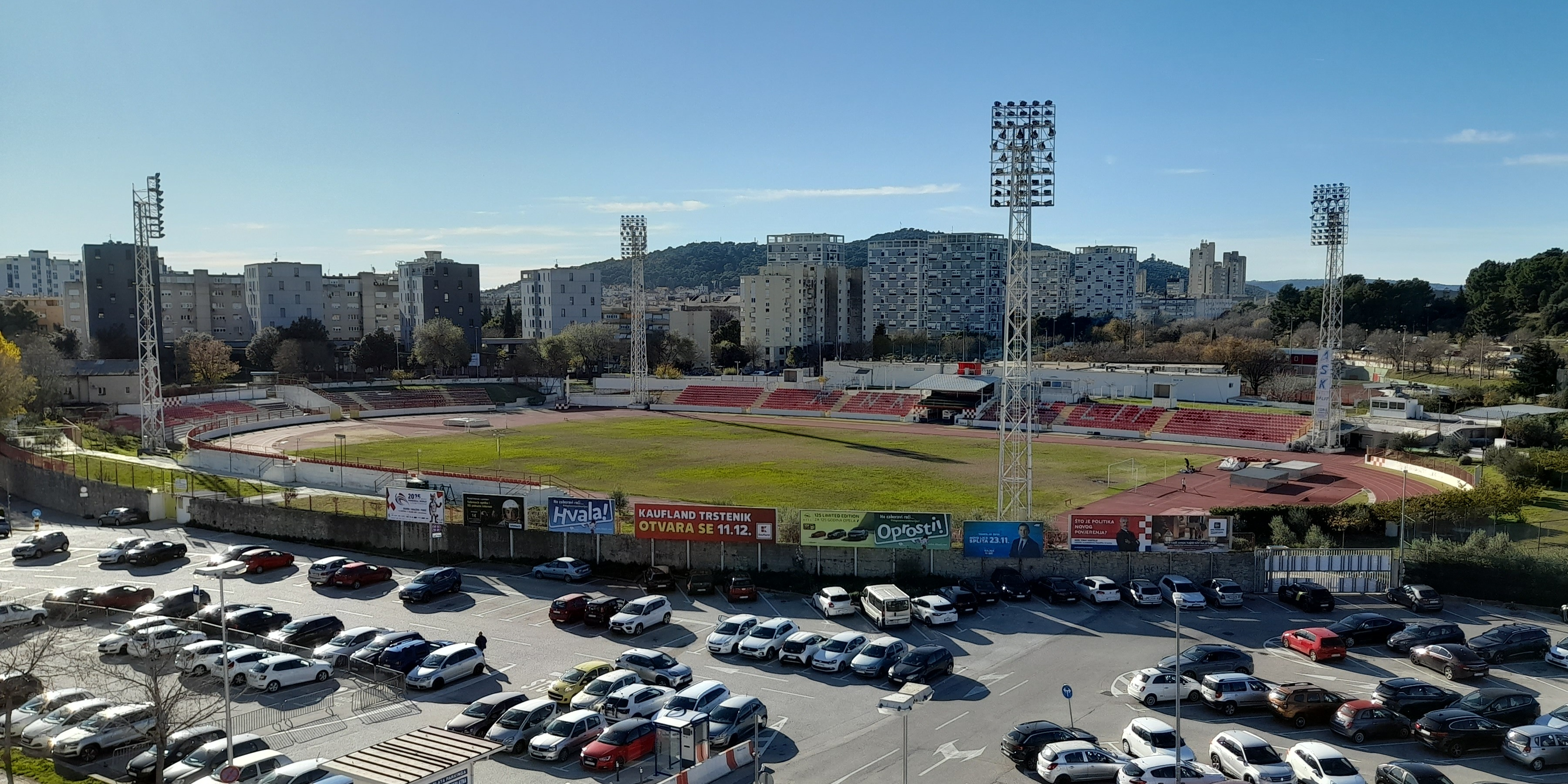
- Interactive map of Park mladeži
- Full name: Stadion Park mladeži
- Former names: Park Skojevaca
- Location: Split, Croatia
- Capacity: 4,075
- Surface: Grass

Construction
- Groundbreaking: 1949
- Opened: 1950
- Renovated: 1979

Tenants
- RNK Split; ŽNK Split; RNK Split 1912; NK Adriatic; Ultra Europe (2019–)

Stadion Park Mladeži (English: Park of Youth Stadium) is the second largest football stadium in Split, Croatia (after Poljud). It has been best known as a home to RNK Split.

The stadium was built in the 1950s (with initial construction starting in 1949) for RNK Split, who began using it in 1955. The stadium was never completed, although it went through some renovation for the 1979 Mediterranean Games which were hosted by the city.

The stadium has a total capacity of 4,075 and is located in the Brodarica neighbourhood of Split. It also has an athletics track around the pitch, which is mainly used by the Split Athletics Club (ASK). The stadium is equipped with floodlights which were taken from Stari plac Stadium when it was partially demolished during Hajduk Split's move to Poljud in 1979. Apart from the main pitch, there is also a training pitch used by other smaller clubs, such as NK Galeb, with its own stand installed in 2006.

The stadium got its current name in the 1990s. Before that, the stadium and the park around it were called Park skojevaca (English: Park of the members of SKOJ). This area of the city used to be colloquially known as Turska kula (Turkish tower), which was the stadium's original nickname.

Since 2019, Stadium is hosting annual music festival Ultra Europe which was held previously on Poljud Stadium from 2014 to 2018.
