= NK Dugopolje =

Croatian association football club

Dugopolje
- Full name: Nogometni klub Dugopolje
- Founded: 1952; 74 years ago
- Ground: Stadion Hrvatski vitezovi
- Capacity: 5,200
- Manager: Eldin Čengić
- League: First League (II)
- 2025–26: 4th of 12
Home colours	Away colours

NK Dugopolje is a Croatian professional football club based in the town of Dugopolje on the outskirts of Split, a city on the Adriatic coast. They were founded in 1952, and they currently play in the Prva nogometna liga (English: First football league), commonly Prva NL or 1. NL, is the second tier of the football league system in Croatia.

== History ==
The club was founded in 1952 as NK Proleter.

The 2009–10 season was a successful one for Dugopolje as they finished top of the 3. HNL South and were promoted to the Croatian Second Football League. In their first season in the second division of Croatian football, Dugopolje finished eighth out of a total of 16 teams. In the following season, Dugopolje finished first, qualifying for promotion to the Prva HNL, the first division of football in Croatia, but were denied a licence for the top division due to numerous issues and remained in the second league. The 2012–13 season witnessed a large restructuring of football in Croatia during which 7 out of 16 teams were to be relegated to accommodate for a reduction in the number of contestants in the 1st division from 16 to 12. Dugopolje prevailed, finishing 8th, two places clear of relegation. In the 2013–14 season, with a reduced number of teams in the top and second division, the competition was much stronger than previously and Dugopolje struggled and barely avoided relegation.

Dugopolje fell into financial trouble in 2018 due to lower funding from the municipality. A Brazilian business consortium offered an investment, but was rejected by the club's board.

== Current squad ==
As of 7 November 2026

Note: Flags indicate national team as defined under FIFA eligibility rules; some limited exceptions apply. Players may hold more than one non-FIFA nationality.

No.	Pos.	Nation	Player
1	GK	CRO	Borna Buljan
3	DF	CRO	Ante Gagula
4	DF	CRO	Roko Kurtović
7	FW	CRO	Bruno Zdunić
8	MF	CRO	Ante Bašić
9	FW	CRO	Ante Živković
10	MF	CRO	Andrija Balić (captain)
11	MF	CRO	Mijo Caktaš
14	MF	CRO	Sacha Marasović
15	MF	SGP	Jonan Tan (on loan from Lion City Sailors)
17	FW	CRO	Stipe Mušura
18	DF	CRO	Dominik Balić

No.	Pos.	Nation	Player
19	FW	FRA	Brice Ghussein
20	MF	CRO	Josip Vuković
21	MF	CRO	Andro Sokač (on loan from Slaven Belupo)
22	DF	CRO	Marin Karabatić
23	DF	CRO	Luka Kuvačić
24	MF	CRO	Festim Shatri (on loan from Lokomotiva Zagreb)
25	DF	SUI	Haris Kozarac
26	MF	CRO	Roko Ančić
27	DF	CRO	Bruno Knežević
28	FW	SUI	Leo Perić
30	GK	CRO	Petar Mijatović

== Stadium ==
Since 2009, Dugopolje host their home matches at the newly built Stadion Hrvatski vitezovi (English: Croatian Knights Stadium), with a capacity of 5,200. The stadium meets strict UEFA standards and holds a licence for UEFA competitions.

== Recent seasons ==
Season	Division	P	W	D	L	F	A	Pts	Pos	Cup	Player	Goals
Season	League									Cup	Top goalscorer	
2005–06	3. HNL South	34	14	11	9	49	31	53	4th			
2006–07	3. HNL South	34	18	5	11	52	34	59	2nd			
2007–08	3. HNL South	34	15	6	13	44	36	51	6th			
2008–09	3. HNL South	34	12	3	19	44	45	39	13th			
2009–10	3. HNL South	32	22	5	5	63	15	71	1st			
2010–11	2. HNL	30	10	11	9	39	30	41	8th		Hrvoje Balić	9
2011–12	2. HNL	28	17	6	5	50	27	57	1st	PR	Alen Guć	16
2012–13	2. HNL	30	14	4	12	39	42	46	8th		Ivica Žuljević	13
2013–14	2. HNL	33	10	8	15	37	41	38	10th		Ivica Žuljević, Josip Serdarušić	6
2014–15	2. HNL	30	7	13	10	27	32	34	7th		Ante Vitaić	7
2015–16	2. HNL	33	11	7	15	38	41	40	7th		Ivan Bubalo	10
2016–17	2. HNL	33	12	10	11	36	32	46	6th		Mario Sačer	7
2017–18	2. HNL	33	13	7	13	34	37	46	6th		Ivan Prtajin, Josip Špoljarić	6
2018–19	2. HNL	26	13	4	9	29	26	43	5th		Ante Živković	5
2019–20	2. HNL	19	7	4	8	30	31	25	10th		Matej Jukić	7
2020–21	2. HNL	34	13	9	12	49	45	48	8th		Igor Čerina	9
2021–22	2. HNL	30	11	7	12	40	46	40	10th		Ivan Brnić	11
2022–23	1. NL	30	9	14	10	30	35	41	10th		Ivan Rodić	8
2023–24	1. NL	30	8	13	12	38	45	37	7th		Bruno Zdunić	10
2024–25	1. NL	30	6	13	14	33	52	31	11th		Dimitar Trajkov	7
2025–26	1. NL	33	16	6	11	40	38	54	4th		Josip Balić	9
