= RNK Split =

Croatian football club

- Full name: Radnički nogometni klub Split
- Nickname: Crveni (The Reds)
- Founded: 16 April 1912; 114 years ago
- Ground: Stadion Park mladeži
- Capacity: 4,075
- Chairman: Slaven Žužul
- Head coach: Dragutin Ćelić
- League: 2. ŽNL Splitsko-dalmatinska
Home colours	Away colours

Radnički nogometni klub Split (lit. 'Workers' Football Club of Split') commonly known as RNK Split, is a Croatian football club based in the city of Split. The club currently play in the 2. ŽNL, Croatia's sixth level.

== History ==
The club had a strong fanbase in the Split's shipyard. The club was founded on 16 April 1912 as Anarch, but has had several names like Borac, Jug, HAŠK, Dalmatinac, and Arsenal since then.

During the Spanish Civil War, RNK Split organized an unsuccessful expedition of his volunteers for the fight on the side of the communist coalition against Francisco Franco's forces.

In World War II, the club became well known because 120 of its players were killed fighting on the side of Josip Broz Tito's Partisans, fighting against Axis forces.

After achieving three consecutive promotions from 2008 to 2010, the club went from playing in Croatia's fourth tier to playing in the Croatian First League, Croatia's top division.

In the team's first season in the top flight in the 2010–11 season, they achieved a very respectable third spot. Because of its finish that season, they qualified to play for Europe for the first time in the club's existence and entered into the 2011–12 UEFA Europa League second qualifying round where they met Slovenian side Domžale. They won 5–2 on aggregate and in the third qualifying round they were drawn against Premier League side Fulham, whom they lost to 2–0 on aggregate.

In the 2014–15 season, the club managed to reach the Europa League playoff round after defeating Mika, Hapoel Be'er Sheva and Chornomorets Odesa, but lost 1–0 on aggregate to Italian Serie A side Torino.

== Crest and colours ==
Founded as HRŠD "Anarch", the club's first colors were black (the color of Anarchists). HRŠD stood for Hrvatsko radničko športsko društvo (Croatian Workingmen's Sports Society). In 1933, as influence of "red" (organized labour, Social democrat and Communist) youth grew stronger, the club changed its colors to all red and its name to Radnički nogometni klub Split (Workingmen's Football Club Split).

During SFR Yugoslavia RNK Split played in the top football division four times, but did not win a Championship or Cup title. The biggest success in the Yugoslav Cup was in the season of 1960–61, when they lost in the semi-finals against the Macedonian team Vardar in the game on Vardar's home stadium.

== Honours ==
- 1. HNL Third place (1):
  - 2010–11
- Croatian Football Cup Runners-up (1):
  - 2014–15
- Yugoslav Second League Winner (2):
  - 1956–57 (Zone I), 1959–60 (West)
- Croatian Republic Football League Winner (1):
  - 1983–84 (South)
- 2. HNL Winner (3):
  - 1996–97 (South), 1997–98 (South), 2009–10
- 3. HNL Winner (1):
  - 2008–09 (South)
- 4. HNL Winner (1):
  - 2007–08 (South)

== Recent seasons ==
Season	Division	P	W	D	L	F	A	Pts	Pos	Cup	Competition	Round	Player	Goals
Season	League									Cup	Other competitions		Top goalscorer	
1992	2. HNL South	14	8	4	2	19	8	20	3rd					
1992–93	2. HNL South	30	17	10	3	58	15	44	2nd	R1				
1993–94	2. HNL South	30	12	6	12	53	42	30	6th					
1994–95	2. HNL South	32	15	10	7	51	34	55	4th	R2				
1995–96	2. HNL South	30	10	10	10	51	34	40	7th					
1996–97	2. HNL South	36	25	5	6	73	25	80	1st					
1997–98	2. HNL South	32	21	5	6	52	19	68	1st	R2				
1998–99	2. HNL	36	17	8	11	60	34	59	5th					
1999–00	2. HNL	32	6	8	18	29	68	26	15th ↓	R1				
2000–01	3. HNL South	28	10	5	13	28	37	35	10th					
2001–02	3. HNL South	30	12	4	14	55	48	40	9th					
2002–03	3. HNL South	28	7	9	12	30	44	30	15th ↓					
2003–04	1. ŽNL S-D	26	13	3	10	46	31	42	5th					
2004–05	1. ŽNL S-D	32	12	10	10	52	41	46	7th					
2005–06	1. ŽNL S-D	36	15	9	12	52	40	54	9th					
2006–07	4. HNL South-A	28	12	6	10	46	34	42	2nd					
2007–08	4. HNL South-A	30	21	4	5	87	25	67	1st ↑				Antonio Milardović	21
2008–09	3. HNL South	34	23	8	3	79	20	77	1st ↑				Ante Žužul	28
2009–10	2. HNL	26	16	5	5	56	26	53	1st ↑	R1			Ante Žužul	12
2010–11	1. HNL	30	16	5	9	38	22	53	3rd				Bojan Golubović	6
2011–12	1. HNL	30	14	8	8	43	32	50	4th	R2	Europa League	QR3	Duje Čop	8
2012–13	1. HNL	33	15	7	11	49	37	52	5th	R2			Ante Rebić	10
2013–14	1. HNL	36	14	10	12	41	41	52	4th				Mate Bilić	9
2014–15	1. HNL	36	9	14	13	42	49	41	7th	RU	Europa League	PO	Sokol Cikalleshi	10
2015–16	1. HNL	36	10	16	10	28	29	46	6th				Dražen Bagarić	8
2016–17	1. HNL	36	3	9	24	12	52	18	10th ↓↓	SF			Sandro Ugrina	3
2017–18	3. HNL South	30	15	8	7	59	39	53	4th	R1			Pjero Antunović, Marin Bakić	11
2018–19	3. HNL South	30	9	11	10	51	44	38	13th	R1			Drago Gabrić	25
2019–20	3. HNL South	18	10	3	5	38	22	33	2nd	R1				
2020–21	3. HNL South	32	14	9	9	51	40	51	3rd	R1			Ivan Primorac	11
2021–22	3. HNL South	34	15	7	12	52	40	52	6th	R1			Krešimir Luetić	19
2022–23	3. NL South	30	7	6	17	27	52	27	15th	R2			Ante Žužul	5
2023–24	3. NL South	30	7	6	17	36	70	17^{(−10)}	16th ↓				Ante Žužul	9
2024–25	1. ŽNL S-D	26	4	3	19	28	72	15	13th				Antonio Bebić	9
2025–26	1. ŽNL S-D	26	0	2	24	15	119	–4^{(–6)}	14th ↓				Tino Buhovac	4

=== Key ===
- P = Played
- W = Games won
- D = Games drawn
- L = Games lost
- F = Goals for
- A = Goals against
- Pts = Points
- Pos = Final position
- 1. HNL = Croatian First League
- 2. HNL = Croatian Second League
- 3. HNL = Croatian Third League
- 4. HNL = Croatian Fourth League
- 1. ŽNL = First County League
- S-D = Split-Dalmatia
- R1 = Round 1
- R2 = Round 2
- QF = Quarter-finals
- SF = Semi-finals
- RU = Runners-up
- W = Winners

== European record ==
=== Summary ===
Competition	Pld	W	D	L	GF	GA	Last season played
Europa League	12	5	5	2	12	7	2014–15
Total	12	5	5	2	12	7	

Source: uefa.com, Last updated on 28 August 2014
Pld = Matches played; W = Matches won; D = Matches drawn; L = Matches lost; GF = Goals for; GA = Goals against

=== By result ===
Overall	Pld	W	D	L	GF	GA	GD
Home	6	4	2	0	9	2	+7
Away	6	1	3	2	3	5	−2
Total	12	5	5	2	12	7	+5

=== By season ===
Season	Competition	Round	Opponent	Home	Away	Agg
2011–12	UEFA Europa League	QR2	(Slovenia) Domžale	3–1	2–1	5–2
2011–12	UEFA Europa League	QR3	(England) Fulham	0–0	0–2	0–2
2014–15	UEFA Europa League	QR1	(Armenia) Mika	2–0	1–1	3–1
2014–15	UEFA Europa League	QR2	(Israel) Hapoel Be'er Sheva	2–1	0–0	2–1
2014–15	UEFA Europa League	QR3	(Ukraine) Chornomorets Odesa	2–0	0–0	2–0
2014–15	UEFA Europa League	PO	(Italy) Torino	0–0	0–1	0–1

== Historical list of managers ==
- (Socialist Federal Republic of Yugoslavia) Luka Kaliterna (1940–41), (1946–47), (1954–58)
- (Socialist Federal Republic of Yugoslavia) Frane Matošić (1959–61)
- (Socialist Federal Republic of Yugoslavia) Luka Kaliterna (1961–62)
- (Socialist Federal Republic of Yugoslavia) Frane Matošić (1963–64)
- (Socialist Federal Republic of Yugoslavia) Ivo Radovniković (1963–64)
- (Socialist Federal Republic of Yugoslavia) Ozren Nedoklan (1965–66)
- (Socialist Federal Republic of Yugoslavia) Luka Kaliterna (1966–67)
- (Socialist Federal Republic of Yugoslavia) Tomislav Ivić (1967–68)
- (Socialist Federal Republic of Yugoslavia) Ljubomir Kokeza (1968)
- (Socialist Federal Republic of Yugoslavia) Stanko Poklepović (1969)
- (Socialist Federal Republic of Yugoslavia) Ljubomir Kokeza (1970–71)
- (Socialist Federal Republic of Yugoslavia) Stanko Poklepović (1971–72)
- (Socialist Federal Republic of Yugoslavia) Lenko Grčić (1972–73)
- (Socialist Federal Republic of Yugoslavia) Zlatomir Obradov (1975)
- (Socialist Federal Republic of Yugoslavia) Zlatko Papec (1978–80)
- (Socialist Federal Republic of Yugoslavia) Vladimir Beara (1980–81)
- (Socialist Federal Republic of Yugoslavia) Zlatko Papec (1981–82)
- (Socialist Federal Republic of Yugoslavia) Vinko Begović (1986–87)
- (Socialist Federal Republic of Yugoslavia) Mićun Jovanić (1991)
- (Croatia) Vjeran Simunić (1999–00)
- (Croatia) Stipe Milardović (2007–08)
- (Croatia) Milo Nižetić (2008–09)
- (Croatia) Tonči Bašić (2009–10)
- (Croatia) Ivan Katalinić (2010–11)
- (Croatia) Tonči Bašić (2011–12)
- (Croatia) Zoran Vulić (2012–13)
- (Croatia) Goran Sablić (interim) (2013)
- (Croatia) Stanko Mršić (2013–14)
- (Croatia) Ivan Matić (2014)
- (Croatia) Zoran Vulić (2014–15)
- (Croatia) Goran Sablić (2015–16)
- (Croatia) Vjekoslav Lokica (2016–17)
- (Bosnia and Herzegovina) Bruno Akrapović (2017)
- (Croatia) Ivan Pudar (2017–2018)
- (Croatia) Armando Marenzi (2018–2020)
- (Bosnia and Herzegovina) Ivan Radeljić (2020–2022)
- (Croatia) Ivan Tomičić (Mar 2022-Sep 22)
- (Croatia) Damir Vučić (Sepp 2022-Feb 23)
- (Croatia) Ivan Čaić (Feb 2023-)
