= 2009–10 RNK Split season =

RNK Split
2009–10 season
- Chairman: Slaven Žužul
- Manager: Tonči Bašić
- Stadium: Park mladeži
- Druga HNL: 1st
- Croatian Cup: First round
- Top goalscorer: League: Ante Žužul (12); All: Ante Žužul (12)
- Highest home attendance: 3,000 vs Mosor, 29 May 2010
- Lowest home attendance: 300 vs Segesta, 12 September 2009
Home colours	Away colours

The 2009–10 was the 98th season in RNK Split’s history. After winning Treća HNL South in the previous season, they earned promotion to Druga HNL. RNK Split finished the season in 1st place in the Druga HNL and earned promotion to 2010–11 Prva HNL.

The club reached the first round of the 2009–10 Croatian Cup, where the team were beaten 2–0 by Slaven Belupo. Ante Žužul was the club's top goalscorer after scoring 12 goals, all of them in the league. At the end of the season, manager Tonči Bašić left the club after he was offered the place of assistant manager when the board brought Ivan Katalinić to replace him.

== First-team squad ==
As of 29 May 2010

Note: Flags indicate national team as defined under FIFA eligibility rules; some limited exceptions apply. Players may hold more than one non-FIFA nationality.

No.	Pos.	Nation	Player
—	GK	CRO	Andrija Vuković
—	GK	CRO	Danijel Zagorac
—	GK	CRO	Vedran Čović
—	DF	CRO	Goran Milović
—	DF	CRO	Ivica Pirić
—	DF	CRO	Goran Radnić
—	DF	CRO	Damir Rašić
—	DF	CRO	Petar Šimić
—	MF	CRO	Stipe Barač
—	MF	CRO	Ante Erceg

No.	Pos.	Nation	Player
—	MF	CRO	Juraj Grizelj
—	MF	CRO	Frane Lojić
—	MF	CRO	Tomislav Miljak
—	MF	CRO	Josip Serdarušić
—	MF	CRO	Ante Vitaić
—	MF	CRO	Frane Vitaić
—	MF	CRO	Ante Žužul (captain)
—	FW	CRO	Ante Ćapin
—	FW	CRO	Joško Parać
—	FW	CRO	Tedi Surać (on loan from Hajduk Split)

== Competitions ==
=== Overall ===
Competition	Started round	Final result	First match	Last Match
2009–10 Druga HNL	–	1st	22 August	29 May
2009–10 Croatian Cup	Preliminary round	First round	25 August	23 September

=== Druga HNL ===
==== Classification ====
Pos	Team	Pld	W	D	L	GF	GA	GD	Pts	Promotion or relegation
1	RNK Split (C, P)	26	16	5	5	56	26	+30	53	Promotion to Croatian First Football League (Note: Only RNK Split and Hrvatski Dragovoljac were granted a Prva HNL license for the Croatian First Football League.)
2	Pomorac	26	14	5	7	41	24	+17	47	
3	Hrvatski Dragovoljac (P)	26	11	9	6	35	23	+12	42	Promotion to Croatian First Football League
4	Lučko	26	12	6	8	38	28	+10	42	
5	Solin	26	10	10	6	29	22	+7	40	

Source: Druga HNL (in Croatian)
Rules for classification: 1) points; 2) goal difference; 3) number of goals scored.
(C) Champions; (P) Promoted

==== Results summary ====
Overall								Home						Away					
Pld	W	D	L	GF	GA	GD	Pts	W	D	L	GF	GA	GD	W	D	L	GF	GA	GD
26	16	5	5	56	26	+30	53	10	1	2	35	11	+24	6	4	3	21	15	+6

Last updated: 29 May 2010.
Source: Druga-HNL.com, Sportnet.hr

==== Results by round ====
Round	1	2	3	4	5	6	7	8	9	10	11	12	13	14	15	16	17	18	19	20	21	22	23	24	25	26
Ground	H	A	H	H	A	H	A	H	A	H	A	H	A	A	H	A	A	H	A	H	A	H	A	H	A	H
Result	W	L	D	W	W	W	W	W	D	L	D	W	D	W	W	D	W	W	L	W	W	W	W	W	L	L
Position	3	6	7	5	3	2	2	1	1	3	2	1	1	1	1	1	1	1	1	1	1	1	1	1	1	1

Source: Competitive matches
A = Away; H = Home; W = Win; D = Draw; L = Loss

== Matches ==
=== Druga HNL ===
Round	Date	Venue	Opponent	Score	Attendance	RNK Split Scorers	Report
1	22 Aug	H	Vinogradar	3 – 0	500	Barač, Surać, F. Vitaić	Sportnet.hr
2	29 Aug	A	Pomorac	2 – 4	300	Žužul (2)	Sportnet.hr
3	6 Sep	H	Rudeš	2 – 2	700	Gruica, Žužul	Sportnet.hr
4	12 Sep	H	Segesta	4 – 1	300	Serdarušić, Pirić, Parać, Žužul	Sportnet.hr
5	19 Sep	A	Moslavina	3 – 0	400	Barač (2), Parać	Sportnet.hr
6	27 Sep	H	Imotski	3 – 0	2,000	Žužul, F. Vitaić, Surać	Sportnet.hr
7	3 Oct	A	Suhopolje	1 – 0	1,000	Serdarušić	Sportnet.hr
8	10 Oct	H	Hrvatski Dragovoljac	2 – 0	1,000	Serdarušić, Parać	Sportnet.hr
9	18 Oct	A	Vukovar '91	1 – 1	150	F. Vitaić	Sportnet.hr
10	24 Oct	H	Solin	3 – 4	1,000	Milović, Žužul, Ćapin	Sportnet.hr
11	7 Nov	A	Junak	1 – 1	700	Surać	Sportnet.hr
12	15 Nov	H	Lučko	4 – 1	700	Serdarušić, Milović, Žužul, Surać	Sportnet.hr
13	21 Nov	A	Mosor	1 – 1	250	Parać	Sportnet.hr
14	28 Feb	A	Vinogradar	4 – 1	500	Žužul (2), A. Vitaić, Parać	Sportnet.hr
15	6 Mar	H	Pomorac	2 – 0	2,000	Grizelj, Parać	Sportnet.hr
16	16 Mar	A	Rudeš	1 – 1	300	Parać	Sportnet.hr
17	20 Mar	A	Segesta	1 – 0	400	Parać	Sportnet.hr
18	28 Mar	H	Moslavina	4 – 0	800	Žužul (2), Parać, Serdarušić	Sportnet.hr
19	11 Apr	A	Imotski	2 – 5	800	Serdarušić, Žužul	Sportnet.hr
20	17 Apr	H	Suhopolje	2 – 1	400	Parać, Šimić	Sportnet.hr
21	23 Apr	A	Hrvatski Dragovoljac	1 – 0	500	Rašić	Sportnet.hr
22	2 May	H	Vukovar '91	3 – 0	500	A. Vitaić, F. Vitaić, Milović	Sportnet.hr
23	8 May	A	Solin	3 – 0	600	F. Vitaić, Grizelj, Rašić	Sportnet.hr
24	15 May	H	Junak	2 – 0	500	Grizelj, A. Vitaić	Sportnet.hr
25	22 May	A	Lučko	0 – 1	300		Sportnet.hr
26	29 May	H	Mosor	1 – 2	3,000	Parać	Sportnet.hr

=== Croatian Cup ===
Round	Date	Venue	Opponent	Score	Attendance	RNK Split Scorers	Report
QR	25 Aug	A	Bjelovar	1 – 0	200	Surać	
R1	23 Sep	H	Slaven Belupo	0 – 2	2,000		Sportnet.hr

Last updated 29 May 2010
Sources: Druga-HNL.com, Sportnet.hr

== Player seasonal records ==
Competitive matches only. Updated to games played 29 May 2010.

=== Goalscorers ===
Rank	Name	League	Cup	Total
1	(Croatia) Ante Žužul	12	–	12
2	(Croatia) Joško Parać	11	–	11
3	(Croatia) Josip Serdarušić	6	–	6
4	(Croatia) Frane Vitaić	5	–	5
4	(Croatia) Tedi Surać	4	1	5
6	(Croatia) Stipe Barač	3	–	3
6	(Croatia) Juraj Grizelj	3	–	3
6	(Croatia) Goran Milović	3	–	3
6	(Croatia) Ante Vitaić	3	–	3
10	(Croatia) Damir Rašić	2	–	2
11	(Croatia) Ante Ćapin	1	–	1
11	(Croatia) Goran Gruica	1	–	1
11	(Croatia) Ivica Pirić	1	–	1
11	(Croatia) Petar Šimić	1	–	1
	TOTALS	56	1	57

Source: Competitive matches

=== Squad statistics ===
Position	Player	League		Discipline	
Position	Player	Apps	Goals	Yellow card	Red card
DF	(Croatia) Goran Radnić	25	0	2	0
DF	(Croatia) Goran Milović	24	0	5	0
MF	(Croatia) Ante Žužul	25	12	3	0
FW	(Croatia) Joško Parać	23	11	5	1
DF	(Croatia) Petar Šimić	19	1	9	1
MF	(Croatia) Josip Serdarušić	18	6	0	0
DF	(Croatia) Ivica Pirić	18	1	3	0
MF	(Croatia) Frane Vitaić	20	5	1	1
GK	(Croatia) Andrija Vuković	13	0	2	0
DF	(Croatia) Goran Gruica	17	1	0	0
DF	(Croatia) Juraj Grizelj	17	3	2	0
MF	(Croatia) Stipe Barač	17	3	7	0
DF	(Croatia) Damir Rašić	13	2	2	1
MF	(Croatia) Ante Vitaić	13	3	1	0
FW	(Croatia) Tedi Surać	15	4	1	0
DF	(Croatia) Frane Lojić	13	0	2	0
GK	(Croatia) Danijel Zagorac	10	0	3	0
MF	(Croatia) Tomislav Miljak	16	0	3	0
FW	(Croatia) Ante Ćapin	12	1	1	0
GK	(Croatia) Vedran Čović	3	0	0	0
MF	(Croatia) Ante Erceg	6	0	1	0
DF	(Croatia) Marko Jurić	4	0	2	0
MF	(Croatia) Dalibor Mandarić	5	0	0	0
DF	(Croatia) Ante Puljiz	6	0	0	0
MF	(Croatia) Ivan Muslim	4	0	0	0
FW	(Croatia) Stjepan Krezo	1	0	1	0
FW	(Croatia) Branimir Borozan	3	0	0	0
MF	(Croatia) Dario Sablić	1	0	0	0

Sources: Druga-HNL.com
