= 2008–09 Croatian Second Football League =

Druga HNL
- Season: 2008–09
- Champions: Istra 1961
- Promoted: Istra 1961; Karlovac; Lokomotiva; Međimurje
- Relegated: Trogir
- Matches: 240
- Goals: 612 (2.55 per match)
- Top goalscorer: Marijan Vuka (19)

The 2008–09 Druga HNL (also known as 2. HNL) season was the 18th season of Croatia's second level football since its establishment in 1992. Croatia Sesvete were league champions and were promoted to Prva HNL at the end of the previous season.

The league featured 16 clubs, playing in a double round robin league system. The season started on 23 August 2008 and ended on 30 May 2009.

== Changes from last season ==
The following clubs have been promoted or relegated at the end of the 2007–08 season:

=== From 2. HNL ===
Promoted to 1. HNL

- Croatia Sesvete (winners of 2007–08 Druga HNL)

Relegated to 3. HNL

- Marsonia (13th place)
- Kamen Ingrad (14th place)
- Vukovar '91 (15th place)
- Belišće (16th place)

=== To 2. HNL ===
Relegated from 1. HNL

- Međimurje (12th place)

Promoted from 3. HNL

- Suhopolje (3. HNL East winners)
- Junak Sinj (3. HNL South third place)^{1}
- Karlovac (3. HNL West winners)
- Lokomotiva (3. HNL West runners-up)^{2}

=== Notes ===
- ^{1} Hrvace had won the 3. HNL South but didn't obtain a license for competing in Druga HNL, while second-placed team Zagora didn't even requested one. Because of this, third-placed Junak Sinj qualified automatically for promotion.
- ^{2} Lokomotiva, as the 3. HNL West runners-up, qualified for the two-legged promotion playoff, which would have taken place between second-placed teams of 3. HNL East and West Division. As the 3. HNL East runners-up Grafičar Vodovod didn't get the license for Druga HNL, third-placed Virovitica qualified for the playoff. However, their board of directors decided to withdraw five days before the first match. Because of this, Lokomotiva were automatically promoted to Druga HNL.

In a two-legged promotion/relegation playoff between Inter Zaprešić (as 11th placed 1. HNL team) and Hrvatski Dragovoljac (as 2. HNL runners-up), the former kept their Prva HNL status by beating Hrvatski Dragovoljac with 2–0 on aggregate (2–0, 0–0).

== Clubs ==
Locations of teams in 2008–09 Druga HNL

Club	City	Stadium	2007–08 result	Capacity
Hrvatski Dragovoljac	Zagreb	NŠC Stjepan Spajić	2nd in 2.HNL	5,000
Imotski	Imotski	Gospin dolac	10th in 2.HNL	4,000
Istra 1961	Pula	Veruda	3rd in 2.HNL	3,500
Junak Sinj	Sinj	Gradski stadion Sinj	3rd in 3.HNL South	3,096
Karlovac	Karlovac	Branko Čavlović-Čavlek	1st in 3.HNL West	8,000
Lokomotiva	Zagreb	ŠRC Hitrec-Kacijan	2nd in 3.HNL West	1,000
Međimurje	Čakovec	Stadion SRC Mladost	12th in 1.HNL	8,000
Moslavina	Kutina	Gradski stadion u Kutini	9th in 2.HNL	2,000
Mosor	Žrnovnica	Stadion Pricviće	11th in 2.HNL	2,000
Pomorac	Kostrena	Stadion Žuknica	4th in 2.HNL	3,000
Segesta	Sisak	Gradski stadion Sisak	7th in 2.HNL	8,000
Slavonac CO	Stari Perkovci	Igralište Slavonca	6th in 2.HNL	1,000
Solin	Solin	Stadion pokraj Jadra	12th in 2.HNL	4,000
Suhopolje	Suhopolje	Stadion Park	1st in 3.HNL East	8,000
Trogir	Trogir	Gradski stadion Sinj	8th in 2.HNL	3,096
Vinogradar	Jastrebarsko	Stadion Mladina	5th in 2.HNL	2,000

== League table ==
Pos	Team	Pld	W	D	L	GF	GA	GD	Pts	Promotion or relegation
1	Istra 1961 (C, P)	30	18	6	6	46	20	+26	60	Promotion to Croatian First Football League
2	Karlovac (P)	30	18	5	7	50	24	+26	59	Promotion to Croatian First Football League
3	Lokomotiva (P)	30	18	5	7	50	30	+20	59	Promotion to Croatian First Football League
4	Slavonac CO (Note: Slavonac CO had to step back from promotion after they were not able to find a satisfiable ground, and were demoted to the 1st county league; therefore Međimurje were promoted directly and Hrvatski Dragovoljac entered the playoff, while Moslavina were not relegated.) (R)	30	15	12	3	39	18	+21	57	Relegation to county leagues
5	Međimurje (P)	30	16	2	12	61	34	+27	50	Promotion to Croatian First Football League
6	Hrvatski Dragovoljac	30	13	10	7	38	36	+2	49	Qualification to promotion play-offs
7	Solin	30	14	5	11	37	31	+6	47	
8	Vinogradar	30	11	7	12	40	50	−10	40	
9	Imotski	30	10	4	16	31	45	−14	34	
10	Suhopolje	30	8	9	13	33	37	−4	33	
11	Segesta	30	8	9	13	33	47	−14	33	
12	Junak	30	9	6	15	35	51	−16	33	
13	Pomorac	30	9	5	16	29	45	−16	32	
14	Mosor	30	8	6	16	25	44	−19	30	
15	Moslavina	30	7	7	16	33	51	−18	28	
16	Trogir (R)	30	3	12	15	32	49	−17	21	Relegation to Croatian Third Football League

Source: Sportnet.hr (in Croatian)
Rules for classification: 1) points; 2) goal difference; 3) number of goals scored.
(C) Champions; (P) Promoted; (R) Relegated

== Results ==
Home \ Away	HRD	IMO	IST	JUN	KAR	LOK	MEĐ	MSL	MSR	POM	SEG	SLV	SOL	SUH	TRO	VIN
Hrvatski Dragovoljac		0–2	1–0	1–1	1–0	2–1	2–5	0–0	0–0	3–1	1–1	1–1	2–1	2–1	2–1	1–0
Imotski	1–0		0–1	2–0	0–1	0–2	2–0	2–1	2–0	2–3	2–0	0–1	0–1	2–1	1–1	2–0
Istra 1961	2–0	2–1		2–0	2–0	1–2	1–0	3–0	5–0	2–0	1–0	1–0	1–0	2–0	2–2	5–0
Junak	3–1	1–0	0–2		0–2	2–1	0–1	1–1	0–1	3–0	1–3	1–1	1–3	2–1	1–1	3–0
Karlovac	0–1	3–2	4–2	2–1		1–1	1–0	2–0	6–0	2–1	3–0	1–2	0–0	1–0	2–0	2–0
Lokomotiva	0–0	2–0	0–0	4–0	3–0		2–1	3–2	2–1	2–0	2–0	0–0	4–2	3–1	3–2	1–0
Međimurje	1–2	4–0	2–0	9–1	1–2	6–1		4–1	3–1	0–1	3–1	2–0	0–1	3–1	2–0	3–0
Moslavina	1–2	4–0	1–1	0–2	0–4	0–2	3–1		2–1	2–1	4–2	0–0	1–0	2–0	1–1	2–2
Mosor	1–1	4–1	1–0	1–0	0–1	1–4	1–2	1–0		2–0	1–0	0–0	0–3	0–1	0–0	0–1
Pomorac	1–3	1–0	0–1	2–3	0–0	0–1	1–1	3–0	2–1		1–0	2–1	1–0	0–1	2–1	3–3
Segesta	2–2	2–2	0–1	2–1	1–5	3–2	2–2	1–0	1–3	1–1		0–0	2–0	0–0	1–0	1–1
Slavonac CO	0–0	2–2	0–0	1–0	2–1	2–0	3–0	2–0	2–1	3–0	3–3		2–0	0–0	3–0	3–1
Solin	2–1	3–0	0–1	2–4	2–1	0–0	1–0	0–0	2–1	3–1	1–0	0–1		4–0	1–0	1–0
Suhopolje	1–2	4–1	1–1	2–0	1–1	1–0	0–2	4–2	1–1	2–0	0–1	1–1	1–1		0–0	6–0
Trogir	2–2	0–1	3–3	2–2	1–2	1–0	1–2	4–2	0–0	1–0	2–3	0–1	2–2	1–1		1–2
Vinogradar	4–2	1–1	2–1	1–1	0–0	1–2	2–1	2–1	2–1	1–1	2–0	1–2	4–1	2–0	5–2	

Source: Sportnet.hr (in Croatian)
Legend: Blue = home team win; Yellow = draw; Red = away team win.

== Top goalscorers ==
The top scorers in the 2008–09 Druga HNL season were:

Rank	Name	Club	Goals	Apps	Minutes played
1	(Croatia) Marijan Vuka	Međimurje	19	27	2072
2	(Croatia) Denis Ljuta	Solin	13	28	2291
2	(Croatia) Romano Obilinović	Imotski	13	28	2452
4	(Croatia) Zoran Zekić	Segesta, Moslavina	11	24	1729
4	(Bosnia and Herzegovina) Bojan Golubović	Slavonac CO	11	24	1833
4	(Brazil) Pinheiro	Vinogradar	11	25	2090
4	(Croatia) Ivica Žuljević	Međimurje	11	29	2451
8	(Croatia) Ivan Lišnić	Karlovac	10	18	1301
9	(Brazil) Eliomar	Međimurje	9	24	1964
9	(Croatia) Hrvoje Mišić	Slavonac CO	9	28	2396

== See also ==
- 2008–09 Prva HNL
- 2008–09 Croatian Cup
