= 2007–08 in Croatian football =

First Division champions
- Dinamo Zagreb (10th title)

Second Division champions
- Croatia Sesvete

Third Division champions
- Suhopolje (East); Hrvace (South); Karlovac (West)

Croatian Cup winners
- Dinamo Zagreb (9th title)

Teams in Europe
- Dinamo Zagreb, Hajduk Split, Slaven Belupo, NK Zagreb

Croatia national team
- UEFA Euro 2008 qualifying; UEFA Euro 2008

The following article presents a summary of the 2007–08 association football season in Croatia, which was the 17th season of competitive football in the country.

== League competitions ==
=== Croatian First Division ===
| Pos | Team | Pld | W | D | L | GF | GA | GD | Pts | Qualification or relegation |
|---|---|---|---|---|---|---|---|---|---|---|
| 1 | Dinamo Zagreb (C) | 33 | 26 | 4 | 3 | 91 | 34 | +57 | 82 | Qualification to Champions League first qualifying round |
| 2 | Slaven Belupo | 33 | 16 | 6 | 11 | 45 | 29 | +16 | 54 | Qualification to UEFA Cup first qualifying round (Note: Hajduk Split qualified for the UEFA Cup as a runner-up of the 2007–08 Croatian Football Cup.) |
| 3 | Osijek | 33 | 16 | 6 | 11 | 43 | 34 | +9 | 54 | |
| 4 | Rijeka | 33 | 14 | 11 | 8 | 53 | 41 | +12 | 53 | Qualification to Intertoto Cup first round |
| 5 | Hajduk Split | 33 | 14 | 10 | 9 | 57 | 41 | +16 | 52 | Qualification to UEFA Cup first qualifying round |
| 6 | NK Zagreb | 33 | 11 | 11 | 11 | 51 | 40 | +11 | 44 | |
| 7 | Varteks | 33 | 11 | 7 | 15 | 46 | 53 | −7 | 40 | |
| 8 | Cibalia | 33 | 11 | 7 | 15 | 40 | 48 | −8 | 40 | |
| 9 | Zadar | 33 | 11 | 7 | 15 | 49 | 61 | −12 | 40 | |
| 10 | Šibenik | 33 | 9 | 12 | 12 | 34 | 52 | −18 | 39 | |
| 11 | Inter Zaprešić (O) | 33 | 8 | 9 | 16 | 27 | 59 | −32 | 33 | Qualification to relegation play-off |
| 12 | Međimurje (R) | 33 | 3 | 6 | 24 | 37 | 81 | −44 | 15 | Relegation to Croatian Second Football League |

Source: Sportnet.hr
Rules for classification: 1st points; 2nd goal difference; 3rd goals scored
For deciding champions, qualification for the UEFA Cup and relegation: 1st points; 2nd head-to-head points; 3rd head-to-head goal difference; 4th head-to-head away goals scored
(C) Champions; (O) Play-off winners; (R) Relegated

=== Croatian Second Division ===
| Pos | Team | Pld | W | D | L | GF | GA | GD | Pts | Promotion or relegation |
|---|---|---|---|---|---|---|---|---|---|---|
| 1 | Croatia Sesvete (C, P) | 30 | 20 | 6 | 4 | 67 | 25 | +42 | 66 | Promotion to Croatian First Football League |
| 2 | Hrvatski Dragovoljac | 30 | 19 | 7 | 4 | 60 | 28 | +32 | 64 | Qualification to promotion play-off |
| 3 | Istra 1961 | 30 | 17 | 7 | 6 | 42 | 14 | +28 | 58 | |
| 4 | Pomorac | 30 | 14 | 7 | 9 | 42 | 28 | +14 | 49 | |
| 5 | Vinogradar | 30 | 12 | 8 | 10 | 42 | 43 | −1 | 44 | |
| 6 | Slavonac CO | 30 | 14 | 2 | 14 | 44 | 51 | −7 | 44 | |
| 7 | Segesta | 30 | 11 | 10 | 9 | 39 | 37 | +2 | 43 | |
| 8 | Trogir | 30 | 12 | 6 | 12 | 40 | 37 | +3 | 42 | |
| 9 | Moslavina | 30 | 11 | 8 | 11 | 51 | 42 | +9 | 41 | |
| 10 | Imotski | 30 | 11 | 7 | 12 | 49 | 53 | −4 | 40 | |
| 11 | Mosor | 30 | 10 | 8 | 12 | 27 | 42 | −15 | 38 | |
| 12 | Solin | 30 | 10 | 7 | 13 | 46 | 48 | −2 | 37 | |
| 13 | Marsonia (R) | 30 | 8 | 7 | 15 | 34 | 58 | −24 | 31 | Relegation to Croatian Third Football League |
| 14 | Kamen Ingrad (R) | 30 | 7 | 7 | 16 | 26 | 49 | −23 | 28 | Relegation to Croatian Third Football League |
| 15 | Vukovar '91 (R) | 30 | 6 | 6 | 18 | 29 | 53 | −24 | 24 | Relegation to Croatian Third Football League |
| 16 | Belišće (R) | 30 | 3 | 7 | 20 | 23 | 53 | −30 | 16 | Relegation to Croatian Third Football League |

Source: rsssf.org
Rules for classification: 1) points; 2) goal difference; 3) number of goals scored.
(C) Champions; (P) Promoted; (R) Relegated

== Other honours ==
| Competition | Winner |
|---|---|
| Croatian Cup | Dinamo Zagreb |
| Third Division East | Suhopolje |
| Third Division West | Karlovac |
| Third Division South | Hrvace |
