= 2009–10 Croatian Second Football League =

Druga HNL
- Season: 2009–10
- Champions: RNK Split
- Promoted: RNK Split (1st); Hrvatski Dragovoljac (3rd)
- Relegated: Moslavina (13th); Segesta (14th)
- Matches: 182
- Goals: 472 (2.59 per match)
- Top goalscorer: Romano Obilinović (17)

The 2009–10 Druga HNL (also known as 2. HNL) was the 19th season of Croatia's second level football competition since its establishment in 1992. Istra 1961 were league champions and were promoted to Prva HNL at the end of the previous season.

The league featured 14 clubs, playing in a double round robin league system. The season started on 22 August 2009 and ended on 29 May 2010.

== Changes from last season ==
The following clubs have been promoted or relegated at the end of the 2008–09 season:

=== From 2. HNL ===
Promoted to 1. HNL

- Istra 1961 (winners of 2008–09 2. HNL)
- Karlovac (runners-up)
- Lokomotiva (3rd placed team)
- Međimurje (5th placed team)^{1}

Relegated to 3. HNL

- Trogir (last-placed team)^{2}

=== To 2. HNL ===
Relegated from 1. HNL

- None^{3}

Promoted from 3. HNL

- Lučko (3. HNL West runners-up)
- Rudeš (3. HNL West winners)
- RNK Split (3. HNL South winners)
- Vukovar '91 (3. HNL East fourth place)

=== Notes ===
- ^{1} Slavonac CO had finished fourth, but had to step back from promotion after they were unable to find a suitable ground for hosting Prva HNL matches. Because of this, fifth-placed Međimurje qualified automatically for promotion and sixth-placed Hrvatski Dragovoljac qualified for the two-legged promotion playoff against last placed Prva HNL team.
- ^{2} Moslavina finished 15th and also qualified for relegation, but since Slavonac CO was punished for first agreeing to enter Prva HNL and then stepping back from promotion by direct expulsion to 3.HNL, Trogir and Slavonac were the two teams relegated and Moslavina were allowed to stay in 2. HNL.
- ^{3} In a two-legged promotion/relegation playoff between Croatia Sesvete (as 12th placed 1.HNL team) and Hrvatski Dragovoljac (as 6th placed 2. HNL team), the former kept their Prva HNL status by beating Hrvatski Dragovoljac with 2–1 on aggregate (0–0, 2–1) on 14 June 2009.

== Clubs ==
Locations of teams in 2009–10 Druga HNL

Club	City / Town	Stadium	2008–09 result	Capacity
Hrvatski Dragovoljac	Zagreb	Stadion NŠC Stjepan Spajić	6th in 2. HNL	5,000
Imotski	Imotski	Stadion Gospin dolac	9th in 2. HNL	4,000
Junak Sinj	Sinj	Gradski stadion Sinj	12th in 2. HNL	3,000
Lučko	Zagreb	Stadion Lučko	2nd in 3.HNL West	1,500
Moslavina	Kutina	Gradski stadion u Kutini	15th in 2. HNL	2,000
Mosor	Žrnovnica	Stadion Pricvić	14th in 2. HNL	2,000
Pomorac	Kostrena	Stadion Žuknica	13th in 2. HNL	3,000
Rudeš	Zagreb	Stadion u Sigetu	1st in 3.HNL West	1,000
Segesta	Sisak	Gradski stadion Sisak	11th in 2. HNL	8,000
Solin	Solin	Stadion pokraj Jadra	7th in 2. HNL	4,000
RNK Split	Split	Stadion Park mladeži	1st in 3.HNL South	8,000
Suhopolje	Suhopolje	Stadion Park	10th in 2. HNL	8,000
Vinogradar	Jastrebarsko	Stadion Mladina	8th in 2. HNL	2,000
Vukovar '91	Vukovar	Gradski stadion u Borovu naselju	4th in 3.HNL East	8,000

(As of 9 July 2009, two out of the 16 clubs which were supposed to take part in 2. HNL failed to meet UEFA competition requirements and were refused licences. These were Zmaj Makarska and NK Đakovo.)

== League table ==
Pos	Team	Pld	W	D	L	GF	GA	GD	Pts	Promotion or relegation
1	RNK Split (C, P)	26	16	5	5	56	26	+30	53	Promotion to Croatian First Football League (Note: Only RNK Split and Hrvatski Dragovoljac were granted a Prva HNL license for the Croatian First Football League.)
2	Pomorac	26	14	5	7	41	24	+17	47	
3	Hrvatski Dragovoljac (P)	26	11	9	6	35	23	+12	42	Promotion to Croatian First Football League
4	Lučko	26	12	6	8	38	28	+10	42	
5	Solin	26	10	10	6	29	22	+7	40	
6	Vinogradar	26	11	4	11	38	37	+1	37	
7	Rudeš	26	10	7	9	38	38	0	37	
8	Imotski	26	10	5	11	29	31	−2	35	
9	Junak	26	10	4	12	40	49	−9	34	
10	Mosor	26	9	6	11	26	34	−8	33	
11	Suhopolje	26	8	7	11	29	31	−2	31	
12	Vukovar '91	26	7	10	9	31	39	−8	31	
13	Moslavina (R)	26	6	6	14	25	44	−19	24	Relegation to Croatian Third Football League
14	Segesta (R)	26	4	4	18	17	46	−29	16	Relegation to Croatian Third Football League

Source: Druga HNL (in Croatian)
Rules for classification: 1) points; 2) goal difference; 3) number of goals scored.
(C) Champions; (P) Promoted; (R) Relegated

== Results ==
Home \ Away	HRD	IMO	JUN	LUČ	MSL	MSR	POM	RUD	SEG	SOL	SPL	SUH	VIN	VUK
Hrvatski Dragovoljac		5–0	1–1	1–2	4–1	2–0	2–2	1–0	1–0	0–0	0–1	2–1	1–0	4–1
Imotski	0–2		3–0	1–2	3–4	2–1	1–1	0–0	2–0	1–2	5–2	3–2	1–0	3–3
Junak	1–2	2–0		1–0	3–0	2–0	0–1	3–1	3–0	2–0	1–1	1–2	1–0	2–1
Lučko	5–1	0–1	2–2		2–0	0–0	3–1	1–1	4–0	1–1	1–0	2–0	1–1	0–1
Moslavina	2–2	0–1	1–1	0–2		1–2	3–1	1–3	2–0	0–0	0–3	3–2	0–1	3–1
Mosor	0–2	0–2	1–1	3–0	2–1		0–2	3–3	1–0	1–1	1–1	1–1	0–1	2–1
Pomorac	1–1	4–1	1–0	0–1	3–0	3–0		2–0	2–1	2–0	4–2	1–0	3–1	0–1
Rudeš	0–0	6–2	2–0	1–3	1–0	1–0	0–3		3–0	2–0	1–1	1–0	2–6	1–1
Segesta	1–0	0–0	3–0	0–1	2–1	0–2	0–2	1–1		1–1	0–1	1–1	1–0	1–3
Solin	0–0	1–1	2–0	2–1	0–0	3–0	0–0	2–1	3–0		0–3	1–0	2–0	3–0
RNK Split	2–0	3–0	2–0	4–1	4–0	1–2	2–0	2–2	4–1	3–4		2–1	3–0	3–0
Suhopolje	0–0	3–1	3–1	2–2	0–0	0–1	1–0	1–0	3–2	1–0	0–1		1–1	2–1
Vinogradar	1–0	1–3	2–0	3–1	1–2	3–2	3–1	3–1	3–1	0–0	1–4	2–1		3–3
Vukovar '91	1–1	3–2	0–1	0–0	0–0	0–0	1–1	1–2	2–1	2–1	1–1	1–1	2–1	

Source: Druga HNL (in Croatian)
Legend: Blue = home team win; Yellow = draw; Red = away team win.

== Top goalscorers ==
The top scorers in the 2009–10 Druga HNL season were:

Rank	Name	Club	Goals	Apps	Minutes played
1	(Croatia) Romano Obilinović	Imotski	17	20	
2	(Croatia) Igor Raić	Rudeš	13	23	1779
3	(Croatia) Ante Žužul	RNK Split	12	25	2088
4	(Croatia) Tin Lovreković	Vinogradar	11	23	1447
4	(Croatia) Joško Parać	RNK Split	11	23	1850
4	(Croatia) Danijel Spasić	Vukovar '91	11	24	2126
7	(Croatia) Tonči Radovniković	Mosor	8	22	1898
7	(Croatia) Ivor Weitzer	Pomorac	8	25	2083
9	(Croatia) Mario Midenjak	Junak	7	20	1498
9	(Croatia) Denis Ljuta	Solin	7	23	1733
9	(Croatia) Željko Sablić	Solin	7	25	1763
9	(Croatia) Josip Fuček	Lučko	7	23	1789
9	(Croatia) Danko Cerovečki	Moslavina	7	24	2140

== See also ==
- 2009–10 Croatian First Football League
- 2009–10 Croatian Football Cup
