= 2007–08 Croatian Second Football League =

Druga HNL
- Season: 2007–08
- Champions: Croatia Sesvete
- Promoted: Croatia Sesvete
- Relegated: Marsonia; Kamen Ingrad; Vukovar '91; Belišće
- Matches: 240
- Goals: 661 (2.75 per match)
- Top goalscorer: Marijan Maruna (19)

The 2007–08 Druga HNL season was the 17th since its establishment. The first placed team were Croatia sesvete and the last four clubs were relegated to Treća HNL.

== Changes from last season ==
The following clubs have been promoted or relegated at the end of the 2006–07 season:

=== From 2. HNL ===
Promoted to 1. HNL

- Inter Zaprešić (winners of 2006–07 Druga HNL)
- Zadar (2nd place)^{1}

Relegated to 3. HNL

- Naftaš HAŠK (10th place)^{2}
- Koprivnica (14th place)
- Bjelovar (15th place)
- Čakovec (16th place)

=== To 2. HNL ===
Relegated from 1. HNL

- Pula (11th place)
- Kamen Ingrad (12th place)

Promoted from 3. HNL

- Slavonac CO (3. HNL East winners)
- Trogir (3. HNL South winners)
- Vinogradar (3. HNL West winners)
- Segesta (3. HNL West runners-up)^{3}

=== Notes ===
- ^{1} In a two-legged promotion/relegation playoff between Zadar (as 2. HNL runners-up) and Pula (as 11th placed 1. HNL team), the former earned promotion to Prva HNL by beating Pula with 5–2 on aggregate.
- ^{2} Naftaš HAŠK didn't obtain a licence for competing in Druga HNL, and because of that 13th placed Moslavina were allowed to stay in the 2. HNL.
- ^{3} Segesta, as the 3. HNL West runners-up, qualified for the two-legged promotion playoff, which takes place between second-placed teams of 3. HNL East and West Division. In the playoff, they defeated 3. HNL East runners-up Suhopolje with an aggregate score 6–2.

== Clubs ==
Locations of teams in 2007–08 Druga HNL

Club	City	Stadium	2006–07 result	Capacity
Belišće	Belišće	Gradski stadion	7th in 2. HNL	3,000
Croatia Sesvete	Zagreb	Stadion ŠRC Sesvete	3rd in 2. HNL	3,500
Hrvatski Dragovoljac	Zagreb	NŠC Stjepan Spajić	4th in 2. HNL	5,000
Imotski	Imotski	Gospin dolac	6th in 2. HNL	4,000
Istra 1961	Pula	Veruda	11th in 1. HNL	3,500
Kamen Ingrad	Velika	Stadion Kamen Ingrad	12th in 1. HNL	8,000
Marsonia	Slavonski Brod	Gradski stadion uz Savu	12th in 2. HNL	10,000
Moslavina	Kutina	Gradski stadion u Kutini	13th in 2. HNL	2,000
Mosor	Žrnovnica	Pricviće	11th in 2. HNL	2,000
Pomorac	Kostrena	Žuknica	8th in 2. HNL	3,000
Segesta	Sisak	Gradski stadion Sisak	2nd in 3. HNL West	8,000
Slavonac CO	Stari Perkovci	Igralište Slavonca	1st in 3. HNL East	1,000
Solin	Solin	Stadion pokraj Jadra	5th in 2. HNL	4,000
Trogir	Trogir	Poljud	1st in 3. HNL South	35,000
Vinogradar	Jastrebarsko	Stadion Mladina	1st in 3. HNL West	2,000
Vukovar '91	Vukovar	Gradski stadion u Borovu naselju	9th in 2. HNL	6,000

== League table ==
Pos	Team	Pld	W	D	L	GF	GA	GD	Pts	Promotion or relegation
1	Croatia Sesvete (C, P)	30	20	6	4	67	25	+42	66	Promotion to Croatian First Football League
2	Hrvatski Dragovoljac	30	19	7	4	60	28	+32	64	Qualification to promotion play-off
3	Istra 1961	30	17	7	6	42	14	+28	58	
4	Pomorac	30	14	7	9	42	28	+14	49	
5	Vinogradar	30	12	8	10	42	43	−1	44	
6	Slavonac CO	30	14	2	14	44	51	−7	44	
7	Segesta	30	11	10	9	39	37	+2	43	
8	Trogir	30	12	6	12	40	37	+3	42	
9	Moslavina	30	11	8	11	51	42	+9	41	
10	Imotski	30	11	7	12	49	53	−4	40	
11	Mosor	30	10	8	12	27	42	−15	38	
12	Solin	30	10	7	13	46	48	−2	37	
13	Marsonia (R)	30	8	7	15	34	58	−24	31	Relegation to Croatian Third Football League
14	Kamen Ingrad (R)	30	7	7	16	26	49	−23	28	Relegation to Croatian Third Football League
15	Vukovar '91 (R)	30	6	6	18	29	53	−24	24	Relegation to Croatian Third Football League
16	Belišće (R)	30	3	7	20	23	53	−30	16	Relegation to Croatian Third Football League

Source: rsssf.org
Rules for classification: 1) points; 2) goal difference; 3) number of goals scored.
(C) Champions; (P) Promoted; (R) Relegated

== Results ==
Home \ Away	BEL	CRS	HRD	IMO	IST	KAM	MAR	MSL	MSR	POM	SEG	SLV	SOL	TRO	VIN	VUK
Belišće		0–0	1–2	2–3	0–3	1–1	0–1	0–0	0–3	1–2	0–1	0–1	1–1	3–1	0–0	2–0
Croatia Sesvete	4–1		0–4	4–0	2–1	5–1	2–0	4–0	1–1	2–0	3–0	2–1	4–0	0–0	5–1	3–0
Hrvatski Dragovoljac	2–0	0–1		2–2	1–0	3–0	2–1	2–1	3–0	1–0	0–1	3–0	2–1	2–0	2–2	3–1
Imotski	3–2	0–2	1–4		0–0	3–1	1–1	3–1	4–0	0–4	0–2	6–1	2–0	2–0	4–1	3–0
Istra 1961	2–1	0–0	1–0	2–1		0–0	6–0	2–0	0–0	0–1	5–1	0–1	2–1	2–0	4–0	1–0
Kamen Ingrad	3–1	1–2	2–1	2–0	1–2		0–0	4–3	0–2	1–1	0–0	0–1	1–0	2–2	0–1	2–1
Marsonia	1–1	1–3	2–4	3–3	0–2	0–1		4–3	1–1	3–2	1–0	3–0	2–2	1–0	2–1	1–0
Moslavina	5–0	3–3	1–2	1–0	0–0	3–0	2–1		5–1	1–1	2–1	6–2	4–1	3–2	3–0	0–0
Mosor	1–0	0–4	1–1	2–2	0–0	1–0	2–1	1–2		0–1	2–1	1–0	2–1	0–2	2–3	1–1
Pomorac	3–1	2–2	3–3	0–0	0–1	3–0	2–0	1–0	2–0		1–1	0–2	1–0	1–1	2–0	4–0
Segesta	2–0	2–1	0–0	5–1	0–1	1–1	4–1	0–0	0–0	1–0		1–2	1–1	2–2	1–0	4–1
Slavonac CO	1–0	0–1	2–4	5–1	0–0	3–1	3–1	2–0	4–0	1–2	2–2		1–2	3–2	1–0	2–0
Solin	1–3	1–4	0–0	1–1	2–0	3–0	3–0	2–0	0–1	2–0	7–1	3–1		2–1	4–5	1–1
Trogir	2–0	1–0	2–2	1–0	0–2	1–0	4–1	1–0	0–2	0–2	2–1	3–0	4–0		0–2	4–1
Vinogradar	3–1	2–0	1–2	2–0	2–1	3–0	1–1	1–1	1–0	2–0	1–1	3–1	2–2	1–1		1–1
Vukovar '91	1–1	2–3	1–3	2–3	0–2	2–1	3–0	1–1	2–0	2–1	0–2	4–1	1–2	0–1	1–0	

Source: rsssf.org
Legend: Blue = home team win; Yellow = draw; Red = away team win.

== Top scorers ==
Rank	Name	Club	Goals
1	(Croatia) Marijan Maruna	Moslavina	19
2	(Croatia) Romano Obilinović	Imotski	14
3	(Croatia) Željko Sablić	Vinogradar	13
4	(Croatia) Ivan Rodić	Imotski	12
4	(Croatia) Darko Čordaš	Trogir, Vinogradar	12
4	(Croatia) Joško Parać	Trogir	12
7	(Croatia) Ivica Karabogdan	Croatia Sesvete	11
7	(Croatia) Mladen Križanović	Hrvatski Dragovoljac	11
7	(Croatia) Vladimir Petrović	Croatia Sesvete	11

== See also ==
- 2007–08 Prva HNL
- 2007–08 Croatian Cup
