= 1992 Croatian Second Football League =

Druga HNL
- Season: 1992
- Champions: NK Radnik
- Promoted: NK Radnik, NK Pazinka, HNK Segesta and NK Belišće
- Matches played: 116
- Goals scored: 294 (2.53 per match)
- Biggest home win: MAR Solin 5-0 NK Jadran Ploce
- Highest scoring: NK Slaven Konavle 6-3 NK Junak Sinj

The 1992 Croatian Second Football League was the first season of second-division football in Croatia.

The league consisted of 24 teams organized into four geographic groups: Jug (South, 8 teams), Sjever (North, 7 teams), Zapad (West, 4 teams), and Istok (East, 5 teams). Before the competition started, Metalac Sisak were excluded from the north region, and the east region did not play any games due to the war. The winners of each group played in a three-team playoff to determine the champion, won by NK Radnik Velika Gorica.

The league consisted of teams from the third and fourth Yugoslavian division who were not admitted to the 1992 Croatian First Football League.

== West Group "Zapad" ==
Pos	Team	Pld	W	D	L	GF	GA	GD	Pts	Qualification
1	Pazinka (P)	12	7	3	2	22	12	+10	17	Promotion to Croatian First Football League
2	Kraljevica	12	5	2	5	14	18	−4	12	
3	Orijent	12	4	3	5	14	13	+1	11	
4	Labin	12	4	0	8	13	20	−7	8	

Source: rsssf.org
(P) Promoted

== South Group "Jug" ==
Pos	Team	Pld	W	D	L	GF	GA	GD	Pts	Qualification
1	Primorac Stobreč	14	10	3	1	18	5	+13	23	Won playoff 3-2 (1-1, 2-1) on aggregate over MAR Solin
2	MAR Solin	14	10	3	1	23	7	+16	23	
3	NK Split	14	8	4	2	19	20	−1	20	
4	Neretva Metković	14	4	5	5	14	11	+3	13	
5	Neretvanac Opuzen	14	6	1	7	10	18	−8	13	
6	Junak Sinj	14	4	0	10	22	19	+3	8	
7	Jadran Ploče	14	2	3	9	11	24	−13	7	
8	Slaven Konavle	14	2	1	11	16	35	−19	5	

Source: rsssf.org

== North Group "Sjever" ==
Pos	Team	Pld	W	D	L	GF	GA	GD	Pts	Qualification
1	Radnik Velika Gorica (P)	10	7	2	1	22	9	+13	16	Promotion to Croatian First Football League
2	Špansko	10	6	1	3	16	11	+5	13	
3	Samobor	10	4	1	5	16	14	+2	9	
4	Segesta Sisak (P)	10	4	0	6	12	13	−1	8	Promotion to Croatian First Football League
5	Karlovac	10	3	2	5	8	17	−9	8	
6	Trešnjevka	10	2	3	5	9	19	−10	7	

Source: rsssf.org
(P) Promoted

== East Group "Istok" ==
The East Group was not played due to the Croatian War of Independence. The group would have consisted of NK Belišće, NK Croatia Bogdanovci, HŠK Marsonia Slavonski Brod, NK Metalac Osijek, and NK Olimpija Osijek. NK Belišće was invited to the 1. HNL for the 1992-93 season.

== Playoff ==
Semi-final
Zapad	NK Pazinka	1	4	5
Jug	NK Primorac	4	0	4
Sjever	NK Radnik
Istok	(bye)

Final
NK Pazinka	1	0	1
NK Radnik	0	3	3
