= 2009–10 Croatian Football Cup =

Tournament details
- Country: Croatia
- Teams: 48

Final positions
- Champions: Hajduk Split (5th title)
- Runners-up: Šibenik
- UEFA Europa League: Hajduk Split

Tournament statistics
- Matches played: 54
- Goals scored: 185 (3.43 per match)
- Top goal scorer: Senijad Ibričić (8)

The 2009–10 Croatian Football Cup was the nineteenth season of Croatia's football knockout competition.

The defending champions were Dinamo Zagreb since they won the previous year's cup by defeating Hajduk Split on penalties after the result was tied 3–3 on aggregate.

The cup kicked off with the single-legged preliminary round which was played on 25 and 26 August 2009. Top flight clubs entered the competition in the following round, played on 22 and 23 September 2009. The two-legged final was played on 21 April and 5 May 2010, and was contested by Šibenik and Hajduk Split.

This was the first cup final for Šibenik, and a first time that they had passed through beyond the second round in the Croatian Cup. Hajduk Split won their fifth cup in nine finals. It was their first cup triumph in seven years since 2003 and their first silverware overall in five years since their 2004–05 Croatian championship title.

This was the first time that two Dalmatian clubs had reached the Croatian Cup final.

== Calendar ==
Round	Main date	Number of fixtures	Clubs	New entries this round
Preliminary round	25 and 26 August 2009	16	48 → 32	none
First round	22 and 23 September 2009	16	32 → 16	16
Second round	27 and 28 October 2009	8	16 → 8	none
Quarter-finals	25 November and 9 December 2009	8	8 → 4	none
Semi-finals	24 March and 7 April 2010	4	4 → 2	none
Final	21 April and 5 May 2010	2	2 → 1	none

== Preliminary round ==
The draw for the preliminary round was held on 12 August, and matches were held on 25 and 26 August 2009. This round consisted of 16 single-legged fixtures.

Tie no	Home team	Score	Away team
1	Grafičar Vodovod	0–6	Karlovac
2	MV Croatia	5–1	Bistra
3	Krka	0–1	Plitvica
4	Orijent	2–1	Podravina
5	Mladost Ždralovi	0–5	Slavonac CO
6	Vuteks Sloga	2–4	Rudar Labin
7	Gaj	2–5	Croatia Sesvete
8	Koprivnica	0–0 (2–4 p)	Nehaj
9^{*}	Međimurje	2–0	Hrvatski Dragovoljac
10^{*}	Rovinj	0–1	Moslavina
11	Velebit	3–2	Olimpija Osijek
12	Graničar	2–0	Podravac
13	Mladost Prelog	2–4	Lipik
14^{*}	Bjelovar	0–1	RNK Split
15	Konavljanin	3–1	Dugo Selo
16	Suhopolje	7–0	BSK Budaševo

* Matches played on 25 August.

== First round ==
The draw for the first round proper was held on 27 August, and matches were held on 22 and 23 September 2009.

Tie no	Home team	Score	Away team
1	Plitvica	0–4	Dinamo Zagreb
2	MV Croatia	0–2	Rijeka
3	Lipik	3–5	Hajduk Split
4	Velebit	0–2	Varteks
5	RNK Split	0–2	Slaven Belupo
6	Orijent	1–2	NK Zagreb
7	Rudar Labin	5–2	Cibalia
8	Graničar	1–3	Osijek
9	Suhopolje	2–2 (8–9 p)	Inter Zaprešić
10	Slavonac CO	1–5	Pomorac
11	Nehaj	0–1 (aet)	Segesta
12	Croatia Sesvete	0–1	Istra 1961
13	Karlovac	3–0	HAŠK
14	Moslavina	2–0	Konavljanin
15	Belišće	0–3	Šibenik
16	Vinogradar	4–1 (aet)	Međimurje

== Second round ==
The matches were played on 27 and 28 October 2009.

Tie no	Home team	Score	Away team
1^{*}	Dinamo Zagreb	4–1	Vinogradar
2	Šibenik	4–0	Rijeka
3	Hajduk Split	5–1	Moslavina
4	Varteks	2–1	Karlovac
5	Istra 1961	0–1	Slaven Belupo
6	NK Zagreb	3–1	Segesta
7	Pomorac	9–0	Rudar Labin
8	Osijek	1–0 (aet)	Inter Zaprešić

* Although Dinamo were seeded as hosts, they agreed to play the match at Vinogradar's ground at Mladina near Jastrebarsko.

== Quarter-finals ==
The draw was held on 3 November. First legs were held on 25 November and second legs on 9 December 2009.

Team 1	Agg.	Team 2	1st leg	2nd leg
NK Zagreb	1–4	Hajduk Split	0–0	1–4
Slaven Belupo	1–6	Varteks	1–4	0–2
Osijek	1–5	Šibenik	1–1	0–4
Pomorac	2–5	Dinamo Zagreb	0–2	2–3

== Semi-finals ==
24 March 2010
16:00 CET

Šibenik	0–0	Varteks
	Report (in Croatian)

Stadion Šubićevac, Šibenik
Attendance: 3,000
Referee: Igor Pristovnik (Zagreb)
7 April 2010
16:00 CET

Varteks	0–2	Šibenik
	Report (in Croatian)	Vidić (yellow card) 31' (yellow-red card) 31'; Zec 75'; Fuštar 90+7'

Stadion Varteks, Varaždin
Attendance: 3,000
Referee: Igor Pristovnik (Zagreb)

Šibenik won 2–0 on aggregate

24 March 2010
17:30 CET

Dinamo Zagreb	0–0	Hajduk Split
	Report (in Croatian)	J. Buljat (yellow card) 75' (yellow-red card) 80'

Stadion Maksimir, Zagreb
Attendance: 13,000
Referee: Igor Križarić (Čakovec)
7 April 2010
17:30 CET

Hajduk Split	1–0	Dinamo Zagreb
Ibričić 51'	Report (in Croatian)

Stadion Poljud, Split
Attendance: 30,000
Referee: Andrej Burilo (Osijek)

Hajduk Split won 1–0 on aggregate

== Final ==
=== First leg ===
21 April 2010
17:30

Hajduk Split	2–1	Šibenik
Tičinović 62'; Ibričić 88'	Report (in Croatian)	Zec 65' (pen.)

Stadion Poljud, Split
Attendance: 15,000
Referee: Draženko Kovačić (Križevci)

=== Second leg ===
5 May 2010
17:30

Šibenik	0–2	Hajduk Split
	Report (in Croatian)	Vukušić 16'; Ibričić 90+3' (pen.)

Stadion Šubićevac, Šibenik
Attendance: 5,500
Referee: Domagoj Vučkov (Rijeka)

Hajduk Split win 4–1 on aggregate.

== See also ==
- 2009–10 Croatian First Football League
- 2009–10 Croatian Second Football League
