= 1994–95 Croatian Second Football League =

Druga HNL
- Season: 1994–95
- Champions: Hrvatski Dragovoljac (West Division); Slavonija Požega (North Division); Uskok Klis (South Division)
- Promoted: Hrvatski Dragovoljac; Orijent; Slavonija Požega; Mladost 127; Uskok Klis; Dubrovnik
- Relegated: Rudar Labin; Nehaj; Dubrava; Valpovka; Neretvanac

The 1994–95 Druga HNL (also known as 2. HNL) season was the 4th season of Croatia's second-level football since its establishment in 1992.

The league consisted of 52 teams organized into three geographic groups: Zapad (West, 19 teams), Sjever (North, 16 teams), and Jug (South, 17 teams).

== West Division ==
Pos	Team	Pld	W	D	L	GF	GA	GD	Pts	Promotion or relegation
1	Hrvatski Dragovoljac (C, P)	36	30	5	1	83	12	+71	95	Promotion to Croatian First B Football League
2	Orijent (P)	36	24	8	4	86	19	+67	80	Promotion to Croatian First B Football League
3	Croatia Sesvete	36	20	9	7	77	38	+39	69	
4	Napredak Velika Mlaka	36	21	4	11	74	37	+37	67	
5	Ponikve	36	17	10	9	63	40	+23	61	
6	Pazinka	36	16	6	14	50	46	+4	54	
7	Radnik Velika Gorica	36	16	5	15	49	47	+2	53	
8	Vrapče	36	13	12	11	41	30	+11	51	
9	Jadran Poreč	36	15	5	16	53	50	+3	50	
10	Samobor	36	14	8	14	57	55	+2	50	
11	Špansko	36	14	8	14	48	47	+1	50	
12	Karlovac	36	13	8	15	59	35	+24	47	
13	Uljanik	35	12	8	15	40	48	−8	44	
14	Buje	36	12	4	20	39	66	−27	40	
15	Trešnjevka	36	11	6	19	53	73	−20	39	
16	Rovinj	36	11	3	22	33	86	−53	36	
17	Rudar Labin (R)	36	9	6	21	38	95	−57	33	Relegation to Croatian Third Football League
18	Nehaj (R)	35	6	8	21	27	71	−44	26	Relegation to Croatian Third Football League
19	Dubrava (R)	36	4	3	29	22	97	−75	15	Relegation to Croatian Third Football League

Source: RSSSF.org
Rules for classification: 1) points; 2) goal difference; 3) number of goals scored.
(C) Champions; (P) Promoted; (R) Relegated

== North Division ==
Pos	Team	Pld	W	D	L	GF	GA	GD	Pts	Promotion or relegation
1	Slavonija Požega (C, P)	30	20	5	5	69	26	+43	65	Promotion to Croatian First B Football League
2	Mladost 127 (P)	30	21	2	7	61	31	+30	65	Promotion to Croatian First B Football League
3	Slaven Belupo	30	17	6	7	68	25	+43	57	
4	Bjelovar	30	15	10	5	69	25	+44	55	
5	Čakovec	30	15	4	11	54	52	+2	49	
6	Budućnost Hodošan	30	13	9	8	46	33	+13	48	
7	Mladost Cerić	30	13	5	12	52	44	+8	44	
8	Croatia Đakovo	30	13	3	14	43	44	−1	39	
9	Jedinstvo Donji Miholjac	30	12	3	15	39	44	−5	39	
10	Spačva	30	10	8	12	40	46	−6	38	
11	Metalac Osijek	30	10	5	15	39	53	−14	35	
12	Đakovo	30	10	4	16	40	47	−7	34	
13	Podravina Ludbreg	30	9	5	16	31	56	−25	32	
14	Olimpija Osijek	30	8	6	16	40	69	−29	30	
15	Križevci	30	8	3	19	30	79	−49	27	
16	Valpovka (R)	30	2	10	18	21	68	−47	16	Relegation to Croatian Third Football League

Source: RSSSF.org
Rules for classification: 1) points; 2) goal difference; 3) number of goals scored.
(C) Champions; (P) Promoted; (R) Relegated

== South Division ==
Pos	Team	Pld	W	D	L	GF	GA	GD	Pts	Promotion or relegation
1	Uskok Klis (C, P)	32	20	6	6	59	23	+36	66	Promotion to Croatian First B Football League
2	Dubrovnik (P)	32	18	8	6	60	28	+32	62	Promotion to Croatian First B Football League
3	Solin	32	16	9	7	54	27	+27	57	
4	RNK Split	32	15	10	7	51	34	+17	55	
5	Mosor	32	14	9	9	52	29	+23	51	
6	Trogir	32	13	10	9	31	31	0	49	
7	Slaven Gruda	32	12	6	14	35	38	−3	49	
8	Junak	32	10	10	12	37	37	0	40	
9	Jadran Kaštel Sućurac	32	9	13	10	37	43	−6	40	
10	Jadran Ploče	32	9	12	11	41	52	−11	39	
11	Val Kaštel Stari	32	9	10	13	30	36	−6	37	
12	Omiš	32	8	12	12	36	38	−2	36	
13	Raštane	32	9	9	14	36	47	−11	36	
14	Zmaj Makarska	32	11	3	18	39	53	−14	36	
15	Jadran Tučepi	32	9	8	15	40	55	−15	35	
16	Croatia Zmijavci	32	8	10	14	42	63	−21	34	
17	Neretvanac (R)	32	4	11	17	25	71	−46	23	Relegation to Croatian Third Football League

Source: RSSSF.org
Rules for classification: 1) points; 2) goal difference; 3) number of goals scored.
(C) Champions; (P) Promoted; (R) Relegated
