= 2003–04 Croatian Second Football League =

Druga HNL
- Season: 2003–04
- Champions: Međimurje (North Division); Pula 1856 (South Division)
- Promoted: Međimurje; Pula 1856
- Relegated: Virovitica; Sloga Nova Gradiška; Orijent

The 2003–04 Druga HNL (also known as 2. HNL) season was the 13th season of Croatia's second level football since its establishment in 1992. The league was contested in two regional groups (North Division and South Division), with 12 clubs each.

== North Division ==
=== First stage ===
Pos	Team	Pld	W	D	L	GF	GA	GD	Pts	Qualification
1	Međimurje	22	16	3	3	53	19	+34	51	Qualification to play-off group
2	Belišće	22	13	7	2	50	19	+31	46	Qualification to play-off group
3	Vukovar '91	22	13	2	7	36	29	+7	41	Qualification to play-off group
4	Grafičar Vodovod	22	9	5	8	37	28	+9	32	Qualification to play-off group
5	Slavonija Požega	22	8	7	7	34	33	+1	31	Qualification to play-off group
6	Metalac Osijek	22	8	6	8	40	36	+4	30	Qualification to play-off group
7	Virovitica	22	8	6	8	31	29	+2	30	Qualification to play-out group
8	Čakovec	22	7	5	10	31	44	−13	26	Qualification to play-out group
9	Koprivnica	22	6	6	10	33	45	−12	24	Qualification to play-out group
10	Dilj	22	6	5	11	38	50	−12	23	Qualification to play-out group
11	Valpovka	22	5	2	15	23	56	−33	17	Qualification to play-out group
12	Sloga Nova Gradiška	22	3	6	13	13	31	−18	15	Qualification to play-out group

Source: RSSSF.org
Rules for classification: 1) points; 2) goal difference; 3) number of goals scored.

==== Rounds 1–22 results ====
Home \ Away	BEL	ČAK	DILJ	GRV	KOP	MEĐ	MET	SLA	SNG	VAL	VIR	VUK
Belišće		4–0	1–1	2–0	4–2	0–0	3–1	1–1	3–0	4–1	3–1	2–0
Čakovec	0–5		5–0	2–1	2–2	0–3	2–0	1–1	1–1	1–2	1–0	0–4
Dilj	3–4	4–2		0–3	5–0	3–1	4–4	2–2	1–2	2–2	2–0	2–3
Grafičar Vodovod	0–4	2–1	5–0		2–2	0–0	3–2	3–0	2–1	4–1	2–3	4–0
Koprivnica	0–2	0–4	3–2	0–0		5–2	2–2	0–2	5–0	2–0	3–3	1–3
Međimurje	1–0	6–0	6–0	1–0	2–0		4–2	4–1	2–0	5–1	2–1	1–0
Metalac Osijek	0–1	2–1	2–1	1–1	1–2	1–2		3–1	2–1	6–0	2–1	2–1
Slavonija Požega	2–1	2–2	2–2	4–0	2–0	0–1	2–2		0–1	1–0	2–2	3–1
Sloga Nova Gradiška	0–0	0–1	0–1	0–0	1–1	1–2	1–1	1–2		3–0	0–1	0–0
Valpovka	2–2	2–3	2–1	1–4	1–2	0–5	0–3	3–0	1–0		2–0	1–2
Virovitica	2–2	1–1	1–0	2–1	3–1	1–1	0–0	2–1	2–0	4–0		1–2
Vukovar '91	2–2	2–1	0–2	1–0	2–0	3–2	3–1	1–3	3–0	2–1	1–0	

Source: RSSSF.org
Legend: Blue = home team win; Yellow = draw; Red = away team win.

=== Play-off Group ===
Pos	Team	Pld	W	D	L	GF	GA	GD	Pts	Qualification
1	Međimurje (C, P)	32	21	6	5	70	28	+42	69	Qualification to promotion play-off
2	Belišće	32	19	8	5	66	27	+39	65	
3	Slavonija Požega	32	13	10	9	54	47	+7	49	
4	Vukovar '91	32	14	5	13	45	54	−9	47	
5	Grafičar Vodovod	32	12	9	11	51	36	+15	45	
6	Metalac Osijek	32	10	8	14	48	56	−8	38	

Source: RSSSF.org
Rules for classification: 1) points; 2) goal difference; 3) number of goals scored.
(C) Champions; (P) Promoted

==== Rounds 23–32 results ====
Home \ Away	BEL	GRV	MEĐ	MET	SLA	VUK
Belišće		1–0	2–0	3–0	1–0	1–1
Grafičar Vodovod	2–1		0–0	0–0	5–0	4–0
Međimurje	1–0	2–0		2–1	2–2	4–0
Metalac Osijek	1–3	2–1	0–4		0–0	2–3
Slavonija Požega	2–1	2–2	3–1	3–0		4–0
Vukovar '91	1–3	0–0	1–1	1–2	2–4	

Source: RSSSF.org
Legend: Blue = home team win; Yellow = draw; Red = away team win.

=== Play-out Group ===
Pos	Team	Pld	W	D	L	GF	GA	GD	Pts	Qualification or relegation
7	Koprivnica	32	12	8	12	56	58	−2	44	
8	Dilj	32	10	10	12	53	57	−4	40	
9	Virovitica (Note: NK Virovitica withdrew from the competition at the end of the season) (R)	32	10	8	14	39	48	−9	38	
10	Čakovec	32	9	8	15	45	65	−20	35	
11	Valpovka	32	9	4	19	39	71	−32	31	Qualification to relegation play-off
12	Sloga Nova Gradiška (R)	32	7	8	17	29	48	−19	29	Relegation to Croatian Third Football League

Source: RSSSF.org
Rules for classification: 1) points; 2) goal difference; 3) number of goals scored.
(R) Relegated

==== Rounds 23–32 results ====
Home \ Away	ČAK	DILJ	KOP	SNG	VAL	VIR
Čakovec		2–2	0–3	2–1	1–3	2–1
Dilj	2–1		4–1	1–2	2–0	3–0
Koprivnica	2–2	0–0		4–0	3–2	4–0
Sloga Nova Gradiška	2–1	1–1	3–1		4–1	1–2
Valpovka	4–2	0–0	1–2	1–1		2–0
Virovitica	1–1	0–0	1–3	3–1	0–2	

Source: RSSSF.org
Legend: Blue = home team win; Yellow = draw; Red = away team win.

== South Division ==
=== First stage ===
Pos	Team	Pld	W	D	L	GF	GA	GD	Pts	Qualification
1	Pula 1856	22	12	7	3	38	19	+19	43	Qualification to play-off group
2	Solin Građa	22	12	3	7	39	25	+14	39	Qualification to play-off group
3	Pomorac	22	10	9	3	36	26	+10	39	Qualification to play-off group
4	Šibenik	22	12	1	9	36	28	+8	37	Qualification to play-off group
5	Segesta	22	11	3	8	32	27	+5	36	Qualification to play-off group
6	Novalja	22	10	4	8	29	25	+4	34	Qualification to play-off group
7	Uskok Klis	22	9	7	6	35	33	+2	34	Qualification to play-out group
8	Imotski	22	7	4	11	28	33	−5	25	Qualification to play-out group
9	Hrvatski Dragovoljac	22	6	7	9	20	26	−6	25	Qualification to play-out group
10	Croatia Sesvete	22	6	6	10	29	38	−9	24	Qualification to play-out group
11	GOŠK Dubrovnik	22	4	8	10	20	38	−18	20	Qualification to play-out group
12	Orijent	22	1	5	16	15	39	−24	8	Qualification to play-out group

Source: RSSSF.org
Rules for classification: 1) points; 2) goal difference; 3) number of goals scored.

==== Rounds 1–22 results ====
Home \ Away	SES	GOŠK	HRD	IMO	NOV	ORI	POM	PUL	ŠIB	SEG	SOL	USK
Croatia Sesvete		2–2	0–1	2–1	1–1	3–1	2–3	2–6	3–1	1–0	0–2	1–2
GOŠK Dubrovnik	0–3		0–0	0–1	0–2	2–0	1–4	1–1	4–2	2–0	0–0	2–1
Hrvatski Dragovoljac	2–0	1–1		1–1	2–0	1–1	1–1	0–1	0–3	3–1	0–1	1–0
Imotski	1–1	2–0	1–2		3–1	2–0	1–1	0–1	0–3	1–0	4–1	1–2
Novalja	2–1	2–1	1–0	3–1		1–0	1–1	0–0	1–1	1–0	3–1	3–0
Orijent	2–2	5–2	1–1	1–2	0–2		1–1	0–3	0–1	0–1	0–2	1–2
Pomorac	1–0	0–0	1–0	2–2	4–2	2–1		1–1	2–0	2–0	3–2	1–1
Pula 1856	2–2	1–1	1–0	3–2	1–0	3–0	2–2		1–0	2–1	1–0	8–1
Šibenik	1–2	1–0	4–1	3–0	2–1	1–0	1–0	2–0		0–1	1–2	4–2
Segesta	1–1	3–0	4–2	3–2	2–1	2–0	3–2	1–0	5–2		2–1	1–1
Solin Građa	4–0	1–1	2–0	2–0	2–0	4–0	1–2	2–1	3–2	2–0		3–3
Uskok Klis	2–0	6–0	1–1	1–0	2–1	1–1	3–0	1–1	0–1	1–1	2–1	

Source: RSSSF.org
Legend: Blue = home team win; Yellow = draw; Red = away team win.

=== Play-off Group ===
Pos	Team	Pld	W	D	L	GF	GA	GD	Pts	Qualification
1	Pula 1856 (C, P)	32	18	8	6	59	33	+26	62	Qualification to promotion play-off
2	Pomorac	32	16	10	6	55	39	+16	58	
3	Segesta	32	15	4	13	51	46	+5	49	
4	Šibenik	32	15	4	13	45	42	+3	49	
5	Solin Građa	32	15	3	14	56	47	+9	48	
6	Novalja	32	14	6	12	43	40	+3	48	

Source: RSSSF.org
Rules for classification: 1) points; 2) goal difference; 3) number of goals scored.
(C) Champions; (P) Promoted

==== Rounds 23–32 results ====
Home \ Away	NOV	POM	PUL	ŠIB	SEG	SOL
Novalja		4–3	2–0	0–0	1–2	1–2
Pomorac	2–0		4–3	4–0	1–0	3–2
Pula 1856	1–1	2–0		2–1	4–2	2–1
Šibenik	1–2	0–0	1–0		2–1	3–1
Segesta	3–1	1–2	1–2	1–1		4–3
Solin Građa	1–2	1–0	1–3	3–0	2–4	

Source: RSSSF.org
Legend: Blue = home team win; Yellow = draw; Red = away team win.

=== Play-out Group ===
Pos	Team	Pld	W	D	L	GF	GA	GD	Pts	Qualification or relegation
7	Uskok Klis	32	13	10	9	46	44	+2	49	
8	Hrvatski Dragovoljac	32	11	9	12	36	35	+1	42	
9	Croatia Sesvete	32	11	8	13	40	47	−7	41	
10	Imotski	32	11	5	16	40	44	−4	38	
11	GOŠK Dubrovnik	32	9	10	13	33	48	−15	37	Qualification to relegation play-off
12	Orijent (R)	32	2	7	23	23	62	−39	13	Relegation to Croatian Third Football League

Source: RSSSF.org
Rules for classification: 1) points; 2) goal difference; 3) number of goals scored.
(R) Relegated

==== Rounds 23–32 results ====
Home \ Away	SES	GOŠK	HRD	IMO	ORI	USK
Croatia Sesvete		2–0	2–1	1–0	3–0	0–3
GOŠK Dubrovnik	2–0		1–0	2–1	3–1	2–2
Hrvatski Dragovoljac	0–0	3–0		3–1	2–1	3–0
Imotski	1–0	1–0	2–0		4–1	1–1
Orijent	1–1	0–0	2–4	2–1		0–2
Uskok Klis	1–2	0–3	0–0	1–0	1–0	

Source: RSSSF.org
Legend: Blue = home team win; Yellow = draw; Red = away team win.

== Promotion play-off ==
Međimurje and Pula 1856, winners of the North and South Division, qualified for a two-legged promotion play-off, which took place on 12 and 16 May 2004. The tie ended in a 2–2 aggregate score and Pula 1856 won it after the penalty shootout ended 5–4 in their favor, thereby earning promotion to the Prva HNL for the following season.

12 May 2004

Međimurje	2–0	Pula 1856
Kelemen 14'; Ribić 26'	Report (in Croatian)

Stadion SRC Mladost, Čakovec
Attendance: 3,000
Referee: Željko Širić (Osijek)

16 May 2004

Pula 1856	2–0	Međimurje
Jerneić 38', 59'	Report (in Croatian)
Penalties
Ostović (penalty missed); Deranja (penalty scored); Raić-Sudar (penalty scored); Trešnjić (penalty scored); Iftić (penalty missed); Dobrić (penalty missed); Pauletić (penalty scored); Jerneić (penalty scored)	5–4	(penalty scored) Domjanić; (penalty missed) Ribić; (penalty scored) Šarić; (penalty missed) Ratković; (penalty scored) Perić; (penalty missed) Sesar; (penalty scored) Haxhiu; (penalty missed) Batista

Stadion Aldo Drosina, Pula
Attendance: 6,000
Referee: Edo Trivković (Split)

However, Međimurje had another chance for promotion, as the losing team from the promotion play-off played another two-legged tie against the 11th placed team of Prva HNL, Cibalia. Međimurje won 4–2 on aggregate and was promoted to 2004–05 Prva HNL.

== See also ==
- 2003–04 Prva HNL
- 2003–04 Croatian Cup
