= August Bivec =

Croatian footballer and coach

Personal information
- Date of birth: 30 September 1909
- Place of birth: Vrbovec, Kingdom of Croatia-Slavonia, Austro-Hungary
- Date of death: 22 June 1987 (aged 77)
- Place of death: Zagreb, SR Croatia, SFR Yugoslavia
- Position: Defender

Youth career
- Građanski Zagreb
- Concordia Zagreb

Senior career*
Years	Team	Apps	(Gls)
1927–1930	HAŠK Zagreb		
1930–1934	Građanski Zagreb	55	(0)
1934–1935	BSK Belgrade		
1935–1938	Građanski Zagreb	15	(0)

International career
1933	Yugoslavia	1	(0)

Managerial career
- 1937–19xx: Građanski Bjelovar
- 19xx–1941: Viktorija Karlovac
- 194x–19xx: Grafičar Zagreb
- Rade Končar
- NK Zagreb
- Lokomotiva Zagreb
- Tekstilac Zagreb
- Metalac Zagreb
- Samobor
- Radnik Velika Gorica
- Dolomit Podsused
- Segesta Sisak
- * Club domestic league appearances and goals

August Bivec (30 September 1909 – 22 June 1987) was a Croatian and Yugoslav football player and coach.

== Playing career ==
=== Club ===
Born in Vrbovec, a town located about 30 kilometers north-east of Zagreb, he started playing in 1925 in the youth team of HŠK Građanski Zagreb. A misfortune of missing a penalty-kick will make him leave Građanski and join city-rivals HŠK Concordia. Between 1927 and 1930 he played as senior with HAŠK, and then he returned to Građanski where, for the exception of the season 1934–35 which he spent playing with BSK Belgrade, he will stay until 1938. With Građanski, playing along Bernard Hügl in the defense, he wins the Yugoslav championship in 1937 and he became noticed as fast and elegant defender with great positioning and ball recovering skills. He finished his career in 1938 when, after disagreements with Građanski president Berger, he refused to sign a new contract.

=== International ===
August Bivec made one appearance for the Yugoslavia national team. It was in a friendly game against Czechoslovakia, a 2–1 win, played on August 6, 1933, in Zagreb.

While he was on his military service, he was part of the Royal Yugoslav Army team that played the Little Entente tournament in 1935 in Bucharest, Romania.

== Coaching career ==
He became one of the first professional coaches in Yugoslavia. He started right in 1937 when he took charge of BGŠK archiving impressive results. Before the start of Second World War in 1941, he also coached in Karlovac, a club named ŠK Viktorija. After the war, he coached numerous clubs from and around Zagreb, namely, Grafičar Zagreb, Rade Končar, NK Zagreb, NK Lokomotiva Zagreb, Tekstilac Zagreb, Metalac Zagreb, NK Samobor, NK Radnik Velika Gorica, NK Dolomit Podsused and NK Segesta. His major achievement was driving NK Samobor from the lower leagues to the national third level.

For many years he was active in several football organisations; between 1971 and 1973 he was president of the Association of Football Coaches of Croatia, between 1971 and 1973, he was member of the direction board of the Association of Football Coaches of Yugoslavia, and between 1978 and 1981 he was the first president of the Council of Football Coaches of Croatia.

== Personal life ==
He graduated at the Zagreb State Commercial Academy in 1929 and worked as chief accounting officer at the Zagreb Institute of Health Protection until his retirement in 1965.

He was awarded with the zlatna plaketa by the Football Association of Yugoslavia.

He died on June 22, 1987, in Zagreb.

== Honours ==
Građanski Zagreb

- Yugoslav championship: 1936–37
