= 1999–2000 Croatian Second Football League =

Druga HNL
- Season: 1999–2000
- Champions: Marsonia
- Promoted: Marsonia; Čakovec
- Relegated: Čazmatrans; RNK Split; Zagorec Krapina; Otok; Mladost 127
- Top goalscorer: Miroslav Vukić (26)

The 1999–2000 Druga HNL was the ninth season of Druga HNL, the second level league in Croatian football.

The format of the league was unchanged from the 1998–99 season. A total of 17 clubs competed in Druga HNL this season, in a double round-robin format (following relegation from 1998–99 Prva HNL, Mladost 127 was supposed to compete in Druga HNL, but the club folded due to financial difficulties and Druga HNL was reduced to 17 teams before the season started).

== Clubs ==
Club	City / Town	Stadium	Capacity	1998–99 result
Belišće	Belišće	Gradski stadion Belišće	4,000	
Bjelovar	Bjelovar	Gradski stadion Bjelovar	4,000	
Čakovec	Čakovec	Stadion SRC Mladost	8,000	
Čazmatrans	Čazma	Gradski stadion Čazma	1,500	
Croatia Sesvete	Sesvete	Stadion ŠRC Sesvete	3,500	
Jadran Poreč	Poreč	Stadion Veli Jože	2,000	
Marsonia	Slavonski Brod	Gradski stadion uz Savu	10,000	
Mosor	Žrnovnica	Igralište Pricviće	3,000	
Orijent	Rijeka	Stadion SC Krimeja	4,000	
Otok	Otok	Stadion Otok	500	
Pomorac	Kostrena	Stadion Žuknica	3,500	
Segesta	Sisak	Gradski stadion Sisak	8,000	
Solin	Solin	Stadion pokraj Jadra	4,000	
RNK Split	Split	Stadion Park mladeži	8,000	
PIK Vrbovec	Vrbovec	Gradski stadion kraj Sajmišta	3,000	
Zadarkomerc	Zadar	Stadion Stanovi	5,860	
Zagorec Krapina	Krapina	Stadion SRC Podgora	3,000	

== League table ==
Pos	Team	Pld	W	D	L	GF	GA	GD	Pts	Promotion or relegation
1	Marsonia (C, P)	32	19	7	6	52	18	+34	64	Promotion to Croatian First Football League
2	Čakovec (P)	32	18	9	5	62	38	+24	63	Promotion to Croatian First Football League
3	Zadarkomerc	32	19	5	8	47	25	+22	62	
4	Pomorac	32	17	9	6	49	26	+23	60	
5	Mosor	32	17	8	7	55	26	+29	59	
6	Segesta	32	15	11	6	58	29	+29	56	
7	PIK Vrbovec	32	15	10	7	57	39	+18	55	
8	Solin	32	15	6	11	53	42	+11	51	
9	Orijent	32	10	11	11	37	41	−4	41	
10	Belišće	32	11	6	15	42	43	−1	39	
11	Jadran Poreč	32	11	5	16	37	53	−16	38	
12	Croatia Sesvete	32	9	7	16	38	48	−10	34	
13	Bjelovar	32	9	5	18	38	49	−11	32	
14	Čazmatrans (R)	32	7	8	17	33	50	−17	29	Relegation to Croatian Third Football League
15	RNK Split (R)	32	6	8	18	29	68	−39	26	Relegation to Croatian Third Football League
16	Zagorec Krapina (R)	32	5	7	20	24	63	−39	22	Relegation to Croatian Third Football League
17	Otok (R)	32	6	4	22	28	81	−53	22	Relegation to Croatian Third Football League

Source: RSSSF.org
Rules for classification: 1) points; 2) goal difference; 3) number of goals scored.
(C) Champions; (P) Promoted; (R) Relegated

== Results ==
Home \ Away	BEL	BJE	SES	ČAK	ČAZ	JAD	MAR	MOS	ORI	OTO	POM	SEG	SOL	SPL	VRB	ZAG	ZAD
Belišće		5–0	1–0	2–3	2–0	1–1	0–4	2–1	3–0	3–0	0–1	2–1	0–3	5–1	1–2	0–0	1–2
Bjelovar	0–0		0–0	1–2	1–0	5–0	1–0	2–2	0–3	3–0	3–1	1–2	0–1	3–2	0–0	4–0	0–2
Croatia Sesvete	1–1	2–1		1–4	1–1	0–1	0–1	0–2	1–1	3–0	1–0	0–5	3–0	0–0	2–3	2–0	2–0
Čakovec	2–1	2–1	3–3		0–0	3–0	1–1	1–0	5–1	4–0	1–1	2–1	1–0	5–0	0–0	1–1	2–1
Čazmatrans	2–2	2–1	2–0	0–3		3–1	0–3	0–0	0–1	3–5	0–2	1–1	2–3	4–0	3–1	2–1	0–1
Jadran Poreč	2–0	2–2	0–2	3–1	2–0		1–0	0–3	1–1	2–0	2–1	0–1	2–3	2–3	0–1	3–1	2–0
Marsonia	2–1	2–0	1–0	3–0	2–0	5–1		2–1	2–0	1–2	0–1	0–0	4–0	2–1	2–0	2–1	0–2
Mosor	2–0	3–0	2–2	6–1	1–0	1–0	1–3		3–0	5–1	1–1	0–0	1–0	4–1	2–1	4–0	1–0
Orijent	2–1	0–1	1–0	2–2	2–2	3–1	0–1	0–0		2–0	1–1	2–1	4–1	1–1	2–4	3–0	1–0
Otok	0–1	1–0	1–4	1–5	2–0	0–0	0–6	1–0	1–1		1–3	1–6	1–2	0–3	1–1	3–0	0–3
Pomorac	2–0	2–0	3–0	4–3	1–0	5–1	0–0	1–2	0–0	3–1		0–0	2–2	2–0	1–0	3–0	2–1
Segesta	1–1	4–2	2–1	2–2	3–4	3–1	0–0	1–0	1–1	2–0	1–1		1–0	7–0	2–0	1–2	3–0
Solin	2–0	4–3	2–1	1–2	2–0	0–0	1–2	2–2	2–0	4–0	0–2	0–2		2–1	6–1	5–0	1–1
RNK Split	1–3	2–1	3–2	0–1	1–1	1–3	0–0	0–2	1–0	2–1	0–0	1–2	0–0		1–1	0–0	1–3
PIK Vrbovec	2–0	2–1	4–2	0–0	1–1	2–0	0–0	3–1	3–1	5–2	2–0	1–1	2–2	5–1		6–1	2–2
Zagorec Krapina	0–3	0–1	1–2	0–1	2–0	0–2	0–0	1–2	1–1	4–1	1–3	1–1	0–1	4–1	1–0		1–1
Zadarkomerc	3–0	1–0	2–0	1–0	2–0	2–1	3–1	0–0	1–0	1–1	2–0	2–0	2–1	2–0	0–2	4–0	

Source: soccerpunter.com
Legend: Blue = home team win; Yellow = draw; Red = away team win.

== See also ==
- 1999–2000 Prva HNL
- 1999–2000 Croatian Cup
