= 1998–99 Croatian Second Football League =

Druga HNL
- Season: 1998–99
- Champions: Vukovar '91
- Promoted: Vukovar '91; Istra Pula
- Relegated: Imotska Krajina; Croatia Đakovo; Budućnost Hodošan; Samobor; Posavina Zagreb; Inker Zaprešić
- Top goalscorer: Dubravko Zdrilić (29)

The 1998–99 Druga HNL was the 8th season of Druga HNL, the second level league in Croatian football.

The format of the league was changed and the five regional subdivisions which composed the Druga HNL in the 1997–98 season were merged into a single nationwide format for the 1998–99 season. A total of 19 clubs competed in Druga HNL this season, in a double round-robin format.

== Clubs ==
Club	City / Town	Stadium	Capacity	1997–98 result
Belišće	Belišće	Gradski stadion Belišće	4,000	2nd: 2.HNL East
Bjelovar	Bjelovar	Gradski stadion Bjelovar	4,000	3rd: 2.HNL North
Budućnost Hodošan	Hodošan	Stadion Sportski dom	1,000	2nd: 2.HNL North
Čakovec	Čakovec	Stadion SRC Mladost	8,000	1st: 2.HNL North
Croatia Đakovo	Đakovo	Gradski stadion Đakovo	3,000	3rd: 2.HNL East
Croatia Sesvete	Sesvete	Stadion ŠRC Sesvete	3,500	5th: 2.HNL Center
Imotska Krajina	Proložac	Stadion Šarampov	1,000	3rd: 2.HNL South
Inker Zaprešić	Zaprešić	Stadion ŠRC Zaprešić	4,500	4th: 2.HNL Center
Istra Pula	Pula	Stadion Aldo Drosina	7,000	2nd: 2.HNL West
Jadran Poreč	Poreč	Stadion Veli Jože	2,000	1st: 2.HNL West
Orijent	Rijeka	Stadion SC Krimeja	4,000	3rd: 2.HNL West
Otok	Otok			4th: 2.HNL East
Posavina Zagreb	Zagreb	Igralište na Savici	1,000	3rd: 2.HNL Center
Samobor	Samobor	Gradski stadion Samobor	5,000	12th in Prva HNL
Segesta	Sisak	Gradski stadion Sisak	8,000	1st: 2.HNL Center
Solin	Solin	Stadion pokraj Jadra	4,000	2nd: 2.HNL South
RNK Split	Split	Stadion Park mladeži	8,000	1st: 2.HNL South
Vukovar '91	Vukovar	Gradski stadion Borovo Naselje	6,000	
Zagorec Krapina	Krapina	Stadion SRC Podgora	3,000	2nd: 2.HNL Center

== League table ==
Pos	Team	Pld	W	D	L	GF	GA	GD	Pts	Promotion or relegation
1	Vukovar '91 (C, P)	36	22	8	6	69	29	+40	74	Promotion to Croatian First Football League
2	Istra Pula (P)	36	21	9	6	71	27	+44	72	Promotion to Croatian First Football League
3	Segesta	36	22	4	10	84	34	+50	70	
4	Čakovec	36	19	8	9	62	38	+24	65	
5	RNK Split	36	17	8	11	60	34	+26	59	
6	Belišće	36	17	8	11	67	50	+17	59	
7	Bjelovar	36	17	7	12	53	43	+10	58	
8	Otok	36	16	7	13	56	49	+7	55	
9	Zagorec Krapina	36	15	6	15	50	55	−5	51	
10	Jadran Poreč	36	13	9	14	58	45	+13	48	
11	Solin	36	14	6	16	49	49	0	48	
12	Croatia Sesvete	36	14	6	16	52	56	−4	48	
13	Orijent	36	13	9	14	39	48	−9	48	
14	Imotska Krajina (R)	36	13	8	15	49	54	−5	47	Relegation to Croatian Third Football League
15	Croatia Đakovo (R)	36	11	12	13	45	48	−3	45	Relegation to Croatian Third Football League
16	Budućnost Hodošan (R)	36	12	8	16	49	85	−36	44	Relegation to Croatian Third Football League
17	Samobor (R)	36	5	11	20	40	84	−44	26	Relegation to Croatian Third Football League
18	Posavina Zagreb (R)	36	5	7	24	29	76	−47	22	Relegation to Croatian Third Football League
19	Inker Zaprešić (R)	36	3	5	28	25	103	−78	14	Relegation to Croatian Third Football League

Source: RSSSF.org
Rules for classification: 1) points; 2) goal difference; 3) number of goals scored.
(C) Champions; (P) Promoted; (R) Relegated

== See also ==
- 1998–99 Prva HNL
- 1998–99 Croatian Cup
