= 1995–96 Croatian Second Football League =

Druga HNL
- Season: 1995–96
- Champions: Samobor (West Division); Slaven Belupo (North Division); Junak (South Division)
- Promoted: Samobor; Ponikve; Zagorec Krapina; Napredak Velika Mlaka; Slaven Belupo; Olimpija Osijek; Čakovec Union; Junak; Mosor
- Relegated: Lučki Radnik Rijeka; Spačva Otok

The 1995–96 Druga HNL (also known as 2. HNL) season was the 5th season of Croatia's second-level football since its establishment in 1992.

The league consisted of 50 teams organized into three geographic groups: Zapad (West, 18 teams), Sjever (North, 16 teams), and Jug (South, 16 teams).

== West Division ==
Pos	Team	Pld	W	D	L	GF	GA	GD	Pts	Promotion or relegation
1	Samobor (C, P)	34	25	7	2	102	18	+84	82	Promotion to Croatian First B Football League
2	Ponikve (P)	34	22	4	8	71	24	+47	70	Promotion to Croatian First B Football League
3	Zagorec Krapina (P)	34	19	8	7	85	32	+53	65	Promotion to Croatian First B Football League
4	Napredak Velika Mlaka (P)	34	18	10	6	50	25	+25	64	Promotion to Croatian First B Football League
5	Uljanik	34	18	8	8	58	36	+22	62	
6	Jadran Poreč	34	16	9	9	47	40	+7	57	
7	Buje	34	15	10	9	42	30	+12	55	
8	PIK Vrbovec	34	14	9	11	46	38	+8	51	
9	Špansko	34	13	7	14	40	32	+8	46	
10	Vrapče	34	12	10	12	52	42	+10	46	
11	Gospić '91	34	11	9	14	36	53	−17	42	
12	Croatia Sesvete	34	12	4	18	46	64	−18	40	
13	Radnik Velika Gorica	34	10	7	17	44	55	−11	37	
14	Karlovac	34	9	8	17	25	52	−27	35	
15	Pazinka	34	9	7	18	31	51	−20	34	
16	Rovinj	34	8	4	22	27	73	−46	28	
17	Trešnjevka	34	5	12	17	21	55	−34	27	
18	Lučki Radnik Rijeka (R)	34	1	5	28	7	110	−103	8	Relegation to Croatian Third Football League

Source: RSSSF.org
(C) Champions; (P) Promoted; (R) Relegated

== North Division ==
Pos	Team	Pld	W	D	L	GF	GA	GD	Pts	Promotion or relegation
1	Slaven Belupo (C, P)	30	25	2	3	81	13	+68	77	Promotion to Croatian First B Football League
2	Olimpija Osijek (P)	30	22	5	3	71	18	+53	71	Promotion to Croatian First B Football League
3	Graničar Đurđevac	30	17	7	6	59	29	+30	58	
4	Čakovec Union (P)	30	17	3	10	76	42	+34	54	Promotion to Croatian First B Football League
5	Budućnost Hodošan	30	16	4	10	82	43	+39	52	
6	Satnica	30	16	4	10	55	38	+17	52	
7	Bjelovar	30	14	5	11	42	36	+6	47	
8	Croatia Đakovo	30	14	2	14	48	54	−6	44	
9	Čepin	30	12	6	12	33	34	−1	42	
10	Spačva Otok (R)	30	10	8	12	42	50	−8	38	Dissolved after the season
11	Metalac OLT Osijek	30	10	7	13	42	36	+6	37	
12	Jedinstvo Donji Miholjac	30	9	7	14	40	51	−11	34	
13	Omladinac Novo Selo Rok	30	10	3	17	39	56	−17	33	
14	Đakovo	30	6	6	18	29	75	−46	24	
15	Križevci	30	5	3	22	23	103	−80	18	
16	Podravina Ludbreg	30	0	2	28	13	97	−84	2	

Source: RSSSF.org
(C) Champions; (P) Promoted; (R) Relegated

== South Division ==
Pos	Team	Pld	W	D	L	GF	GA	GD	Pts	Promotion or relegation
1	Junak (C, P)	30	20	7	3	48	23	+25	67	Promotion to Croatian First B Football League
2	Mosor (P)	30	19	10	1	59	11	+48	67	Promotion to Croatian First B Football League
3	Solin Kaltenberg	30	16	9	5	50	24	+26	57	
4	Val Kaštel Stari	30	13	8	9	32	26	+6	47	
5	Primorac Biograd na Moru	30	12	7	11	46	36	+10	43	
6	Jadran Kaštel Sućurac	30	11	8	11	40	32	+8	41	
7	RNK Split	30	10	10	10	51	34	+17	40	
8	Zmaj Makarska	30	11	4	15	35	43	−8	37	
9	Prevlaka Gruda	30	10	7	13	25	27	−2	37	
10	Omiš	30	8	12	10	32	36	−4	36	
11	Jadran NGB Ploče	30	10	5	15	34	39	−5	35	
12	Raštane	30	9	8	13	35	49	−14	35	
13	Jadran Tučepi	30	10	4	16	32	49	−17	34	
14	Mladost Proložac	30	8	9	13	28	39	−11	33	
15	Trogir	30	8	9	13	25	46	−21	33	
16	Croatia Zmijavci	30	5	3	22	26	84	−58	18	

Source: RSSSF.org
(C) Champions; (P) Promoted
