= NK Rudar =

NK Rudar may refer to:

- NK Rudar, football club from Labin, Croatia.
- NK Rudar, football club from Velenje, Slovenia.
- NK Rudar, football club from Trbovlje, Slovenia.
