= NK Slavonac =

NK Slavonac can refer to several football teams in Slavonia, Croatia.

- NK Slavonac Brodski Stupnik
- NK Slavonac Bukovlje
- NK Slavonac Đurđanci
- NK Slavonac Gornja Bebrina
- NK Slavonac Gradište
- NK Slavonac Gunjavci-Drežnik
- NK Slavonac Komletinci
- NK Slavonac Ladimirevci
- NK Slavonac Nova Kapela
- NK Slavonac Preslatinci
- NK Slavonac Pribiševci
- NK Slavonac Prkovci
- NK Slavonac Slatinik Drenjski
- NK Slavonac Slavonski Kobaš
- NK Slavonac CO (Stari Perkovci)
