= Ankica Zmaić =

Croatian politician (born 1969)

Member of the Croatian Parliament
- In office 22 July 2020 – 16 May 2024

Personal details
- Born: 2 June 1969 (age 55); Stari Perkovci, Croatia
- Political party: Croatian Democratic Union

Ankica Zmaić (born 2 June 1969) is a Croatian politician from the Croatian Democratic Union who served as a member of the Croatian Parliament.

== See also ==
- List of members of the Sabor, 2020–2024
