= Mario Čižmek =

Croatian footballer

Personal information
- Date of birth: 23 December 1975 (age 50)
- Place of birth: Zagreb, SFR Yugoslavia
- Height: 1.75 m (5 ft 9 in)
- Position: Midfielder

Senior career*
Years	Team	Apps	(Gls)
1997–2001	NK Zagreb	61	(9)
2001	Brotnjo	15	(7)
2002	Hapoel Petah Tikva	29	(1)
2002–2005	Kamen Ingrad	53	(5)
2005–2006	Inter Zaprešić	20	(1)
2006	KR Reykjavík	13	(1)
2007–2010	Croatia Sesvete	82	(16)

International career^{‡}
1994–1995	Croatia U20	7	(1)
1995–1997	Croatia U21	7	(0)
- * Club domestic league appearances and goals as of 9 January 2011 ‡ National team caps and goals as of 12 October 1997

Mario Čižmek (born 23 December 1975 in Zagreb) is a Croatian retired footballer.

== Club career ==
Čižmek previously played for NK Zagreb, NK Kamen Ingrad and NK Inter Zaprešić in the Croatian First League. He also had a spell in the Israeli Premier League with Hapoel Petah Tikva during the 2001-02 season and with KR Reykjavík in 2006.
