= Stari Perkovci =

Village in Croatia

Coordinates: 45°13′11″N 18°20′56″E

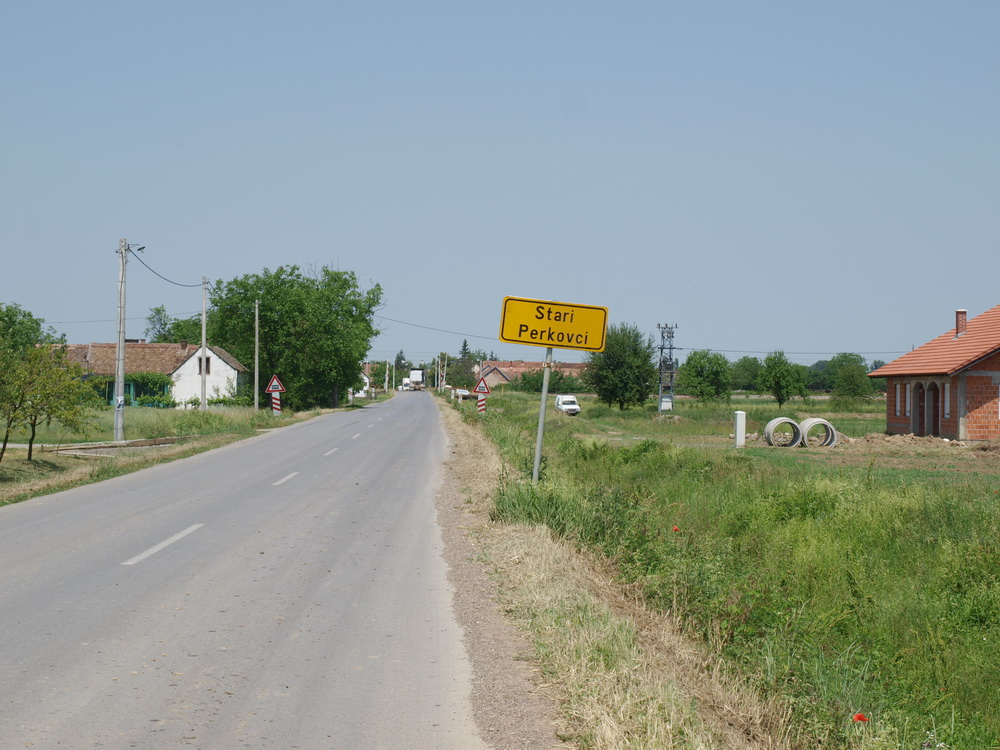
- Stari Perkovci in 2009
- Interactive map of Stari Perkovci
- Location within Croatia

Stari Perkovci is a village in Vrpolje municipality in Brod-Posavina County in Croatia. In 2011, it had 1,123 inhabitants.

Football club NK Slavonac CO represents the town.

== Notable people ==
- Ankica Zmaić, politician
