= HNŠK Moslavina =

Croatian football club

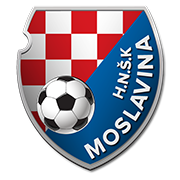
- Full name: Hrvatski nogometni športski klub Moslavina
- Founded: 1919
- Ground: Gradski stadion u Kutini
- Capacity: 2,000
- Chairman: Tomislav Kojundžić
- Manager: Siniša Grubišić
- League: 4.NL Središte Zagreb
- 2021-22: 3rd, 4. NL Središte Zagreb
- Website: http://www.nk-moslavina.hr/
Home colours	Away colours

HNŠK Moslavina is a Croatian football club based in the town of Kutina.

== History ==
The club was founded as Hrvatski nogometni športski klub Moslavina (Croatian Football Sports Club Moslavina) in 1919 by group of students led by Milan Marcijuš, Zlatko Golner, Otokar Pavičić and Imbro Rechnitzer. In its first official game, Moslavina played host to Građanski from Pakrac and ended up losing 9–1. Over the following three decades, the team participated in regional competitions, before qualifying for the top Croatian football league competition (Hrvatska nogometna liga) in 1951 under the name Radnik Moslavina, as the club was called from 1946 to 1951. That same year Radnik Moslavina also reached the Yugoslav Cup Round of 64. After a brief period under the name Metan (1951–1959), the club was renamed back to Moslavina. In those years, the club tried to qualify for the Republic League and occasionally won.

In 1964, the team's new home ground, Gradski stadion u Kutini, was officially opened with a game against the Croatia U-19 team. Until the dissolution of the Socialist Federal Republic of Yugoslavia, Moslavina played in the lower divisions with various successes along the way.

Following Croatia's independence and the establishment of new football league system in the country in 1992, Moslavina joined Treća HNL (third tier) and finished fifth in its inaugural season. The team was promoted to Druga HNL (second tier) for the 1996–97 season, but there followed a period of decline and it was only ten years later (2006–07) that Moslavina managed to return to Druga HNL. The team also managed to reach the Round of 16 in the Croatian Cup in the seasons 2005–06, 2008–09 and 2009–10, while upsetting top-flight teams like NK Zagreb or HNK Šibenik along the way. After a four-year stint in the Druga HNL, Moslavina was relegated to the Treća HNL (Division West) at the end of the 2009–10 season. The 2010–11 campaign saw Moslavina continue its poor run of form, with the team sitting bottom of the table throughout the season and eventually slipping to the Četvrta HNL (North B). Before the start of the 2011–12 season, team captain and top goalscorer Danko Cerovečki underwent a trial period with NK Varaždin and eventually signed a one-year contract with the Prva HNL team.

Due to the system change by HNS, the club continued the 2020/21 season in 4.NL Zagreb Group B, where it finished in third place. The club's exceptional success in the following season in the Croatian Football Cup, when they defeated the third division team NK Međimurje, and in the round of 16 played 1–1 with the first division team HNK Rijeka, only to be eliminated on penalties. The following year, the Orangemen reached the round of 16 again, but were eliminated by the first league team NK Slaven Belupo (2–4) after a 3–1 win against Jalžabet. Professionals Igor Tomašić and Ante Crnac began their careers here.

== Stadium ==
More informations: Gradski stadion (Kutina)

Moslavina plays its home games at the Gradski Stadion u Kutini. It can hold around 2,000 spectators.

== Supporters ==
The team's supporters are known as Gerila (Guerrilla), a group founded in the summer of 2000. The core of the fan base is usually associated with the rock, punk and metal subculture. Gerila also holds a major rivalry with HNK Segesta fans Antitalenti and NK Voloder's fans Piranje (Piranhas). They also support the regional handball club RK Moslavina.

== Honours ==
(Croatia) Treća HNL – Center:

- Winners (1): 2005–06

== Recent seasons ==
Season	League									Cup	Top goalscorer	
Season	Division	P	W	D	L	F	A	Pts	Pos	Cup	Player	Goals
2003–04	3. HNL Centre	30	8	14	8	41	38	38	9th	PR		
2004–05	3. HNL Centre	32	16	5	11	61	52	53	5th	PR		
2005–06	3. HNL Centre	30	19	7	4	64	22	64	1st ↑	R2		
2006–07	2. HNL	30	9	6	15	44	57	33	13th	PR	Danko Cerovečki	13
2007–08	2. HNL	30	11	8	11	51	42	41	9th	PR	**Marijan Maruna**	19
2008–09	2. HNL	30	7	7	16	33	51	28	15th	R2	Zoran Zekić	9
2009–10	2. HNL	26	6	6	14	25	44	24	13th ↓	R2	Danko Cerovečki	7
2010–11	3. HNL	34	7	6	21	46	89	27	18th ↓	R1	Danko Cerovečki	15

=== Key ===
1st	2nd	↑	↓
Champions	Runners-up	Promoted	Relegated

Top scorer shown in bold when he was also top scorer for the division.

- P = Played
- W = Games won
- D = Games drawn
- L = Games lost
- F = Goals for
- A = Goals against
- Pts = Points
- Pos = Final position
- 1. HNL = Prva HNL
- 2. HNL = Druga HNL
- 3. HNL = Treća HNL
- PR = Preliminary round
- R1 = Round 1
- R2 = Round 2
- QF = Quarter-finals
- SF = Semi-finals
- RU = Runners-up
- W = Winners
