= NK Radnik Velika Gorica =

Defunct association football club in Croatia

NK Radnik
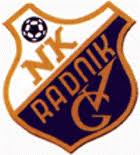
- Full name: NK Radnik Velika Gorica
- Nickname: Šljakeri ("Workers")
- Founded: 1945
- Dissolved: 2009
- Ground: Stadion Radnika
- Capacity: 10,000
Home colours	Away colours

NK Radnik was a Croatian football club based in the town of Velika Gorica in Zagreb County. Founded in 1945, it spent its entire history in lower levels, before briefly appearing in the Croatian First Football League, the nation's top flight, between 1992 and 1994.

In the summer of 2009, the club was disbanded and merged with another local club, NK Polet Buševec, to form HNK Gorica. The newly formed club will carry on Radnik's legacy as a symbol of football in Turopolje region.

== List of seasons ==
Season	League									Cup
Season	Division	P	W	D	L	F	A	Pts	Pos	Cup
1992	2. HNL North	10	7	1	2	22	9	15	1st ↑	
1992–93	1. HNL	30	9	7	14	30	52	25	13th	
1993–94	1. HNL	34	3	2	29	17	109	8	18th ↓	R1
1994–95	2. HNL West	36	16	5	15	49	47	53	7th	R1
1995–96	2. HNL West	34	10	7	17	44	55	37	13th	
1996–97	2. HNL Centre	30	11	11	8	37	24	44	6th	
1997–98	2. HNL Centre	32	16	10	6	47	27	58	6th	
1998–99	3. HNL Centre	30	12	10	8	47	38	46	7th	
1999–2000	3. HNL Centre	28	11	5	12	39	46	38	5th	R1
2000–01	3. HNL Centre	30	17	4	9	75	43	55	4th	
2001–02	3. HNL Centre	30	12	6	12	52	35	42	9th	PR
2002–03	Zagreb County	29	19	4	6	90	38	61	3rd	
2003–04	Zagreb County	30	17	6	7	63	24	57	3rd	
2004–05	Zagreb County	30	23	2	5	100	26	71	1st	
2005–06	Zagreb County	30	22	5	3	84	18	71	1st ↑	
2006–07	3. HNL West	34	12	9	13	48	46	45	14th	
2007–08	3. HNL West	34	13	5	16	47	48	44	10th	
2008–09	3. HNL West	34	11	7	16	38	46	40	15th	
