= Mahir Iftić =

Bosnian-Herzegovinian footballer

Personal information
- Full name: Mahir Iftić
- Date of birth: 17 March 1980 (age 46)
- Place of birth: SFR Yugoslavia
- Height: 1.90 m (6 ft 3 in)
- Position: Defender

Senior career*
| Years | Team | Apps | (Gls) |
| –2003 | Jedinstvo Bihać | | |
| 2003–2007 | Istra Pula | 67+ | (1+) |
| 2007–2009 | Inter Zaprešić | 37 | (0) |
| 2009–2010 | Karlovac | 10 | (0) |
| 2010 | Al Sahel | | |
| 2010–2011 | Jedinstvo Bihać | | |
| 2011 | Kufstein | 11 | (1) |
| 2012 | Vinodol | | |
| 2013–2019 | Wörgl | 153 | (19) |
- * Club domestic league appearances and goals as of 27 June 2015

Mahir Iftić (born 17 March 1980) is a Bosnian-Herzegovinian retired footballer who played as a defender.

== Club career ==
Iftić began playing football with Bosnian club NK Jedinstvo Bihać. He moved to Croatia where he would play for NK Pula, NK Inter Zaprešić and NK Karlovac in the Prva HNL. He returned to Jedinstvo Bihać in 2009, and would move to Kuwait to play for Sahel Club in September 2010. He finished his career with Austrian side SV Wörgl.
