= NK Solin =

Croatian association football club

Solin
- Full name: Nogometni klub Solin
- Founded: 1919; 107 years ago
- Ground: Stadion pokraj Jadra
- Capacity: 3,500
- Chairman: Miroslav Dugeč
- Head coach: Boris Pavić
- League: Second League (III)
- 2024-25: 5th
- Website: www.nksolin.hr
Home colours	Away colours

NK Solin is a Croatian football club based in the town of Solin, near Split, playing in the 2. NL, the Croatian third division.

== History ==
Arguably the team's greatest success was winning the 1980–81 Croatian league, which earned Solin promotion to the 1981–82 Yugoslav Second League. They would play two seasons in the second division.

The club was named MAR Solin from 1991 to 1994 and NK Solin Kaltenberg from 1995 to 1997.

As of 2019, the club have played in the 2.HNL for all but two seasons since Croatian independence.

== Players ==
=== Current squad ===
Note: Flags indicate national team as defined under FIFA eligibility rules; some limited exceptions apply. Players may hold more than one non-FIFA nationality.

No.	Pos.	Nation	Player
—	GK	CRO	Ivan Kargotić
—	MF	CRO	Dinko Kuzmić
—	DF	CRO	Marino Komić
—	DF	CRO	Mateo Tomić
—	FW	CRO	Nino Majdov
—	DF	CRO	Tvrtko Buljan
—	GK	CRO	Bozidar Radosevic
—	FW	CRO	Josip Tarabarić
—	MF	CRO	Tin Jukić-Peladić
—	FW	CRO	Emanuel Nikpalj
—	GK	UKR	Stanislav Sytnyk
—	MF	CRO	Dino Kegalj

No.	Pos.	Nation	Player
—	MF	CRO	Tonći Mujan
—	MF	CRO	Petar Mišković (on loan from Sarajevo)
—	DF	CRO	Petar Vuko
—	FW	CRO	Petar Perko
—	MF	CRO	Lovre Borovičkić
—	MF	CRO	Mirko Maric
—	DF	CRO	Toni Mršić
—	DF	CRO	Nediljko Stjepanović
—	DF	BIH	Domagoj Marušić
—	FW	CRO	Andro Marušić
—	FW	UKR	Ivan Matyazh
—	FW	CRO	Ante Vuco
—	MF	CRO	Marko Matijašević
—	FW	CRO	Marino Bilušić

== Recent seasons ==
Season	League									Cup
Season	Division	P	W	D	L	F	A	Pts	Pos	Cup
1992	2. HNL South	14	10	3	1	23	7	23	1st	
1992–93	2. HNL South	30	16	11	3	39	20	43	3rd	
1993–94	2. HNL South	30	6	12	12	35	39	24	12th	
1994–95	2. HNL South	32	16	9	7	54	27	57	3rd	
1995–96	2. HNL South	30	16	9	5	50	24	57	3rd	
1996–97	2. HNL South	34	15	8	11	56	36	53	9th	R1
1997–98	2. HNL South	32	18	9	5	51	25	63	3rd	
1998–99	2. HNL	36	14	6	16	49	49	48	11th	
1999–2000	2. HNL	32	15	6	11	53	42	51	8th	
2000–01	2. HNL	34	14	9	11	44	46	51	7th	
2001–02	2. HNL South	30	13	9	8	44	24	48	5th	
2002–03	2. HNL South	32	11	8	13	45	47	41	5th	
2003–04	2. HNL South	32	15	3	14	56	47	48	5th	
2004–05	2. HNL South	32	14	8	10	54	53	50	3rd	
2005–06	2. HNL South	32	13	6	13	60	50	45	9th	
2006–07	2. HNL	30	16	5	9	58	33	53	5th	
2007–08	2. HNL	30	10	7	13	46	48	37	12th	
2008–09	2. HNL	30	14	5	11	37	31	47	7th	
2009–10	2. HNL	26	10	10	6	29	22	40	5th	
2010–11	2. HNL	30	13	6	11	35	33	45	6th	
2011–12	2. HNL	28	10	5	13	35	45	35	11th	
2012–13	2. HNL	30	14	9	7	43	39	51	2nd	
2013–14	2. HNL	33	7	13	13	26	47	34	11th ↓	
2014–15	3. HNL South	34	19	11	4	63	30	68	2nd	
2015–16	3. HNL South	34	21	5	8	46	26	68	1st ↑	
2016–17	2. HNL	33	16	7	10	40	36	55	3rd	R2
2017–18	2. HNL	33	9	7	17	31	48	34	9th	
2018–19	2. HNL	26	5	13	8	24	31	28	10th	
