= NK Croatia Sesvete =

Croatian football club

Croatia Sesvete
- Full name: Nogometni klub Croatia Sesvete
- Founded: 1957 (as NK Sljeme)
- Dissolved: 2012
- Ground: Stadion ŠRC Sesvete
- Capacity: 3,500
- 2011–12: 2. HNL, 15th (relegated)
Home colours	Away colours

NK Croatia Sesvete was a Croatian football club based in the Sesvete district of the City of Zagreb.

Previous club names: NK Sljeme (1957–1988), NK Sesvete (1988–1996), NK Badel Sesvete (1996–1997), NK Sesvete (1997–1998).

The club was dissolved in 2012 due to financial irregularities. Newly formed NK Croatia Prigorje is seen as club's spiritual successor.

== 2010 Match fixing scandal ==
In June 2010 Croatian Police started making arrests connected to match fixing in the Croatian League. 20 players in total, including 9 players from Croatia Sesvete were arrested. The nine were: Miljenko Bošnjak, Goran Jerković, Saša Mus, Ante Pokrajčić, Mario Čižmek, Marko Guja, Ivan Banović and Dario Šušak. It was also claimed by the police that 7 of Sesvete's 8 last matches in the league were fixed. The players received up to 40 thousand euros for the match-fixing. In some cases, players even made "safe" bets on their own games.

== Honours ==
- Druga HNL
  - Champions (1): 2007–08

== Recent seasons ==
Season	League									Cup	Top goalscorer	
Season	Division	P	W	D	L	F	A	Pts	Pos	Cup	Player	Goals
1992												
1992–93												
1993–94												
1994–95	2. HNL West	36	20	9	7	77	38	69	3rd			
1995–96	2. HNL West	34	12	4	18	46	64	40	12th			
1996–97	2. HNL Centre	30	19	3	8	53	32	60	2nd			
1997–98	2. HNL Centre	32	20	6	6	66	28	66	5th	QF		
1998–99	2. HNL	36	14	6	16	52	56	48	12th			
1999–2000	2. HNL	32	9	7	16	38	48	34	12th			
2000–01	2. HNL	34	18	7	9	40	30	61	3rd	PR		
2001–02	2. HNL South	30	13	6	11	33	29	45	7th	R1		
2002–03	2. HNL South	32	12	8	12	43	52	44	4th	R1		
2003–04	2. HNL South	32	11	8	13	40	47	41	9th	R2		
2004–05	2. HNL South	32	10	8	14	41	47	38	9th		Jure Guvo	8
2005–06	2. HNL South	32	18	5	9	61	42	59	2nd		Zdravko Popović	21
2006–07	2. HNL	30	18	5	7	67	38	59	3rd	R1	**Zdravko Popović**	30
2007–08	2. HNL	30	20	6	4	67	25	66	1st ↑	R2	Ivica Karabogdan, Vladimir Petrović	11
2008–09	1. HNL	33	6	8	19	31	66	25	12th		Vladimir Petrović	5
2009–10	1. HNL	30	3	5	22	30	81	14	16th ↓	R1	Ante Pokrajčić	6
2010–11	2. HNL	30	12	4	14	37	41	40	11th		Tomi Juric	12
2011–12	2. HNL	28	4	4	20	23	52	15	15th ↓		Franjo Tepurić	6

=== Key ===
1st	2nd	↑	↓
Champions	Runners-up	Promoted	Relegated

Top scorer shown in bold when he was also top scorer for the division.

- P = Played
- W = Games won
- D = Games drawn
- L = Games lost
- F = Goals for
- A = Goals against
- Pts = Points
- Pos = Final position
- 1. HNL = Prva HNL
- 2. HNL = Druga HNL
- 3. HNL = Treća HNL
- PR = Preliminary round
- R1 = Round 1
- R2 = Round 2
- QF = Quarter-finals
- SF = Semi-finals
- RU = Runners-up
- W = Winners
