= NK Belišće =

Association football club in Croatia

- Full name: Nogometni klub Belišće
- Founded: 1919; 106 years ago
- Ground: Gradski stadion Belišće
- Capacity: 3,000
- Chairman: Romano Klanjšćek
- Manager: Dino Gavrić
- League: Third Football League (IV)
- 2024-25: TBA
Home colours	Away colours

NK Belišće is a Croatian football club based in the town of Belišće.

== History ==
NK Belišće was founded in 1919 under the name BŠK (Belišćanski športski klub). The club's name was changed in 1925 to BRŠK (Belišćanski radnički športski klub). During World War II the club was named Viktorija. From 1945 until the 1960 club was called FD Proleter and from 1960 carries the current name. The club from its beginnings until today, closely related to the factory "Belišće" d.d.

== Stadium ==
NK Belišće host domestic matches at Gradski stadion Belišće which has a capacity of 3,000. The stadium was improved with a new grandstand in 2019 to celebrate the club's 100th anniversary and to ensure the club qualified to play in the 2. HNL.

== Supporters ==
The team's fans are known as Baraberi. The most passionate group of Baraberi encourages their favorites wherever they played, and on the home match at the Gradski stadion is located on the eastern stand.

== Recent seasons ==
Season	Division	P	W	D	L	F	A	Pts	Pos	Cup
Season	League									Cup
1992–93	1. HNL	30	8	9	13	34	50	25	15th	
1993–94	1. HNL	34	12	8	14	55	51	32	12th	R2
1994–95	1. HNL	30	4	4	22	26	69	16	16th	R2
1995–96	1. B HNL	32	11	8	13	42	45	41	4th	R2
1996–97	1. B HNL	30	12	8	10	41	35	44	7th	R2
1997–98	2. HNL East	30	21	6	3	68	21	69	2nd	R1
1998–99	2. HNL	36	17	8	11	67	50	59	6th	QF
1999–2000	2. HNL	32	11	6	15	42	43	39	10th	R1
2000–01	2. HNL	34	16	7	11	48	35	55	6th	R1
2001–02	2. HNL North	30	21	5	4	74	26	68	2nd	R2
2002–03	2. HNL North	32	19	8	5	62	24	65	2nd	R2
2003–04	2. HNL North	32	19	8	5	66	27	65	2nd	R1
2004–05	2. HNL North	32	12	7	13	48	41	43	4th	R2
2005–06	2. HNL North	32	18	7	7	52	27	61	1st	R1
2006–07	2. HNL	30	11	9	10	46	40	42	7th	R2
2007–08	2. HNL	30	3	7	20	23	53	16	16th	R1
2008–09	3. HNL East	33	10	2	21	48	66	32	17th	R1
2009–10	3. HNL East	34	16	5	13	51	36	53	8th	R1
2010–11	3. HNL East	34	16	3	15	49	48	51	9th	
2011–12	3. HNL East	29	12	7	10	41	33	43	5th	PR
2012–13	3. HNL East	30	11	4	15	26	44	37	12th	PR
2013–14	3. HNL East	29	12	5	12	49	38	40	9th	
2014–15	3. HNL East	30	12	7	11	53	45	43	7th	
2015–16	3. HNL East	30	16	6	8	58	29	54	4th	
2016–17	3. HNL East	30	8	6	16	38	43	30	14th	
2017–18	3. HNL East	30	8	5	17	28	58	29	14th	
2018–19	3. HNL East	30	14	6	10	53	39	48	4th	
2019–20	3. HNL East	17	11	2	4	42	18	35	2nd	R2
2020–21	3. HNL East	34	22	9	3	72	24	75	1st	PR
2021–22	3. HNL East	34	23	6	5	95	28	75	3rd	R2
2022–23	2. NL	30	10	7	13	39	47	37	9th	R1

== Current squad ==
As of 4 February 2023

Note: Flags indicate national team as defined under FIFA eligibility rules; some limited exceptions apply. Players may hold more than one non-FIFA nationality.

No.	Pos.	Nation	Player
1	GK	CRO	Antonio Vranjković
2	MF	CRO	Borna Matasović
3	DF	GRE	Christos Mitsis
4	DF	SEN	Papa Mamadou Seck
5	DF	CRO	Ivan Lacković
7	DF	CRO	Dino Bognar
8	MF	KOR	Sanghun Seok
9	FW	CRO	Filip Radovanović
10	MF	CRO	Silvio Anočić
11	FW	CRO	Deni Stojanac
12	GK	CRO	Frane Barbić

No.	Pos.	Nation	Player
13	FW	CRO	Luka Conjar
14	FW	CRO	Marko Kalanj
15	MF	CRO	Luka Grgić
16	DF	CRO	Fabio Horaček
17	MF	CRO	Vedran Mlinarić
18	FW	ATG	D'Andre Bishop
19	MF	CRO	Leon Milišić-Zečević
20	MF	CRO	Andrej Kovačić
21	MF	CRO	Edi Pavlović
22	DF	CRO	Marko Gazić
23	DF	CRO	Mario Bačić
