= Stadion ŠRC Sesvete =

Football stadium in Sesvete, Croatia

Coordinates: 45°50′11″N 16°06′27″E

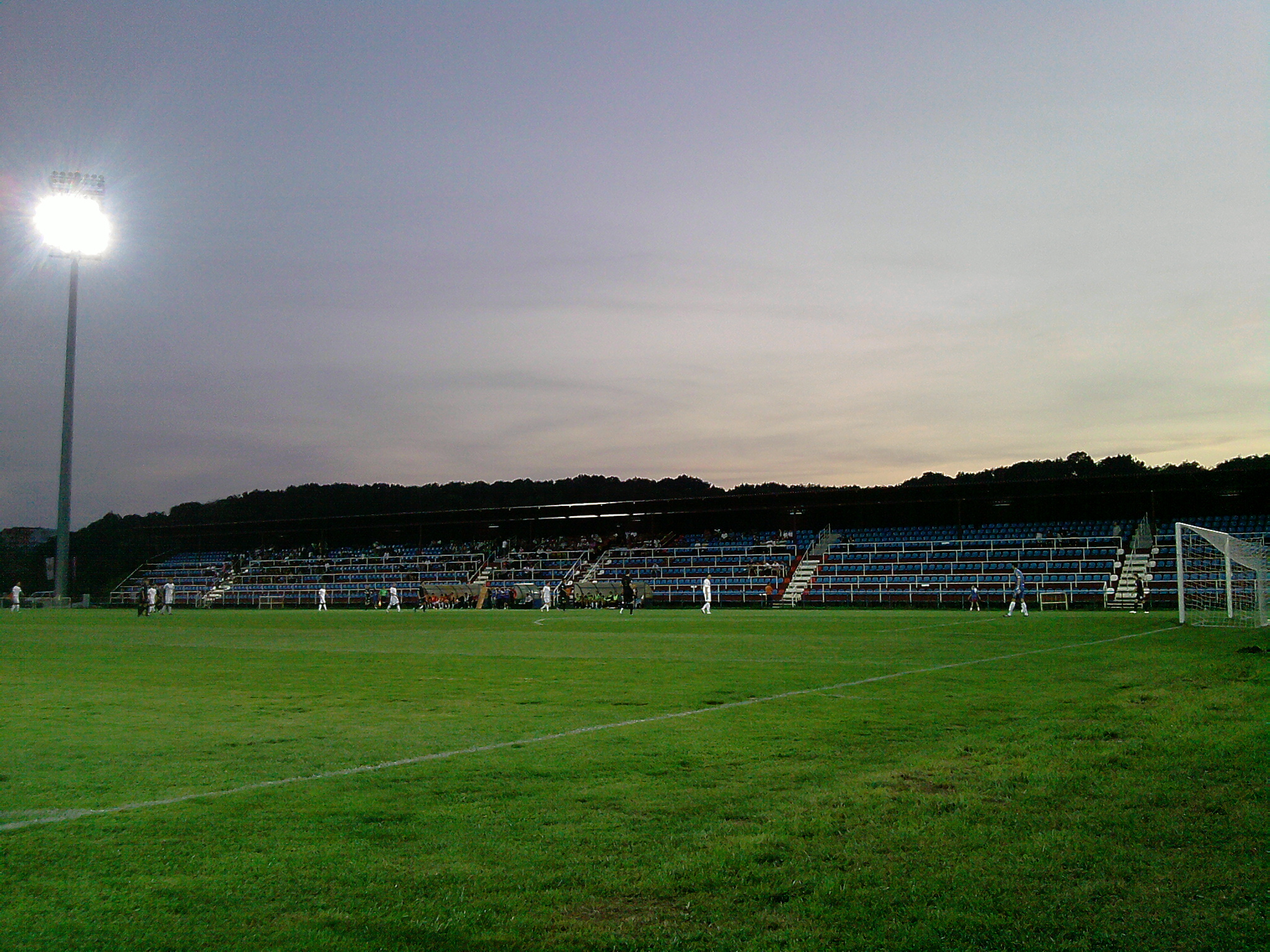
SRC Sesvete

Stadion SRC Sesvete is a football stadium in Sesvete, Croatia. It serves as home stadium for football club NK Sesvete. The stadium has an all seater capacity of 3,500 spectators.
