= Stadion Gospin dolac =

Football stadium in Imotski, Croatia

Coordinates: 43°26′58″N 17°12′54″E

Gospin dolac
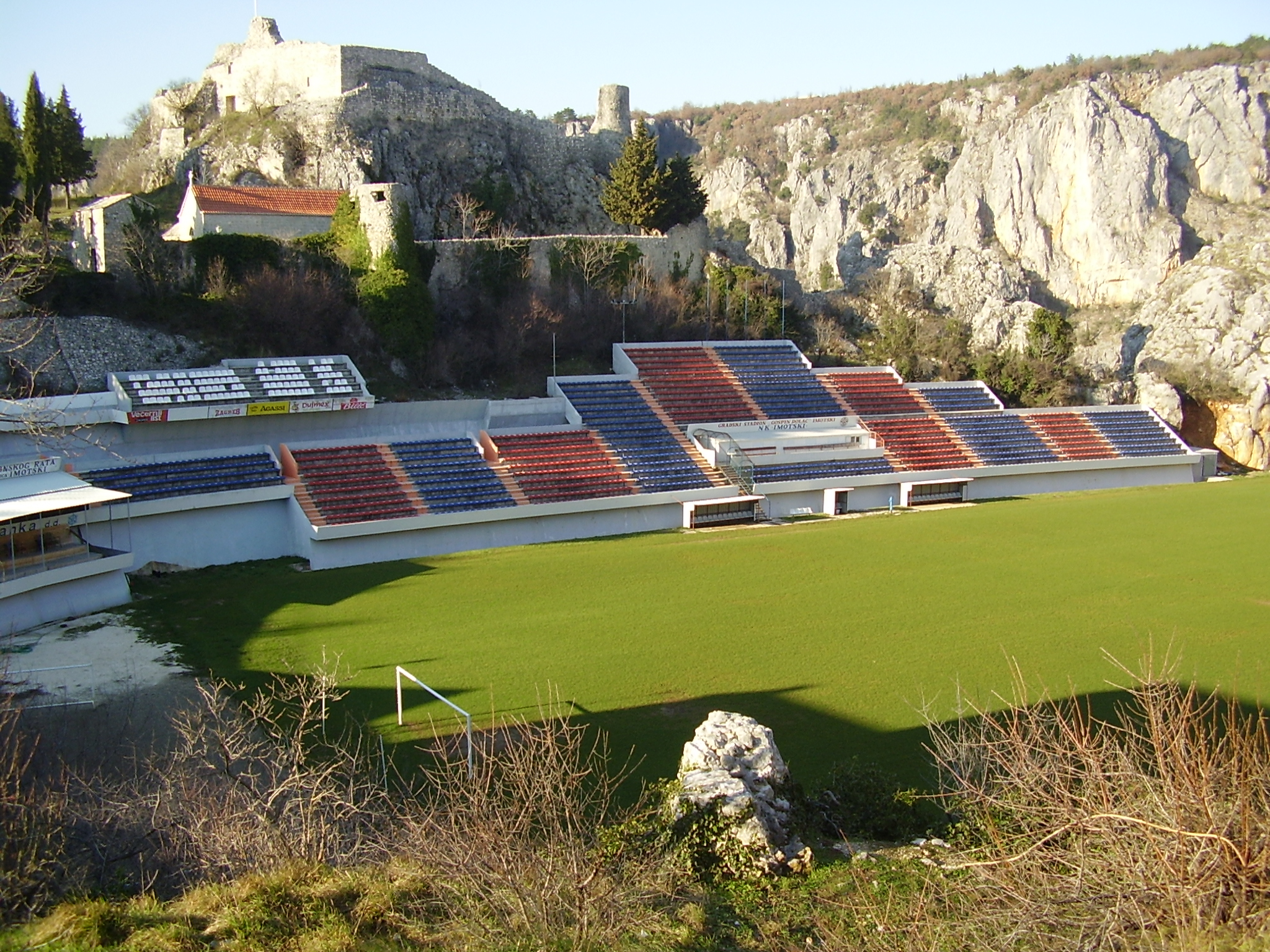
- Interactive map of Gospin dolac
- Full name: Stadion Gospin dolac
- Location: Imotski, Croatia
- Owner: NK Imotski
- Capacity: 4,000
- Surface: Grass

Construction
- Built: 1989

Tenants
- NK Imotski; NK Imotski 1991 (youth)

Gospin dolac is a football stadium in Imotski, Croatia. It was built in 1989 and serves as a home stadium for NK Imotski. The stadium has a capacity of 4,000 spectators.

The stadium is named after a nearby church. The stadium was named one of the top ten most beautiful in the world by the BBC in 2017. Other media sources such as oddee.com and Copa 90 have also listed the stadium as one of the most beautiful or architecturally interesting stadiums in the world.

The idea for the stadium dates back to the 1950s. Construction started in 1976 in a natural dome in the karst, and the stadium finally opened in 1989. The stadium is close to Lake Modro and an Illyrian fortress.
