= HNK Segesta =

HNK Segesta Sisak
- Full name: Hrvatski nogometni klub Segesta Sisak (Croatian Football Club Segesta Sisak)
- Nickname: Stara dama (The Old Lady)
- Short name: SEG
- Founded: 1906; 120 years ago
- Ground: Gradski stadion, Sisak
- Capacity: 8,442
- President: Marko Medarić
- Manager: Damir Milinović
- League: 1. NL
- 2025-26: 2. NL, 1st of 16
- Website: http://www.hnk-segesta.hr
Home colours	Away colours

Hrvatski nogometni klub Segesta Sisak (English: Croatian Football Club Segesta Sisak), commonly referred to as HNK Segesta Sisak or simply Segesta Sisak is a Croatian professional football club located in the city of Sisak. It is named after the Illyrian settlement Segestica from which the modern town of Sisak developed. Founded in 1906, The Old Lady is the oldest Croatian club that still exists under its original name.

FŠK Segesta Sisak was founded around the end of June 1906, spending most of the Interwar period in the lower divisions of the Kingdom of Yugoslavia. With the arrival of the communist regime in 1945, the club changed its name several times, settling on SD Naprijed Sisak in 1946. However, in the middle of the 1952 season they changed it back to NK Segesta Sisak. Throughout the Cold War Segesta competed in the third Yugoslav division, with short stints in the Second Federal League.

After the Republic of Croatia achieved its independence in 1991, Segesta played five consecutive seasons in the top division and even made it to the final of the 1996 UEFA Intertoto Cup. In the 1996/97 First Croatian League season they finished 11th and after losing in the playoffs they were relegated to the Second Croatian League, never again returning to the Croatian top flight. Today they compete in the Third Croatian League, the 4th division of Croatian football.

== History ==
=== Origins (1906-1918) ===
The most important information about the club and people who founded can be found on the occasion of the celebration of its 20th anniversary. That anniversary was marked from the 26th to the 29th of June 1927, when the first club ground was also inaugurated. The event was covered by the local weekly magazine "Hrvatske novine" and some of the original founders were interviewed. The story goes that the club was created in late June or early July 1906 by a group of school students: 13 year old Ivo Stipčić and about twenty of his friends gathered at Ivo's uncle Ivan Šešek's inn (today's Ivana Kukuljevića-Sakcinskog Street, number 4), and decided to found a football club. The founders agreed that the first president of the club would be the owner of the ball, Ivo Stipčić, and "Segesta" was chosen as the name of the club after the name of the old Celtic-Illyrian settlement in the area of Sisak — Segestika. Since the members of the club were mostly pupils and students who stayed in Sisak only during the summer school holidays, it was named Ferijalni športski klub Segesta Sisak (Holiday Sports Club "Segesta" Sisak).

The first written trace of "Segesta" can be found in the weekly "Novi Sisački Glas" from the 15th of August 1909, when Segesta played a match against Concordia Zagreb. In a 1912 edition of the weekly magazine "Sisak" featured a list of Sisak-based football clubs, and Segesta is said to exist only through holidays, and the following year the weekly "Posavac" says of Segesta that it was "the first club in Sisak" and that it "kept somewhat afloat and functioned". The Zagreb-based newspaper Šport mentions Segesta in 1919 as "the first Sisak-based club, the Holiday Sports Club Segesta". Thus the precise and real founding date is not sure, due to a lack of any documentation about the happening.

=== Interwar period and WWII (1918-1945) ===
The name Holiday Sports Club Segesta Sisak hung around until 1920, when at the annual club meeting on the 1st of August it was decided that the club will register in the Yugoslav football association as Športski klub Segesta Sisak (Sports Club Segesta Sisak). That decision was finalised on the 14th February 1921 and since then Segesta participated in every season of the Yugoslav Football Championship until 1941, and the Croatian Football League until 1944.

The club's first success came in their inaugural season in the YFA. They placed first in Sisak's local league, but lost to ŠK Krajišnik Banja Luka in the quarter-finals of the provincial playoffs. On the 1st of March 1925 the club changed its name for the second time to Građanski športski klub Segesta Sisak (Citizens' Sports Club Segesta Sisak) to gather the following of the citizens of Sisak. They reached the quarter-finals again in the 1926/27 season, but lost to ŠK Proleter Slavonski Brod.

The thirties was the most successful era of the club before WWII. That was the time that the club solidified itself as the biggest club in Sisak, in front of rivals Slavija and Viktorija, but also as the team to beat in the region, as they won three consecutive Provincial Championships of the Zagreb Football Association from 1930/31 to 1932/33, being the only team ever to do so. Being a provincial champion of the ZFA in those times meant Segesta was one of the better teams in Croatia and parts of Bosnia and Herzegovina. The quality of the team was ripe for a spot in the National League, but that dream never came to fruition. In September 1939 the club changed its name once again into Hrvatski građanski športski klub Segesta Sisak (Croatian Citizens' Sports Club Segesta Sisak) as Yugoslavia steered further into nationalism.

=== Post-war era (1945-1991) ===
With the establishment of the communist regime in Yugoslavia, Segesta, as all other sport clubs in the country gets dissolved by the communist authorities, only for Sport Club Naprijed to be established in its place. The club will play as Naprijed between 1946 and 1952, when it is renamed Segesta again and since then it plays in the lower leagues of the Yugoslav competitions. In the 1977/78 season, Segesta achieved great success by winning the title of Croatian champion-region north. With this success, she achieved the right to play in the finals of the Croatian Championship with the champion of the Croatian Football League - Region South, NK Solin. That match was automatically a qualification to enter the 2nd Federal Football League. The first match was played in Sisak on June 18, 1978. There were about eight thousand spectators at the "Bratstvo-jedinstvo" stadium, and Segesta won 2–0 with goals from Josip Cavrić. In the return match in Solin, the hosts won 1–0, which was enough for Segesti to celebrate the club's greatest success since World War II. In 1978, Segesta achieved another notable result, when the club won the title of Croatian amateur champion.

=== In independent Croatia (1991-1996) ===
On the 3rd of March 1992 a meeting of the board was held, where it was decided to change the club name to Hrvatski nogometni klub Segesta Sisak (Croatian Football Club Segesta Sisak). They started their time in the Croatian football federation with a season in the Druga HNL — North, Croatia's second division, finishing the season in 4th place. The following season the Prva HNL, Croatia's first divion was expanded to hold 16 teams, including Segesta.

As the siege of Sisak was ongoing in the Croatian war of independence, Segesta's city rival NK Metalac Sisak froze its operations in the CFF for a year because of frequent bombing raids. The "Blue Thunder" from Sisak's southern district Caprag made it possible for Segesta to enter the first division. Their best sports staff, coaches and players that didn't have military duties moved to their rival Segesta as the Old Lady started preparing for their first top flight campaign ever.

The 90s are considered to be the golden era of Segesta's rich history. In their first Prva HNL season in 1992/93 they managed a solid 10th spot with manager Zlatko Kranjčar at the helm.They improved to 9th in the 1993/94 season as they reached the quarterfinals of the Croatian Football Cup, and in 1994/95 under new manager Milivoj Bračun reached an excellent 8th place, with the help of Alen Peternac's 13 goals.

In the 1995/96 season, the Prva HNL was repurposed again. In the first part of the season Segesta managed an incredible 6th place, with a Prva A HNL joint best 6:0 home win against NK Rijeka, nearly missing out on the championship group but earning themselves a spot in the UEFA Intertoto Cup. After a 2nd-place finish in the Prva A HNL playoff (8th altogether) and a successful European run, Segesta finished the best season in club history.

=== The 1996 UEFA Intertoto Cup ===
Taking 6th place in the first part of the 1995/96 1. HNL season, Segesta also qualified for the UEFA Intertoto Cup. On the 29th of June 1996 Segesta played their first official European match. In Sisak, in front of 1,500 spectators they managed a 1:1 draw against Swedish side Örgryte IS Göteborg. After a victorious trip to Israel against Hapoel Tel Aviv they extended their streak to 3 after wins against Stade Rennais and Luzern. Without losing a single game they finished the group stage in 1st place and qualified for the knockout stage.

Their semi-finals opponent was another Swedish side, Örebro SK. The first leg was a 4:0 win featuring a Hari Vukas hat-trick, and a 1:4 defeat away from home was enough to go through to the finals. With that finals berth Segesta became the first Croatian club to qualify for a final of a UEFA club competition. The first leg of the final was played on the 6th of August in Sisak against Danish side Silkeborg IF. 2 quick goals by the Danes were enough as Segesta only managed an 89th minute consolation. The second leg in Denmark on the 20th of August ended with a single goal by Šašivarević, which made the final score 2:2, however Silkeborg took the trophy because of the away goal rule.

=== Collapse (1996-2006) ===
The 1996/97 season spelled trouble for Segesta. The return of Zlatko Kranjčar as manager didn't show results as Segesta ended the first half of the season in 11th. In Group A of the relegation playoffs, Segesta faced off against Cibalia and Slaven. All three games ended as 1:1 draws, so the ties were replayed. In the replay, Segesta once again drew both matches, but Slaven beat Cibalia, and Segesta was relegated from the Prva HNL after five seasons in the top flight.

The following season they won the Druga HNL — Središte title, but lost in the promotion playoffs to familiar foes Cibalia. After a second match against Mladost Suhopolje and a second loss in the playoffs, they solidified their place in the second division for years to come. In the 1998/99 season they once again reached the quarter-finals of the Croatian Football Cup. In 2001/02, they are relegated to the third division for the first time since Croatian independence, but were promoted right back after winning the 2002/03 Treća HNL — Središte title. Two seasons later and another relegation to the third division in 2005/06 was followed by another promotion back to the second division after a playoff win against NK Suhopolje, and for the first time since 1997/98, the club had stability, staying in the second flight for 7 consecutive seasons.

=== 100th and 110th anniversary (2006-2016) ===
The 100 year anniversary of the club was celebrated on the 30th of August 2006 with a match against the Croatian national football team. The national team won 6:2 with goals by Eduardo, Klasnić, Modrić and Balaban. The scorers for the hosts were Deronjić and Šenija. The formal board meeting held on the 26th of September saw Segesta's all-time best players, managers and staff receive awards. Among the players were Slavko Draženović, Ivan Sertić, Dubravko Kahler, Željko Plepelić, Milan Radojčić, Branimir Agarević, Zoran Buinac, Nikica Valent, Josip Cavrić, Danijel Kukić and Damir Stefanovič, as well as Rudolf Draženović, the oldest living Segesta player. Managers Stjepan Grgec and Nikola Dobranić also received awards, as well as presidents Vladimir Posavec, Dragan Boižić and Đuro Brodarac.

The 2007/08 hosted a good cup campaign, as the club reached their first quarter-final since the 1998/99 season. In the 2009/10 season Segesta was, after seven seasons once again relegated from Druga HNL. In November 2011, after a bad season in the third division, recent player and Segesta captain stepped into the manager role. Come 2012/13, Segesta won the Treća HNL — Središte, ten years after their previous success. In the playoffs they beat HNK Val and earned promotion spot. After two successful seasons in the second flight, with respective 6th and 8th finishes, they are once again relegated to the third division in the 2015/16 season.

On the 31st of August 2016, the Croatian national football team was once again welcomed in Sisak to commemorate Segesta's 110th anniversary. The national team won 8:1, with goals by Mario Mandžukić, Andrej Kramarić, Ivan Perišić, Nikola Kalinić and Duje Čop, with the single goal for Segesta scored by Luka Kožić.

=== Recent years (2016-present) ===
In the 2017/18 season Segesta completed their worst season since WWII, as they were relegated from the third division of Croatian football. With that result they became a part of the Četvrta NL — Središte Zagreb, a regional semi-professional division. There they spent two seasons, and won promotion back to the Treća HNL in 2019/20. In the 2021/22 season Segesta finished 17th, and, with the expansion of the third flight into a single unified league, were once again demoted into the fourth division, where they are now playing. From the 2024/25 season, it will once again compete in the third tier of Croatian football, this time in the 2nd NL. After a complete change of management in the summer of 2025, Segesta, with new management and coach Damir Milinović, enters the 2nd NL season uncertainly, which it eventually wins with 65 points and enters the 1st NL, the second tier of competition in Croatian club football.

== Honours ==
=== Domestic ===
- 2. HNL/ 1. NL:
  - Winner (1): 1997-98 (Center)
- 3. HNL/ 2. NL:
  - Winner (3): 2002–03, 2012–13 (Center), 2025–26
- 4. HNL:
  - Winner (1): 2023–24 (Center)
  - Runner-up (1): 2006-07 (West)

=== International ===
- UEFA Intertoto Cup:
  - Runner-up (1): 1996

== Crest and colours ==
The colours that marked Segesta's history are red and white. Throughout the club's history, they mostly played in red and white striped kits, symbolising the colours of Pannonian Croatia. Depending on the club's financial situation they've had several different kit manufacturers, with some of the more famous ones being Umbro, Legea and Diadora. One of the more famous main sponsors to feature on the kit is Croatian oil giant INA.

Segesta's crest is a shield divided into two parts. The top part features Segesta's red and white stripes and the Croatian chequy, divided by the club name. The bottom part is the city emblem of Sisak, Sisak's old city. This crest has been in use since the early 90s, or rather since the independence of Croatia.

== League record ==
=== Croatian football league 1992 – today ===
Season	Division	P	W	D	L	F	A	Pts	Pos
1992	2. HNL North	10	4	0	6	12	13	8	4th ↑
1992–93	1. HNL	30	10	5	15	31	44	25	10th
1993–94	1. HNL	34	12	10	12	48	44	34	9th
1994–95	1. HNL	30	10	8	12	32	31	38	8th
1995–96	1. A HNL	36	14	7	15	51	53	56	8th
1996–97	1. A HNL	30	9	12	9	35	34	39	11th ↓
1997–98	2. HNL Centre	32	21	7	4	71	15	70	1st
1998–99	2. HNL	36	22	4	10	84	34	70	3rd
1999–2000	2. HNL	32	15	11	6	58	29	56	6th
2000–01	2. HNL	34	13	7	14	38	47	46	11th
2001–02	2. HNL South	30	9	8	13	25	33	35	13th ↓
2002–03	3. HNL Centre	30	20	8	2	71	25	68	1st ↑
2003–04	2. HNL South	32	15	4	13	51	46	49	3rd
2004–05	2. HNL South	32	12	12	8	51	38	48	5th
2005–06	2. HNL South	32	9	4	19	34	59	31	11th ↓
2006–07	3. HNL West	34	18	8	8	72	39	62	2nd ↑
2007–08	2. HNL	30	11	10	9	39	37	43	7th
2008–09	2. HNL	30	8	9	13	33	47	33	11th
2009–10	2. HNL	26	4	4	18	17	46	16	14th ↓
2010–11	3. HNL West	30	14	8	12	51	48	50	8th
2011–12	3. HNL West	34	12	12	10	44	47	48	6th
2012–13	3. HNL Center	30	22	2	6	80	35	68	1st ↑
2013–14	2. HNL	33	13	7	13	40	39	46	6th
2014–15	2. HNL	30	9	7	14	31	42	34	8th
2015–16	2. HNL	33	10	8	15	44	54	38	11th ↓
2016–17	3. HNL West	30	8	12	10	45	53	36	11th
2017–18	3. HNL West	34	9	4	21	36	76	31	18th ↓
2018–19	4. HNL - Center	30	17	3	10	55	43	54	5th
2019–20*	4. HNL - Center	16	8	3	5	31	20	27	5th ↑
2020–21	3. HNL - Center	34	10	8	16	43	59	38	13th
2021–22	3. HNL - Center	34	6	8	20	33	76	26	17th
2022–23	3. NL - Center	34	14	6	14	57	40	48	7th
2023–24	3. NL - Center	34	24	5	5	97	42	77	1st ↑
2024–25	2. NL	30	10	4	16	50	69	34	11th
2025–26	2. NL	30	21	2	7	58	33	65	1st ↑

- – COVID-19 season

=== Key ===
1st	2nd	↑	↓
Champions	Runners-up	Promoted	Relegated

Top scorer shown in bold when he was also top scorer for the division.

- P = Played
- W = Games won
- D = Games drawn
- L = Games lost
- F = Goals for
- A = Goals against
- Pts = Points
- Pos = Final position
- 1. HNL = Prva HNL
- 2. HNL = Druga HNL
- 3. HNL = Treća HNL
- 4. HNL = Četvrta HNL
- GS = Group Stage
- PR = Preliminary round
- R1 = Round 1
- R2 = Round 2
- QF = Quarter-finals
- SF = Semi-finals
- RU = Runners-up
- W = Winners

== Cup record ==
=== Yugoslav cup ===
Season	Round	Opponent	Result
1947	1st preliminary round	NK Rudar Trbovlje	2:2 (aet.)
1948	1st preliminary round	NK Železničar Maribor	4:2
1948	2nd preliminary round	FK Spartak Subotica	1:4
1949	Round of 32	FK Budućnost Titograd	0:3
1951	Round of 64	NK Borac Zagreb	1:0
1951	Round of 32	NK Metalac Zagreb	1:2
1981–82	Round of 32	GNK Dinamo Zagreb	0:4

=== Croatian football cup ===
Season	Round	Opponent	Result
1992–93	Round of 32	Rijeka	2:2, 1:2
1993–94	Round of 32	Mladost Cernik	3:1, 14:0
1993–94	Round of 16	Inker Zaprešić	2:3, 1:0
1993–94	Quarter-finals	Zagreb	2:2, 1:3
1994–95	Round of 32	Regeneracija-Mladost Zabok	7:0, 8:0
1994–95	Round of 16	Zadar	1:0, 1:0
1994–95	Quarter-finals	Hajduk Split	1:1, 0:3
1995–96	Round of 32	Karlovac	2:0, 7:0
1995–96	Round of 16	Zagreb	2:0, 1:4
1996–97	Round of 32	Napredak Velika Mlaka	3:2
1996–97	Round of 16	Osijek	0:3
1997–98	Round of 32	Jadran Poreč	1:2
1998–99	Round of 32	Moslavina Kutina	3:2
1998–99	Round of 16	Raštane Zadar	4:0
1998–99	Quarter-finals	Slaven Belupo Koprivnica	1:4, 0:1
1999-00	Round of 32	Mosor Žrnovnica	5:6 (pen.)
2000–01	Round of 32	Sloboda Varaždin	2:1
2000–01	Round of 16	Zagreb	0:2
2001-02	Round of 32	TŠK Topolovac	3:5
2002–03	Round of 32	TŠK Topolovac	0:1
2003–04	Round of 32	Zadar	1:4
2005–06	Preliminary round	Bjelovar	3:2
2005–06	Round of 32	Belišće	1:0
2005–06	Round of 16	Hajduk Split	1:2 (prod.)
2006–07	Preliminary round	Vodice	3:2
2006–07	Round of 32	Zadar	3:1
2006–07	Round of 16	Konavljanin Čilipi	0:2
2007–08	Preliminary round	Čakovec	1:0
2007–08	Round of 32	Zadar	1:0
2007–08	Round of 16	Rijeka	3:0
2007–08	Quarter-finals	Zagreb	0:0, 2:3
2009–10	Round of 32	Nehaj Senj	1:0 (prod.)
2009–10	Round of 16	Zagreb	1:3
2010–11	Round of 32	Suhopolje	1:3
2011–12	Round of 32	Split	0:5
2012–13	Round of 32	Lokomotiva Zagreb	2:4
2013–14	Round of 32	Zadar	0:2
2014–15	Preliminary round	Mladost Ždralovi	3:1
2014–15	Round of 32	Split	0:2
2015–16	Preliminary round	Mladost Ždralovi	0:1
2018–19	Preliminary round	Slavija Pleternica	0:1
2019–20	Preliminary round	Hrvace	1:3
2020–21	Preliminary round	Croatia Zmijavci	3:4
2026–27	Preliminary round	Slatina	18:0
2026–27	Round of 32	Osijek	3:1
2026–27	Round of 16	Rudeš	?:?

== European record ==
Segesta qualified for the 1996 UEFA Intertoto Cup, after placing 8th in the 1. HNL, reaching the final stage before losing over two legs to Silkeborg IF on the away goals rule. To this day Segesta is the only Croatian club to have reached a UEFA European club competition final.

=== Summary ===
Competition	Pld	W	D	L	GF	GA	Last season played
UEFA Intertoto Cup	8	5	1	2	14	9	1996
Total	8	5	1	2	14	9	–

Pld = Matches played; W = Matches won; D = Matches drawn; L = Matches lost; GF = Goals for; GA = Goals against. Defunct competitions indicated in italics.

=== By season ===
Season	Competition	Round	Opponent	Home	Away	Agg.
1996	Intertoto Cup	Group; 6	(Sweden) Örgryte	1–1	–	–
1996	Intertoto Cup	Group; 6	(Israel) Hapoel Tel Aviv	–	3–1	–
1996	Intertoto Cup	Group; 6	(France) Rennes	2–1	–	–
1996	Intertoto Cup	Group; 6	(Switzerland) Luzern	–	1–0	–
1996	Intertoto Cup	Semi-finals	(Sweden) Örebro	4–0	1–4	5–4
1996	Intertoto Cup	Finals	(Denmark) Silkeborg	1–2	1–0	2–2 (a)

== Notable coaches ==
- (Croatia) August Bivec
- (Croatia) Vladimir Vinek
- (Croatia) Ivan Medarić
- (Croatia) Domagoj Kapetanović
- (Croatia) Srećko Bogdan
- (Croatia) Zlatko Škorić
- (Croatia) Milivoj Bračun
- (Croatia) Branko Ivanković
- (Croatia) Mirko Kokotović
- (Croatia) Zlatko Kranjčar
- (Croatia) Mladen Munjaković
- (Croatia) Vjeran Simunić
- (Croatia) Mićun Jovanić
- (Croatia) Željko Kopić
- (Bosnia and Herzegovina) Ratko Ninković
- (Croatia) Ivan Pudar
- (Croatia) Darko Dražić
- (Croatia) Damir Milinović
