= Gradski stadion (Kutina) =

Football stadium in Kutina, Croatia

Coordinates: 45°29′16″N 16°46′57″E

- Moslavina
- Interactive map of Gradski stadion
- Full name: Gradski stadion u Kutini
- Address: Kutina; Croatia
- Location: Kutina, Croatia
- Operator: HNŠK Moslavina
- Capacity: 2,000
- Surface: Grass Artificial grass (auxiliary playground)

Construction
- Opened: 1964.

Tenant
- HNŠK Moslavina Atletical club

Gradski stadion u Kutini is a small football stadium in Kutina, Croatia. It serves as home stadium for football club HNŠK Moslavina. There is an athletic track around the field.

== Overview ==
The stadium's total capacity is 2,000, out of which 1,010 are seated. There are two grandstands: one is covered with seats, while the other is uncovered. Ultras of club, Gerila, are often found on the uncovered grandstand.

Right next to it, there is an auxiliary stadium with artificial grass, where the younger players usually play and train. In local slang, this stadium is often called "Moslavina", as is the club.

== Sources ==
- Gradski stadion (in Croatian)
