= NK Rudar Labin =

Croatian football club

NK Rudar
- Full name: NK Rudar Trans Euro
- Nickname: Kovari
- Founded: 1945.
- Ground: Gradski Stadion
- Capacity: 3,000
- Chairman: Remzo Zalihić
- League: Treća HNL
- 2016–17: 4. HNL, 2nd (promoted)
Home colours	Away colours

NK Rudar is a Croatian football club based in the town of Labin. They are currently competing in the Croatian Third Football League.
