= NK Samobor =

Croatian football club

- Full name: Nogometni klub Samobor
- Nickname: Žuto-Plavi
- Founded: 1925
- Ground: Gradski Stadion
- Capacity: 5,000
- Chairman: Roland Gajšak
- Manager: Stjepan Čordaš
- League: Četvrta HNL Center
- 2016–17: Treća HNL West, 15th (relegated)
- Website: https://www.nk-samobor.hr/
Home colours	Away colours

Nogometni klub Samobor, commonly known as NK Samobor is a Croatian football club based in the town of Samobor in Zagreb County. Samobor currently plays in Četvrta HNL Center, the fourth tier in Croatian football. The club currently plays at the Gradski Stadion which holds a seating capacity of 5,000.

Former Croatian international footballers Igor Bišćan and Tomo Šokota both played for Samobor during there the early part of their careers.
