= NK Slavonac CO =

Croatian football club

NK Slavonac
- Full name: NK Slavonac Stari Perkovci
- Founded: 1950
- Ground: Igralište Dobrevo
- Capacity: 1,000
- League: Second League of Brod-Posavina County
- 2012–13: 7th
Home colours	Away colours

NK Slavonac is a Croatian football club based in a village Stari Perkovci in Slavonia.

Slavonac clinched promotion to an expanded 1. HNL in 2009 after finishing 4th in the second division. However, since the club plays in a village of only 1,300 people, they were not able to secure a home ground for the top flight in nearby Slavonski Brod and were instead administratively relegated. The club were briefly accused of intentionally dropping points in order to avoid finishing in the promotion places during the season, but firmly denied this.

== Honours ==
(Croatia) Treća HNL – East:

- Winners (1): 2006–07
