= NK Imotski =

Croatian football club

- Full name: Nogometni klub Imotski
- Founded: 3 March 1991; 35 years ago
- Ground: Gospin dolac
- Capacity: 4,000
- Chairman: Luka Đuzel
- Manager: Ante Knezović
- League: 3. NL – Jug
- Website: www.nk-imotski.hr
Home colours	Away colours

NK Imotski is a Croatian professional football club based in the town of Imotski, in the region of Dalmatia. The club currently competes in 3. NL – Jug.

== History ==
NK Imotski were founded in 1991. They played several years in the 2. HNL, the Croatian second division, being relegated in 2013 and again in 2017.

== Stadium ==
Imotski play in the Gospin dolac, which has been named among the most beautiful stadiums in the world by numerous media outlets, including the BBC.
