= 2016–17 HNK Hajduk Split season =

Hajduk Split
2016–17 season
- Chairman: Ivan Kos
- Manager: Marijan Pušnik (until 1 December 2016); Joan Carrillo (from 5 December 2016)
- Prva HNL: 3rd
- Croatian Cup: Quarter-finals
- Europa League: Play-off round
- Top goalscorer: League: Márkó Futács (18); All: Márkó Futács (21)
- Highest home attendance: 29,109 vs Dinamo Zagreb (10 August 2016)
- Lowest home attendance: 45 vs Slaven Belupo (8 April 2017)
Home colours	Away colours

The 2016–17 season is the 106th season in Hajduk Split’s history and their twenty-sixth in the Prva HNL. Their 3rd place finish in the 2015–16 season means it is their 26th successive season playing in the Prva HNL.

== First-team squad ==
For details of former players, see List of HNK Hajduk Split players.

As of 17 February 2017

Note: Flags indicate national team as defined under FIFA eligibility rules; some limited exceptions apply. Players may hold more than one non-FIFA nationality.

No.	Pos.	Nation	Player
1	GK	CRO	Dante Stipica
3	DF	BIH	Josip Kvesić
4	DF	CRO	Petar Bosančić
5	MF	GAM	Hamza Barry (on loan from Apollon Limassol)
6	MF	BRA	Jefferson
8	MF	CRO	Nikola Vlašić
9	FW	HUN	Márkó Futács
11	FW	CMR	Franck Ohandza
13	GK	CRO	Ivo Grbić
17	DF	CRO	Josip Juranović
18	MF	BIH	Zvonimir Kožulj
20	MF	AUS	Anthony Kalik
22	FW	ITA	Said Ahmed Said

No.	Pos.	Nation	Player
23	DF	CRO	Zoran Nižić (captain)
25	GK	CRO	Karlo Letica
26	MF	CRO	Toma Bašić
27	DF	ALB	Hysen Memolla
28	FW	CRO	Marko Bencun
30	DF	CRO	Josip Bašić
32	MF	CRO	Fran Tudor
34	DF	KOS	Ardian Ismajli
44	DF	CRO	Marko Ćosić (on loan from Inter Zaprešić)
50	MF	CRO	Ante Erceg
55	DF	BUL	Georgi Terziev (on loan from Ludogorets)
88	MF	CRO	Frane Vojković
90	MF	GRE	Savvas Gentsoglou (on loan from Bari 1908)

== Competitions ==
=== Overall record ===
As of match played 26 May 2017

Performance by competition
Competition	Starting round	Final position/round	First match	Last match
Prva HNL	—N/a	3rd	17 July 2016	26 May 2017
Croatian Football Cup	First round	Quarter-finals	21 September 2016	30 November 2016
UEFA Europa League	Second qualifying round	Play-off round	14 July 2016	25 August 2016

Statistics by competition
Competition	Pld	W	D	L	GF	GA	GD	Win%
Prva HNL	36	20	9	7	70	31	+39	55.56
Croatian Football Cup	3	2	0	1	9	3	+6	66.67
UEFA Europa League	6	4	1	1	13	7	+6	66.67
Total	45	26	10	9	92	41	+51	57.78

=== Prva HNL ===
==== Classification ====
Pos	Team	Pld	W	D	L	GF	GA	GD	Pts	Qualification or relegation
1	Rijeka (C)	36	27	7	2	71	23	+48	88	Qualification to Champions League second qualifying round
2	Dinamo Zagreb	36	27	5	4	68	24	+44	86	Qualification to Europa League third qualifying round (Note: Since winners of 2016–17 Croatian Football Cup, Rijeka, qualified for Champions League, the spot awarded to the cup winner (Europa League third qualifying round) was passed to the runners-up and all other spots were adjusted accordingly.)
3	Hajduk Split	36	20	9	7	70	31	+39	69	Qualification to Europa League second qualifying round
4	Osijek	36	20	6	10	52	37	+15	66	Qualification to Europa League first qualifying round
5	Lokomotiva	36	12	8	16	41	38	+3	44	

Source: Prva HNL (in Croatian), Soccerway
Rules for classification: 1) Points; 2) Head-to-head points; 3) Head-to-head goal difference; 4) Head-to-head goals scored (away goals if tied); 5) Goal difference; 6) Goals scored; 7) Play-off
(Note: Criteria 2-4 and 7 is only used if deciding Champion, teams to international competition or teams for relegation and in that case criteria 6 will not be used).
(C) Champions

==== Results summary ====
Overall								Home						Away					
Pld	W	D	L	GF	GA	GD	Pts	W	D	L	GF	GA	GD	W	D	L	GF	GA	GD
36	20	9	7	70	31	+39	69	12	3	3	48	17	+31	8	6	4	22	14	+8

Last updated: 26 May 2017.
Source: Competitive matches

==== Results by round ====
Round	1	2	3	4	5	6	7	8	9	10	11	12	13	14	15	16	17	18	19	20	21	22	23	24	25	26	27	28	29	30	31	32	33	34	35	36
Ground	A	H	A	H	A	H	A	A	H	H	A	H	A	H	A	H	H	A	A	H	A	H	A	H	A	A	H	H	A	H	A	H	A	H	H	A
Result	W	L	W	W	D	L	W	D	W	W	D	W	D	W	L	W	W	L	W	L	D	W	L	D	D	W	D	W	W	W	W	W	L	D	W	W
Position	3	5	5	3	3	4	4	4	4	4	4	3	4	4	3	4	3	3	3	4	3	3	3	4	4	4	4	4	4	3	3	3	3	3	3	3

Source: Competitive matches
A = Away; H = Home; W = Win; D = Draw; L = Loss

==== Results by opponent ====
Team	Results				Points
Team	1	2	3	4	Points
Cibalia	2–0	6–1	2–1	3–0	12
Dinamo Zagreb	0–4	0–0	0–1	2–0	4
Inter Zaprešić	1–1	2–0	3–1	6–0	10
Istra 1961	4–0	0–0	4–0	2–0	10
Lokomotiva	2–0	1–0	0–0	1–1	8
Osijek	1–1	1–0	1–2	5–1	7
Rijeka	2–4	1–2	1–1	0–2	1
Slaven Belupo	4–0	1–2	1–1	2–1	7
RNK Split	1–0	2–1	1–1	5–2	10

Source: 2016–17 Croatian First Football League article

== Matches ==
=== Friendlies ===
==== Pre-season ====
Match	Date	Venue	Opponent	Score	Attendance	Hajduk Scorers	Report
1	15 Jun	A	Mosor	0 – 0	—		hajduk.hr
2	19 Jun	N (Austria)	Ujpest (Hungary)	1 – 1	500	Sušić	SD.hr
3	23 Jun	A (Austria)	Vorwärts Steyr (Austria)	6 – 0	700	Kožulj, Mastelić, Sušić, Vlašić, Budalić, T. Bašić	SD.hr
4	26 Jun	A (Slovenia)	Aluminij (Slovenia)	0 – 1	0		SD.hr
5	30 Jun	N (Slovenia)	Žalgiris (Lithuania)	2 – 1	20	Maganto, Kožulj	SD.hr
6	3 Jul	H	RNK Split	1 – 0	2,000	T. Bašić	SD.hr
7	7 Jul	H	Slavia Prague (Czech Republic)	1 – 0	4,950	Vlašić	SD.hr
8	11 Jul	A	Junak Sinj	1 – 0	2,000	Vrljičak	SD.hr

==== On-season ====
Match	Date	Venue	Opponent	Score	Attendance	Hajduk Scorers	Report
1	3 Sep	H	Široki Brijeg (Bosnia and Herzegovina)	3 – 1	—	Futács, Vojković, Jurić	SD.hr
2	5 Oct	A	BŠK Zmaj	2 – 0	1,100	Futács, Vojković	SD.hr
3	7 Oct	H	Zrinjski (Bosnia and Herzegovina)	2 – 0	2,000	Vojković, Futács (11m)	SD.hr
4	11 Nov	A	Jadran Stari Grad	11 – 0	—	Prtajin (4), Maganto (2), Mastelić, Barry (11m), Llanos (3)	SD.hr
5	15 Nov	A	Imotski	7 – 1	—	Vojković (2), Erceg (3), Tudor, Šimić	SD.hr

==== Mid-season ====
Match	Date	Venue	Opponent	Score	Hajduk Scorers	Report
1	25 Jan	N (Turkey)	Dnipro Dnipropetrovsk (Ukraine)	2 – 0	Vlašić, Ohandza	SD.hr
2	30 Jan	N (Turkey)	AS Trenčín (Slovakia)	4 – 2	Juranović, Said (2), Futács	SD.hr
3	3 Feb	N (Turkey)	Vardar (North Macedonia)	1 – 0	Ohandza	SD.hr
4	8 Feb	A	Dugopolje	2 – 0	Said, Erceg	SD.hr

=== Prva HNL ===
17 July 2016 1	Cibalia	0–2	Hajduk Split	Vinkovci
21:00 CEST (UTC+02:00)		Report	T. Bašić 17'; Ćosić (yellow card) 55'; Ismajli (yellow card) 76'; Šimić (yellow card) 80'; Kožulj 90+1'	Stadium: Stadion HNK Cibalia; Attendance: 3,947; Referee: Bruno Marić (Daruvar)

31 July 2016 3	RNK Split	0–1	Hajduk Split	Split
21:00 CEST (UTC+02:00)	Maglica (yellow card) 36'; Jakić (yellow card) 54'; Bagarić (yellow card) 86'	Report	Ohandza 90+1'	Stadium: Stadion Park Mladeži; Attendance: 3,000; Referee: Goran Gabrilo (Split)

7 August 2016 4	Hajduk Split	4–0	Istra 1961	Split
21:00 CEST (UTC+02:00)	Ohandza 42' (pen.); Erceg 60'; Tudor 69'; Žižić 78' (o.g.)	Report		Stadium: Stadion Poljud; Attendance: 6,860; Referee: Dario Bel (Osijek)

10 August 2016 2	Hajduk Split	0–4	Dinamo Zagreb	Split
19:00 CEST (UTC+02:00)	Sušić (yellow card) 74'; Jefferson (yellow card) 76'	Report	Rog 45+1', 60', (yellow card) 47'; Fernándes (yellow card) 52', (goal) 57', 68'; Sigali (yellow card) 72'; Knežević (yellow card) 87'	Stadium: Stadion Poljud; Attendance: 29,109; Referee: Mario Zebec (Cestica)

14 August 2016 5	Osijek	1–1	Hajduk Split	Osijek
21:00 CEST (UTC+02:00)	Ejupi 19'; Vojnović (yellow card) 86'; Lulić (yellow card) 87'; Lukić (yellow card) 89'	Report	Ismajli (yellow card) 7'; Erceg 12', (yellow card) 29'; Memolla (yellow card) 80'; Jefferson (yellow card) 84'	Stadium: Stadion Gradski vrt Attendance: 6,613; Referee: Dalibor Mlakar (Zagreb)

21 August 2016 6	Hajduk Split	2–4	Rijeka	Split
21:00 CEST (UTC+02:00)	Ohandza 13' (pen.); Šimić (yellow card) 27'; Bilyi (yellow card) 35'; Ismajli 66'; Juranović (yellow card) 68'; Erceg (yellow card) 83'	Report	Bradarić (yellow card) 13'; Gavranović 24'; Bezjak 35' (pen.), 61', (yellow card) 68'; Vešović (yellow card) 73'; Andrijašević 79'; J. Mišić (yellow card) 87'	Stadium: Stadion Poljud; Attendance: 10,374; Referee: Fran Jović (Zagreb)

28 August 2016 7	Lokomotiva	0–2	Hajduk Split	Zagreb
19:00 CEST (UTC+02:00)	Rožman (yellow card) 33' (yellow-red card) 45'; Šunjić (yellow card) 53'	Report	Erceg (yellow card) 29', (goal) 32'; T. Bašić (yellow card) 36'; Memolla (yellow card) 42'; Karačić 64' (o.g.)	Stadium: Stadion Kranjčevićeva; Attendance: 1,327; Referee: Igor Križarić (Čakovec)

9 September 2016 8	Inter Zaprešić	1–1	Hajduk Split	Zaprešić
18:00 CEST (UTC+02:00)	Puljić 5'; Mazalović (yellow card) 54'; Šarić (yellow card) 73'; Čović (yellow card) 83'	Report	Tudor 76'; Ćosić (yellow card) 90+2'	Stadium: Stadion ŠRC Zaprešić; Attendance: 2,635; Referee: Bruno Marić (Daruvar)

17 September 2016 9	Hajduk Split	4–0	Slaven Belupo	Split
19:00 CEST (UTC+02:00)	Kožulj (yellow card) 23'; Said 37', 71'; Erceg 74'; Futács 88'	Report	Héber (yellow card) 55'	Stadium: Stadion Poljud; Attendance: 5,890; Referee: Fran Jović (Zagreb)

24 September 2016 10	Hajduk Split	6–1	Cibalia	Split
19:00 CEST (UTC+02:00)	Said 7'; Barry (yellow card) 50'; Ohandza 54', 84'; Nižić (yellow card) 69'; Kožulj 71'; Jefferson 87'	Report	Dabro 34'; Tomašević (yellow card) 56'	Stadium: Stadion Poljud; Attendance: 6,061; Referee: Marin Vidulin (Kanfanar)

2 October 2016 11	Dinamo Zagreb	0–0	Hajduk Split	Zagreb
17:00 CEST (UTC+02:00)	Pivarić (yellow card) 24'; Benković (yellow card) 29'; Soudani (yellow card) 54'	Report	Kožulj (yellow card) 8'; Said (yellow card) 45'; Ćosić (yellow card) 58'; Jefferson (yellow card) 86'; Juranović (yellow card) 90+2'	Stadium: Stadion Maksimir; Attendance: 11,500; Referee: Ivan Bebek (Rijeka)

16 October 2016 12	Hajduk Split	2–1	RNK Split	Split
17:00 CEST (UTC+02:00)	Said (yellow card) 18'; Futács 56'; T. Bašić 81'	Report	Pavlovski (yellow card) 30'; Pešić 42', (yellow card) 74'; Ugrina (yellow card) 52'; Vitus (yellow card) 85'	Stadium: Stadion Poljud; Attendance: 7,276; Referee: Andrej Burilo (Osijek)

22 October 2016 13	Istra 1961	0–0	Hajduk Split	Pula
15:00 CEST (UTC+02:00)	Georgiev (yellow card) 86'	Report	Said (yellow card) 77'; Nižić (yellow card) 81'; T. Bašić (yellow card) 87'; Šimić (yellow card) 90+2'	Stadium: Stadion Aldo Drosina; Attendance: 2,594; Referee: Igor Pajač (Sveti Ivan Zelina)

30 October 2016 14	Hajduk Split	1–0	Osijek	Split
17:00 CET (UTC+01:00)	Futács 16', (yellow card) 90+1'; Juranović (yellow card) 38'; Nižić (yellow card) 53'; Barry (yellow card) 64'	Report	Barišić (yellow card) 33'; Lukić (yellow card) 39'	Stadium: Stadion Poljud; Attendance: 12,197; Referee: Marin Vidulin (Kanfanar)

5 November 2016 15	Rijeka	2–1	Hajduk Split	Rijeka
15:00 CET (UTC+01:00)	Ristovski (yellow card) 33'; Elez 66', 75'; J. Mišić (yellow card) 90+3'	Report	Jefferson (yellow card) 49'; Futács 60'; Memolla (yellow card) 87'	Stadium: Stadion Rujevica; Attendance: 5,508; Referee: Dalibor Mlakar (Zagreb)

19 November 2016 16	Hajduk Split	1–0	Lokomotiva	Split
17:00 CET (UTC+01:00)	Futács (yellow card) 36'; Barry 61'; Šimić (yellow card) 87'; Jefferson (yellow card) 90+1'	Report	Halilović (yellow card) 51'	Stadium: Stadion Poljud; Attendance: 5,225; Referee: Damir Batinić (Osijek)

27 November 2016 17	Hajduk Split	2–0	Inter Zaprešić	Split
17:00 CET (UTC+01:00)	Erceg 8'; Kožulj 32'; Šimić (yellow card) 64' (yellow-red card) 78'; Jefferson (yellow card) 84'	Report	Puljić (yellow card) 28'; Šoljić (yellow card) 34'	Stadium: Stadion Poljud; Attendance: 6,510; Referee: Ivan Vučković (Zagreb)

4 December 2016 18	Slaven Belupo	2–1	Hajduk Split	Koprivnica
15:00 CET (UTC+01:00)	Burić 34'; Jovičić (yellow card) 47'; Héber (yellow card) 52'; Ivanovski 60'	Report	Erceg (yellow card) 25'; Said 45'; Šimić (yellow card) 77'; Futács (penalty missed) 88'	Stadium: Gradski stadion Attendance: 2,405; Referee: Damir Batinić (Osijek)

10 December 2016 19	Cibalia	1–2	Hajduk Split	Vinkovci
15:00 CET (UTC+01:00)	Baša 22'; Pervan (yellow card) 44'; Šimunac (yellow card) 56' (yellow-red card) 76'; Filipović (yellow card) 87' (yellow-red card) 89'; Čuljak (red card) 90+5'	Report	Barry (yellow card) 38'; Futács (yellow card) 65', (goal) 90+1', 90+3'; Jefferson (red card) 90+5'	Stadium: Stadion HNK Cibalia; Attendance: 1,960; Referee: Željko Frković (Gospić)

17 December 2016 20	Hajduk Split	0–1	Dinamo Zagreb	Split
15:00 CET (UTC+01:00)	Kožulj (yellow card) 37'; Kvesić (yellow card) 81'; Erceg (yellow card) 81'; T. Bašić (yellow card) 88'; Šimić (red card) 90+5'; Juranović (yellow card) 90+6'	Report	Gojak (yellow card) 40'; Fernándes (yellow card) 45'; Soudani 90+2', (yellow card) 90+3'; Ćorić (yellow card) 90+6'	Stadium: Stadion Poljud; Attendance: 14,031; Referee: Mario Zebec (Cestica)

19 February 2017 21	RNK Split	1–1	Hajduk Split	Split
17:00 CET (UTC+01:00)	Dupovac (yellow card) 27'; Pešić 76'; Vuković (yellow card) 83'	Report	Ćosić (yellow card) 37'; Erceg 82'	Stadium: Stadion Park Mladeži; Attendance: 3,068; Referee: Igor Pajač (Sveti Ivan Zelina)

24 February 2017 22	Hajduk Split	4–0	Istra 1961	Split
18:00 CET (UTC+01:00)	Erceg 5', (yellow card) 30'; Vlašić 15'; Said 88'; Futács (yellow card) 40', (goal) 90+1'	Report	Solomon (yellow card) 37'; Žižić (yellow card) 40'; Roce (yellow card) 84'	Stadium: Stadion Poljud; Attendance: 4,948; Referee: Dalibor Mlakar (Zagreb)

5 March 2017 23	Osijek	2–1	Hajduk Split	Osijek
15:00 CET (UTC+01:00)	Ejupi 63' (pen.), 80'; Knežević (yellow card) 64'; Škorić (yellow card) 87'	Report	Barry (yellow card) 30'; Said (yellow card) 54'; Futács 90+4'	Stadium: Stadion Gradski vrt Attendance: 4,959; Referee: Ivan Bebek (Rijeka)

11 March 2017 24	Hajduk Split	1–1	Rijeka	Split
17:00 CET (UTC+01:00)	Barry (yellow card) 19' (goal) 31'; Bašić (yellow card) 43'; Erceg (yellow card) 90+6'	Report	Kulušić (yellow card) 4'; Črnic (yellow card) 71'; Bezjak 81' (pen.); Bradarić (yellow card) 87'; Prskalo (yellow card) 89'; Čanađija (yellow card) 90+4'	Stadium: Stadion Poljud; Attendance: 15,462; Referee: Mario Zebec (Cestica)

17 March 2017 25	Lokomotiva	0–0	Hajduk Split	Zagreb
18:00 CET (UTC+01:00)	Rožman (yellow card) 53'; Šunjić (yellow card) 73'; Grezda (yellow card) 87'; Bočkaj (yellow card) 90+2'	Report	Futács (yellow card) 25' (yellow-red card) 46'	Stadium: Stadion Kranjčevićeva; Attendance: 1,269; Referee: Ante Vučemilović-Šimunović (Osijek)

31 March 2017 26	Inter Zaprešić	1–3	Hajduk Split	Zaprešić
18:00 CEST (UTC+02:00)	Kolar 3'; Mazalović (yellow card) 65' (yellow-red card) 66'	Report	Bašić 34'; Vlašić (yellow card) 48'; Said (yellow card) 54'; Jefferson (yellow card) 71'; Nižić 77'; Ohandza 88', (yellow card) 88'	Stadium: Stadion ŠRC Zaprešić; Attendance: 2,412; Referee: Fran Jović (Zagreb)

8 April 2017 27	Hajduk Split	1–1	Slaven Belupo	Split
15:00 CEST (UTC+02:00)	Ohandza 66'; Ćosić (yellow card) 79'; Barry (yellow card) 90+1'	Report	Musa (yellow card) 28'; Melnjak (yellow card) 54'; Katić (yellow card) 62'; Ivanovski 72' (pen.)	Stadium: Stadion Poljud; Attendance: 45; Referee: Dalibor Mlakar (Zagreb)

14 April 2017 28	Hajduk Split	3–0	Cibalia	Split
18:00 CEST (UTC+02:00)	Zgrablić 62' (o.g.); Ohandza (yellow card) 66'; Kožulj 85'; Vlašić 87'	Report	Rubić (yellow card) 18'; Zgrablić (yellow card) 22'; M. Mišić (yellow card) 54'; Žderić (yellow card) 70'	Stadium: Stadion Poljud; Attendance: 45; Referee: Igor Križarić (Čakovec)

22 April 2017 29	Dinamo Zagreb	0–2	Hajduk Split	Zagreb
15:00 CEST (UTC+02:00)		Report	Erceg (yellow card) 7', (goal) 29'; Tudor (yellow card) 42'; Bašić (yellow card) 82'; Futács 90'	Stadium: Stadion Maksimir; Attendance: 13,392; Referee: Ante Vučemilović-Šimunović (Osijek)

26 April 2017 30	Hajduk Split	5–2	RNK Split	Split
20:00 CEST (UTC+02:00)	Vlašić 12' (pen.), (yellow card) 70'; Nižić 45'; Erceg 47'; Said 67'; Ohandza 85'	Report	Perković (yellow card) 2'; Tomičić 39'; Dupovac (yellow card) 54'; Ugrina 64'	Stadium: Stadion Poljud; Attendance: 5,450; Referee: Ivan Vučković (Zagreb)

30 April 2017 31	Istra 1961	0–2	Hajduk Split	Pula
15:00 CEST (UTC+02:00)	Solomon (yellow card) 80' (Iveša (yellow card) 90+4')	Report	Erceg 20'; Futács 32'; Terziev (red card) 90+3'	Stadium: Stadion Aldo Drosina; Attendance: 2,981; Referee: Igor Pajač (Sveti Ivan Zelina)

6 May 2017 32	Hajduk Split	5–1	Osijek	Split
17:00 CEST (UTC+02:00)	Barry (yellow card) 13'; Tudor (yellow card) 15'; Bašić 56', 65'; Futács 61'; Erceg 70'; Said 88'	Report	Lyopa (yellow card) 53'; Boban 90+1'	Stadium: Stadion Poljud; Attendance: 9,947; Referee: Ivan Bebek (Rijeka)

13 May 2017 33	Rijeka	2–0	Hajduk Split	Rijeka
17:00 CEST (UTC+02:00)	Ristovski (yellow card) 9'; Maleš 14'; Gavranović 29'; Vešović (yellow card) 42'; Župarić (yellow card) 45+3'; Bezjak (yellow card) 62'	Report	Erceg (yellow card) 9'; Tudor (yellow card) 63'; Nižić (yellow card) 76'; Ohandza (yellow card) 86'	Stadium: Stadion Rujevica; Attendance: 5,792; Referee: Mario Zebec (Cestica)

16 May 2017 34	Hajduk Split	1–1	Lokomotiva	Split
19:00 CEST (UTC+02:00)	Jefferson (yellow card) 42'; Bašić (yellow card) 65'; Nižić (yellow card) 72'; Barry 87'	Report	Doležal 37'; Bočkaj (yellow card) 41' (yellow-red card) 46'; Kluk (yellow card) 83'; Karačić (yellow card) 90+1'	Stadium: Stadion Poljud; Attendance: 5,187; Referee: Ivan Bebek (Rijeka)

20 May 2017 35	Hajduk Split	6–0	Inter Zaprešić	Split
19:00 CEST (UTC+02:00)	Futács 16', 52', 55', 69'; Nižić (yellow card) 30'; Tudor 58'; Vlašić 62'	Report	Begić (yellow card) 77'	Stadium: Stadion Poljud; Attendance: 5,511; Referee: Fran Jović (Zagreb)

26 May 2017 36	Slaven Belupo	1–2	Hajduk Split	Koprivnica
18:00 CEST (UTC+02:00)	Međimorec 76'	Report	Futács 8', 25'; Barry (yellow card) 44'; Erceg (yellow card) 90+1'; Ohandza (yellow card) 90+2'	Stadium: Gradski stadion Attendance: 1,487; Referee: Igor Pajač (Sveti Ivan Zelina)

Source: Croatian Football Federation

=== Croatian Cup ===
21 September 2016 R1	Jalžabet	0–6	Hajduk Split	Jalžabet
15:30 CEST (UTC+02:00)	Levatić (yellow card) 56'; Friščić (yellow card) 69'	Report	T. Bašić 18'; Barry 19'; Tudor 50', 87'; Futács 68', 90+2'	Stadium: Stadion Jalžabet; Attendance: 2,500; Referee: Dario Bel (Osijek)

26 October 2016 R2	Solin	1–2	Hajduk Split	Solin
14:00 CEST (UTC+02:00)	Jelavić 16'; Farić (yellow card) 31'; Mrković (yellow card) 35'; Gruica (yellow card) 54'; Šarlija (yellow card) 62'	Report	Memolla (yellow card) 45'; Erceg 64'; Futács 71' (pen.); Gentsoglou (yellow card) 85'; Said (yellow card) 89'; Kožulj (yellow card) 90+2'	Stadium: Stadion pokraj Jadra; Attendance: 2,000; Referee: Dario Kulušić (Šibenik)

30 November 2016 QF	RNK Split	2–1 (a.e.t.)	Hajduk Split	Split
19:00 CET (UTC+01:00)	Baturina (yellow card) 72'; Ugrina 90+2', (yellow card) 111'; Pešić 106'; Jakić (yellow card) 117'	Report	Barry 25', (yellow card) 84'; Tudor (yellow card) 90+2' (yellow-red card) 99'	Stadium: Stadion Park Mladeži; Attendance: 2,435; Referee: Tihomir Pejin (Donji Miholjac)

=== Europa League ===
==== Second qualifying round ====
14 July 2016 First leg	CSMS Iași (Romania)	2–2	(Croatia) Hajduk Split	Iași, Romania
21:00 EEST (UTC+03:00)	Cristea 19'; Piccioni 23'; Ciucă (yellow card) 80'; Martin (yellow card) 82'	Report	Ohandza 48'; Said 90+4', (yellow card) 90+5'	Stadium: Stadionul Emil Alexandrescu; Attendance: 8,600; Referee: Yuriy Mozharovskyy (Ukraine)

21 July 2016 Second leg	Hajduk Split (Croatia)	2–1 (4–3 agg.)	(Romania) CSMS Iași	Split, Croatia
20:30 CEST (UTC+02:00)	Tudor 22'; Nižić (yellow card) 75'; Ohandza 90'	Report	Ciucur 26'; Cristea (yellow card) 55'; Mitić (yellow card) 59'	Stadium: Stadion Poljud; Attendance: 16,978; Referee: Frank Schneider (France)

==== Third qualifying round ====
28 July 2016 First leg	Oleksandriya (Ukraine)	0–3	(Croatia) Hajduk Split	Oleksandriia, Ukraine
19:30 EEST (UTC+03:00)	Basov (yellow card) 37'; Banada (yellow card) 69'; Leonov (yellow card) 86'	Report	Kožulj (yellow card) 25'; Nižić (yellow card) 37'; Ćosić 52'; Jefferson (yellow card) 75'; Erceg 82'; Ohandza 90'	Stadium: CSC Nika Stadium; Attendance: 5,000; Referee: Gediminas Mažeika (Lithuania)

4 August 2016 Second leg	Hajduk Split (Croatia)	3–1 (6–1 agg.)	(Ukraine) Oleksandriya	Split, Croatia
20:30 CEST (UTC+02:00)	Nižić 21'; Sušić 52' (pen.), 56'; Vlašić (yellow card) 84'; Bašić (yellow card) 90'; Milić (yellow card) 90+4'	Report	Starenkyi 13'; Mikitsey (yellow card) 24'; Gitchenko (yellow card) 52'; Shendrik (yellow card) 55'	Stadium: Stadion Poljud; Attendance: 25,000; Referee: John Beaton (Scotland)

==== Play-off round ====
18 August 2016 First leg	Maccabi Tel Aviv (Israel)	2–1	(Croatia) Hajduk Split	Netanya, Israel
20:00 EEST (UTC+03:00)	Alberman 9'; Tibi (yellow card) 31'; Scarione 77'; Igiebor (yellow card) 85'; Ben Haim I (yellow card) 90+1'	Report	Nižić (yellow card) 53'; Said 56'; Ćosić (yellow card) 67'; Gentsoglou (yellow card) 86'	Stadium: Netanya Stadium; Attendance: 9,932; Referee: Jesús Gil Manzano (Spain)

25 August 2016 Second leg	Hajduk Split (Croatia)	2–1 (a.e.t.) (3–3 agg.) (3–4 p)	(Israel) Maccabi Tel Aviv	Split, Croatia
20:30 CEST (UTC+02:00)	Ćosić 40', 59'; Ismajli (yellow card) 54'	Report	Micha (yellow card) 31'; Ben Haim I (yellow card) 39'; Scarione 52'; Igiebor (yellow card) 53'; Dasa (yellow card) 99'	Stadium: Stadion Poljud; Attendance: 21,102; Referee: Felix Zwayer (Germany)
	Penalties
	Vlašić (penalty scored); Tudor (penalty missed); Ohandza (penalty missed); Gentsoglou (penalty scored); Sušić (penalty scored); Ćosić (penalty missed)		(penalty scored) Yitzhaki; (penalty missed) Ben Haim I (penalty missed) Scarione; (penalty scored) Sá; (penalty scored) Medunjanin; (penalty scored) Rikan

Source: uefa.com

== Player seasonal records ==
Competitive matches only. Updated to games played 26 May 2017.

=== Top scorers ===
Rank	Name	League	Europe	Cup	Total
1	(Hungary) Márkó Futács	18	–	3	21
2	(Croatia) Ante Erceg	11	1	1	13
3	(Cameroon) Franck Ohandza	8	3	–	11
4	(Italy) Said Ahmed Said	7	2	–	9
5	(Croatia) Toma Bašić	5	–	1	6
5	(Croatia) Fran Tudor	3	1	2	6
7	(The Gambia) Hamza Barry	3	–	2	5
8	(Bosnia and Herzegovina) Zvonimir Kožulj	4	–	–	4
8	(Croatia) Nikola Vlašić	4	–	–	4
10	(Croatia) Zoran Nižić	2	1	–	3
10	(Croatia) Marko Ćosić	–	3	–	3
12	(Bosnia and Herzegovina) Tino-Sven Sušić	–	2	–	2
13	(Kosovo) Ardian Ismajli	1	–	–	1
13	(Brazil) Jefferson	1	–	–	1
	Own goals	3	–	–	3
	TOTALS	70	13	9	92

Source: Competitive matches

=== Clean sheets ===
Number	Player	1. HNL	Europe	Cup	Total
1	(Croatia) Dante Stipica	10	0	0	10
91	(Croatia) Lovre Kalinić	6	1	0	7
13	(Croatia) Ivo Grbić	0	0	1	1
TOTALS		16	1	1	18

Source: Competitive matches

=== Disciplinary record ===
Includes all competitive matches. Players with 1 card or more included only.

Number	Position	Name	1. HNL			Europa League			Croatian Cup			Total		
Number	Position	Name	Booked	(yellow card) (yellow-red card)	Sent off (straight red)	Booked	(yellow card) (yellow-red card)	Sent off (straight red)	Booked	(yellow card) (yellow-red card)	Sent off (straight red)	Booked	(yellow card) (yellow-red card)	Sent off (straight red)
3	DF	(Bosnia and Herzegovina) Josip Kvesić	1	0	0	0	0	0	0	0	0	1	0	0
4	DF	(Ukraine) Maksym Bilyi	1	0	0	0	0	0	0	0	0	1	0	0
5	DF	(Croatia) Lorenco Šimić	5	1	1	0	0	0	0	0	0	5	1	1
5	MF	(The Gambia) Hamza Barry	8	0	0	0	0	0	1	0	0	9	0	0
6	MF	(Brazil) Jefferson	8	0	1	1	0	0	0	0	0	9	0	1
8	MF	(Croatia) Nikola Vlašić	2	0	0	1	0	0	0	0	0	3	0	0
9	FW	(Hungary) Márkó Futács	4	1	0	0	0	0	0	0	0	4	1	0
11	FW	(Cameroon) Franck Ohandza	4	0	0	0	0	0	0	0	0	4	0	0
17	DF	(Croatia) Josip Juranović	4	0	0	0	0	0	0	0	0	4	0	0
18	MF	(Bosnia and Herzegovina) Zvonimir Kožulj	3	0	0	1	0	0	1	0	0	5	0	0
19	DF	(Croatia) Hrvoje Milić	0	0	0	1	0	0	0	0	0	1	0	0
22	FW	(Italy) Said Ahmed Said	5	0	0	1	0	0	1	0	0	7	0	0
23	DF	(Croatia) Zoran Nižić	6	0	0	3	0	0	0	0	0	9	0	0
26	MF	(Croatia) Toma Bašić	6	0	0	1	0	0	0	0	0	7	0	0
27	DF	(Albania) Hysen Memolla	3	0	0	0	0	0	1	0	0	4	0	0
31	MF	(Bosnia and Herzegovina) Tino-Sven Sušić	1	0	0	0	0	0	0	0	0	1	0	0
32	MF	(Croatia) Fran Tudor	3	0	0	0	0	0	0	1	0	3	1	0
34	DF	(Kosovo) Ardian Ismajli	2	0	0	1	0	0	0	0	0	3	0	0
44	DF	(Croatia) Marko Ćosić	5	0	0	1	0	0	0	0	0	6	0	0
50	MF	(Croatia) Ante Erceg	10	0	0	0	0	0	0	0	0	10	0	0
55	DF	(Bulgaria) Georgi Terziev	1	0	1	0	0	0	0	0	0	1	0	1
90	DF	(Greece) Savvas Gentsoglou	0	0	0	1	0	0	1	0	0	2	0	0
		TOTALS	82	2	3	12	0	0	5	1	0	99	3	3

Sources: Prva-HNL.hr, UEFA.com

=== Appearances and goals ===
Number	Position	Player	Apps	Goals	Apps	Goals	Apps	Goals	Apps	Goals
Number	Position	Player	Total		1. HNL (Note: First number represents appearances in starting eleven, while the second number indicates a substitute appearance.)		Europa League		Croatian Cup	
1	GK	(Croatia) Dante Stipica	26	0	23+0	0	2+0	0	1+0	0
3	DF	(Bosnia and Herzegovina) Josip Kvesić	10	0	9+0	0	0+0	0	1+0	0
4	DF	(Croatia) Petar Bosančić	2	0	1+1	0	0+0	0	0+0	0
4	DF	(Ukraine) Maksym Bilyi	8	0	3+1	0	2+2	0	0+0	0
5	DF	(Croatia) Lorenco Šimić	16	0	13+0	0	1+0	0	2+0	0
5	MF	(The Gambia) Hamza Barry	30	5	21+6	3	0+0	0	3+0	2
6	MF	(Brazil) Jefferson	35	1	22+5	1	6+0	0	2+0	0
7	MF	(Croatia) Ivan Prtajin	1	0	0+1	0	0+0	0	0+0	0
8	MF	(Croatia) Nikola Vlašić	37	4	27+3	4	6+0	0	1+0	0
9	FW	(Hungary) Márkó Futács	28	21	20+6	18	0+0	0	2+0	3
11	FW	(Cameroon) Franck Ohandza	31	11	8+16	8	0+6	3	1+0	0
13	GK	(Croatia) Ivo Grbić	1	0	0+0	0	0+0	0	1+0	0
14	MF	(Croatia) Tonći Mujan	4	0	0+3	0	0+1	0	0+0	0
15	MF	(Spain) Ignacio Maganto	9	0	2+7	0	0+0	0	0+0	0
16	FW	(Croatia) Ivan Mastelić	2	0	0+0	0	1+0	0	1+0	0
17	MF	(Croatia) Josip Juranović	25	0	17+1	0	4+0	0	3+0	0
18	MF	(Bosnia and Herzegovina) Zvonimir Kožulj	35	4	18+8	4	6+0	0	1+2	0
19	DF	(Croatia) Hrvoje Milić	4	0	0+0	0	4+0	0	0+0	0
21	MF	(Croatia) Robert Jandrek	5	0	0+5	0	0+0	0	0+0	0
22	FW	(Italy) Said Ahmed Said	36	9	16+12	7	5+1	2	1+1	0
23	DF	(Croatia) Zoran Nižić	33	3	28+0	2	5+0	1	0+0	0
24	DF	(Croatia) Marko Pejić	5	0	4+0	0	0+0	0	0+1	0
26	MF	(Croatia) Toma Bašić	36	6	17+11	5	1+4	0	2+1	1
27	DF	(Albania) Hysen Memolla	28	0	24+0	0	2+0	0	2+0	0
31	MF	(Bosnia and Herzegovina) Tino-Sven Sušić	7	2	2+0	0	5+0	2	0+0	0
32	MF	(Croatia) Fran Tudor	34	6	20+7	3	2+2	1	1+2	2
34	DF	(Kosovo) Ardian Ismajli	20	1	11+7	1	2+0	0	0+0	0
44	DF	(Croatia) Marko Ćosić	25	3	16+0	0	6+0	3	3+0	0
50	MF	(Croatia) Ante Erceg	33	13	27+2	11	0+1	1	2+1	1
55	DF	(Bulgaria) Georgi Terziev	8	0	8+0	0	0+0	0	0+0	0
88	MF	(Croatia) Frane Vojković	7	0	3+3	0	0+0	0	1+0	0
90	MF	(Greece) Savvas Gentsoglou	28	0	23+1	0	2+0	0	1+1	0
91	GK	(Croatia) Lovre Kalinić	18	0	13+0	0	4+0	0	1+0	0

Sources: Prva-HNL.hr, UEFA.com

=== Overview of statistics ===
Statistic	Overall	1. HNL	Croatian Cup	Europa League
Most appearances	Vlašić (37)	Vlašić (30)	7 players (3)	6 players (6)
Most starts	Vlašić (34)	Nižić (28)	Ćosić, Hamza & Juranović (3)	4 players (6)
Most substitute appearances	Ohandza (22)	Ohandza (16)	Kožulj & Tudor (2)	Ohandza (6)
Most minutes played	Vlašić (3,027)	Vlašić (2,356)	Juranović (300)	Ćosić (570)
Top goalscorer	Futács (21)	Futács (18)	Futács (3)	Ćosić & Ohandza (3)
Most assists	Erceg (9)	Erceg (9)	–	Sušić (3)
Most yellow cards	Erceg (10)	Erceg (10)	5 players (1)	Nižić (3)
Most red cards	Šimić (2)	Šimić (2)	Tudor (1)	–
Last updated: 6 March 2021.

== Transfers ==
=== In ===
Date	Position	Player	From	Fee
28 May 2016	MF	(Australia) Anthony Kalik	Central Coast Mariners	45.000 €
14 June 2016	MF	(Bosnia and Herzegovina) Zvonimir Kožulj	Široki Brijeg	200.000 €
16 June 2016	MF	(Croatia) Ante Erceg	Balikesirspor	Free
19 June 2016	DF	(Albania) Hysen Memolla	Hellas Verona	Free
5 July 2016	FW	(Italy) Said Ahmed Said	Olhanense	Free
6 July 2016	FW	(Hungary) Márkó Futács	Mersin İdmanyurdu	Free
26 July 2016	MF	(Spain) Ignacio Maganto	Los Angeles Galaxy	Free
31 August 2016	DF	(Bosnia and Herzegovina) Josip Kvesić	Antalyaspor	Free
18 January 2017	FW	(Croatia) Ivan Prtajin	Udinese	Free

Total spending: ▼245.000 €

=== Out ===
Date	Position	Player	To	Fee
22 May 2016	MF	(Croatia) Ante Roguljić	Red Bull Salzburg	Loan ended
7 June 2016	FW	(Croatia) Ivan Prskalo	Cibalia	Free (released)
7 June 2016	DF	(Argentina) Julián Velázquez	Palermo	Loan ended
7 June 2016	FW	(Venezuela) Manuel Arteaga	Palermo	Loan ended
16 June 2016	FW	(Croatia) Ivan Mamut	Inter Zaprešić	Free (released)
23 June 2016	DF	(Austria) David Domej	Leicester City F.C.	Free (released)
30 June 2016	FW	(Argentina) Nicolás Vélez	NorthEast United FC	Free (released)
7 July 2016	GK	(Croatia) Fabjan Tomić	NK Vrapče	Free (released)
20 July 2016	FW	(Albania) Elvir Maloku	Gimnàstic	Free (released)
12 August 2016	MF	(Ukraine) Artem Radchenko		Free (released)
14 August 2016	FW	(Croatia) Josip Maganjić	Fiorentina	1 million €
14 August 2016	DF	(Croatia) Hrvoje Milić	Fiorentina	700.000 €
30 August 2016	MF	(Bosnia and Herzegovina) Tino-Sven Sušić	Genk	2 million €
4 September 2016	DF	(Ukraine) Maksym Bilyi	Anzhi Makhachkala	Free (released)
27 December 2016	GK	(Croatia) Lovre Kalinić	Gent	3,1 million €
6 January 2017	MF	(Bosnia and Herzegovina) Ismar Hairlahović	Sloboda Tuzla	Free (released)
8 January 2017	DF	(Croatia) Marko Pejić	Austria Wien	Free (released)
16 January 2017	MF	(Spain) Ignacio Maganto	SS Reyes	Free (released)
31 January 2017	DF	(Croatia) Lorenco Šimić	Sampdoria	1,4 million €
31 January 2017	MF	(Croatia) Tonći Mujan	Krško	Free (released)
10 February 2017	MF	(Albania) Arlind Basha		Free (released)

Total income: ▲8,2 million €

Total expenditure: ▲7,955 million €

=== Promoted from youth squad ===
Position	Player	Age
MF	(Croatia) Robert Jandrek	21
FW	(Croatia) Ivan Prtajin	21

=== Loans in ===
Date	Position	Player	From	Until
16 June 2016	DF	(Croatia) Marko Ćosić	Inter Zaprešić	14 June 2017
8 August 2016	MF	(Greece) Savvas Gentsoglou	Bari 1908	30 June 2017
31 August 2016	MF	(The Gambia) Hamza Barry	Apollon Limassol	30 June 2017
15 February 2017	DF	(Bulgaria) Georgi Terziev	Ludogorets Razgrad	30 June 2017

=== Loans out ===
Date	Position	Player	To	Until
26 June 2016	MF	(Croatia) Petar Bosančić	Sesvete	31 December 2016
12 August 2016	GK	(Croatia) Karlo Čović	Šibenik	30 June 2017
18 August 2016	GK	(Croatia) Davor Matijaš	Primorac 1929	31 December 2016
19 August 2016	GK	(Croatia) Karlo Letica	Rudeš	29 June 2017^{1}
26 August 2016	MF	(Bosnia and Herzegovina) Kristian Puljić	Imotski	29 June 2017
13 February 2017	GK	(Croatia) Marin Ljubić	Val Kaštel Stari	29 June 2017
13 February 2017	FW	(Croatia) Ivan Mastelić	Cibalia	30 June 2017
15 February 2017	DF	(Croatia) Ante Vrljičak	Dugopolje	15 June 2017
15 February 2017	DF	(Croatia) Hrvoje Relota	Dugopolje	15 June 2017

^{1} Loan was terminated on 13 February 2017

Sources: Glasilo Hrvatskog nogometnog saveza
