= 2015–16 HNK Hajduk Split season =

Hajduk Split
2015–16 season
- Chairman/ Chairwoman: Marin Brbić (until 1 April 2016); Marijana Bošnjak (interim) (from 12 April to 17 May 2016)
- Manager: Damir Burić
- Prva HNL: 3rd
- Croatian Cup: Semi-final
- Europa League: Play-off round
- Top goalscorer: League: Tino-Sven Sušić (12); All: Tino-Sven Sušić (15)
- Highest home attendance: 32,021 vs Slovan Liberec (27 August 2015)
- Lowest home attendance: 3,888 vs Inter Zaprešić (21 November 2015)
- Average home league attendance: 9,222
| Home colours | Away colours |

The 2015–16 season was the 105th season in Hajduk Split’s history and their twenty-fifth in the Prva HNL. Their 3rd place finish in the 2014–15 season means it was their 25th successive season playing in the Prva HNL.

== First-team squad ==
As of 9 May 2016

Note: Flags indicate national team as defined under FIFA eligibility rules; some limited exceptions apply. Players may hold more than one non-FIFA nationality.

| No. | Pos. | Nation | Player |
|---|---|---|---|
| 1 | GK | CRO | Dante Stipica |
| 2 | DF | ARG | Julián Velázquez (on loan from Palermo) |
| 3 | DF | CRO | Hrvoje Milić |
| 4 | DF | UKR | Maksym Bilyi |
| 5 | DF | CRO | Lorenco Šimić |
| 6 | MF | BRA | Jefferson |
| 7 | MF | UKR | Artem Radchenko |
| 8 | MF | CRO | Nikola Vlašić |
| 9 | FW | ARG | Nicolás Vélez |
| 11 | FW | CMR | Franck Ohandza |
| 13 | GK | CRO | Ivo Grbić |
| 14 | MF | CRO | Tonći Mujan |
| 16 | FW | CRO | Ivan Mastelić |
| 17 | MF | CRO | Josip Juranović |

| No. | Pos. | Nation | Player |
|---|---|---|---|
| 19 | MF | ALB | Elvir Maloku |
| 20 | MF | AUS | Anthony Kalik (on loan from Central Coast Mariners) |
| 21 | FW | CRO | Ivan Prskalo |
| 22 | FW | VEN | Manuel Arteaga (on loan from Palermo) |
| 23 | DF | CRO | Zoran Nižić |
| 24 | DF | CRO | Marko Pejić |
| 26 | MF | CRO | Toma Bašić |
| 28 | MF | CRO | Marko Bencun |
| 30 | MF | CRO | Josip Bašić |
| 31 | MF | BIH | Tino-Sven Sušić |
| 32 | MF | CRO | Fran Tudor |
| 44 | MF | CRO | Ante Roguljić (on loan from Red Bull Salzburg) |
| 88 | MF | CRO | Frane Vojković |
| 91 | GK | CRO | Lovre Kalinić (captain) |

== Competitions ==
=== Overall record ===
Performance by competition
| Competition | Starting round | Final position/round | First match | Last match |
|---|---|---|---|---|
| Prva HNL | —N/a | 3rd | 12 July 2015 | 14 May 2016 |
| Croatian Football Cup | First round | Semi-final | 23 September 2015 | 6 April 2016 |
| UEFA Europa League | First qualifying round | Play-off round | 2 July 2015 | 27 August 2015 |

Statistics by competition
| Competition | Pld | W | D | L | GF | GA | GD | Win% |
|---|---|---|---|---|---|---|---|---|
| Prva HNL | 36 | 17 | 10 | 9 | 46 | 28 | +18 | 47.22 |
| Croatian Football Cup | 5 | 3 | 0 | 2 | 14 | 8 | +6 | 60.00 |
| UEFA Europa League | 8 | 4 | 1 | 3 | 17 | 9 | +8 | 50.00 |
| Total | 48 | 23 | 11 | 14 | 74 | 43 | +31 | 47.92 |

=== Prva HNL ===
==== Table ====
| Pos | Team | Pld | W | D | L | GF | GA | GD | Pts | Qualification or relegation |
|---|---|---|---|---|---|---|---|---|---|---|
| 1 | Dinamo Zagreb (C) | 36 | 26 | 7 | 3 | 67 | 19 | +48 | 85 | Qualification for the Champions League second qualifying round (Note: Dinamo Zagreb qualified for the Europa League third qualifying round by winning the 2015–16 Croatian Football Cup. However, since they already qualified for European competition based on their league position, the spot awarded to the cup winners was passed down the league.) |
| 2 | Rijeka | 36 | 21 | 14 | 1 | 56 | 20 | +36 | 77 | Qualification for the Europa League third qualifying round |
| 3 | Hajduk Split | 36 | 17 | 10 | 9 | 46 | 28 | +18 | 61 | Qualification for the Europa League second qualifying round |
| 4 | Lokomotiva | 36 | 16 | 4 | 16 | 56 | 53 | +3 | 52 | Qualification for the Europa League first qualifying round |
| 5 | Inter Zaprešić | 36 | 11 | 14 | 11 | 39 | 48 | −9 | 47 | |

Source: PrvaHNL.hr, Soccerway
Rules for classification: 1) Points; 2) Head-to-head points; 3) Head-to-head goal difference; 4) Head-to-head goals scored (at home if two teams tied); 5) Goal difference; 6) Goals scored; 7) Play-off
(Note: Criteria 2–4 and 7 is only used if deciding Champion, teams to international competition or teams for relegation and in that case criteria 6 will not be used).
(C) Champions

==== Results summary ====
| Overall | | | | | | | | Home | | | | | | Away | | | | | |
| Pld | W | D | L | GF | GA | GD | Pts | W | D | L | GF | GA | GD | W | D | L | GF | GA | GD |
|---|---|---|---|---|---|---|---|---|---|---|---|---|---|---|---|---|---|---|---|
| 36 | 17 | 10 | 9 | 46 | 28 | +18 | 61 | 10 | 5 | 3 | 27 | 12 | +15 | 7 | 5 | 6 | 19 | 16 | +3 |

Last updated: 14 May 2016.
Source: PrvaHNL.hr

==== Results by round ====
| Round | 1 | 2 | 3 | 4 | 5 | 6 | 7 | 8 | 9 | 10 | 11 | 12 | 13 | 14 | 15 | 16 | 17 | 18 | 19 | 20 | 21 | 22 | 23 | 24 | 25 | 26 | 27 | 28 | 29 | 30 | 31 | 32 | 33 | 34 | 35 | 36 |
|---|---|---|---|---|---|---|---|---|---|---|---|---|---|---|---|---|---|---|---|---|---|---|---|---|---|---|---|---|---|---|---|---|---|---|---|---|
| Ground | A | H | A | H | A | A | H | A | H | H | A | H | A | H | H | A | H | A | A | H | A | H | A | A | H | A | H | H | A | H | A | H | H | A | H | A |
| Result | D | D | L | D | W | D | W | W | W | D | W | W | W | W | L | L | W | W | L | D | W | W | L | L | D | D | W | W | D | W | D | W | L | L | L | W |
| Position | 5 | 7 | 9 | 8 | 6 | 6 | 4 | 4 | 3 | 3 | 2 | 2 | 2 | 1 | 2 | 3 | 3 | 3 | 3 | 3 | 3 | 3 | 3 | 3 | 3 | 3 | 3 | 3 | 3 | 3 | 3 | 3 | 3 | 3 | 3 | 3 |

Source: Competitive matches
A = Away; H = Home; W = Win; D = Draw; L = Loss

==== Results by opponent ====
| Team | Results | | | | Points |
| Team | 1 | 2 | 3 | 4 | Points |
|---|---|---|---|---|---|
| Dinamo Zagreb | 1–1 | 0–0 | 1–2 | 1–0 | 5 |
| Inter Zaprešić | 2–0 | 4–0 | 0–0 | 0–2 | 7 |
| Istra 1961 | 1–4 | 3–0 | 2–0 | 3–0 | 9 |
| Lokomotiva | 2–1 | 2–1 | 1–2 | 2–0 | 9 |
| Osijek | 3–0 | 0–1 | 2–2 | 1–2 | 4 |
| Rijeka | 0–0 | 0–3 | 0–1 | 1–2 | 1 |
| Slaven Belupo | 2–2 | 1–0 | 2–0 | 0–0 | 8 |
| RNK Split | 0–0 | 2–0 | 0–0 | 0–0 | 6 |
| NK Zagreb | 1–0 | 2–0 | 1–0 | 3–2 | 12 |

Source: 2015–16 Croatian First Football League article

== Matches ==
=== Friendlies ===
==== Pre-season ====
| Match | Date | Venue | Opponent | Score | Attendance | Hajduk Scorers | Report |
|---|---|---|---|---|---|---|---|
| 1 | 17 Jun | A (Slovenia) | Domžale (Slovenia) | 3 – 1 | – | Maloku, Maglica, Mujan | Sportnet.hr |
| 2 | 24 Jun | N (Austria) | Ried (Austria) | 1 – 0 | 2,000 | Ohandza | Sportnet.hr |
| 3 | 27 Jun | A (Austria) | Vorwärts Steyr (Austria) | 2 – 1 | 2,500 | Bencun, Roguljić | Sportnet.hr |

==== On-season ====
| Match | Date | Venue | Opponent | Score | Attendance | Hajduk Scorers | Report |
|---|---|---|---|---|---|---|---|
| 1 | 9 Oct | N | Široki Brijeg (Bosnia and Herzegovina) | 0 – 2 | – | | SD.hr |
| 2 | 11 Oct | A | Vukovar 1991. | 3 – 1 | – | Bencun, J. Bašić, Simonović | SD.hr |
| 3 | 10 Nov | A | NK Škabrnja | 6 – 0 | 1,200 | Mujan, Maglica (2), Juranović, Mastelić, Bencun | SD.hr |
| 4 | 23 Mar | A | NK Krk | 2 – 3 | 700 | Kovačević (og), Radchenko (11m) | SD.hr |

==== Mid-season ====
| Match | Date | Venue | Opponent | Score | Hajduk Scorers | Report |
|---|---|---|---|---|---|---|
| 1 | 29 Jan | N (Turkey) | Ferencváros (Hungary) | 2 – 4 | Jefferson, Arteaga | hajduk.hr |
| 2 | 31 Jan | N (Turkey) | Wisła Kraków (Poland) | 0 – 1 | | hajduk.hr |

=== Prva HNL ===
| 12 July 2015 1 | Dinamo Zagreb | 1–1 | Hajduk Split | Zagreb |
| 19:00 CEST (UTC+02:00) | Taravel (yellow card) 14'; Soudani 37'; Rog (yellow card) 88'; Pinto (yellow card) 89' | Report | Caktaš 8' (yellow card) 56'; Ohandza (yellow card) 31' | Stadium: Stadion Maksimir; Attendance: 23,631; Referee: Bruno Marić (Daruvar) |

| 19 July 2015 2 | Hajduk Split | 0–0 | RNK Split | Split |
| 21:00 CEST (UTC+02:00) | Jefferson (yellow card) 30'; Bencun (yellow card) 71'; Maglica (yellow card) 74'; Milović (yellow card) 80'; Radchenko (yellow card) 90+2' | Report | Bagarić (yellow card) 11'; Vidović (yellow card) 25'; Blagojević (yellow card) 34'; Majstorović (yellow card) 53'; Obšivač (yellow card) 82' | Stadium: Stadion Poljud; Attendance: 10,594; Referee: Mario Zebec (Cestica) |

| 26 July 2015 3 | Istra 1961 | 4–1 | Hajduk Split | Pula |
| 21:00 CEST (UTC+02:00) | Heister 10', 64'; Grković (yellow card) 35'; Žižić (yellow card) 38'; Repić 40' (pen.); Tomić 51' | Report | Tudor (yellow card) 50'; Kiš 63'; Jefferson (yellow card) 67'; Milović (yellow card) 79' | Stadium: Stadion Aldo Drosina; Attendance: 3,898; Referee: Fran Jović (Zagreb) |

| 2 August 2015 4 | Hajduk Split | 2–2 | Slaven Belupo | Split |
| 19:00 CEST (UTC+02:00) | Pejić (yellow card) 21'; Maloku 58'; Roguljić (yellow card) 64'; Milović 70' (yellow card) 77' | Report | Crepulja 19' (yellow card) 61'; Ozobić 25'; Potokar (yellow card) 33' | Stadium: Stadion Poljud; Attendance: 8,753; Referee: Ivan Bebek (Rijeka) |

| 10 August 2015 5 | Lokomotiva | 1–2 | Hajduk Split | Zagreb |
| 20:00 CEST (UTC+02:00) | Bručić (yellow card) 20'; Andrijašević (yellow card) 81'; Kolar 89'; Mrčela (yellow card) 90+1' | Report | Kiš 11'; Balić 77' | Stadium: Stadion Kranjčevićeva; Attendance: 3,800; Referee: Ante Vučemilović-Šimunović (Osijek) |

| 15 August 2015 6 | Rijeka | 0–0 | Hajduk Split | Rijeka |
| 19:00 CEST (UTC+02:00) | Moisés (red card) 16'; Sharbini (yellow card) 62' | Report | Vlašić (yellow card) 15'; Caktaš (yellow card) 22'; Nižić (yellow card) 36'; Jefferson (yellow card) 57'; Velázquez (red card) 64'; Sušić (yellow card) 65' | Stadium: Stadion Rujevica; Attendance: 5,287; Referee: Marijo Strahonja (Zaprešić) |

| 23 August 2015 7 | Hajduk Split | 3–0 | Osijek | Split |
| 21:00 CEST (UTC+02:00) | Maloku 19'; Bencun (yellow card) 84' (goal) 90+1'; Caktaš 87' | Report | Šorša (yellow card) 3'; Čuljak (yellow card) 60' | Stadium: Stadion Poljud; Attendance: 8,305; Referee: Domagoj Vučkov (Rijeka) |

| 30 August 2015 8 | Inter Zaprešić | 0–2 | Hajduk Split | Zaprešić |
| 19:00 CEST (UTC+02:00) | Mazalović (yellow card) 15'; Komorski (yellow card) 43' (yellow-red card) 51'; Nestorovski (yellow card) 51'; Čeliković (yellow card) 69' | Report | Balić 5'; Jefferson (yellow card) 7'; Milović (yellow card) 58'; Ohandza 69'; Kalinić (yellow card) 71'; Milić (yellow card) 75' | Stadium: Stadion ŠRC Zaprešić; Attendance: 1,839; Referee: Ivan Bebek (Rijeka) |

| 12 September 2015 9 | Hajduk Split | 1–0 | NK Zagreb | Split |
| 19:00 CEST (UTC+02:00) | Caktaš (yellow card) 11' (goal) 21'; Milić (yellow card) 72'; Velázquez (yellow card) 87' | Report | Ljubičić (yellow card) 35'; Šulc (yellow card) 64' (yellow-red card) 87' | Stadium: Stadion Poljud; Attendance: 6,237; Referee: Marko Matoc (Zaprešić) |

| 19 September 2015 10 | Hajduk Split | 0–0 | Dinamo Zagreb | Split |
| 17:00 CEST (UTC+02:00) | Sušić (yellow card) 32'; Velázquez (red card) 90+3' | Report | Rog (yellow card) 18'; Soudani (yellow card) 87'; Henríquez (penalty missed) 90+3' | Stadium: Stadion Poljud; Attendance: 17,939; Referee: Bruno Marić (Daruvar) |

| 27 September 2015 11 | RNK Split | 0–2 | Hajduk Split | Split |
| 19:00 CEST (UTC+02:00) | Mršić (yellow card) 40'; Bagarić (yellow card) 75'; Obšivač (yellow card) 78' | Report | Sušić (yellow card) 11'; Vlašić 45+1'; Caktaš 48' | Stadium: Stadion Park Mladeži; Attendance: 3,000; Referee: Ivan Bebek (Rijeka) |

| 4 October 2015 12 | Hajduk Split | 3–0 | Istra 1961 | Split |
| 15:00 CEST (UTC+02:00) | Gojković 8' (o.g.); Jefferson 10'; Caktaš 30' (pen.) | Report | Heister (yellow card) 29'; Iveša (yellow card) 30' | Stadium: Stadion Poljud; Attendance: 7,819; Referee: Fran Jović (Zagreb) |

| 18 October 2015 13 | Slaven Belupo | 0–1 | Hajduk Split | Koprivnica |
| 15:00 CEST (UTC+02:00) | Savić (yellow card) 69'; Paracki (yellow card) 90+2' | Report | Sušić 42' (yellow card) 63'; Caktaš (red card) 90+4' | Stadium: Gradski stadion Attendance: 2,487; Referee: Ivan Bebek (Rijeka) |

| 24 October 2015 14 | Hajduk Split | 2–1 | Lokomotiva | Split |
| 19:00 CEST (UTC+02:00) | Sušić 29'; Kalinić (yellow card) 50'; Milović (yellow card) 54'; Tudor 65'; Bencun (yellow card) 72' | Report | Andrijašević 55'; Capan (yellow card) 69'; Grezda (yellow card) 76' | Stadium: Stadion Poljud; Attendance: 8,374; Referee: Mario Zebec (Cestica) |

| 1 November 2015 15 | Hajduk Split | 0–3 | Rijeka | Split |
| 17:00 CET (UTC+01:00) | | Report | Bezjak 28'; Tomasov 42' (yellow card) 44'; Balaj 50' (yellow card) 87'; Bradarić (yellow card) 71' | Stadium: Stadion Poljud; Attendance: 24,621; Referee: Marijo Strahonja (Zaprešić) |

| 7 November 2015 16 | Osijek | 1–0 | Hajduk Split | Osijek |
| 15:00 CET (UTC+01:00) | Lesjak (penalty missed) 9'; Šarić 41' (yellow card) 90+3'; Lukić (yellow card) 56'; Špoljarić (yellow card) 90+4' | Report | Sušić (yellow card) 90+2' | Stadium: Stadion Gradski vrt Attendance: 2,487; Referee: Dalibor Mlakar (Zagreb) |

| 21 November 2015 17 | Hajduk Split | 4–0 | Inter Zaprešić | Split |
| 17:00 CET (UTC+01:00) | Sušić 22' (yellow card) 43'; Tudor 40'; Bencun 45'; Maloku (yellow card) 83'; Bilyi (yellow card) 86'; Roguljić 90' | Report | Jefthon (yellow card) 85' | Stadium: Stadion Poljud; Attendance: 3,888; Referee: Damir Batinić (Osijek) |

| 28 November 2015 18 | NK Zagreb | 0–2 | Hajduk Split | Zagreb |
| 15:00 CET (UTC+01:00) | Boban (penalty missed) 25'; Kolinger (yellow card) 27'; Šulc (yellow card) 44' (yellow-red card) 45+1'; Matić (yellow card) 71' | Report | Tudor 17' (yellow card) 76'; Vlašić (yellow card) 29'; Caktaš (penalty missed) 28'; Bencun 89'; Milović (yellow card) 24' (yellow-red card) 90' | Stadium: Stadion Kranjčevićeva; Attendance: 1,500; Referee: Marijo Strahonja (Zaprešić) |

| 5 December 2015 19 | Dinamo Zagreb | 2–1 | Hajduk Split | Zagreb |
| 15:00 CET (UTC+01:00) | Fernandes 6'; Soudani 90+5' (yellow card) 90+5' | Report | Caktaš 17'; Tudor (yellow card) 25'; Sušić (yellow card) 52'; Milić (yellow card) 53'; Jefferson (yellow card) 63' (yellow-red card) 90'; Bencun (yellow card) 90' | Stadium: Stadion Maksimir; Attendance: 10,328; Referee: Ante Vučemilović-Šimunović (Osijek) |

| 12 December 2015 20 | Hajduk Split | 0–0 | RNK Split | Split |
| 17:00 CET (UTC+01:00) | Roguljić (yellow card) 21'; Sušić (yellow card) 69' | Report | Erceg (yellow card) 47'; Oremuš (yellow card) 62'; Majstorović (yellow card) 75'; Blagojević (yellow card) 87' | Stadium: Stadion Poljud; Attendance: 6,988; Referee: Domagoj Vučkov (Rijeka) |

| 19 December 2015 21 | Istra 1961 | 0–2 | Hajduk Split | Pula |
| 17:00 CET (UTC+01:00) | Ojdanić (yellow card) 34'; Đurić (yellow card) 66' | Report | Milić 12'; Sušić 52'; Caktaš (yellow card) 86' | Stadium: Stadion Aldo Drosina; Attendance: 1,654; Referee: Domagoj Vučkov (Rijeka) |

| 13 February 2016 22 | Hajduk Split | 2–0 | Slaven Belupo | Split |
| 17:00 CET (UTC+01:00) | Sušić 45'; Nižić 76'; Bilyi (yellow card) 84' | Report | Križman (yellow card) 84' | Stadium: Stadion Poljud; Attendance: 15,855; Referee: Fran Jović (Zagreb) |

| 20 February 2016 23 | Lokomotiva | 2–1 | Hajduk Split | Zagreb |
| 15:00 CET (UTC+01:00) | Grezda 26'; Pamić (yellow card) 45'; Andrijašević 52'; Leko (yellow card) 55'; Karačić (yellow card) 71'; Prenga (yellow card) 76'; Fiolić (yellow card) 88'; Ćorić (yellow card) 89' | Report | Tudor 65'; Juranović (yellow card) 75'; Sušić (red card) 76'; Mastelić (yellow card) 78' | Stadium: Stadion Kranjčevićeva; Attendance: 3,150; Referee: Tihomir Pejin (Donji Miholjac) |

| 27 February 2016 24 | Rijeka | 1–0 | Hajduk Split | Rijeka |
| 17:00 CET (UTC+01:00) | Matei (yellow card) 11'; Matei (yellow card) 11'; Maleš (yellow card) 45+1' (yellow-red card) 66'; Samardžić 49'; Močinić (yellow card) 77'; Brezovec (yellow card) 77' | Report | Mastelić (yellow card) 27'; Jefferson (yellow card) 41' | Stadium: Stadion Rujevica; Attendance: 5,450; Referee: Damir Batinić (Osijek) |

| 1 March 2016 25 | Hajduk Split | 2–2 | Osijek | Split |
| 19:00 CET (UTC+01:00) | Sušić 11'; Nižić 36'; Juranović (yellow card) 40'; Jefferson (yellow card) 86'; Sušić (yellow card) 89' | Report | Šorša 7'; Knežević (yellow card) 33'; Lesjak (yellow card) 46'; Škorić (yellow card) 50'; Matas (yellow card) 72'; Mioč 90+5' | Stadium: Stadion Poljud; Attendance: 6,169; Referee: Ivan Bebek (Rijeka) |

| 8 March 2016 26 | Inter Zaprešić | 0–0 | Hajduk Split | Zaprešić |
| 17:00 CET (UTC+01:00) | Mazalović (yellow card) 31' (yellow-red card) 72'; Blažević (yellow card) 49'; Mlinar (yellow card) 90'; Nestorovski (yellow card) 90+3' | Report | Nižić (yellow card) 46'; Mastelić (yellow card) 50'; Maloku (yellow card) 60'; Bencun (yellow card) 90+1' | Stadium: Stadion ŠRC Zaprešić; Attendance: 1,264; Referee: Igor Križarić (Čakovec) |

| 13 March 2016 27 | Hajduk Split | 1–0 | NK Zagreb | Split |
| 17:00 CET (UTC+01:00) | Sušić 48' (pen.); Maloku (yellow card) 81' | Report | Strasser (yellow card) 23'; Mudražija (yellow card) 70'; Šulc (yellow card) 72' | Stadium: Stadion Poljud; Attendance: 5,451; Referee: Marijo Strahonja (Zaprešić) |

| 20 March 2016 28 | Hajduk Split | 1–0 | Dinamo Zagreb | Split |
| 15:00 CET (UTC+01:00) | Tudor 4'; Bašić (yellow card) 76'; Sušić (yellow card) 90+3' | Report | Hodžić (yellow card) 87' | Stadium: Stadion Poljud; Attendance: 12,726; Referee: Ante Vučemilović-Šimunović (Osijek) |

| 3 April 2016 29 | RNK Split | 0–0 | Hajduk Split | Split |
| 19:00 CEST (UTC+02:00) | Majstorović (yellow card) 42'; Grubišić (yellow card) 63'; Vrgoč (yellow card) 71' | Report | Šimić (yellow card) 2'; Kalinić (yellow card) 51'; Tudor (yellow card) 90+2' | Stadium: Stadion Park Mladeži; Attendance: 3,500; Referee: Marin Vidulin (Kanfanar) |

| 10 April 2016 30 | Hajduk Split | 3–0 | Istra 1961 | Split |
| 19:00 CEST (UTC+02:00) | Šimić 36'; Kalik (yellow card) 39'; Sušić 41' (pen.), 74' (pen.); Mastelić (yellow card) 60' | Report | Heister (yellow card) 35'; Brkić (yellow card) 41'; Hadžić (yellow card) 79' | Stadium: Stadion Poljud; Attendance: 4,765; Referee: Damir Batinić (Osijek) |

| 17 April 2016 31 | Slaven Belupo | 0–0 | Hajduk Split | Koprivnica |
| 15:00 CEST (UTC+02:00) | Purić (yellow card) 36'; Ozobić (yellow card) 80' | Report | Kalik (yellow card) 5'; Velázquez (yellow card) 68' | Stadium: Gradski stadion Attendance: 2,040; Referee: Dalibor Mlakar (Zagreb) |

| 20 April 2016 32 | Hajduk Split | 2–0 | Lokomotiva | Split |
| 19:00 CEST (UTC+02:00) | Tudor (yellow card) 43'; Sušić 75' (pen.); Juranović (yellow card) 82' (goal) 90+4'; Milić (yellow card) 83'; Šimić (yellow card) 85' | Report | Doležal (yellow card) 35'; Çekiçi (yellow card) 59'; J. Ćorić (yellow card) 75' | Stadium: Stadion Poljud; Attendance: 4,825; Referee: Igor Križarić (Čakovec) |

| 24 April 2016 33 | Hajduk Split | 1–2 | Rijeka | Split |
| 15:00 CEST (UTC+02:00) | Sušić 25' | Report | Maleš (yellow card) 36'; Balaj (yellow card) 37'; Vešović 57'; Gavranović 79' | Stadium: Stadion Poljud; Attendance: 6,369; Referee: Fran Jović (Zagreb) |

| 1 May 2016 34 | Osijek | 2–1 | Hajduk Split | Osijek |
| 15:00 CEST (UTC+02:00) | Arsenić (yellow card) 39'; Knežević 50', 74'; Radotić (yellow card) 52'; Čuljak (yellow card) 60'; Vojnović (yellow card) 61'; Grgić (yellow card) 65'; Mandić (yellow card) 90+1' | Report | Sušić (yellow card) 60' (goal) 84' (pen.); Mastelić (yellow card) 82'; Jefferson (yellow card) 85' | Stadium: Stadion Gradski vrt Attendance: 1,899; Referee: Igor Pajač (Sveti Ivan Zelina) |

| 8 May 2016 35 | Hajduk Split | 0–2 | Inter Zaprešić | Split |
| 19:00 CEST (UTC+02:00) | Šimić (yellow card) 3' (yellow-red card) 33'; Vojković (yellow card) 30'; Sušić (yellow card) 64'; Jefferson (yellow card) 84' | Report | Nestorovski 31' (pen.), 88'; Bočkaj (yellow card) 62'; Glavina (yellow card) 86' | Stadium: Stadion Poljud; Attendance: 5,033; Referee: Igor Križarić (Čakovec) |

| 14 May 2016 36 | NK Zagreb | 2–3 | Hajduk Split | Zagreb |
| 17:00 CEST (UTC+02:00) | Stubičan (yellow card) 27' (red card) 35'; Mudražija (yellow card) 45+5'; Ćavar (yellow card) 54'; Medić 58', 75' (pen.); Musa (yellow card) 78' | Report | Mujan (yellow card) 28'; T. Bašić 29'; Tudor 45', 72' (pen.); Pejić (yellow card) 45+1'; Ismajli (yellow card) 48'; Vojković (yellow card) 61' | Stadium: Stadion Kranjčevićeva; Attendance: 941; Referee: Željko Frković (Gospić) |

Source: HRnogomet.com

=== Croatian Cup ===
| 23 September 2015 R1 | Sloga Nova Gradiška | 0–7 | Hajduk Split | Nova Gradiška |
| 15:30 CEST (UTC+02:00) | | Report | Sušić 8', 30', 73'; Caktaš 18'; Maloku 22'; Bašić 84'; Mujan 87'; Tudor (yellow card) 87' | Stadium: Gradski Stadion; Attendance: 3,000; Referee: Damir Batinić (Osijek) |

| 28 October 2015 R2 | Lekenik | 1–5 | Hajduk Split | Lekenik |
| 14:00 CET (UTC+01:00) | Živčić 20'; Poljak (yellow card) 23'; Kovačević (yellow card) 26'; Balen (yellow card) 30' (yellow-red card) 81' | Report | Caktaš 30' (pen.), 84'; Bencun (yellow card) 31'; Maglica 34', 54'; Sušić (yellow card) 52'; Jefferson (yellow card) 75'; Roguljić 85' | Stadium: ŠRC Lekenik; Attendance: 1,500; Referee: Tihomir Pejin (Donji Miholjac) |

| 2 December 2015 QF | NK Zagreb | 1–2 | Hajduk Split | Zagreb |
| 17:00 CET (UTC+01:00) | Juranović 18' (o.g.); Matić (yellow card) 54' (yellow-red card) 77'; Mudražija (yellow card) 64'; Šehić (yellow card) 85' | Report | Jefferson 24'; Bencun 32'; Maloku (yellow card) 88' | Stadium: Stadion Kranjčevićeva; Attendance: 1,015; Referee: Damir Batinić (Osijek) |

| 16 March 2016 SF | Hajduk Split | 0–2 | Dinamo Zagreb | Split |
| 17:30 CET (UTC+01:00) | Sušić (yellow card) 45'; Vélez (yellow card) 50'; Šimić (yellow card) 54'; Vlašić (yellow card) 77'; Milić (yellow card) 90' | Report | Soudani 23'; A. Ćorić 29'; Rog (yellow card) 61'; Fernandes (yellow card) 82' | Stadium: Stadion Poljud; Attendance: 12,973; Referee: Damir Batinić (Osijek) |

| 6 April 2016 SF | Dinamo Zagreb | 4–0 (6–0 agg.) | Hajduk Split | Zagreb |
| 17:30 CEST (UTC+02:00) | Brekalo 2'; Musa (yellow card) 17'; Fernandes 24', 50'; Soudani 67' | Report | Nižić (yellow card) 17'; Jefferson (yellow card) 34'; Pejić (yellow card) 79'; Sušić (yellow card) 86' | Stadium: Stadion Maksimir; Attendance: 7,932; Referee: Ivan Bebek (Rijeka) |

Source: HRnogomet.com

=== Europa League ===
==== First qualifying round ====
| 2 July 2015 First leg | Sillamäe Kalev (Estonia) | 1–1 | (Croatia) Hajduk Split | Rakvere, Estonia |
| 19:30 EEST (UTC+03:00) | Vnukov (yellow card) 39'; Silich 40'; Cheminava (yellow card) 47'; Russo (yellow card) 64'; Šišov (yellow card) 85' | Report | Caktaš 6' (pen.) | Stadium: Rakvere linnastaadion Attendance: 750; Referee: Juan Martínez Munuera (Spain) |

| 9 July 2015 Second leg | Hajduk Split (Croatia) | 6–2 (7–3 agg.) | (Estonia) Sillamäe Kalev | Dugopolje, Croatia |
| 20:45 CEST (UTC+02:00) | Balić 15'; Caktaš 45+1'; Ohandza 56', 63'; Vlašić 72'; Maglica 88' | Report | Russo 36', 41' | Stadium: Stadion Hrvatski vitezovi Attendance: 4,500; Referee: Stavros Tritsonis (Greece) |

==== Second qualifying round ====
| 16 July 2015 First leg | Koper (Slovenia) | 3–2 | (Croatia) Hajduk Split | Koper, Slovenia |
| 19:00 CEST (UTC+02:00) | Halilović 7'; Rahmanović 17', 41' (yellow card) 55'; Šme (yellow card) 90+1' | Report | Roguljić (yellow card) 27'; Milović 29'; Balić (yellow card) 45'; Nižić 90' | Stadium: Bonifika Stadium; Attendance: 2,590; Referee: Bartosz Frankowski (Poland) |

| 23 July 2015 Second leg | Hajduk Split (Croatia) | 4–1 (6–4 agg.) | (Slovenia) Koper | Split, Croatia |
| 19:00 CEST (UTC+02:00) | Kiš 2' (yellow card) 55'; Nižić (yellow card) 12'; Jefferson 40' (yellow card) 67'; Caktaš 62'; Maglica 69' | Report | Tomić (yellow card) 42'; Palčič 45+2'; Šme (yellow card) 59'; Halilović (yellow card) 80'; Ivančić (yellow card) 89' | Stadium: Stadion Poljud; Attendance: 22,650; Referee: Marco Fritz (Germany) |

==== Third qualifying round ====
| 30 July 2015 First leg | Hajduk Split (Croatia) | 2–0 | (Norway) Strømsgodset | Split, Croatia |
| 21:00 CEST (UTC+02:00) | Balić 67'; Kiš 90+3' | Report | Hamoud (yellow card) 5'; Madsen (yellow card) 52'; Kastrati (yellow card) 62' | Stadium: Stadion Poljud; Attendance: 27,704; Referee: Kristo Tohver (Estonia) |

| 6 August 2015 Second leg | Strømsgodset (Norway) | 0–2 (0–4 agg.) | (Croatia) Hajduk Split | Drammen, Norway |
| 19:00 CEST (UTC+02:00) | Høibråten (yellow card) 85' | Report | Nižić (yellow card) 11' (yellow-red card) 53'; Caktaš 55'; Ohandza 77' | Stadium: Marienlyst Stadion; Attendance: 5,330; Referee: Oliver Drachta (Austria) |

==== Play-off round ====
| 20 August 2015 First leg | Slovan Liberec (Czech Republic) | 1–0 | (Croatia) Hajduk Split | Liberec, Czech Republic |
| 19:00 CEST (UTC+02:00) | Folprecht (yellow card) 39'; Coufal (yellow card) 55'; Šural (yellow card) 60'; Pokorný 79' | Report | Jefferson (yellow card) 38'; Milić (yellow card) 39'; Bilyi (yellow card) 79' | Stadium: Stadion u Nisy; Attendance: 8,530; Referee: David Fernández Borbalán (Spain) |

| 27 August 2015 Second leg | Hajduk Split (Croatia) | 0–1 (0–2 agg.) | (Czech Republic) Slovan Liberec | Split, Croatia |
| 20:00 CEST (UTC+02:00) | Milić (yellow card) 48' | Report | Šural 23' (yellow card) 34'; Delarge (yellow card) 27'; Koubek (yellow card) 55'; Pavelka (yellow card) 60'; Pokorný (yellow card) 90+1' | Stadium: Stadion Poljud; Attendance: 32,021; Referee: Artur Soares Dias (Portugal) |

Source: uefa.com

== Player seasonal records ==
Competitive matches only. Updated to games played 14 May 2016.

=== Top scorers ===
| Rank | Name | League | Europe | Cup | Total |
|---|---|---|---|---|---|
| 1 | (Bosnia and Herzegovina) Tino-Sven Sušić | 12 | – | 3 | 15 |
| 2 | (Croatia) Mijo Caktaš | 6 | 4 | 3 | 13 |
| 3 | (Croatia) Fran Tudor | 7 | – | – | 7 |
| 4 | (Croatia) Andrija Balić | 2 | 2 | – | 4 |
| 4 | (Croatia) Marko Bencun | 3 | – | 1 | 4 |
| 4 | (Croatia) Tomislav Kiš | 2 | 2 | – | 4 |
| 4 | (Croatia) Anton Maglica | – | 2 | 2 | 4 |
| 4 | (Cameroon) Franck Ohandza | 1 | 3 | – | 4 |
| 9 | (Brazil) Jefferson | 1 | 1 | 1 | 3 |
| 9 | (Croatia) Elvir Maloku | 2 | – | 1 | 3 |
| 9 | (Croatia) Zoran Nižić | 2 | 1 | – | 3 |
| 12 | (Croatia) Goran Milović | 1 | 1 | – | 2 |
| 12 | (Croatia) Ante Roguljić | 1 | – | 1 | 2 |
| 12 | (Croatia) Nikola Vlašić | 1 | 1 | – | 2 |
| 15 | (Croatia) Josip Bašić | – | – | 1 | 1 |
| 15 | (Croatia) Toma Bašić | 1 | – | – | 1 |
| 15 | (Croatia) Josip Juranović | 1 | – | – | 1 |
| 15 | (Croatia) Hrvoje Milić | 1 | – | – | 1 |
| 15 | (Croatia) Tonći Mujan | – | – | 1 | 1 |
| 15 | (Croatia) Lorenco Šimić | 1 | – | – | 1 |
| | Own goals | 1 | – | – | 1 |
| | TOTALS | 46 | 17 | 14 | 77 |

Source: Competitive matches

=== Clean sheets ===
| Number | Player | 1. HNL | Europe | Cup | Total |
|---|---|---|---|---|---|
| 91 | (Croatia) Lovre Kalinić | 19 | 2 | 0 | 21 |
| 13 | (Croatia) Ivo Grbić | 1 | 0 | 1 | 2 |
| 1 | (Croatia) Dante Stipica | 1 | 0 | 0 | 1 |
| TOTALS | | 21 | 2 | 1 | 24 |

Source: Competitive matches

=== Disciplinary record ===
Includes all competitive matches. Players with 1 card or more included only.

| Number | Position | Name | 1. HNL | | | Europa League | | | Croatian Cup | | | Total | | |
|---|---|---|---|---|---|---|---|---|---|---|---|---|---|---|
| Number | Position | Name | Booked | (yellow card) (yellow-red card) | Sent off (straight red) | Booked | (yellow card) (yellow-red card) | Sent off (straight red) | Booked | (yellow card) (yellow-red card) | Sent off (straight red) | Booked | (yellow card) (yellow-red card) | Sent off (straight red) |
| 2 | DF | (Argentina) Julián Velázquez | 2 | 1 | 1 | 0 | 0 | 0 | 0 | 0 | 0 | 2 | 1 | 1 |
| 3 | DF | (Croatia) Hrvoje Milić | 4 | 0 | 0 | 2 | 0 | 0 | 1 | 0 | 0 | 7 | 0 | 0 |
| 3 | DF | (Ukraine) Maksym Bilyi | 1 | 0 | 0 | 1 | 0 | 0 | 0 | 0 | 0 | 2 | 0 | 0 |
| 5 | DF | (Croatia) Goran Milović | 5 | 1 | 0 | 0 | 0 | 0 | 0 | 0 | 0 | 5 | 1 | 0 |
| 5 | DF | (Croatia) Lorenco Šimić | 2 | 1 | 0 | 0 | 0 | 0 | 1 | 0 | 0 | 3 | 1 | 0 |
| 5 | DF | (Albania) Ardian Ismajli | 1 | 0 | 0 | 0 | 0 | 0 | 0 | 0 | 0 | 1 | 0 | 0 |
| 6 | MF | (Brazil) Jefferson | 8 | 1 | 0 | 2 | 0 | 0 | 2 | 0 | 0 | 12 | 1 | 0 |
| 7 | MF | (Ukraine) Artem Radchenko | 1 | 0 | 0 | 0 | 0 | 0 | 0 | 0 | 0 | 1 | 0 | 0 |
| 8 | MF | (Croatia) Nikola Vlašić | 2 | 0 | 0 | 0 | 0 | 0 | 1 | 0 | 0 | 3 | 0 | 0 |
| 9 | FW | (Argentina) Nicolás Vélez | 0 | 0 | 0 | 0 | 0 | 0 | 1 | 0 | 0 | 1 | 0 | 0 |
| 9 | FW | (Croatia) Anton Maglica | 1 | 0 | 0 | 0 | 0 | 0 | 0 | 0 | 0 | 1 | 0 | 0 |
| 11 | FW | (Cameroon) Franck Ohandza | 1 | 0 | 0 | 0 | 0 | 0 | 0 | 0 | 0 | 1 | 0 | 0 |
| 14 | FW | (Croatia) Tonći Mujan | 1 | 0 | 0 | 0 | 0 | 0 | 0 | 0 | 0 | 1 | 0 | 0 |
| 16 | MF | (Croatia) Ivan Mastelić | 5 | 0 | 0 | 0 | 0 | 0 | 0 | 0 | 0 | 5 | 0 | 0 |
| 17 | MF | (Croatia) Josip Juranović | 3 | 0 | 0 | 0 | 0 | 0 | 0 | 0 | 0 | 3 | 0 | 0 |
| 18 | MF | (Croatia) Mijo Caktaš | 4 | 0 | 1 | 0 | 0 | 0 | 0 | 0 | 0 | 4 | 0 | 1 |
| 19 | MF | (Croatia) Elvir Maloku | 3 | 0 | 0 | 0 | 0 | 0 | 1 | 0 | 0 | 4 | 0 | 0 |
| 20 | MF | (Australia) Anthony Kalik | 2 | 0 | 0 | 0 | 0 | 0 | 0 | 0 | 0 | 2 | 0 | 0 |
| 23 | DF | (Croatia) Zoran Nižić | 3 | 0 | 0 | 1 | 1 | 0 | 1 | 0 | 0 | 5 | 1 | 0 |
| 24 | DF | (Croatia) Marko Pejić | 2 | 0 | 0 | 0 | 0 | 0 | 1 | 0 | 0 | 3 | 0 | 0 |
| 28 | MF | (Croatia) Marko Bencun | 5 | 0 | 0 | 0 | 0 | 0 | 1 | 0 | 0 | 6 | 0 | 0 |
| 30 | DF | (Croatia) Josip Bašić | 1 | 0 | 0 | 0 | 0 | 0 | 0 | 0 | 0 | 1 | 0 | 0 |
| 31 | MF | (Bosnia and Herzegovina) Tino-Sven Sušić | 11 | 0 | 1 | 0 | 0 | 0 | 3 | 0 | 0 | 14 | 0 | 1 |
| 32 | MF | (Croatia) Fran Tudor | 5 | 0 | 0 | 0 | 0 | 0 | 1 | 0 | 0 | 6 | 0 | 0 |
| 33 | FW | (Croatia) Tomislav Kiš | 0 | 0 | 0 | 1 | 0 | 0 | 0 | 0 | 0 | 1 | 0 | 0 |
| 44 | MF | (Croatia) Ante Roguljić | 3 | 0 | 0 | 1 | 0 | 0 | 0 | 0 | 0 | 4 | 0 | 0 |
| 88 | MF | (Croatia) Frane Vojković | 2 | 0 | 0 | 0 | 0 | 0 | 0 | 0 | 0 | 2 | 0 | 0 |
| 91 | GK | (Croatia) Lovre Kalinić | 3 | 0 | 0 | 0 | 0 | 0 | 0 | 0 | 0 | 3 | 0 | 0 |
| 99 | MF | (Croatia) Andrija Balić | 0 | 0 | 0 | 1 | 0 | 0 | 0 | 0 | 0 | 1 | 0 | 0 |
| | | TOTALS | 82 | 4 | 3 | 9 | 1 | 0 | 14 | 0 | 0 | 105 | 5 | 3 |

Sources: Prva-HNL.hr, UEFA.com

=== Appearances and goals ===
| Number | Position | Player | Apps | Goals | Apps | Goals | Apps | Goals | Apps | Goals |
| Number | Position | Player | Total | | 1. HNL (Note: First number represents appearances in starting eleven, while the second number indicates a substitute appearance.) | | Europa League | | Croatian Cup | |
|---|---|---|---|---|---|---|---|---|---|---|
| 1 | GK | (Croatia) Dante Stipica | 3 | 0 | 1+0 | 0 | 0+0 | 0 | 2+0 | 0 |
| 2 | DF | (Croatia) Dino Mikanović | 1 | 0 | 0+0 | 0 | 1+0 | 0 | 0+0 | 0 |
| 2 | DF | (Argentina) Julián Velázquez | 19 | 0 | 15+2 | 0 | 0+0 | 0 | 2+0 | 0 |
| 3 | DF | (Croatia) Hrvoje Milić | 30 | 1 | 28+0 | 0 | 2+0 | 0 | 5+0 | 0 |
| 4 | DF | (Ukraine) Maksym Bilyi | 35 | 0 | 25+3 | 0 | 1+2 | 0 | 3+1 | 0 |
| 5 | DF | (Croatia) Goran Milović | 29 | 2 | 20+0 | 1 | 8+0 | 1 | 2+0 | 0 |
| 5 | DF | (Croatia) Lorenco Šimić | 11 | 1 | 6+3 | 1 | 0+0 | 0 | 2+0 | 0 |
| 5 | DF | (Kosovo) Ardian Ismajli | 1 | 0 | 1+0 | 0 | 0+0 | 0 | 0+0 | 0 |
| 6 | MF | (Brazil) Jefferson | 44 | 3 | 33+0 | 1 | 6+0 | 1 | 5+0 | 1 |
| 7 | MF | (Ukraine) Artem Radchenko | 6 | 0 | 1+3 | 0 | 0+2 | 0 | 0+0 | 0 |
| 8 | MF | (Croatia) Nikola Vlašić | 34 | 2 | 22+1 | 1 | 8+0 | 1 | 3+0 | 0 |
| 9 | FW | (Croatia) Anton Maglica | 23 | 4 | 1+15 | 0 | 1+4 | 2 | 1+1 | 2 |
| 9 | FW | (Argentina) Nicolas Velez | 5 | 0 | 3+1 | 0 | 0+0 | 0 | 0+1 | 0 |
| 11 | FW | (Cameroon) Franck Ohandza | 14 | 4 | 4+4 | 1 | 6+0 | 3 | 0+0 | 0 |
| 13 | GK | (Croatia) Ivo Grbić | 5 | 0 | 4+0 | 0 | 0+0 | 0 | 1+0 | 0 |
| 14 | MF | (Croatia) Tonći Mujan | 10 | 1 | 4+4 | 0 | 0+0 | 0 | 1+1 | 1 |
| 16 | FW | (Croatia) Ivan Mastelić | 12 | 0 | 9+3 | 0 | 0+0 | 0 | 0+0 | 0 |
| 17 | MF | (Croatia) Josip Juranović | 38 | 1 | 27+4 | 1 | 1+2 | 0 | 4+0 | 0 |
| 18 | MF | (Croatia) Mijo Caktaš | 28 | 13 | 17+0 | 6 | 8+0 | 4 | 3+0 | 3 |
| 19 | MF | (Croatia) Elvir Maloku | 35 | 3 | 9+13 | 2 | 3+5 | 0 | 2+3 | 1 |
| 19 | DF | (Croatia) Hrvoje Relota | 1 | 0 | 1+0 | 0 | 0+0 | 0 | 0+0 | 0 |
| 20 | MF | (Australia) Anthony Kalik | 12 | 0 | 8+3 | 0 | 0+0 | 0 | 1+0 | 0 |
| 21 | FW | (Croatia) Ivan Prskalo | 4 | 0 | 0+4 | 0 | 0+0 | 0 | 0+0 | 0 |
| 22 | FW | (Venezuela) Manuel Arteaga | 2 | 0 | 1+1 | 0 | 0+0 | 0 | 0+0 | 0 |
| 23 | DF | (Croatia) Zoran Nižić | 25 | 3 | 16+0 | 2 | 7+0 | 1 | 2+0 | 0 |
| 24 | DF | (Croatia) Marko Pejić | 13 | 0 | 4+3 | 0 | 5+0 | 0 | 0+1 | 0 |
| 26 | MF | (Croatia) Toma Bašić | 5 | 1 | 2+2 | 1 | 0+0 | 0 | 0+1 | 0 |
| 28 | MF | (Croatia) Marko Bencun | 19 | 4 | 10+6 | 3 | 0+0 | 0 | 2+1 | 1 |
| 30 | MF | (Croatia) Josip Bašić | 7 | 1 | 4+2 | 0 | 0+0 | 0 | 0+1 | 1 |
| 30 | FW | (Croatia) Josip Maganjić | 1 | 0 | 1+0 | 0 | 0+0 | 0 | 0+0 | 0 |
| 31 | MF | (Bosnia and Herzegovina) Tino-Sven Sušić | 37 | 15 | 27+0 | 12 | 2+3 | 0 | 5+0 | 3 |
| 32 | MF | (Croatia) Fran Tudor | 43 | 7 | 31+0 | 7 | 7+0 | 0 | 4+1 | 0 |
| 33 | FW | (Croatia) Tomislav Kiš | 10 | 4 | 4+2 | 2 | 1+3 | 2 | 0+0 | 0 |
| 44 | MF | (Croatia) Ante Roguljić | 25 | 2 | 7+12 | 1 | 5+1 | 0 | 2+0 | 1 |
| 88 | MF | (Croatia) Frane Vojković | 11 | 0 | 5+5 | 0 | 0+0 | 0 | 0+1 | 0 |
| 91 | GK | (Croatia) Lovre Kalinić | 41 | 0 | 31+0 | 0 | 8+0 | 0 | 2+0 | 0 |
| 99 | MF | (Croatia) Andrija Balić | 26 | 4 | 14+2 | 2 | 8+0 | 2 | 1+1 | 0 |

Sources: Prva-HNL.hr, UEFA.com

=== Overview of statistics ===
| Statistic | Overall | Prva HNL | Croatian Cup | Europa League |
|---|---|---|---|---|
| Most appearances | Jefferson (44) | Jefferson (33) | 5 players (5) | 6 players (8) |
| Most starts | Jefferson (44) | Jefferson (33) | Jefferson, Sušić & Milić (5) | 5 players (8) |
| Most substitute appearances | Maloku (21) | Maglica (15) | Maloku (3) | Maloku (5) |
| Most minutes played | Jefferson (3,881) | Jefferson (2,891) | Jefferson (450) | Kalinić (720) |
| Top goalscorer | Sušić (15) | Sušić (12) | Caktaš & Sušić (3) | Caktaš (4) |
| Most assists | Vlašić (10) | Milić (6) | Juranović & Tudor (3) | Vlašić (4) |
| Most yellow cards | Sušić (15) | Sušić (12) | Sušić (3) | Nižić (3) |
| Most red cards | Velázquez (2) | Velázquez (2) | – | Nižić (1) |
Last updated: 14 May 2016

== Transfers ==
=== In ===
| Date | Position | Player | From | Fee |
|---|---|---|---|---|
| 22 May 2015 | MF | (Ukraine) Artem Radchenko | Metalist Kharkiv | Free |
| 12 June 2015 | DF | (Ukraine) Maksym Bilyi | Zorya Luhansk | Free |
| 15 June 2015 | FW | (Cameroon) Franck Ohandza | Golden Lions SA | Free |
| 3 July 2015 | MF | (Brazil) Jefferson | CD Feirense | Free |
| 11 August 2015 | DF | (Croatia) Hrvoje Milić | FC Rostov | Free |
| 18 January 2016 | FW | (Argentina) Nicolás Vélez | NorthEast United | Free |

Total spending: ▼€0

=== Out ===
| Date | Position | Player | To | Fee |
|---|---|---|---|---|
| 8 June 2015 | GK | (Slovenia) Marko Ranilović | Zlaté Moravce | Free (released) |
| 8 June 2015 | DF | (Croatia) Goran Jozinović | Lugano | End of contract |
| 13 June 2015 | MF | (Croatia) Josip Vuković | Istra 1961 | Free |
| 26 June 2015 | FW | (Austria) Sandro Gotal | St. Gallen | €250.000 |
| 30 June 2015 | DF | (Bosnia and Herzegovina) Avdija Vršajević | Osmanlıspor | End of contract |
| 3 July 2015 | DF | (Croatia) Mario Maloča | Lechia Gdańsk | €200.000 |
| 16 July 2015 | DF | (Croatia) Dino Mikanović | AGF Aarhus | €400.000 |
| 7 July 2015 | MF | (Croatia) Ivo-Valentino Tomaš | VfB Oldenburg | Free (released) |
| 28 July 2015 | MF | (Croatia) Dejan Mezga | Apollon Limassol | Free (released) |
| 28 July 2015 | DF | (Croatia) Ivan Anton Vasilj | Zadar | Free (released) |
| 2 August 2015 | FW | (Croatia) Ivan Jakov Džoni | Rudeš | Free (released) |
| 4 August 2015 | FW | (Croatia) Tomislav Kiš | K.V. Kortrijk | €200.000 |
| 3 September 2015 | FW | (Ukraine) Artem Milevskyi | RNK Split | Free (released) |
| 3 January 2016 | MF | (Croatia) Ivan Tomičić | NK Imotski | End of contract |
| 5 January 2016 | FW | (Croatia) Anton Maglica | Apollon Limassol | Free |
| 21 January 2016 | MF | (Croatia) Mijo Caktaš | FC Rubin Kazan | 1 million € |
| 1 February 2016 | MF | (Croatia) Andrija Balić | Udinese Calcio | 3 million € |
| 9 February 2016 | DF | (Croatia) Goran Milović | Chongqing Lifan | €800.000 |

Total income: ▲5,85 million €

Total expenditure: ▲5,85 million €

=== Promoted from youth squad ===
| Position | Player | Age |
|---|---|---|
| MF | (Croatia) Toma Bašić | 19 |
| FW | (Croatia) Ivan Mastelić | 20 |
| DF | (Croatia) Lorenco Šimić | 20 |
| MF | (Croatia) Frane Vojković | 18 |
| DF | (Kosovo) Ardian Ismajli | 19 |

=== Loans in ===
| Date | Position | Player | From | Until |
|---|---|---|---|---|
| 15 June 2015 | FW | (Croatia) Ante Roguljić | Red Bull Salzburg | 31 May 2016 |
| 11 August 2015 | DF | (Argentina) Julián Velázquez | Palermo | 30 June 2016 |
| 21 January 2016 | DF | (Venezuela) Manuel Arteaga | Palermo | 31 December 2016 |
| 1 February 2016 | MF | (Australia) Anthony Kalik | Central Coast Mariners | 31 May 2016 |

=== Loans out ===
| Date | Position | Player | To | Until |
|---|---|---|---|---|
| 27 July 2015 | FW | (Croatia) Ivan Prskalo | Sesvete | 29 June 2016^{1} |
| 30 July 2015 | MF | (Croatia) Luka Pleština | Zagora Unešić | 31 December 2015 |
| 30 July 2015 | MF | (Croatia) Trojan Maloku | Hrvace | 30 December 2015 |
| 14 August 2015 | GK | (Croatia) Karlo Letica | Val Kaštel Stari | 31 December 2015 |
| 20 August 2015 | MF | (Croatia) Ante Kraljević | Neretvanac | 31 December 2015 |
| 20 August 2015 | FW | (Croatia) Ivan Mamut | Hrvace | 30 December 2015 |
| 20 August 2015 | MF | (Croatia) Ante Kraljević | Neretvanac | 31 December 2015 |
| 20 August 2015 | DF | (Croatia) Marin Karamarko | OSK Otok | 31 December 2015 |
| 31 August 2015 | GK | (Croatia) Fabjan Tomić | Hrvatski Dragovoljac | 31 December 2015 |
| 5 February 2016 | GK | (Croatia) Davor Matijaš | Primorac 1929 | 30 June 2016^{2} |
| 5 February 2016 | GK | (Croatia) Fabjan Tomić | Rudeš | 30 June 2016 |
| 5 February 2016 | DF | (Croatia) Petar Čeko | Primorac 1929 | 29 June 2016 |
| 15 February 2016 | GK | (Croatia) Marin Ljubić | Primorac 1929 | 15 June 2016 |
| 15 February 2016 | DF | (Croatia) Petar Bosančić | Dugopolje | 30 June 2016 |
| 15 February 2016 | DF | (Croatia) Alen Deanović | Marsonia | 30 June 2016 |
| 15 February 2016 | DF | (Croatia) Zvonimir Milić | Šibenik | 30 June 2016 |
| 15 February 2016 | MF | (Bosnia and Herzegovina) Ismar Hairlahović | Dugopolje | 17 June 2016 |
| 15 February 2016 | FW | (Croatia) Ivan Mamut | Primorac 1929 | 15 June 2016 |
| 22 February 2016 | MF | (Croatia) Luka Pleština | Zagora Unešić | 30 June 2016 |

^{1} Loan was terminated on 7 February 2016

^{2} Loan was terminated on 15 February 2016

Sources: Glasilo Hrvatskog nogometnog saveza
