= Nikola Vlašić =

Croatian association football player (born 1997)

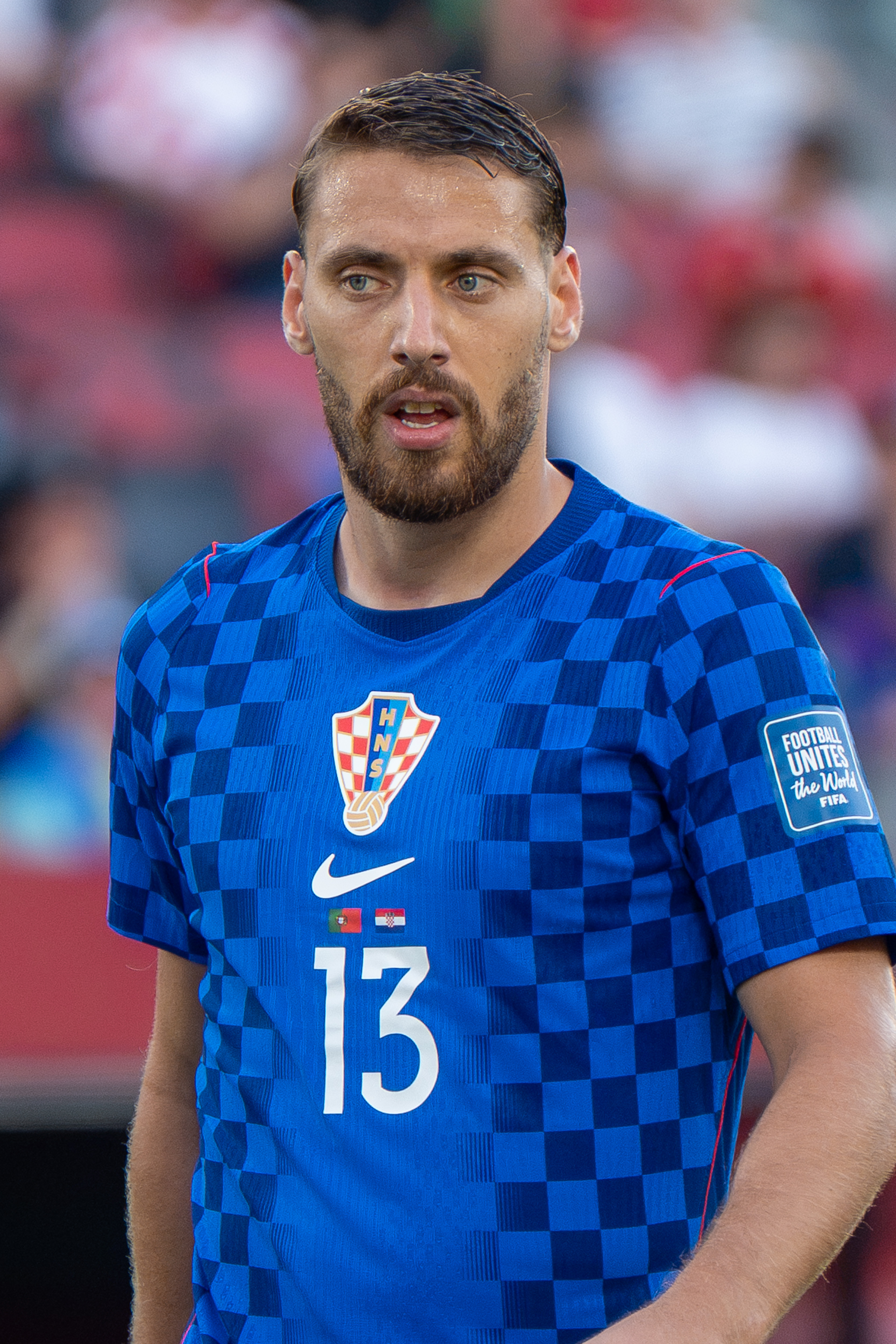
- Vlašić with Croatia in 2026

Personal information
- Full name: Nikola Vlašić
- Date of birth: 4 October 1997 (age 29)
- Place of birth: Split, Croatia
- Height: 1.79 m (5 ft 10 1/2 in)
- Position: Attacking midfielder

Team information
- Current team: Torino
- Number: 10

Youth career
- 2006–2009: Omladinac Vranjic
- 2010–2014: Hajduk Split

Senior career*
Years	Team	Apps	(Gls)
2014–2017	Hajduk Split	86	(11)
2017–2019	Everton	12	(0)
2018–2019	→ CSKA Moscow (loan)	25	(5)
2019–2021	CSKA Moscow	61	(23)
2021–2023	West Ham United	19	(1)
2022–2023	→ Torino (loan)	34	(5)
2023–	Torino	108	(17)

International career^{‡}
2012–2013	Croatia U16	8	(1)
2013	Croatia U17	8	(1)
2014	Croatia U18	2	(1)
2015	Croatia U19	3	(0)
2015–2019	Croatia U21	17	(6)
2017–	Croatia	70	(11)
Medal record
Men's football
Representing Croatia
FIFA World Cup
Third place	2022 Qatar
UEFA Nations League
Runner-up	2023 Netherlands
- * Club domestic league appearances and goals as of 21:23, 23 October 2026 (UTC) ‡ National team caps and goals as of 12 November 2026

Nikola Vlašić (Croatian pronunciation: [nǐkola ʋlâʃitɕ]; born 4 October 1997) is a Croatian professional footballer who plays as an attacking midfielder for Serie A club Torino and the Croatia national team.

Born into a prominent Croatian sports family, Nikola is a youth product of Hajduk Split academy. He made his senior debut in summer 2014, making The Guardian's Next Generation list later that year. In 2017, his performances earned him a move to Everton; however, after an unsuccessful season, he was loaned out to CSKA Moscow who made the move permanent upon the end of the season.

Vlašić made his international debut in 2017, before becoming a regular international after Croatia's 2018 FIFA World Cup campaign. He represented his country at the UEFA Euro 2020, 2022 FIFA World Cup, Euro 2024 and 2026 World Cup.

== Club career ==
=== Hajduk Split ===
Vlašić joined the Omladinac Vranjic academy, before he was brought to Hajduk Split, aged 12. He excelled at youth club level, and in the 2013–14 season he formed a potent midfield partnership for the Hajduk U17 team with Andrija Balić, which resulted in the team finishing the first half of the season in first place, without a single loss. The two then received and signed professional contracts, and were moved to the U19 team, where he played regularly.

He made his first team debut in the UEFA Europa League qualifying match on 17 July 2014, playing in the away match against Dundalk. Scoring on his debut, he became Hajduk Split's youngest scorer in international competitions, aged 16 years and 9 months, 2 months less than the previous record holder Mario Tičinović. That season, Vlašić went on to make 37 appearances in all competitions, scoring four goals.

On 30 June 2016, Hajduk announced that Vlašić had been appointed vice-captain of the club, with Lovre Kalinić continuing to be the captain. As Kalinić was on extended holidays as a result of being part of the Croatian squad for the UEFA Euro 2016, Vlašić captained Hajduk for the first time on 14 July, the season opening fixture; a 2–2 away draw against CSM Politehnica Iași in the second round of the 2016–17 Europa League qualifying phase. Despite his tender age, Vlašić would captain the side four more times that season.

=== Everton ===
On 31 August 2017, Vlašić signed a five-year contract with Premier League club Everton for a fee of around £10 million, which is the Hajduk Split record transfer. Vlašić impressed Everton manager Ronald Koeman and director of football Steve Walsh when Everton and Hajduk faced each other in the 2017–18 UEFA Europa League play-off round. Vlašić scored his first goal for Everton on his debut at Goodison Park on 28 September in a 2–2 draw with Apollon Limassol in the Europa League. He scored in the return leg on 7 December, as Everton won 3–0. After making only 19 appearances in all competitions, Vlašić was told at end of the season that he was not part of the future plans of new coach Marco Silva.

=== CSKA Moscow ===
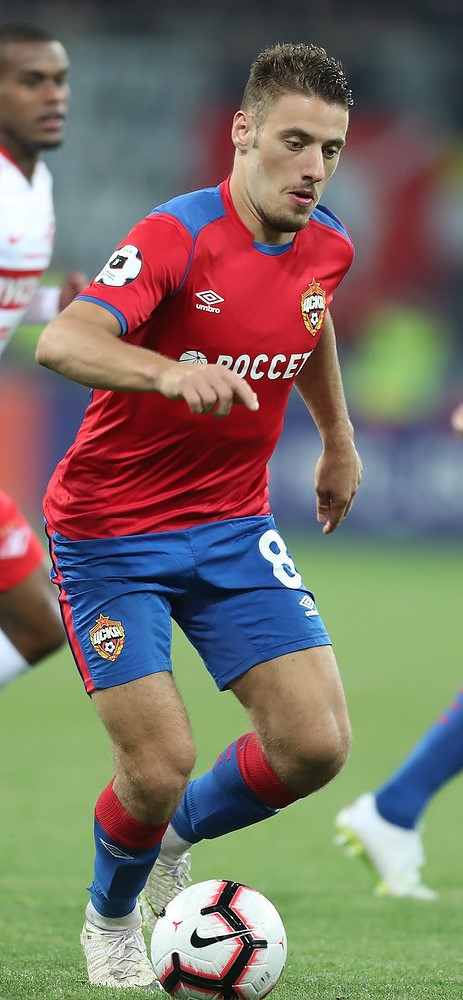
Vlašić playing for CSKA Moscow in 2018

On 15 August 2018, Russian club CSKA Moscow announced that Vlašić joined them on loan for the 2018–19 season. Three days later, he made his league debut in a 3–0 victory over Arsenal Tula. In his Champions League debut on 19 September, he scored both goals for CSKA Moscow in a 2–2 draw with Viktoria Plzeň. On 2 October Vlašić scored the only goal in a 1–0 home victory against the ruling champions Real Madrid in the Champions League. In the return leg on 12 December, he provided Arnór Sigurðsson with an assist for the third goal in a 3–0 victory, which is Madrid's highest ever European home defeat. Despite this, the Muscovites ended last in their group crashing out of the tournament. On 28 April 2019, he was sent off in a 2–0 defeat to Krasnodar. Vlašić finished the season with eight goals and seven assists.

Satisfied with his performances, CSKA announced the signing of Vlašić on a five-year contract for an undisclosed fee on 19 June from Everton. On 22 September, he won and successfully converted a penalty, provided Fyodor Chalov with an assist and scored in a 3–2 victory over Krasnodar. On 24 November, he scored the only goal in a 1–0 victory over Krylia Sovetov Samara. On 12 December, Vlašić scored the only goal in a 1–0 away victory over Espanyol in the Europa League. Nevertheless, CSKA ended last in their group crashing out of the tournament. On 30 June 2020, Vlašić scored both goals in a 2–0 derby win over Spartak Moscow. He finished his second season at the club with 13 goals and seven assists, as CSKA finished fourth in the league.

At the beginning of the 2020–21 season, Vlašić sparked interest from Napoli, Atalanta and Zenit Saint Petersburg; however, CSKA refused to sell the player. In his first game of the season, against ruling champions Zenit on 19 August, he scored CSKA's only goal in the 2–1 defeat. On 13 September, he scored in another Main Moscow derby as CSKA defeated Spartak 3–1. On 21 December, Vlašić was named Russian Premier League, Russian Football Union and Sport Express Footballer of the Year. He won 251 points, 138 ahead of second-placed Aleksei Miranchuk.

At the beginning of the 2021–22 season, Vlašić's relationship with CSKA deteriorated due to the club's hesitance to sell him.

=== West Ham United ===
On 31 August 2021, Vlašić joined Premier League club West Ham United on a five-year contract for an undisclosed fee. Some Croatian media outlets reported it to be €30 million with add-ons, which would make it the fourth most expensive transfer of a Croatian player in history.

Vlašić made his West Ham debut on 11 September in a goalless draw with Southampton. His first goal contribution for West Ham occurred on 25 November in a 2–0 victory over Rapid Vienna in the Europa League, when he provided Andriy Yarmolenko with an assist for the first goal.

On 28 December, Vlašić scored his debut and only goal for West Ham, in a 4–1 victory over Watford. By the end of the season, he had played 552 minutes in league games, the least in his senior career. The aforementioned assist and goal were his only goal contributions.

=== Torino ===
On 11 August 2022, Vlašić joined Torino on-loan for the remainder of the 2022–23 season with an option to buy the player at the end of the loan. The move was made permanent in August 2023 when he signed for Torino for an undisclosed fee. He had made 31 appearances for West Ham scoring one goal.

== International career ==
=== Youth ===
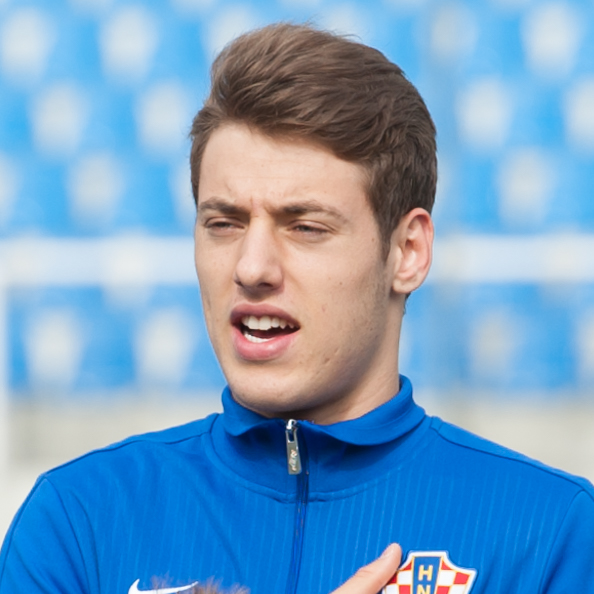
Vlašić with Croatia U19 in 2015

Vlašić made his debut for Croatia U16 at the age of 14, playing regularly with older teammates at U17 and U18 levels as well.

Vlašić was named in Croatia's squad for UEFA Under-21 Euro 2019. He scored in a 4–1 defeat against Romania and a 3–3 draw with England, on 18 and 24 June respectively.

=== Senior ===
==== Early senior career ====
On 28 May 2017, Vlašić made his debut for the senior team in a friendly match against Mexico. On 18 November 2018, he provided Andrej Kramarić with an assist in a UEFA Nations League match against England for a 0–1 lead, which Croatia eventually lost 2–1.

On 6 September 2019, Vlašić scored his first goal in a Euro 2020 qualifying match against Slovakia for a 0–1 lead. Croatia won the game 0–4. On 13 October, he scored yet another opening goal in a 1–1 draw with Wales. On 16 November, Vlašić scored the equalizer against Slovakia at home, leading to Croatia's 3–1 victory and qualification for the tournament. However, in March 2020, the tournament was postponed for one year due to the COVID-19 pandemic.

==== UEFA Nations League and World Cup ====
On 11 October 2020, Vlašić scored the opener in a 2–1 UEFA Nations League victory against Sweden at Stadion Maksimir and followed it up three days later with a goal in a 2–1 loss to reigning world champions France at the same location.

On 17 May 2021, Vlašić was selected in Zlatko Dalić's 26-man squad for the UEFA Euro 2020, marking Vlašić's first major tournament appearance. He started off the bench in Croatia's first two matches against England and the Czech Republic. On 22 June, Vlašić was named Star of the Match in the 3–1 victory against Scotland after scoring an opening goal, which led Croatia to Round of 16.

On 9 November 2022, Vlašić was named in Dalić's 26-man squad for the 2022 FIFA World Cup. In the round of 16 and quarter-final matches against Japan and Brazil, respectively on 5 and 9 December — both of which led to a penalty shootout — Vlašić was the first to shoot for Croatia, scoring both times as Croatia progressed to the semi-final.

On 18 May 2026, Vlašić was selected in the 26-man squad for the 2026 FIFA World Cup. A month later, on 27 June, he scored his first World Cup goal in a 2–1 victory over Ghana, helping his country secure a place in the knockout stage.

== Personal life ==
Vlašić was born in Split to the family of former cross-country skier Venera Milin and athletics coach Joško Vlašić. His older sister is the world champion high jumper Blanka Vlašić. His father hails from Dubrava near Tisno. His mother was born and raised in Delnice, but her roots are from Jezera on the island of Murter. Vlašić's future football career was viewed as his father's "project", who started training him personally ever since he was four years old.

On 22 May 2021, Vlašić married his long-time girlfriend Ana in St. Lawrence's Church in Split. In late June of the same year, they became parents of a baby boy whom they named Noa.

== Career statistics ==
=== Club ===
As of match played 23 October 2026

Appearances and goals by club, season and competition
Club	Season	League			National cup		League cup		Europe		Total	
Club	Season	Division	Apps	Goals	Apps	Goals	Apps	Goals	Apps	Goals	Apps	Goals
Hajduk Split	2014–15	Prva HNL	27	3	5	0	—		5 (Note: Appearances in UEFA Europa League)	1	37	4
Hajduk Split	2015–16	Prva HNL	23	1	3	0	—		8	1	34	2
Hajduk Split	2016–17	Prva HNL	30	4	1	0	—		6	0	37	4
Hajduk Split	2017–18	Prva HNL	6	3	0	0	—		6	0	12	3
Hajduk Split	Total		86	11	9	0	—		25	2	120	13
Everton	2017–18	Premier League	12	0	0	0	1	0	6	2	19	2
CSKA Moscow (loan)	2018–19	Russian Premier League	25	5	0	0	—		6 (Note: Appearances in UEFA Champions League)	3	31	8
CSKA Moscow	2019–20	Russian Premier League	30	12	2	0	—		6	1	38	13
CSKA Moscow	2020–21	Russian Premier League	26	11	3	1	—		5	0	34	12
CSKA Moscow	2021–22	Russian Premier League	5	0	0	0	—		—		5	0
CSKA Moscow	CSKA total		86	28	5	1	—		17	4	108	33
West Ham United	2021–22	Premier League	19	1	3	0	3	0	6	0	31	1
Torino (loan)	2022–23	Serie A	34	5	3	0	—		—		37	5
Torino	2023–24	Serie A	33	3	2	0	—		—		35	3
Torino	2024–25	Serie A	30	5	0	0	—		—		30	5
Torino	2025–26	Serie A	37	8	4	1	—		—		41	9
Torino	2026–27	Serie A	8	1	2	0	—		—		10	1
Torino	Torino total		142	22	11	1	—		—		153	23
Career total			345	62	29	2	4	0	54	8	431	72

=== International ===
As of match played 12 November 2026

Appearances and goals by national team and year
National team	Year	Apps	Goals
Croatia	2017	2	0
Croatia	2018	2	0
Croatia	2019	7	3
Croatia	2020	6	2
Croatia	2021	16	2
Croatia	2022	15	0
Croatia	2023	5	0
Croatia	2024	4	1
Croatia	2025	3	2
Croatia	2026	10	1
Total		70	11

Scores and results list Croatia's goal tally first.

List of international goals scored by Nikola Vlašić
No.	Date	Venue	Cap	Opponent	Score	Result	Competition
1	6 September 2019	Anton Malatinský Stadium, Trnava, Slovakia	6	Slovakia	1–0	4–0	UEFA Euro 2020 qualifying
2	13 October 2019	Cardiff City Stadium, Cardiff, Wales	9	Wales	1–0	1–1	UEFA Euro 2020 qualifying
3	16 November 2019	Stadion Rujevica, Rijeka, Croatia	10	Slovakia	1–1	3–1	UEFA Euro 2020 qualifying
4	11 October 2020	Stadion Maksimir, Zagreb, Croatia	14	Sweden	1–0	2–1	2020–21 UEFA Nations League A
5	14 October 2020	Stadion Maksimir, Zagreb, Croatia	15	France	1–1	1–2	2020–21 UEFA Nations League A
6	22 June 2021	Hampden Park, Glasgow, Scotland	25	Scotland	1–0	3–1	UEFA Euro 2020
7	7 September 2021	Stadion Poljud, Split, Croatia	29	Slovenia	3–0	3–0	2022 FIFA World Cup qualification
8	26 March 2024	New Administrative Capital Stadium, New Administrative Capital, Egypt	55	Egypt	1–1	4–2	2024 FIFA Series
9	14 November 2025	Stadion Rujevica, Rijeka, Croatia	59	Faroe Islands	3–1	3–1	2026 FIFA World Cup qualification
10	17 November 2025	Podgorica City Stadium, Podgorica, Montenegro	60	Montenegro	3–2	3–2	2026 FIFA World Cup qualification
11	27 June 2026	Lincoln Financial Field, Philadelphia, United States	65	Ghana	2–1	2–1	2026 FIFA World Cup

== Honours ==
Croatia

- FIFA World Cup third place: 2022
- UEFA Nations League runner-up: 2022–23

Individual

- Russian Premier League Player of the Month: September 2018, December 2018, July 2020
- Sport-Express, Russian Football Union and Russian Premier League Footballer of the Year: 2020
- Serie A Team of the Season: 2025–26
