= Josip Bašić =

Croatian footballer

Personal information
- Date of birth: 2 March 1996 (age 30)
- Place of birth: Split, Croatia
- Height: 1.79 m (5 ft 10 in)
- Positions: Right back; right winger

Youth career
- 2004–2007: Primorac Stobreč
- 2007–2009: Omladinac Vranjic
- 2010–2013: Hajduk Split

Senior career*
| Years | Team | Apps | (Gls) |
| 2012–2020 | Hajduk Split | 30 | (1) |
| 2014–2019 | → Hajduk Split B | 44 | (7) |

International career^{‡}
| 2010 | Croatia U14 | 2 | (0) |
| 2010–2011 | Croatia U15 | 6 | (4) |
| 2012 | Croatia U16 | 6 | (2) |
| 2011–2013 | Croatia U17 | 23 | (7) |
| 2014–2015 | Croatia U19 | 5 | (1) |
- * Club domestic league appearances and goals as of 5 July 2020 ‡ National team caps and goals as of 31 March 2015

Josip Bašić (Croatian pronunciation: [jǒsip bâʃitɕ]; born 2 March 1996) is a former Croatian professional footballer who played as a right back or right winger. He spent his whole career playing for Hajduk Split in the Prva HNL. He is notable for becoming the youngest debutant in league history in 2012.

== Club career ==
Bašić joined Hajduk Split's youth academy in 2010, aged 13, after stints at Primorac Stobreč and Omladinac Vranjic. A regular Croatian youth international he established himself as the right wing of choice for the under-17 team at the beginning of the 2011–12 season, aged only 15, even playing some games for the under-19 team, both as a winger and a right back, towards the end of the season. He was called up to the first team for the game against Dinamo Zagreb on 29 September 2012, starting on the bench, but making his debut by entering for Marko Bencun in the 57th minute, thus becoming the youngest debutant in league history at just 16 years 6 months and 27 days of age.

Bašić scored his first goal for Hajduk's senior team in the national league in November 2013, against Slaven Belupo.

Throughout his tenure at the club, Bašić was plagued by a string of injuries, which ultimately resulted in Hajduk releasing Bašić after his contract expired on June 30, 2020.

== International career ==
Bašić captained the Croatia national under-17 football team at the 2013 UEFA European Under-17 Championship. The Croatian U-17 side had quality players such as Alen Halilović, Duje Ćaleta-Car, Ivo Grbić, Robert Murić and Fran Brodić but were ultimately unable to make it out of the group stage finishing 5th at the tournament. Bašić later managed to qualify for the 2013 FIFA U-17 World Cup but could not play do to injury.
