= Marko Pejić =

Croatian footballer

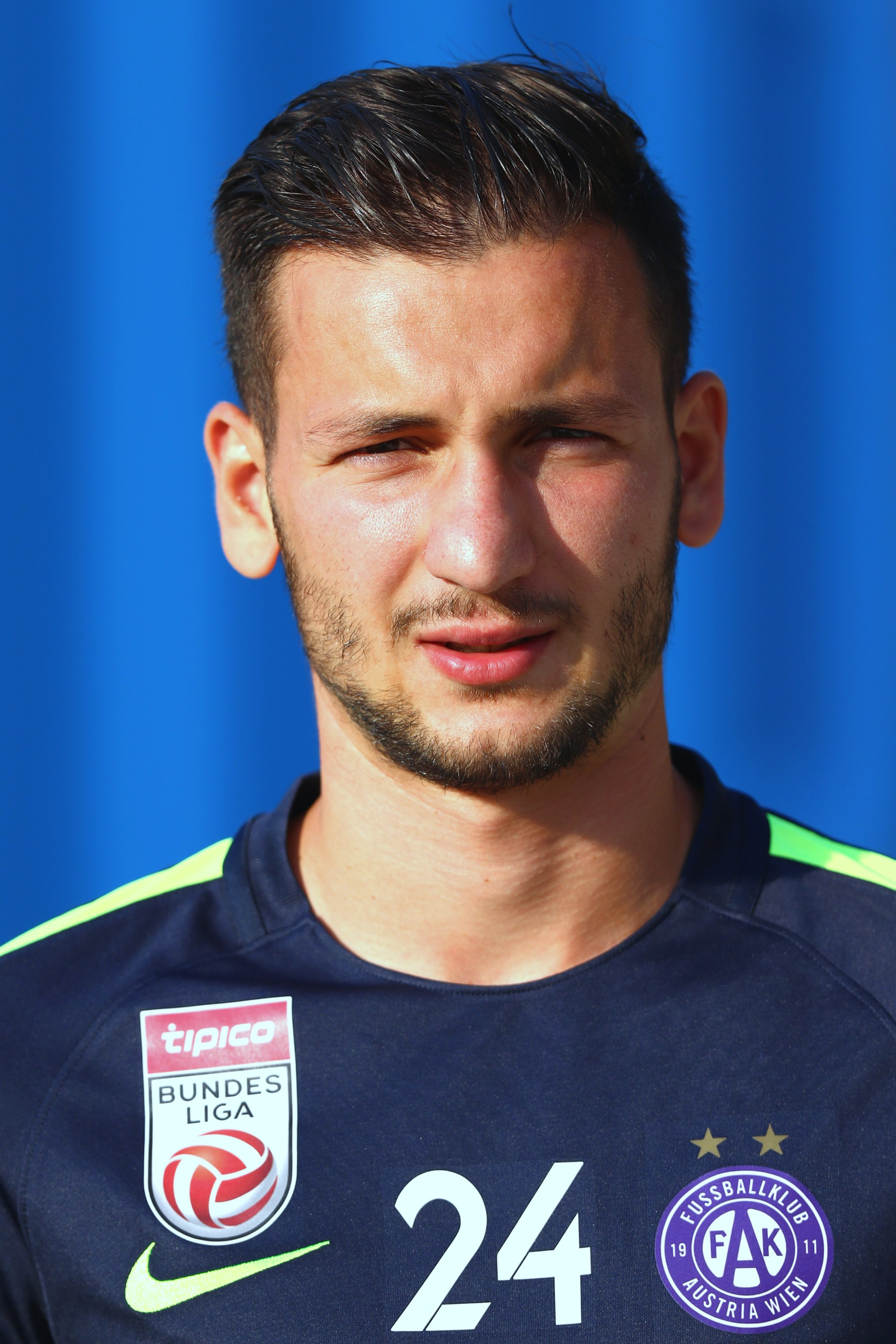

Personal information
- Date of birth: 24 February 1995 (age 31)
- Place of birth: Zagreb, Croatia
- Height: 1.74 m (5 ft 8 1/2 in)
- Positions: Left back; defensive midfielder

Youth career
- 2004–2013: Dinamo Zagreb
- 2013–2014: A.C. Siena

Senior career*
Years	Team	Apps	(Gls)
2014	Sesvete	10	(0)
2015–2016	Hajduk Split	13	(0)
2015–2016	→ Hajduk Split II	23	(1)
2017	Austria Wien	1	(0)
2017–2019	Austria Wien II	67	(3)
2019–2021	Koper	5	(1)
2022–2023	Kauno Žalgiris	29	(1)

International career
2011	Croatia U16	3	(0)
2011	Croatia U17	6	(0)
2015	Croatia U21	3	(0)
- * Club domestic league appearances and goals as of 28 June 2023 (UTC)

Marko Pejić (born 24 February 1995 in Zagreb) is a Croatian football player.

== Club career ==
Marko passed the football school of GNK Dinamo academy. His first senior club was Italian club A.C. Siena. Season later he returned to Croatia and signed for NK Sesvete. On 26 January 2015 he signed a contract with HNK Hajduk until summer 2018.

In January 2017, Pejić joined Austrian club FK Austria Wien. At the end of 2017, he was relegated to the club's second team which he played for until the summer 2019, where his contract expired. On 3 October 2019, he joined Slovenian club FC Koper on a contract for the rest of the season.

== Career statistics ==
As of match played 17 December 2017

Appearances and goals by club, season and competition
Club	Season	League			National Cup		Other		Total	
Club	Season	Division	Apps	Goals	Apps	Goals	Apps	Goals	Apps	Goals
Sesvete	2014–15	2. HNL	10	0	0	0	–		10	0
Hajduk Split	2014–15	1. HNL	2	0	0	0	0	0	2	0
Hajduk Split	2015–16	1. HNL	7	0	1	0	5 (Note: Appearances in the Europa League)	0	13	0
Hajduk Split	2016–17	1. HNL	4	0	1	0	0	0	5	0
Hajduk Split	Total		13	0	2	0	5	0	20	0
Austria Vienna II	2016–17	Regionalliga Ost	8	0	–		–		8	0
Austria Vienna II	2017–18	Regionalliga Ost	15	0	–		–		15	0
Austria Vienna II	Total		23	0	–		0	0	23	0
Austria Vienna	2017–18	Österreichische; Bundesliga	1	0	0	0	0	0	1	0
Career total			47	0	2	0	5	0	30	0
