= Maksym Bilyi (footballer, born 1990) =

Ukrainian footballer

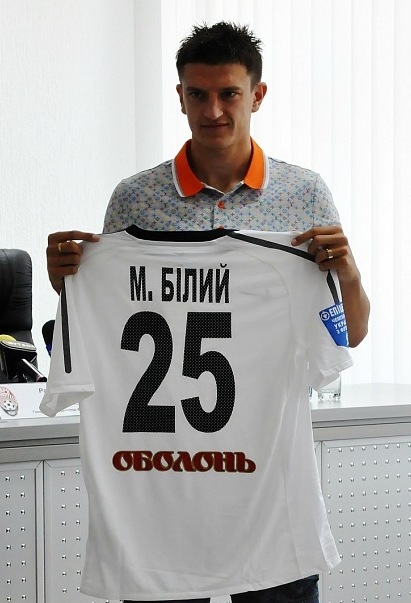

Personal information
- Full name: Maksym Ihorovych Bilyi
- Date of birth: 21 June 1990 (age 36)
- Place of birth: Vasylkivka, Soviet Union (now Ukraine)
- Height: 1.87 m (6 ft 2 in)
- Position: Defender

Team information
- Current team: Oleksandriya (assistant manager)

Youth career
- 2004–2007: Shakhtar Donetsk

Senior career*
Years	Team	Apps	(Gls)
2007–2011	Shakhtar Donetsk	0	(0)
2007–2010	→ Shakhtar-3 Donetsk	69	(4)
2010–2011	→ Stal Alchevsk (loan)	31	(0)
2011–2015	Zorya Luhansk	86	(2)
2015–2016	Hajduk Split	32	(0)
2017	Anzhi Makhachkala	0	(0)
2017–2018	Mariupol	27	(1)
2019–2020	Zorya Luhansk	6	(1)
2020	→ Rukh Lviv (loan)	10	(0)
2020–2022	Rukh Lviv	33	(0)
2022–2023	Chornomorets Odesa	6	(0)
2023	Rukh-2 Lviv	2	(0)

International career
2006	Ukraine U16	11	(1)
2005–2007	Ukraine U17	21	(4)
2007–2008	Ukraine U18	8	(0)
2008–2009	Ukraine U19	9	(0)
2011	Ukraine U21	1	(0)

Managerial career
- 2026–: Oleksandriya (assistant)
Medal record
Men's football
Representing Ukraine
UEFA European Under-19 Championship
Winner	2009 Ukraine
- * Club domestic league appearances and goals

Maksym Ihorovych Bilyi (Ukrainian: Максим Ігорович Білий; born 21 June 1990) is a Ukrainian former professional footballer who played as a defender and current assistant manager at Oleksandriya.

== Club career ==
=== Hajduk Split ===
Bilyi joined 1. HNL side HNK Hajduk Split in June 2015. He made his debut for the Whites in the 2015–16 UEFA Europa League 1st Qualifying Round match against Estonian side JK Sillamäe Kalev at the Sillamäe Kalevi Stadium on 2 July 2016. He came on as a substitute, playing the last quarter of an hour. He also came on as a substitute in the second leg, a 6–2 win at the Stadion Hrvatski vitezovi, playing the last 10 minutes. Bilyi made his 1. HNL debut against Slaven Belupo at the Poljud Stadium, playing the full 90 minutes in a 2–2 draw. The central defender went on to make himself a key part of the Hajduk starting eleven, playing 35 matches in all competitions in the 2015–16 HNK Hajduk Split season. On 4 September 2016, Bilyi was released by Hajduk.

=== FC Anzhi Makhachkala ===
On 4 February 2017, Bilyi signed for FC Anzhi Makhachkala until the end of the 2017–18 season. On 19 June 2017, he was released by Anzhi after not playing any games for the main squad.

=== FC Mariupol ===
On 16 July 2017, Bilyi signed for FC Mariupol.

== Honours ==
2009 UEFA European Under-19 Football Championship: Champion
