= Jefferson (footballer, born 1993) =

Brazilian footballer

Personal information
- Full name: Jefferson de Jesus Santos
- Date of birth: 14 April 1993 (age 33)
- Place of birth: Goiânia, Brazil
- Height: 1.90 m (6 ft 3 in)
- Positions: Defensive midfielder; centre-back

Team information
- Current team: Marsaxlokk
- Number: 3

Youth career
- Santarritense
- 2011–2013: Ponte Preta

Senior career*
Years	Team	Apps	(Gls)
2013–2014	Ribeirão	14	(1)
2014	→ Santa Clara (loan)	7	(0)
2014	Leixões	1	(0)
2014–2015	Feirense	37	(4)
2015–2017	Hajduk Split	59	(2)
2017–2020	Chaves	61	(0)
2020–2021	Vilafranquense	25	(1)
2021	Al-Jabalain	17	(1)
2022	Iporá	23	(0)
2022–2023	Amora	18	(1)
2023–2024	Al-Qaisumah	14	(0)
2024	Goiânia	10	(0)
2024	ABECAT		
2024–	Marsaxlokk	4	(0)
- * Club domestic league appearances and goals as of 16 October 2024

Jefferson de Jesus Santos (born 14 April 1993), known simply as Jefferson, is a Brazilian professional footballer who plays as a defensive midfielder or centre-back for Maltese side Marsaxlokk.

== Club career ==
=== Early years and Portugal ===
Born in Goiânia, Goiás, Jefferson finished his youth career with Associação Atlética Ponte Preta. He made his senior debut in Portugal, starting out at third division club G.D. Ribeirão.

In the January 2014 transfer window, Jefferson signed with C.D. Santa Clara in the Segunda Liga. He played his first match as a professional on 16 March, starting but being booked and replaced in the 31st minute of an eventual 3–1 away loss against F.C. Penafiel, as he risked being sent off.

Jefferson continued competing at that level in the following seasons, with Leixões S.C. and C.D. Feirense. He annulled his one-year contract with the former side in June 2014, claiming personal reasons.

=== Hajduk Split ===
During his spell in Portugal, Jefferson was scouted by the director of football of HNK Hajduk Split, Goran Vučević. He joined the Croatian team in June 2015, but was unable to sign or train with them until his contract with Feirense ran out, making him miss out on training camp in Slovenia and Austria. He made his competitive debut on 12 July, featuring the full 90 minutes in a 1–1 draw at GNK Dinamo Zagreb, gathering praise from the media for his performance and being named Player of the match by Jutarnji list for his role in neutralising opposing player Ante Ćorić.

On 23 July 2015, Jefferson scored from longe-range in a 4–1 home win over FC Koper in the second qualifying round of the UEFA Europa League. He was the most utilised player for the team during the season, and arguably and the best in his position since Josip Radošević, being praised for his tackling skills but also criticised for his passing. On 10 April 2016, in a home game against NK Istra 1961, he was made captain in the last minutes, thus becoming the first Brazilian in Hajduk history to sport the armband.

=== Chaves ===
Jefferson returned to Portugal in the 2017 off-season, signing a three-year contract with G.D. Chaves. He finished his first season in the Primeira Liga with 26 appearances, helping to a sixth-place finish.

=== Vilafranquense ===
In October 2020, Jefferson signed a one-season contract for Liga Portugal 2 side Vilafranquense.

=== Al-Qaisumah ===
On 14 August 2023, Jefferson joined Saudi First Division League club Al-Qaisumah.
