= Josip Maganjić =

Croatian footballer (born 1999)

Personal information
- Date of birth: 6 January 1999 (age 27)
- Place of birth: Sinj, Croatia
- Height: 1.84 m (6 ft 0 in)
- Position: Striker

Team information
- Current team: NK Hrvace
- Number: 7

Youth career
- 2005–2008: Junak Sinj
- 2008–2011: Glavice
- 2011–2013: Junak Sinj
- 2013–2015: Hajduk Split
- 2016–2021: Fiorentina

Senior career*
Years	Team	Apps	(Gls)
2015–2016	Hajduk Split	1	(0)
2016–2021	Fiorentina	0	(0)
2019–2020	→ Istra 1961 (loan)	9	(0)
2021	Široki Brijeg	4	(0)
2021–2022	Dugopolje	13	(2)
2022–2023	Solin	22	(2)
2023–2024	Peyia 2014	15	(6)
2024-	NK Hrvace	26	(11)

International career
2014	Croatia U15	5	(3)
2015–2016	Croatia U17	8	(0)
2016–2017	Croatia U19	5	(0)
2019	Croatia U20	1	(0)
- * Club domestic league appearances and goals as of 27 June 2025

Josip Maganjić (born 6 January 1999) is a Croatian professional footballer who plays as a forward for 2. NL club NK Hrvace.

== Career ==
Born in nearby Sinj, Maganjić started his youth career at the local NK Junak Sinj, moving for two seasons to nearby NK Glavice, aged 10, at the age of 12, he returned to Junak, but got called up by Hajduk Split only a season later. He found his place in the team quickly, becoming an U-15 youth international during his first season at the club. In 2016, as an U-17 youth international and considered to be one of the top players in the country in his age bracket, he was called up to the senior team that was missing 14 players for the last game of the season, along with Ardian Ismajli and Hrvoje Relota. He made his first team debut thereby at 14 May 2016 in a 3–2 away win against NK Zagreb, replaced in the 65th minute due to injury by Ivan Prskalo.
