= Ivan Mastelić =

Croatian football forward (born 1996)

Personal information
- Date of birth: 2 January 1996 (age 30)
- Place of birth: Marktoberdorf, Germany
- Height: 1.78 m (5 ft 10 in)
- Positions: Forward; winger

Team information
- Current team: Junak Sinj
- Number: 10

Youth career
- 2006–2008: Tekstilac Sinj
- 2008–2012: Junak Sinj
- 2013–2015: Hajduk Split

Senior career*
Years	Team	Apps	(Gls)
2012–2013	Junak Sinj	20	(1)
2014–2017	Hajduk Split	12	(0)
2014–2016	→ Hajduk Split B	45	(14)
2017	→ Cibalia (loan)	9	(0)
2018–2019	Solin	33	(2)
2019–	Junak Sinj	22	(9)
- * Club domestic league appearances and goals as of 17:31, 18 July 2020 (UTC)

Ivan Mastelić (born 2 January 1996) is a Croatian football forward, currently playing for NK Junak Sinj.

== Club career ==
Born in Germany, Mastelić moved back at the age of 2 with his mother to the family's native Brnaze, near Sinj, in Croatia, and he started training football there, at the lower-tier Tekstilac Sinj. A versatile player, starting out as a midfielder, but playing at center-back, winger and a forward, he moved, at the age of 12 and at the behest of coach Slaven Lakić, to the second-tier Junak Sinj. He became a first-team regular, now more firmly a forward or a winger, at the age of 16, amassing 20 caps, with a single goal. That did not, however, go unnoticed, and he was snapped up by nearby giants HNK Hajduk Split, where he joined the academy.

At the Hajduk academy, he played mostly as a winger for the U19 team in the 2013/14 season, the forward position being taken by Ivan Prskalo, and, the following year, he established himself as a first-team regular at the club's third-tier reserve side. He made his first-team debut in the club's 19.12.2015 away win against NK Istra 1961, coming in for Fran Tudor in the 89th minute of the match.

Since Hajduk had injury problems in the second half of the season, Mastelić made it into the first team lineup thanks to manager Damir Burić, but he didn't manage to score any goals.

In August 2019 it was reported, that Mastelić had returned to NK Junak Sinj.
