= Artem Radchenko =

Ukrainian footballer

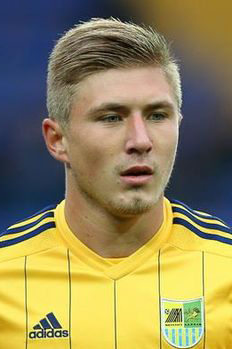

Personal information
- Full name: Artem Olehovych Radchenko
- Date of birth: 2 January 1995 (age 31)
- Place of birth: Kharkiv, Ukraine
- Height: 1.75 m (5 ft 9 in)
- Position: Midfielder

Youth career
- 2008–2011: Metalist Kharkiv

Senior career*
Years	Team	Apps	(Gls)
2011–2014	Metalist Kharkiv	11	(0)
2015	Hoverla Uzhhorod	0	(0)
2015–2016	Hajduk Split	4	(0)
2015	Hajduk Split II	6	(0)
2018	Dnepr Mogilev	7	(0)
2018–2019	Mykolaiv	25	(3)
2018	→ Mykolaiv-2	1	(0)
2020	Jelgava	9	(0)
2021–2022	Peremoha Dnipro	30	(7)
2022	Jonava	13	(0)
2023	Dainava	36	(3)
2024	Hibernians	13	(0)
2024–2025	TransINVEST	42	(5)

International career^{‡}
2010–2012	Ukraine U16	14	(4)
2010–2012	Ukraine U17	16	(3)
2012–2013	Ukraine U18	9	(3)
2013–2014	Ukraine U19	16	(4)
2015	Ukraine U20	1	(0)
2016	Ukraine U21	5	(2)
2019	Ukraine (students)		
- * Club domestic league appearances and goals as of 17 February 2026 ‡ National team caps and goals as of 14 December 2016

Artem Olehovych Radchenko (Ukrainian: Артем Олегович Радченко; born 2 January 1995) is a Ukrainian professional footballer who plays for Lithuanian club TransINVEST.

== Career ==
Radchenko is the product of the Metalist Kharkiv Youth School System. He made his debut for FC Metalist in the match against FC Illichivets Mariupol on 14 April 2012 in Ukrainian Premier League.

He moved to FC Hoverla Uzhhorod in early 2015. Hoverla Uzhhorod manager Vyacheslav Hroznyi declared on Ukrainian Channel 1 TV, that Artem had already signed a contract with Fenerbahçe and Uzhhorod already know that before the 6 months transfer. Radchenko denied that information.

In summer 2015, Radchenko joined team HNK Hajduk of Split, Croatia. At 6.30am on 7 August 2016, Radchenko was involved in a car accident, receiving only minor injuries and was released from hospital hours later. It was later discovered that Radchenko was over the legal blood alcohol limit and Hajduk announced that it would respond to the incident in the strongest possible manner. On 11 August 2016, it was announced that Artem Radchenko was released from Hajduk Split with immediate effect. Radchenko made just six appearances for 158 minutes in a Hajduk kit over 14 months at the club.

Radchenko signed for Belarusian Premier League side FC Dnepr Mogilev, making his debut in a 1–0 win over Gomel in April 2018, his first competitive match since 17 April 2016.

In January 2023 he moved to Dainava.

=== FK Transinvest ===
In summer 2024 he returned to Lithuania and made an agreement with "Transinvest". On 5 July he made his debut at A Lyga match against FA Šiauliai.
