= Hrvoje Relota =

Croatian footballer

Personal information
- Date of birth: 19 January 1996 (age 30)
- Place of birth: Split, Croatia
- Height: 1.70 m (5 ft 7 in)
- Positions: Full back; winger

Team information
- Current team: Uskok

Youth career
- 2010–2013: Val Kaštel Stari
- 2014–2015: RNK Split

Senior career*
Years	Team	Apps	(Gls)
2013	Val Kaštel Stari	7	(0)
2015–2016	Hajduk Split	1	(0)
2015–2020	Hajduk Split II	74	(3)
2017	→ Dugopolje (loan)	9	(0)
2020–2022	Solin	41	(1)
2022-2023	Uskok	26	(0)
2023-	Jadran KS	48	(15)
- * Club domestic league appearances and goals as of 18 January 2026 (UTC)

Hrvoje Relota (born 19 January 1996) is a Croatian football defender, currently playing for NK Uskok.

Coming from Kaštela, Relota went through the ranks of Val Kaštel Stari, considered to be one of the best young sportsmen of his town in 2012. In 2013, he debuted and played several games for his club's senior team. At the beginning of 2014, he joined the RNK Split academy, winning the U19 2014/15 national championship with them. He was never a part of a youth international team (as of May 2016), but was a member of an unofficial U-19 selection of players from Dalmatia that played a friendly with HNK Hajduk Split's U19 team in February 2015.

In the summer of 2015, however, he joined HNK Hajduk Split, becoming a part of the B team. He was called up to the senior team that was missing 14 players for the last game of the 2015/16 season, along with Ardian Ismajli and Josip Maganjić. He made his first team debut on May 14, 2016, in a 3–2 away win against NK Zagreb, playing the entire game and clearing a goal-bound shot by Alen Jurilj from the line in the 72nd minute.
