= NK Omladinac Vranjic =

Croatian football club

- Full name: Nogometni Klub Omladinac Vranjic
- Founded: 1914; 111 years ago
- Ground: SC Kava
- Capacity: 5,000
- Chairman: Mario Jurić
- Manager: Valentino Roglić
- League: 1.ŽNL Split-Dalmatia County
- 2022–23: 6th
Home colours

NK Omladinac is a football club from Vranjic, near Split, Croatia. The club was founded in 1914 with the name Uskok. In 1937, the name was changed to Omladinac. It plays in First league of Split-Dalmatia County.

The supporters call themselves "Plave murine".
