= Marko Bencun =

Croatian footballer (born 1992)

Personal information
- Date of birth: 9 November 1992 (age 34)
- Place of birth: Metković, Croatia
- Height: 1.84 m (6 ft 0 in)
- Position: Forward

Team information
- Current team: Čapljina (manager)

Youth career
- Međugorje
- 2006–2008: Neretva
- 2008–2011: Hajduk Split

Senior career*
Years	Team	Apps	(Gls)
2011–2017	Hajduk Split	50	(9)
2011	→ Primorac 1929 (loan)	16	(12)
2012	→ Dugopolje (loan)	6	(4)
2013	→ Primorac 1929 (loan)	6	(5)
2015	→ Brașov (loan)	13	(2)
2017	Inter Zaprešić	8	(0)
2018–2020	Zrinjski Mostar	26	(2)
2020	Neretva	3	(0)
Total		128	(34)

International career
2009	Bosnia and Herzegovina U19	7	(6)
2014	Croatia U21	1	(0)

Managerial career
- 2024–: Čapljina
- * Club domestic league appearances and goals

Marko Bencun (born 9 November 1992) is a Croatian former professional footballer who played as a forward.

== Club career ==
Having passed through the ranks of the Hajduk Split youth academy, Bencun was loaned in the summer of 2011 to the Treća HNL Jug side NK Primorac 1929 and after a great half-season in Primorac, he was subsequently recalled to the Hajduk first team by coach Krasimir Balakov in January 2012. Because of a very big competition in the Hajduk's front line, with the likes of Ante Vukušić and Ivan Vuković who had great season, Bencun was sent on half-year loan again in February, this time to NK Dugopolje in Druga HNL. In Dugopolje, he had a great start where he scored 4 times in only six appearances, but in April he suffered serious ligaments injury in training, which kept him out for the rest of the season. He had a very good first part of the 2012–2013 season at Hajduk, scoring 9 times in 14 appearances, but again, after a row with Hajduk coach, Stanko Poklepović, Bencun was loaned in February 2013 to its feeder club, NK Primorac 1929 again. He was again very prolific, scored 5 goals in 6 matches, and returned to Hajduk after the season ended.

Since Stanko Poklepović was no longer coach, he had made himself a starter again under coach Igor Tudor, and the season 2013-14 was his best. He scored 12 times in the 1. HNL, including a brace in "Eternal derby" against Dinamo Zagreb. After the season ended, there were multiple enquiries from European clubs, including FC Midtjylland, AS Saint-Ettiene and Sochaux, but Hajduk refused to let him go for less than 2.5 million euros.

Eventually, he was loaned to FC Brasov for €500,000 with an option to purchase him at the end of the season for a further 2,2 million Euro. In Brasov, he scored 5 goals in 11 championship matches and 2 goals in the cup competition, but again, because of his problematic behaviour, he got in an argument with teammates and returned to Hajduk in January, 2015.

In 1. HNL, he scored 8 times in 10 matches, and again attracted interest from various football clubs. Hajduk Split set a price of €2,000,000 for young forward.

=== Later career ===
Bencun had four knee surgeries up to the age of 24. So in February 2020, 27-year old Bencun returned to his former youth club NK Neretva, after injuries didn't allow him to play on a higher level.

In addition to playing for Neretva, Bencun was also announced as the new head of the football school of HNK Brotnjo Čitluk (Škola nogometa HNK Brotnjo in Croatian) on 1 July 2020 at the age of only 27.

However, already at the end of the month, on 27 July 2020, it was confirmed that he had left Brotnjo again and instead had been hired as head of the football school of his former youth club NK Međugorje. Bencun revealed that he believed himself to be too inexperienced to lead more experienced coaches, with the smaller number of children in NK Međugorje's school being more manageable for his capabilities at the moment.

== Honours ==
Hajduk Split

- Croatian Cup: 2012–13

Zrinjski Mostar

- Bosnian Premier League: 2017–18
