= Ivan Prskalo =

Bosnian Croat footballer (born 1995)

Personal information
- Full name: Ivan Prskalo
- Date of birth: 29 March 1995 (age 31)
- Place of birth: Mostar, Bosnia and Herzegovina
- Height: 1.84 m (6 ft 1/2 in)
- Positions: Forward; winger

Team information
- Current team: Brotnjo Čitluk
- Number: 21

Youth career
- 2005–2010: NK Međugorje
- 2010–2012: Dinamo Zagreb
- 2012–2014: Hajduk Split

Senior career*
| Years | Team | Apps | (Gls) |
| 2014–2016 | Hajduk Split B | 33 | (14) |
| 2014–2016 | Hajduk Split | 6 | (0) |
| 2015 | → Sesvete (loan) | 19 | (12) |
| 2016 | Cibalia | 4 | (0) |
| 2016–2017 | Gorica | 21 | (5) |
| 2017 | NK Pajde Möhlin | 11 | (5) |
| 2018 | Imotski | 8 | (7) |
| 2018–2019 | Solin | 5 | (0) |
| 2019 | GOŠK Gabela | 5 | (0) |
| 2019 | Njarðvík | 12 | (5) |
| 2020 | Neretvanac Opuzen | 3 | (0) |
| 2020 | Njarðvík | 12 | (6) |
| 2020–2021 | Neretva Metković | 22 | (5) |
| 2021–2022 | Reynir Sandgerði | 28 | (12) |
| 2022– | Brotnjo Čitluk | 14 | (14) |

International career
| 2013 | Bosnia and Herzegovina U-21 | 2 | (0) |
- * Club domestic league appearances and goals as of 10 March 2024

Ivan Prskalo (born 29 March 1995) is a Bosnian Croat footballer who plays as a forward for Brotnjo Čitluk.

== Club career ==
A native of Čitluk, and the son of the former Prva HNL player Marijo Prskalo, Prskalo started his career at the local lower-tier side NK Međugorje, before moving to GNK Dinamo Zagreb, aged 14. He remained at the club until the summer of 2012, when he moved to the academy of their rivals HNK Hajduk Split, the team which he supports. He established himself as a first-team regular for the U19 side, becoming the top scorer of the Prva HNL Academy U19 league for the 2013/14 season with 17 goals.

During the 2014–15 season he established himself as a regular in Hajduk's Treća HNL reserve team, before making his Prva HNL debut, coming in the 82. minute of the 2–1 home win against NK Osijek for Dejan Mezga.

Sent on loan to the Druga HNL side NK Sesvete he made a strong start to the season with 7 goals scored in the first 9 games. He was called back to Hajduk during the winter preparations of 2016, but he played only 2 games during the spring part of the season. On 7 June 2016, his contract with Hajduk was terminated and after a trial period he joined HNK Cibalia.
