= 2012–13 HNK Hajduk Split season =

Hajduk Split
2012–13 season
- Chairman: Hrvoje Maleš (until 18 July 2012); Marin Brbić (from 18 July 2012)
- Manager: Mišo Krstičević (until 29 April 2013); Igor Tudor (from 29 April 2013)
- Prva HNL: 4th
- Croatian Cup: Winners
- Europa League: Third qualifying round
- Top goalscorer: League: Caktaš, Vuković (9); All: Ivan Vuković (11)
- Highest home attendance: 35,000 vs Inter Milan (2 August 2012)
- Lowest home attendance: 3,000 (Two matches)
- Average home league attendance: 9,441
Home colours	Away colours

The 2012–13 season was the 102nd season in Hajduk Split's history and their twenty-second in the Prva HNL. Their 2nd-place finish in the 2011–12 season means it was their 22nd successive season playing in the Prva HNL.

== First-team squad ==
As of 26 May 2013

Note: Flags indicate national team as defined under FIFA eligibility rules; some limited exceptions apply. Players may hold more than one non-FIFA nationality.

No.	Pos.	Nation	Player
1	GK	CRO	Goran Blažević
2	DF	CRO	Dino Mikanović
3	DF	CRO	Danijel Stojanović
4	DF	CRO	Antonio Milić
5	DF	CRO	Goran Milović
6	DF	BIH	Avdija Vršajević
7	MF	CRO	Franko Andrijašević
8	MF	CRO	Krešo Ljubičić
9	FW	CRO	Anton Maglica
11	MF	CRO	Mirko Oremuš (vice-captain)
12	GK	CRO	Lovre Kalinić
13	MF	CRO	Antonio Jakoliš
14	FW	CRO	Tonći Mujan
15	MF	CRO	Zoran Plazonić
16	FW	CRO	Ivan Jakov Džoni
17	DF	CRO	Goran Jozinović (3rd captain)
18	MF	CRO	Mijo Caktaš

No.	Pos.	Nation	Player
19	DF	CRO	Josip Elez
20	MF	CRO	Filip Ozobić (on loan from Spartak Moscow)
21	MF	CRO	Miro Kovačić
22	DF	CRO	Mario Maloča (captain)
23	DF	CRO	Zoran Nižić
24	FW	MNE	Ivan Vuković
25	GK	CRO	Pavao Vugdelija
26	FW	CRO	Ivo Caput
27	DF	CRO	Matej Jonjić
28	DF	POR	Ruben Lima
29	MF	CRO	Ivo-Valentino Tomaš
30	MF	CRO	Josip Bašić
31	MF	BIH	Tino-Sven Sušić
32	MF	CRO	Mario Pašalić
33	FW	CRO	Tomislav Kiš
35	DF	CRO	Luka Lučić
77	FW	CIV	Jean Evrard Kouassi

== Competitions ==
=== Overall record ===
Performance by competition
Competition	Starting round	Final position/round	First match	Last match
Prva HNL	—N/a	4th	22 July 2012	26 May 2013
Croatian Football Cup	First round	Winners	26 September 2012	22 May 2013
UEFA Europa League	Second qualifying round	Third qualifying round	19 July 2012	9 August 2012

Statistics by competition
Competition	Pld	W	D	L	GF	GA	GD	Win%
Prva HNL	33	14	10	9	45	31	+14	42.42
Croatian Football Cup	8	5	3	0	17	8	+9	62.50
UEFA Europa League	4	2	0	2	4	4	+0	50.00
Total	45	21	13	11	66	43	+23	46.67

=== Prva HNL ===
==== League table ====
Pos	Team	Pld	W	D	L	GF	GA	GD	Pts	Qualification or relegation
2	Lokomotiva	33	16	9	8	54	38	+16	57	Qualification to Europa League second qualifying round (Note: Hajduk Split qualify for 2013–14 Europa League Second qualifying round as winners of 2012–13 Croatian Cup.)
3	Rijeka	33	15	8	10	46	42	+4	53	Qualification to Europa League second qualifying round
4	Hajduk Split	33	14	10	9	45	31	+14	52	Qualification to Europa League second qualifying round
5	RNK Split	33	15	7	11	49	37	+12	52	
6	Istra 1961	33	11	11	11	35	32	+3	44	

Source: Sportnet.hr
Rules for classification: 1) points; 2) goal difference; 3) number of goals scored.
For deciding champions, qualification to UEFA Europa League and relegation: 1st points; 2nd head-to-head points; 3rd head-to-head goal difference; 4th head-to-head away goals scored

==== Results summary ====
Overall								Home						Away					
Pld	W	D	L	GF	GA	GD	Pts	W	D	L	GF	GA	GD	W	D	L	GF	GA	GD
33	14	10	9	45	31	+14	52	9	4	4	28	14	+14	5	6	5	17	17	0

Last updated: 26 May 2013.
Source: Sportnet.hr

==== Results by round ====
Round	1	2	3	4	5	6	7	8	9	10	11	12	13	14	15	16	17	18	19	20	21	22	23	24	25	26	27	28	29	30	31	32	33
Ground	A	H	A	H	A	H	A	A	H	A	H	H	A	H	A	H	A	H	H	A	H	A	H	A	H	A	H	A	H	A	H	H	A
Result	D	W	W	W	L	D	L	D	W	L	W	L	W	W	W	D	D	D	W	W	L	W	L	D	W	D	W	D	L	L	D	W	L
Position	6	4	1	1	4	3	4	4	3	5	3	6	3	2	2	2	3	3	2	2	2	2	2	3	2	3	2	3	4	5	5	3	4

Source: Competitive matches
A = Away; H = Home; W = Win; D = Draw; L = Loss

==== Results by opponent ====
Team	Results			Points
Team	1	2	3	Points
Cibalia	4–0	2–0	2–1	9
Dinamo Zagreb	1–3	1–2	1–3	0
Inter Zaprešić	1–1	1–0	1–1	5
Istra 1961	0–0	0–1	1–2	1
Lokomotiva	0–2	0–0	0–0	2
Osijek	1–1	0–0	1–0	5
Rijeka	0–1	1–1	1–2	1
Slaven Belupo	3–1	2–0	1–1	6
RNK Split	1–0	1–0	1–2	6
Zadar	4–2	3–0	1–1	7
NK Zagreb	5–1	1–0	3–2	9

Source: 2012–13 Croatian First Football League article

== Matches ==
=== Friendlies ===
==== Pre-season ====
Match	Date	Venue	Opponent	Score	Hajduk Scorers	Report
1	27 Jun	N (Austria)	Selection of Croats (Austria)	13 – 0	Caktaš, Milović, Tomaš (2), Ozobić, Kiš (4), Sušić, Kukoč, Jurina (2)	hajduk.hr
2	1 Jul	N (Austria)	Alania Vladikavkaz (Russia)	1 – 2	Caktaš	hajduk.hr
3	3 Jul	A (Austria)	Freilassing (Austria)	10 – 0	Trebotić, Andrijašević (2), Kiš (2), Kukoč (2), Vukušić, Milić, Bencun	hajduk.hr
4	8 Jul	H	Rudar Prijedor (Bosnia and Herzegovina)	5 – 1	Caktaš, Sušić, Ozobić, Andrijašević, Kiš	hajduk.hr
5	11 Jul	N (Bosnia and Herzegovina)	Rudar Prijedor (Bosnia and Herzegovina)	1 – 1	Vuković	hajduk.hr
6	12 Jul	A	Imotski	4 – 0	Vukušić, Maglica (2), Kukoč	hajduk.hr

==== On-season ====
Match	Date	Venue	Opponent	Score	Hajduk Scorers	Report
1	4 Sep	A	Val Kaštel Stari	0 – 1		hajduk.hr
2	19 Mar	N	Dolina Neretve	6 – 3	Andrijašević (2), Patinho, Kiš, Cássio, Džoni	hajduk.hr
3	27 May	A	Požega	5 – 1	Kovačić, Plazonić (2), Pašalić (2)	hajduk.hr

==== Mid-season ====
Match	Date	Venue	Opponent	Score	Attendance	Hajduk Scorers	Report
1	16 Jan	A (Bosnia and Herzegovina)	Brotnjo (Bosnia and Herzegovina)	6 – 0	1,500	Maglica, Caput (3), Andrijašević, Kouassi (2)	Sportnet.hr
2	21 Jan	N (Turkey)	Dynamo Dresden (Germany)	1 – 0	100	Vuković	Sportnet.hr
3	22 Jan	N (Turkey)	Wolfsburg II (Germany)	1 – 1	100	Ozobić	Sportnet.hr
4	24 Jan	N (Turkey)	WAC (Austria)	1 – 3	100	Kouassi	Sportnet.hr
5	27 Jan	N (Turkey)	Dinamo Minsk (Belarus)	0 – 0	30		Sportnet.hr
6	28 Jan	N (Turkey)	Horn (Austria)	2 – 3	30	Maglica, Tomaš	Sportnet.hr
7	30 Jan	N (Turkey)	Red Bull Salzburg (Austria)	2 – 1	70	Vuković, Jonjić	Sportnet.hr
8	3 Feb	N (Bosnia and Herzegovina)	Zrinjski (Bosnia and Herzegovina)	1 – 1 (5 – 4 p)	2,500	Vuković	Sportnet.hr
9	4 Feb	N (Bosnia and Herzegovina)	Budućnost Podgorica (Montenegro)	3 – 0	1,500	Sušić, Kouassi, Vuković	Sportnet.hr
10	9 Feb	H	Olimpija Ljubljana (Slovenia)	4 – 1	6,000	Maglica (2), Vuković, Andrijašević	Sportnet.hr

=== Prva HNL ===
22 July 2012 1	Istra 1961	0–0	Hajduk Split	Pula
21:00 CEST (UTC+02:00)		Report		Stadium: Stadion Aldo Drosina; Attendance: 6,000; Referee: Ivan Bebek (Rijeka)

29 July 2012 2	Hajduk Split	1–0	RNK Split	Split
21:00 CEST (UTC+02:00)	Andrijašević 15'; Jozinović (yellow card) 25'; Ozobić (yellow card) 30'	Report	Belle (yellow card) 34'; Erceg (yellow card) 40'; Pehar (yellow card) 44'; Jelić (yellow card) 90+2'	Stadium: Stadion Poljud; Attendance: 12,000; Referee: Goran Gabrilo (Split)

5 August 2012 3	Zadar	2–4	Hajduk Split	Zadar
19:00 CEST (UTC+02:00)	Jolić 15'; Ćurjurić 82'	Report	Vukušić 34'; Stojanović (yellow card) 50'; Caktaš 65'; Andrijašević 67'; Maglica (yellow card) 72'; I. Vuković 89'	Stadium: Stadion Stanovi; Attendance: 4,000; Referee: Marijo Strahonja (Zagreb)

12 August 2012 4	Hajduk Split	5–1	NK Zagreb	Split
19:00 CEST (UTC+02:00)	Vukušić 11', 66' (yellow card) 26'; Caktaš 28', 60'; Andrijašević (yellow card) 53'; Maglica 78'	Report	Vojtuš 15'; Barišić (yellow card) 27'; Zadro (yellow card) 41'; Štiglec (yellow card) 44'; Mitrović (yellow card) 54'; Kolinger (yellow card) 77'	Stadium: Stadion Poljud; Attendance: 17,000; Referee: Damir Batinić (Osijek)

19 August 2012 5	Lokomotiva	2–0	Hajduk Split	Zagreb
21:00 CEST (UTC+02:00)	Mesarić (yellow card) 28'; Kramarić 42'; Boras 53'; Pejić (yellow card) 59'; Barbarić (yellow card) 62'	Report	Blažević (yellow card) 54'; Milović (yellow card) 57'; Jozinović (yellow card) 64'; A. Milić (yellow card) 78'	Stadium: Stadion Maksimir; Attendance: 3,000; Referee: Zlatko Šimčić (Koprivnica)

26 August 2012 6	Hajduk Split	1–1	Osijek	Split
21:00 CEST (UTC+02:00)	Caktaš 15'; A. Milić (yellow card) 90+2'	Report	J. Mišić (yellow card) 30'; Pongračić (yellow card) 76'; Lešković 88'; Glavaš (yellow card) 90+2'	Stadium: Stadion Poljud; Attendance: 10,000; Referee: Dalibor Mlakar (Zagreb)

1 September 2012 7	Rijeka	1–0	Hajduk Split	Rijeka
21:00 CEST (UTC+02:00)	Kreilach 81' (pen.); Čaval (yellow card) 86'; Mujanović (yellow card) 43' (yellow-red card) 90+1'	Report	Vršajević (yellow card) 31'; Maloča (yellow card) 52'; Milović (yellow card) 60'; Jonjić (yellow card) 74'; Blažević (yellow card) 80'	Stadium: Stadion Kantrida; Attendance: 6,000; Referee: Igor Križarić (Čakovec)

15 September 2012 8	Inter Zaprešić	1–1	Hajduk Split	Zaprešić
18:00 CEST (UTC+02:00)	Mlinar (yellow card) 50'; Čeliković (yellow card) 58'; Oršić 73'; Milardović (yellow card) 85'; Šarić (penalty missed) 90+2'	Report	Andrijašević (yellow card) 17'; I. Vuković (yellow card) 20'; A. Milić 25'	Stadium: Stadion ŠRC Zaprešić; Attendance: 3,000; Referee: Ivan Bebek (Rijeka)

23 September 2012 9	Hajduk Split	3–1	Slaven Belupo	Split
19:00 CEST (UTC+02:00)	Andrijašević 44', 45' (yellow card) 90'; I. Vuković 74'	Report	Maras (yellow card) 48'; Kokalović (yellow card) 74'; Bušić 85'	Stadium: Stadion Poljud; Attendance: 10,000; Referee: Damir Batinić (Osijek)

29 September 2012 10	Dinamo Zagreb	3–1	Hajduk Split	Zagreb
18:00 CEST (UTC+02:00)	Sammir 37', 78' (pen.) (yellow card) 38'; Čop 44'	Report	Caktaš 1'; Stojanović (yellow card) 2'; Oremuš (yellow card) 74'	Stadium: Stadion Maksimir; Attendance: 10,000; Referee: Vlado Svilokos (Sisak)

5 October 2012 11	Hajduk Split	4–0	Cibalia	Split
19:00 CEST (UTC+02:00)	I. Vuković 23' (pen.), 50' (pen.); Radošević (yellow card) 42'; Caktaš 73'; A. Milić 86'	Report	Muženjak (yellow card) 44'; Terzić (yellow card) 49'	Stadium: Stadion Poljud; Attendance: 6,000; Referee: Igor Pristovnik (Zagreb)

21 October 2012 12	Hajduk Split	0–1	Istra 1961	Split
19:00 CEST (UTC+02:00)	Vršajević (yellow card) 79'; Maglica (yellow card) 82'; Andrijašević (yellow card) 90+7'; Radošević (yellow card) 90+8'	Report	Blagojević (yellow card) 12'; Roce (yellow card) 55' (goal) 80'; Prskalo (yellow card) 90+2'; A. Pamić (yellow card) 90+8'	Stadium: Stadion Poljud; Attendance: 22,000; Referee: Tihomir Pejin (Donji Miholjac)

28 October 2012 13	RNK Split	0–1	Hajduk Split	Split
19:00 CET (UTC+01:00)	Pehar (yellow card) 65'; A. Vuković (yellow card) 90'	Report	Stojanović (yellow card) 48'; Vršajević 61'; Oremuš (yellow card) 76'	Stadium: Stadion Park Mladeži; Attendance: 4,000; Referee: Goran Gabrilo (Split)

3 November 2012 14	Hajduk Split	3–0	Zadar	Split
19:00 CET (UTC+01:00)	Maloča (yellow card) 2'; Oremuš (yellow card) 27'; I. Vuković 63'; Bencun 74'; Kiš 79'	Report		Stadium: Stadion Poljud; Attendance: 4,500; Referee: Marin Vidulin (Kanfanar)

9 November 2012 15	NK Zagreb	0–1	Hajduk Split	Zagreb
17:00 CET (UTC+01:00)	Mitrović (yellow card) 88'	Report	Vršajević (yellow card) 39'; Maglica (yellow card) 44'; Andrijašević 49'	Stadium: Stadion Kranjčevićeva; Attendance: 4,000; Referee: Mario Zebec (Cestica)

17 November 2012 16	Hajduk Split	0–0	Lokomotiva	Split
19:00 CET (UTC+01:00)	Kiš (yellow card) 35'	Report	Maleš (yellow card) 28'; Samateh (yellow card) 49'	Stadium: Stadion Poljud; Attendance: 10,000; Referee: Domagoj Vučkov (Rijeka)

24 November 2012 17	Osijek	0–0	Hajduk Split	Osijek
15:00 CET (UTC+01:00)	Kvržić (yellow card) 44'; Perošević (yellow card) 50'	Report	A. Milić (yellow card) 27'; Maglica (yellow card) 69'	Stadium: Stadion Gradski vrt Attendance: 5,000; Referee: Ivan Bebek (Rijeka)

2 December 2012 18	Hajduk Split	1–1	Rijeka	Split
19:00 CET (UTC+01:00)	Radošević (yellow card) 45'; Andrijašević (yellow card) 50'; Maglica 51' (red card) 90+5'	Report	Močinić (yellow card) 33'; Benko 45+1'; Cesarec (yellow card) 49'; Mutombo (yellow card) 90+4'; Knežević (red card) 90+5'	Stadium: Stadion Poljud; Attendance: 7,000; Referee: Domagoj Ljubičić (Osijek)

7 December 2012 19	Hajduk Split	1–0	Inter Zaprešić	Split
18:00 CET (UTC+01:00)	A. Milić 33'	Report	Vujčić (yellow card) 68'; Šćrbec (yellow card) 79'	Stadium: Stadion Poljud; Attendance: 3,000; Referee: Marin Vidulin (Kanfanar)

16 February 2013 20	Slaven Belupo	0–2	Hajduk Split	Koprivnica
18:00 CET (UTC+01:00)	Pranjić (yellow card) 38'; Bubnjić (red card) 48'	Report	Jonjić 16' (yellow card) 71'; Maglica (yellow card) 36'; I. Vuković 82'; Plazonić (yellow card) 86'	Stadium: Gradski stadion Attendance: 2,500; Referee: Domagoj Vučkov (Rijeka)

27 February 2013 21	Hajduk Split	1–2	Dinamo Zagreb	Split
19:00 CET (UTC+01:00)	Jozinović 42' (yellow card) 42'; Stojanović (yellow card) 69'; Andrijašević (yellow card) 74'; TS. Sušić (yellow card) 81'	Report	Krstanović 11' (yellow card) 13'; Vrsaljko (yellow card) 18'; Jedvaj (yellow card) 25'; Brozović (yellow card) 40' (yellow-red card) 65'; Ibáñez 43'; Marić (yellow card) 51'	Stadium: Stadion Poljud; Attendance: 25,000; Referee: Ivan Bebek (Rijeka)
Note: The match was originally scheduled on 24 February, but was postponed to 27 February 2013 due to the flooded pitch.

2 March 2013 22	Cibalia	0–2	Hajduk Split	Vinkovci
15:00 CET (UTC+01:00)	Župarić (yellow card) 35'; Miloš (yellow card) 55'	Report	Maglica 37', 51' (yellow card) 42'; Milić (yellow card) 62'; TS. Sušić (yellow card) 89'	Stadium: Stadion HNK Cibalia; Attendance: 5,500; Referee: Marijo Strahonja (Zagreb)

9 March 2013 23	Hajduk Split	1–2	Istra 1961	Split
18:00 CET (UTC+01:00)	Andrijašević (red card) 42'; Jozinović (yellow card) 60'; Blažević (yellow card) 64'; Vršajević (yellow card) 65'; I. Vuković 68' (pen.); Nižić (yellow card) 88'	Report	H. Milić 31'; Woon (yellow card) 45+3' (yellow-red card) 47'; M. Sušić (yellow card) 61'; Horvat (yellow card) 79'; Budicin 81'; Hadžić (yellow card) 90+1'	Stadium: Stadion Poljud; Attendance: 6,000; Referee: Damir Batinić (Osijek)

17 March 2013 24	Zadar	1–1	Hajduk Split	Zadar
18:00 CET (UTC+01:00)	Banović 1'; Sarić (yellow card) 72'; Surać (yellow card) 83'; Perica (yellow card) 89'	Report	Caktaš 31'; Rúben Lima (yellow card) 45+1'; Stojanović (yellow card) 82'	Stadium: Stadion Stanovi; Attendance: 4,000; Referee: Fran Jović (Zagreb)

30 March 2013 25	Hajduk Split	3–2	NK Zagreb	Split
19:00 CET (UTC+01:00)	Maloča 6' (pen.); Caktaš 12' (yellow card) 70'; I. Vuković 68'; Maglica (yellow card) 78'; Plazonić (yellow card) 86'	Report	Abdurahimi (yellow card) 26'; Šovšić 58' (pen.); Jurendić 67'	Stadium: Stadion Poljud; Attendance: 5,000; Referee: Marko Matoc (Zaprešić)

7 April 2013 26	Inter Zaprešić	1–1	Hajduk Split	Zaprešić
19:00 CEST (UTC+02:00)	Šarić (yellow card) 60'; Budimir (yellow card) 71' (goal) 87' (pen.); Pokrivač (yellow card) 80'; Hajradinović (yellow card) 90+1'	Report	Andrijašević 23'; Oremuš (yellow card) 59'; Jozinović (yellow card) 82'; Vršajević (yellow card) 86'	Stadium: Stadion ŠRC Zaprešić; Attendance: 5,000; Referee: Dalibor Mlakar (Zagreb)

13 April 2013 27	Hajduk Split	2–1	Cibalia	Split
15:00 CEST (UTC+02:00)	Caktaš 27' (yellow card) 71'; Stojanović (yellow card) 41'; Maloča (yellow card) 58'; I. Vuković 79'; Kiš (yellow card) 81'	Report	Bartolović 39'; P. Mišić (yellow card) 46' (yellow-red card) 72'; Matković (yellow card) 69'; Muženjak (yellow card) 87'	Stadium: Stadion Poljud; Attendance: 5,000; Referee: Fran Jović (Zagreb)

21 April 2013 28	Slaven Belupo	1–1	Hajduk Split	Koprivnica
19:00 CEST (UTC+02:00)	Delić 24'; Gregurina (yellow card) 77'; Glavica (yellow card) 86'; Bubnjić (yellow card) 87'	Report	Kouassi 47'; Jakoliš (yellow card) 53'	Stadium: Gradski stadion Attendance: 2,500; Referee: Domagoj Ljubičić (Osijek)

28 April 2013 29	Hajduk Split	1–2	Rijeka	Split
19:00 CEST (UTC+02:00)	Oremuš (yellow card) 19'; Blažević (yellow card) 36'; TS. Sušić 53'	Report	Mujanović 21'; Benko 36'; Neretljak (yellow card) 57'; Brezovec (yellow card) 61'; Škarabot (yellow card) 74'	Stadium: Stadion Poljud; Attendance: 10,000; Referee: Tihomir Pejin (Donji Miholjac)

4 May 2013 30	RNK Split	2–1	Hajduk Split	Split
19:00 CEST (UTC+02:00)	Erceg 31', 33' (yellow card) 85'; Glavina (yellow card) 68' (yellow-red card) 80'; Bagarić (yellow card) 79'	Report	Kouassi 36'; Milović (yellow card) 78'; TS. Sušić (yellow card) 78'	Stadium: Stadion Park Mladeži; Attendance: 1,500; Referee: Igor Pristovnik (Zagreb)

12 May 2013 31	Hajduk Split	0–0	Lokomotiva	Split
19:00 CEST (UTC+02:00)	Kouassi (yellow card) 38'; Stojanović (yellow card) 57'; I. Vuković (penalty missed) 68'; Rúben Lima (yellow card) 70'; Vršajević (yellow card) 89'	Report	Barbarić (yellow card) 33'; Mrzljak (yellow card) 40'; Picak (yellow card) 67'; Maleš (yellow card) 75'	Stadium: Stadion Poljud; Attendance: 5,000; Referee: Danijel Trampus (Osijek)

17 May 2013 32	Hajduk Split	1–0	Osijek	Split
18:00 CEST (UTC+02:00)	Maglica 16'; Jozinović (yellow card) 69'	Report	J. Mišić (yellow card) 23'; Blatnjak (yellow card) 29'	Stadium: Stadion Poljud; Attendance: 3,000; Referee: Davor Grizelj (Vinkovci)

26 May 2013 33	Dinamo Zagreb	3–1	Hajduk Split	Zagreb
15:00 CEST (UTC+02:00)	Z. Pamić 6'; Halilović (yellow card) 22'; Rukavina 57'; Addy (yellow card) 66'; Ademi (yellow card) 84'; Brozović 90+2'	Report	Milović (yellow card) 18'; A. Milić (yellow card) 19'; Stojanović (yellow card) 24'; Z. Pamić 26' (o.g.); Lučić (yellow card) 39'; Caktaš (yellow card) 67'; Jonjić (yellow card) 86'	Stadium: Stadion Maksimir; Attendance: 5,988; Referee: Domagoj Vučkov (Rijeka)

Source: HRnogomet.com

=== Croatian Football Cup ===
26 September 2012 R1	Slunj	0–4	Hajduk Split	Slunj
15:30 CEST (UTC+02:00)		Report	Milović 27'; Kiš 29', 66'; Barić 35' (o.g.)	Stadium: Zubac; Attendance: 2,000; Referee: Marko Matoc (Zaprešić)

31 October 2012 R2	Hajduk Split	2–1	RNK Split	Split
17:00 CET (UTC+01:00)	Caktaš 45' (yellow card) 45'; TS. Sušić 63' (yellow card) 63'; Maloča (yellow card) 81'	Report	Vojnović (yellow card) 13'; Erceg (yellow card) 32'; Rebić 60' (yellow card) 81'	Stadium: Stadion Poljud; Attendance: 4,000; Referee: Duje Strukan (Split)

27 November 2012 QF	Zelina	1–1	Hajduk Split	Sveti Ivan Zelina
18:00 CET (UTC+01:00)	Fuček (yellow card) 52' (goal) 56'; Brlečić (yellow card) 65'; Kranjčec (yellow card) 87'	Report	Vršajević 29' (yellow card) 65'	Stadium: SRC Zelina; Attendance: 4,000; Referee: Andrej Burilo (Osijek)

12 December 2012 QF	Hajduk Split	2–0 (3–1 agg.)	Zelina	Split
17:00 CET (UTC+01:00)	A. Milić 14' (yellow card) 55'; Andrijašević 76'	Report	Brlečić (yellow card) 44'; Fuček (red card) 52'	Stadium: Stadion Poljud; Attendance: 3,000; Referee: Ivo Krečak (Šibenik)

10 April 2013 SF	Slaven Belupo	1–2	Hajduk Split	Koprivnica
17:00 CEST (UTC+01:00)	Bubnjić (yellow card) 19' (yellow-red card) 90'; Delić (yellow card) 42'; Purić (yellow card) 45+2'; Kokalović (yellow card) 67' (yellow-red card) 85'; Vugrinec 77'; Čanađija (yellow card) 81'	Report	Vršajević (yellow card) 9' (yellow-red card) 17'; Jozinović (yellow card) 17'; TS. Sušić 55'; Kouassi (yellow card) 78'; Stojanović 90+1'	Stadium: Gradski stadion Attendance: 2,500; Referee: Damir Batinić (Osijek)
Note: The match was originally scheduled on 3 April, but was postponed to 10 April 2013 due to the flooded pitch.

17 April 2013 SF	Hajduk Split	1–1 (3–2 agg.)	Slaven Belupo	Split
19:00 CEST (UTC+01:00)	TS. Sušić (yellow card) 62'; A. Milić 72'; Stojanović (yellow card) 90+1'	Report	Glavica 32'; Pranjić (yellow card) 80'	Stadium: Stadion Poljud; Attendance: 15,000; Referee: Igor Pristovnik (Zagreb)

8 May 2013 Final	Hajduk Split	2–1	Lokomotiva	Split
19:30 CEST (UTC+01:00)	Vršajević (yellow card) 62'; Maglica 65'; Kouassi 69'	Report	Antolić 53'; Peko (yellow card) 81'	Stadium: Stadion Poljud; Attendance: 20,000; Referee: Andrej Burilo (Osijek)

22 May 2013 Final	Lokomotiva	3–3 (4–5 agg.)	Hajduk Split	Zagreb
20:15 CEST (UTC+01:00)	Šitum 8'; Boras (yellow card) 27'; Puljić (yellow card) 40'; Kramarić 70'; Bručić 90+3'	Report	TS. Sušić (yellow card) 25' (goal) 50'; Jozinović (yellow card) 39'; Vuković 45' (yellow card) 45'; Milović (yellow card) 68'; Stojanović 72'; Caktaš (yellow card) 85'	Stadium: Stadion Maksimir; Attendance: 10,000; Referee: Ante Vučemilović-Šimunović (Osijek)

Source: HRnogomet.com

=== Europa League ===
==== Second qualifying round ====
19 July 2012 First leg	Hajduk Split (Croatia)	2–0	(Latvia) Skonto	Split, Croatia
20:30 CEST (UTC+02:00)	Vukušić 34' (yellow card) 62'; Radošević (yellow card) 38'; Trebotić (yellow card) 49' (goal) 58'; Jonjić (yellow card) 64'; Vršajević (yellow card) 76'	Report	Maksimenko (yellow card) 43'; Siņeļņikovs (yellow card) 60'	Stadium: Stadion Poljud; Attendance: 23,000; Referee: Anastassios Kakos (Greece)

26 July 2012 Second leg	Skonto (Latvia)	1–0 (1–2 agg.)	(Croatia) Hajduk Split	Riga, Latvia
17:45 EEST (UTC+03:00)	Maksimenko (yellow card) 26'; Šabala (yellow card) 34'; Kukanos (yellow card) 38'; Siņeļņikovs 90+3'; Rode (yellow card) 90+6'	Report	Maglica (yellow card) 23'; Maloča (yellow card) 49'	Stadium: Skonto Stadium; Attendance: 3,100; Referee: Libor Kovarík (Czech Republic)

==== Third qualifying round ====
2 August 2012 First leg	Hajduk Split (Croatia)	0–3	(Italy) Inter Milan	Split, Croatia
20:45 CEST (UTC+02:00)	Maloča (yellow card) 18'; Radošević (yellow card) 90'	Report	Sneijder 18'; Nagatomo 44'; Coutinho 73'; Silvestre (yellow card) 90+2'	Stadium: Stadion Poljud; Attendance: 35,000; Referee: Hüseyin Göçek (Turkey)

9 August 2012 Second leg	Inter Milan (Italy)	0–2 (3–2 agg.)	(Croatia) Hajduk Split	Milan, Italy
20:45 CEST (UTC+02:00)	Samuel (yellow card) 6'	Report	Vukušić 23' (pen.); Radošević (yellow card) 55'; I. Vuković 58' (yellow card) 58'; Vršajević (yellow card) 62'	Stadium: San Siro; Attendance: 44,154; Referee: Clément Turpin (France)

Source: uefa.com

== Player seasonal records ==
Competitive matches only. Updated to games played 26 May 2013.

=== Top scorers ===
Rank	Name	League	Europe	Cup	Total
1	(Croatia) Mijo Caktaš	9	–	1	10
1	(Montenegro) Ivan Vuković	8	1	1	10
3	(Croatia) Franko Andrijašević	6	–	1	7
4	(Croatia) Anton Maglica	5	–	1	6
5	(Croatia) Ante Vukušić	3	2	–	5
5	(Croatia) Antonio Milić	3	–	2	5
7	(Bosnia and Herzegovina) Tino-Sven Sušić	1	–	3	4
8	(Croatia) Tomislav Kiš	1	–	2	3
8	(Ivory Coast) Jean Evrard Kouassi	2	–	1	3
10	(Croatia) Goran Milović	1	–	1	2
10	(Croatia) Danijel Stojanović	–	–	2	2
10	(Bosnia and Herzegovina) Avdija Vršajević	1	–	1	2
13	(Croatia) Marko Bencun	1	–	–	1
13	(Croatia) Matej Jonjić	1	–	–	1
13	(Croatia) Goran Jozinović	1	–	–	1
13	(Croatia) Mario Maloča	1	–	–	1
13	(Croatia) Dinko Trebotić	–	1	–	1
	Own goals	1	–	1	2
	TOTALS	45	4	17	66

Source: Competitive matches

=== Disciplinary record ===
Includes all competitive matches. Players with 1 card or more included only.

Number	Position	Name	1. HNL (Note: Two yellow cards resulting in a red are counted as a total of three cards – i.e. two yellow and one red card.)		Europa League		Croatian Cup		Total	
Number	Position	Name	Booked	Sent off (straight red)	Booked	Sent off (straight red)	Booked	Sent off (straight red)	Booked	Sent off (straight red)
1	GK	(Croatia) Goran Blažević	4	0	0	0	0	0	4	0
3	DF	(Croatia) Danijel Stojanović	7	0	0	0	1	0	8	0
4	DF	(Croatia) Antonio Milić	5	0	0	0	1	0	6	0
5	DF	(Croatia) Goran Milović	4	0	0	0	1	0	5	0
6	DF	(Bosnia and Herzegovina) Avdija Vršajević	5	0	2	0	4	1	11	1
7	MF	(Croatia) Franko Andrijašević	6	1	0	0	0	0	6	1
9	FW	(Croatia) Anton Maglica	7	1	1	0	0	0	8	1
11	MF	(Croatia) Mirko Oremuš	4	0	0	0	0	0	4	0
13	MF	(Croatia) Antonio Jakoliš	1	0	0	0	0	0	1	0
13	FW	(Croatia) Ante Vukušić	1	0	1	0	0	0	2	0
14	MF	(Croatia) Josip Radošević	3	0	3	0	0	0	6	0
15	MF	(Croatia) Zoran Plazonić	3	0	0	0	0	0	3	0
17	DF	(Croatia) Goran Jozinović	6	0	0	0	2	0	8	0
18	MF	(Croatia) Mijo Caktaš	3	0	0	0	2	0	5	0
20	MF	(Croatia) Filip Ozobić	1	0	0	0	0	0	1	0
22	DF	(Croatia) Mario Maloča	3	0	2	0	1	0	6	0
23	DF	(Croatia) Zoran Nižić	1	0	0	0	0	0	1	0
24	FW	(Montenegro) Ivan Vuković	1	0	1	0	1	0	3	0
27	DF	(Croatia) Matej Jonjić	3	0	1	0	0	0	4	0
28	DF	(Portugal) Ruben Lima	1	0	0	0	0	0	1	0
30	MF	(Croatia) Dinko Trebotić	0	0	1	0	0	0	1	0
31	MF	(Bosnia and Herzegovina) Tino-Sven Sušić	3	0	0	0	3	0	6	0
33	FW	(Croatia) Tomislav Kiš	2	0	0	0	0	0	2	0
35	DF	(Croatia) Luka Lučić	1	0	0	0	0	0	1	0
77	FW	(Ivory Coast) Jean Evrard Kouassi	0	0	0	0	1	0	1	0
		TOTALS	75	2	12	0	17	1	104	3

Sources: Prva-HNL.hr, UEFA.com

=== Appearances and goals ===
Number	Position	Player	Apps	Goals	Apps	Goals	Apps	Goals	Apps	Goals
Number	Position	Player	Total		1. HNL (Note: First number represents appearances in starting eleven, while the second number indicates a substitute appearance.)		Europa League		Croatian Cup	
1	GK	(Croatia) Goran Blažević	39	0	29+0	0	4+0	0	6+0	0
2	DF	(Croatia) Dino Mikanović	3	0	0+1	0	0+0	0	0+2	0
3	DF	(Croatia) Danijel Stojanović	29	2	17+2	0	1+1	0	4+4	2
4	DF	(Croatia) Antonio Milić	32	5	21+5	3	1+1	0	4+0	2
5	DF	(Croatia) Goran Milović	32	2	22+1	1	3+0	0	6+0	1
6	DF	(Bosnia and Herzegovina) Avdija Vršajević	34	2	25+0	1	4+0	0	5+0	1
7	MF	(Croatia) Franko Andrijašević	32	7	22+2	6	3+0	0	5+0	1
9	FW	(Croatia) Anton Maglica	24	6	12+4	5	1+1	0	4+2	1
11	MF	(Croatia) Mirko Oremuš	31	0	24+2	0	3+0	0	2+0	0
12	GK	(Croatia) Lovre Kalinić	4	0	3+0	0	0+0	0	1+0	0
13	MF	(Croatia) Antonio Jakoliš	8	0	1+5	0	0+0	0	0+2	0
13	FW	(Croatia) Ante Vukušić	9	5	5+0	3	4+0	2	0+0	0
14	MF	(Croatia) Tonći Mujan	1	0	0+1	0	0+0	0	0+0	0
14	MF	(Croatia) Josip Radošević	24	0	17+0	0	4+0	0	3+0	0
15	MF	(Croatia) Zoran Plazonić	9	0	4+3	0	0+0	0	1+1	0
16	FW	(Croatia) Ivan Jakov Džoni	2	0	0+2	0	0+0	0	0+0	0
16	MF	(Australia) Steven Luštica	11	0	1+6	0	1+1	0	1+1	0
17	DF	(Croatia) Goran Jozinović	30	1	17+4	1	3+0	0	6+0	0
18	MF	(Croatia) Mijo Caktaš	41	10	28+1	9	3+1	0	7+1	1
19	DF	(Croatia) Josip Elez	2	0	0+2	0	0+0	0	0+0	0
20	MF	(Croatia) Filip Ozobić	9	0	1+5	0	1+2	0	0+0	0
21	MF	(Croatia) Miro Kovačić	2	0	0+2	0	0+0	0	0+0	0
21	MF	(Croatia) Jure Obšivač	1	0	0+0	0	0+0	0	1+0	0
22	DF	(Croatia) Mario Maloča	32	1	22+0	1	4+0	0	6+0	0
23	DF	(Croatia) Zoran Nižić	7	0	5+1	0	0+0	0	1+0	0
24	FW	(Montenegro) Ivan Vuković	36	10	26+2	8	1+1	1	6+0	1
25	GK	(Croatia) Pavao Vugdelija	1	0	0+0	0	0+0	0	1+0	0
27	DF	(Croatia) Matej Jonjić	14	1	6+4	1	1+1	0	1+1	0
28	DF	(Portugal) Ruben Lima	27	0	17+4	0	0+0	0	6+0	0
29	MF	(Croatia) Ivo-Valentino Tomaš	8	0	2+2	0	0+2	0	1+1	0
30	MF	(Croatia) Josip Bašić	1	0	0+1	0	0+0	0	0+0	0
30	MF	(Croatia) Dinko Trebotić	2	1	0+1	0	1+0	1	0+0	0
31	MF	(Bosnia and Herzegovina) Tino-Sven Sušić	25	4	11+6	1	1+0	0	5+2	3
32	MF	(Croatia) Mario Pašalić	2	0	0+2	0	0+0	0	0+0	0
32	FW	(Croatia) Marko Bencun	11	1	4+7	1	0+0	0	0+0	0
33	FW	(Croatia) Tomislav Kiš	13	3	0+10	1	0+0	0	1+2	2
35	DF	(Croatia) Luka Lučić	1	0	1+0	0	0+0	0	0+0	0
44	DF	(Croatia) Tonći Kukoč	3	0	0+1	0	0+1	0	0+1	0
77	FW	(Ivory Coast) Jean Evrard Kouassi	16	3	9+3	2	0+0	0	4+0	1

Sources: Prva-HNL.hr, UEFA.com

== Transfers ==
=== In ===
Date	Position	Player	From	Fee
16 June 2012	MF	(Bosnia and Herzegovina) Tino-Sven Sušić	Standard Liège	Undisclosed
22 June 2012	DF	(Bosnia and Herzegovina) Avdija Vršajević	Čelik Zenica	Free
29 June 2012	FW	(Croatia) Anton Maglica	Osijek	300,000 €
5 July 2012	DF	(Croatia) Danijel Stojanović	Nacional	Free
13 August 2012	FW	(Bosnia and Herzegovina) Marin Jurina	Sloga Uskoplje	Free
1 January 2013	MF	(Croatia) Antonio Jakoliš	FC Dnipro	Free
1 January 2013	DF	(Croatia) Zoran Nižić	Brussels	Free
19 January 2013	FW	(Ivory Coast) Jean Evrard Kouassi	Moossou	Free

=== Out ===
Date	Position	Player	To	Fee
23 May 2012	DF	(Croatia) Mato Neretljak	Rijeka	Free
1 June 2012	MF	(Croatia) Mario Tičinović	Nordsjælland	135,000 €
10 June 2012	FW	(Croatia) Ivan Lendrić	Zulte Waregem	Free
21 June 2012	MF	(Croatia) Drago Gabrić	Rijeka	Free
27 June 2012	FW	(Croatia) Leopold Novak	Cibalia	Free
23 July 2012	FW	(Croatia) Ahmad Sharbini	Istra 1961	Free
25 July 2012	MF	(Croatia) Anas Sharbini	Ittihad	1,800,000 €
31 July 2012	FW	(Croatia) Ivan Pešić	Šibenik	Free
2 August 2012	MF	(Croatia) Srđan Andrić	Al-Wahda	Free
11 August 2012	FW	(Croatia) Hrvoje Tokić	Vinogradar	Free
21 August 2012	MF	(Croatia) Dinko Trebotić	Lokomotiva	Free
22 August 2012	DF	(Brazil) James Dens	Alki Larnaca	Free
26 August 2012	FW	(Croatia) Ante Vukušić	Pescara	3,800,000 €
31 August 2012	FW	(Croatia) Mario Sačer	Mura 05	Free
31 August 2012	FW	(Croatia) Tedi Surać	Primorac (BnM)	Free
22 January 2013	MF	(Croatia) Jure Obšivač	Istra 1961	Free
24 January 2013	MF	(Croatia) Josip Radošević	Napoli	3,000,000 €
25 January 2013	DF	(Croatia) Tonći Kukoč	Brescia	Free

=== Loans in ===
Date	Position	Player	From	Until
1 July 2012	MF	(Croatia) Filip Ozobić	Spartak Moscow	End of season
11 January 2013	MF	(Brazil) Cássio Gabriel	Fluminense	End of season
11 January 2013	MF	(Brazil) Lucas Patinho	Fluminense	End of season

=== Loans out ===
Date	Position	Player	To	Until
13 August 2012	GK	(Croatia) Ivan Banić	Primorac 1929	31 December 2012
13 August 2012	GK	(Croatia) Dante Stipica	Primorac 1929	31 December 2012
13 August 2012	DF	(Croatia) Petar Bašić	Primorac 1929	31 December 2012
13 August 2012	DF	(Croatia) Špiro Peričić	Primorac 1929	31 December 2012
13 August 2012	DF	(Croatia) Ante Vučković	Primorac 1929	31 December 2012
13 August 2012	MF	(Croatia) Duje Medak	Primorac 1929	31 December 2012
13 August 2012	MF	(Croatia) Zoran Plazonić	Primorac 1929	31 December 2012
13 August 2012	MF	(Croatia) Frane Vladislavić	Primorac 1929	31 December 2012
13 August 2012	FW	(Bosnia and Herzegovina) Marin Jurina	Primorac 1929	31 December 2012
13 August 2012	FW	(Croatia) Ivan Tomičić	Primorac 1929	31 December 2012
13 August 2012	FW	(Croatia) Kažimir Vukčević	Primorac 1929	31 December 2012
13 August 2012	FW	(Croatia) Duje Tadić	Junak Sinj	31 December 2012
20 August 2012	MF	(Croatia) Miro Kovačić	Omiš	31 December 2012
20 August 2012	MF	(Bosnia and Herzegovina) Stefan Barić	Primorac 1929	30 June 2013
31 August 2012	DF	(Croatia) Roko Španjić	Primorac 1929	31 December 2012
31 August 2012	DF	(Croatia) Marko Barišić	Primorac 1929	30 June 2013
31 August 2012	FW	(Croatia) Ivo Caput	GOŠK Dubrovnik	31 December 2012
23 January 2013	MF	(Australia) Steven Luštica	Brisbane Roar	30 June 2013
24 January 2013	FW	(Croatia) Ivan Tomičić	Solin	30 June 2013
15 February 2013	MF	(Croatia) Marko Bencun	Primorac 1929	30 June 2013

Sources: nogometni-magazin.com
