= 2013 Croatian Football Cup final =

- Event: 2012–13 Croatian Cup
Hajduk Split	Lokomotiva
5	4

First leg
Hajduk Split	Lokomotiva
2	1
- Date: 8 May 2013
- Venue: Stadion Poljud, Split
- Man of the Match: Jean Evrard Kouassi (Hajduk Split)
- Referee: Andrej Burilo (Osijek)
- Attendance: 20,000
- Weather: Clear; 21 °C (70 °F)

Second leg
Lokomotiva	Hajduk Split
3	3
- Date: 22 May 2013
- Venue: Stadion Maksimir, Zagreb
- Man of the Match: Tino-Sven Sušić (Hajduk Split)
- Referee: Ante Vučemilović (Osijek)
- Attendance: 12,000
- Weather: Clear; 19 °C (66 °F)

The 2013 Croatian Cup final was a two-legged affair played between Hajduk Split and Lokomotiva. The first leg was played in Split on 8 May 2013, while the second leg on 22 May 2013 in Zagreb.

Hajduk Split won the trophy with an aggregate result of 5–4.

== Road to the final ==
Hajduk Split		Round	Lokomotiva	
Opponent	Result		Opponent	Result
bye		Preliminary round	Slavija Pleternica	7–0
Slunj	4–0	First round	Segesta	4–2
RNK Split	2–1	Second round	Libertas	3–2
Zelina	1–1	Quarter-finals	GOŠK Dubrovnik	1–0
Zelina	2–0	Quarter-finals	GOŠK Dubrovnik	0–0
Slaven Belupo	2–1	Semi-finals	Cibalia	1–1
Slaven Belupo	1–1	Semi-finals	Cibalia	3–0

== First leg ==
8 May 2013
19:30

Hajduk Split	2–1	Lokomotiva
Maglica 65'; Kouassi 69'	Report (in Croatian)	Antolić 53'

Stadion Poljud, Split
Attendance: 20,000
Referee: Andrej Burilo (Osijek)

Hajduk Split	Lokomotiva

HAJDUK SPLIT:
GK	1	(Croatia) Goran Blažević
DF	5	(Croatia) Goran Milović
DF	6	(Bosnia and Herzegovina) Avdija Vršajević	(yellow card) 62'
DF	17	(Croatia) Goran Jozinović
DF	22	(Croatia) Mario Maloča (c)
DF	28	(Portugal) Ruben Lima
MF	7	(Croatia) Franko Andrijašević		(substituted off) 29'
MF	18	(Croatia) Mijo Caktaš
MF	31	(Belgium) Tino-Sven Sušić
FW	24	(Montenegro) Ivan Vuković		(substituted off) 65'
FW	77	(Ivory Coast) Jean Evrard Kouassi		(substituted off) 83'
Substitutes:
MF	13	(Croatia) Antonio Jakoliš		(substituted on) 29'
FW	9	(Croatia) Anton Maglica		(substituted on) 65'
DF	3	(Croatia) Danijel Stojanović		(substituted on) 83'
Manager:
(Croatia) Igor Tudor

LOKOMOTIVA:
GK	1	(Croatia) Dominik Picak
DF	4	(Croatia) Tomislav Barbarić
DF	5	(Croatia) Leonard Mesarić (c)
DF	11	(Croatia) Karlo Bručić
DF	14	(Croatia) Ivan Boras
MF	7	(Croatia) Domagoj Antolić
MF	8	(Croatia) Mate Maleš
MF	19	(Croatia) Marko Pjaca		(substituted off) 65'
MF	23	(Croatia) Dinko Trebotić		(substituted off) 71'
FW	18	(Croatia) Mario Šitum
FW	20	(Croatia) Andrej Kramarić		(substituted off) 90+1'
Substitutes:
MF	17	(Croatia) Ivan Peko	(yellow card) 81'	(substituted on) 65'
MF	15	(Cameroon) Mathias Chago		(substituted on) 71'
DF	3	(Croatia) Mario Musa		(substituted on) 90+1'
Manager:
(Croatia) Tomislav Ivković

Assistant referees:
Dalibor Conjar (Osijek)
Hrvoje Barišić (Osijek)
Fourth official:
Tihomir Pejin (Donji Miholjac)
Additional assistant referees:
Domagoj Ljubičić (Osijek)
Danijel Trampus (Osijek)

Match rules

- 90 minutes.
- Seven named substitutes.
- Maximum of three substitutions.

== Second leg ==
22 May 2013
20:15

Lokomotiva	3–3	Hajduk Split
Šitum 8'; Kramarić 70'; Bručić 90+3'	Report	Vuković 44'; Sušić 50'; Stojanović 72'

Stadion Maksimir, Zagreb
Attendance: 12,000
Referee: Ante Vučemilović (Osijek)

Lokomotiva	Hajduk Split

LOKOMOTIVA:
GK	1	(Croatia) Dominik Picak
DF	2	(Croatia) Filip Mrzljak		(substituted off) 52'
DF	4	(Croatia) Tomislav Barbarić
DF	6	(Croatia) Ante Puljić	(yellow card) 40'
DF	11	(Croatia) Karlo Bručić
DF	14	(Croatia) Ivan Boras	(yellow card) 27'
MF	7	(Croatia) Domagoj Antolić (c)
MF	8	(Croatia) Mate Maleš		(substituted off) 87'
MF	19	(Croatia) Marko Pjaca
FW	18	(Croatia) Mario Šitum		(substituted off) 82'
FW	20	(Croatia) Andrej Kramarić
Substitutes:
MF	17	(Croatia) Ivan Peko		(substituted on) 52'
DF	3	(Croatia) Mario Musa		(substituted on) 82'
MF	15	(Cameroon) Mathias Chago		(substituted on) 87'
Manager:
(Croatia) Tomislav Ivković

HAJDUK SPLIT:
GK	12	(Croatia) Lovre Kalinić
DF	5	(Croatia) Goran Milović
DF	6	(Bosnia and Herzegovina) Avdija Vršajević		(substituted off) 65'
DF	17	(Croatia) Goran Jozinović	(yellow card) 39'
DF	22	(Croatia) Mario Maloča (c)
DF	28	(Portugal) Ruben Lima
MF	18	(Croatia) Mijo Caktaš	(yellow card) 85'
MF	31	(Belgium) Tino-Sven Sušić	(yellow card) 25'
FW	9	(Croatia) Anton Maglica		(substituted off) 82'
FW	24	(Montenegro) Ivan Vuković	(yellow card) 45'	(substituted off) 51'
FW	77	(Ivory Coast) Jean Evrard Kouassi
Substitutes:
DF	3	(Croatia) Danijel Stojanović		(substituted on) 51'
MF	11	(Croatia) Mirko Oremuš		(substituted on) 65'
MF	13	(Croatia) Antonio Jakoliš		(substituted on) 82'
Manager:
(Croatia) Igor Tudor

Assistant referees:
Tomislav Petrović (Valpovo)
Miro Grgić (Osijek)
Fourth official:
Mario Zebec (Cestica)
Additional assistant referees:
Damir Batinić (Osijek)
Zlatko Šimčić (Koprivnica)

Match rules

- 90 minutes.
- Penalty shoot-out if scores still level; no extra time.
- Seven named substitutes.
- Maximum of three substitutions.
