= Mijo Caktaš =

Croatian footballer

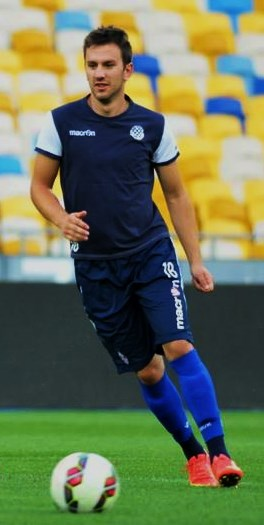
- Caktaš with Hajduk Split

Personal information
- Date of birth: 8 May 1992 (age 34)
- Place of birth: Split, Croatia
- Height: 1.79 m (5 ft 10 in)
- Position: Attacking midfielder

Team information
- Current team: Dugopolje
- Number: 11

Youth career
- Dugopolje
- 2004–2007: Omladinac Vranjic
- 2007–2008: Dugopolje
- 2009–2011: Hajduk Split

Senior career*
Years	Team	Apps	(Gls)
2008–2009	Dugopolje	21	(1)
2011–2016	Hajduk Split	95	(27)
2011–2012	→ Dugopolje (loan)	14	(4)
2016–2018	Rubin Kazan	38	(5)
2018–2021	Hajduk Split	90	(54)
2021–2022	Damac	16	(4)
2022–2024	Osijek	59	(20)
2024	Sivasspor	13	(1)
2024–2025	Kocaelispor	15	(0)
2025	Anorthosis	2	(0)
2026–	Dugopolje	14	(6)

International career^{‡}
2010	Croatia U19	2	(0)
2012–2013	Croatia U20	4	(1)
2012–2014	Croatia U21	5	(0)
2019	Croatia	1	(0)
- * Club domestic league appearances and goals as of 16 June 2026 ‡ National team caps and goals as of 16 June 2020

Mijo Caktaš (born 8 May 1992) is a Croatian professional footballer who plays as an attacking midfielder for Dugopolje.

== Club career ==
A native of Dugopolje, Mijo Caktaš started training with his hometown club NK Dugopolje, moving to the "NK Omladinac Vranjic" youth team when he was 14. After two seasons there he returned to Dugopolje, debuting for the senior team in the 2008–09 season of the Treća HNL South, at only 16 years old, he drew the attention of Hajduk Split scouts.

=== Hajduk ===
He was integrated in the Hajduk U19 team the following season. In summer 2011, he was sent to Dugopolje on loan, and his performances in the autumn Druga HNL leader earned him a call back to the Hajduk first team. In February 2012, he signed a four-and-a-half-year contract with the club. He made his debut for the first team in a 1–1 draw against Istra 1961 on 25 February 2012. The following month, he scored his first goal in Prva HNL in a 3–0 win against Rijeka and also provided two assists for Ante Vukušić. In the next game, he scored the only goal in a 1–0 victory over Cibalia.

In the 2012/13 season, Caktaš had an explosion of form as he became a main member of the first team at Poljud. He scored nine goals and assisted six more in 30 league games. The 2013/14 season started similarly well, with the player scoring two in his first seven games, but suffered a cruciate ligament rupture in round 5 and didn't return until the closing phase of the season, making just three more appearances that season.

With a full pre-season, Mijo Caktaš returned stronger than ever for the 2014–15 season. Good performances followed and the player captained his side for the first time against RNK Split in a round 9 encounter. Caktaš finished the season with 11 goals in 42 games.

Caktaš scored four goals in the Europa League Qualifiers in the 2015/16 season as Hajduk bowed out to Slovan Liberec in the final qualifying round. After good early performances in the league as well, Caktaš was handed an improved contract on 21 September 2015, ending in mid-2018.

=== Rubin Kazan ===
On 21 January 2016 he was transferred to Rubin Kazan for €1m. He signed a contract until 2019. In January 2018, Caktaš terminated his contract with Rubin Kazan due to the non-payment of wages. Rubin disputed his decision to terminate his contract and entered legal proceedings against the player. In total, Caktaš made 38 appearances for the club over two years, scoring five goals and making six assists.

=== Return to Hajduk ===
After terminating his contract with Rubin, Caktaš returned to Hajduk, signing a three-and-a-half-year deal. In July 2018, he made his 150th Hajduk appearance in a 1–0 win over PFC Slavia Sofia.

Caktaš finished the 2018-19 season as the league's top-scorer with 19 goals, and as the second best scorer of all midfielders in Europe, just behind Sporting's Bruno Fernandes that scored 20. He also won the Sportske novosti Yellow Shirt award for the best player in the league that season.

He maintained the goalscoring form in the following season, netting 20 matches in 32 games, just like the Rijeka striker Antonio Čolak who won the top scorer award due to a smaller play-time.

=== Damac FC and NK Osijek ===
After being sidelined for half a season in 2020-21, on 17 July 2021, Caktaš signed a two year long contract with Damac FC. The contract was terminated after just 6 months, having scored 4 goals in 16 games. On 21 January 2022, it was confirmed that Caktaš would continue his career in NK Osijek.

=== Sivasspor ===
On 7 February 2024, Caktaš signed a 1.5-year contract with the Turkish club Sivasspor.

== International career ==
In August 2015, he received a first call-up for the senior national team for the Euro 2016 qualifying matches against Azerbaijan and Norway, but remained an unused substitute in both matches.

On 27 May 2019, Croatian manager Zlatko Dalić activated Caktaš's stand-by call up for matches against Wales and Tunisia. He debuted in the friendly against Tunisia.

== Career statistics ==
As of match played 2 October 2025

Club	Season	League			National cup (Note: Includes Croatian Cup, Russian Cup, King Cup)		Continental		Other		Total	
Club	Season	Division	Apps	Goals	Apps	Goals	Apps	Goals	Apps	Goals	Apps	Goals
Dugopolje	2008–09	Croatian Third Football League	21	1	0	0	–		–		21	1
Dugopolje	2011–12	Croatian Second Football League	14	4	0	0	–		–		14	4
Dugopolje	Total		35	5	0	0	0	0	0	0	35	5
Hajduk Split	2011–12	Croatian First Football League	11	2	0	0	–		–		11	2
Hajduk Split	2012–13	Croatian First Football League	30	9	8	1	4 (Note: Appearances in UEFA Europa League)	0	–		42	10
Hajduk Split	2013–14	Croatian First Football League	6	1	0	0	4	1	1 (Note: Appearance in Croatian Football Super Cup)	1	11	3
Hajduk Split	2014–15	Croatian First Football League	31	9	5	0	6	2	–		42	11
Hajduk Split	2015–16	Croatian First Football League	17	6	3	0	8	4	–		28	10
Hajduk Split	Total		95	27	16	1	22	7	1	1	134	36
Rubin Kazan	2015–16	Russian Premier League	11	1	–		–		–		11	1
Rubin Kazan	2016–17	Russian Premier League	17	2	4	0	–		–		21	2
Rubin Kazan	2017–18	Russian Premier League	10	2	0	0	–		–		10	2
Rubin Kazan	Total		38	5	4	0	0	0	0	0	42	5
Hajduk Split	2017–18	Croatian First Football League	13	6	2	0	–		–		15	6
Hajduk Split	2018–19	Croatian First Football League	28	19	2	0	4	2	–		34	21
Hajduk Split	2019–20	Croatian First Football League	32	20	1	0	0	0	–		33	20
Hajduk Split	2020–21	Croatian First Football League	17	9	1	2	2	1	–		20	12
Hajduk Split	Hajduk Split total		185	81	22	3	28	10	1	1	236	95
Damac	2021–22	Saudi Pro League	16	4	1	0	–		–		17	4
Osijek	2021–22	Croatian First Football League	13	5	1	1	–		–		14	6
Osijek	2022–23	Croatian First Football League	29	8	3	1	2 (Note: Appearances in UEFA Europa Conference League)	0	–		34	9
Osijek	2023–24	Croatian First Football League	17	7	1	1	4	1	–		22	9
Osijek	Total		59	20	5	3	6	1	0	0	70	24
Sivasspor	2023–24	Süper Lig	13	1	0	0	–		–		13	1
Kocaelispor	2024–25	1. Lig	15	0	2	0	–		–		17	0
Anorthosis	2025–26	Cypriot First Division	1	0	0	0	–		–		1	0
Career total			360	114	33	6	35	11	1	1	429	132

== Honours ==
Hajduk Split

- Croatian Cup: 2012–13

Individual

- Croatian First League Top Scorer: 2018–19
- Sportske novosti Yellow Shirt award: 2018–19
