= Ante Vukušić =

Croatian footballer (born 1991)

Personal information
- Date of birth: 4 June 1991 (age 35)
- Place of birth: Sinj, SR Croatia, SFR Yugoslavia
- Height: 1.80 m (5 ft 11 in)
- Position: Forward

Team information
- Current team: Junak Sinj
- Number: 10

Youth career
- 2000–2007: Junak Sinj
- 2007–2009: Hajduk Split

Senior career*
Years	Team	Apps	(Gls)
2009–2012	Hajduk Split	84	(36)
2012–2015	Pescara	23	(1)
2014	→ Lausanne-Sport (loan)	13	(4)
2014–2015	→ Waasland-Beveren (loan)	15	(3)
2016–2017	Greuther Fürth	21	(2)
2016	→ Greuther Fürth II	1	(0)
2017–2018	Tosno	0	(0)
2018	Olimpia Grudziądz	9	(0)
2018–2019	Krško	27	(4)
2019–2021	Olimpija Ljubljana	42	(26)
2021	FCSB	5	(0)
2021–2022	Messina	12	(2)
2022	Tuzla City	6	(0)
2022–2023	Kolubara	27	(4)
2023–2024	Varaždin	9	(0)
2024–2025	Zrinski Osječko	15	(5)
2025–2026	Croatia Zmijavci	24	(1)
2026	Acireale	0	(0)
2026–	Junak Sinj	0	(0)

International career
2009	Croatia U18	6	(2)
2009–2010	Croatia U19	7	(1)
2010–2012	Croatia U21	11	(3)
2012	Croatia	1	(0)
- * Club domestic league appearances and goals as of 8 March 2026

Ante Vukušić (Croatian pronunciation: [ǎːnte ʋǔkuʃitɕ]; born 4 June 1991) is a Croatian professional footballer who plays as a forward for Croatian Third Football League club Junak Sinj.

== Club career ==
Vukušić started his career playing at youth level for his hometown club Junak Sinj. He joined Hajduk Split in 2007, and during his time at their youth academy was regarded as one of the most promising players.

=== Hajduk Split ===
In January 2009, Vukušić signed a professional 5 1/2-year contract with Hajduk, keeping him at the club until summer 2014. He made his debut for the first team in a 5–0 win against Croatia Sesvete on 22 April 2009. In the last round of 2008–09 season, he scored his first goal in Prva HNL, a late equalizer against rivals Dinamo Zagreb.

In the 2009–10 season, Vukušić established himself as the first choice striker at the club. In 22 league appearances, he scored 6 goals and a further 2 goals in 5 cup appearances. His stature at the club at such a young age impressed many of Europe's top clubs and he was set to make a move away from the Croatian club but the management and he mutually chose for him to remain at the club for the following season.

In the 2010–11 season, he scored 14 league goals in 29 appearances, finishing the season as the club's top scorer. He also scored four goals in nine UEFA Europa League appearances, the most memorable of which was a last minute winner against Anderlecht.

At the start of the 2011–12 season, under new coach Krasimir Balakov, Vukušić continued as the first choice striker at the club, this time alongside new signing Ivan Vuković as the most preferred front duo. He scored his first goal of the 2011–12 Prva HNL only three minutes into the first match against Šibenik and added his second in a match against Rijeka. In doing so he injured his toe and was consequentially ruled out for the next four weeks. He ended the season with 12 league goals in 24 appearances and 15 total goals in 29 appearances which made him the top goalscorer at the club for the second year running.

The 2012–13 season at Hajduk started with another new coach, but Ante remained the first choice striker and captain at the club, despite his young age. He converted a penalty in Hajduk's 2–0 win over Italian club Internazionale at the San Siro.

=== Pescara ===
In August 2012, Vukušić was transferred to the newly promoted Serie A club Pescara for a reported fee of around €3.8 million. He was initially the first choice striker at the club, but ended up losing his place and managed just one goal in 19 appearances as Pescara were relegated.

==== Lausanne-Sport (loan) ====
In February 2014, Vukušić moved to Lausanne-Sport on a six-month loan.

==== Waasland-Beveren (loan) ====
In August 2014, Vukušić moved to Waasland-Beveren on a loan.

=== Greuther Fürth ===
Vukušić moved to Greuther Fürth on 29 January 2016. On 7 May 2016 he extended his contract until June 2018.

=== Tosno ===
On 5 June 2017, Vukušić signed a two-year contract with the Russian Premier League club FC Tosno. Three weeks later, he underwent a surgery on his lungs, due to years-long medical problems.

=== Olimpia Grudziądz ===
On 7 March 2018, Vukušić signed with Polish club Olimpia Grudziądz. In the summer of 2018 he left Olimpia Grudziądz.

=== Krško ===
After leaving Grudziądz, Vukušić signed with Slovenian PrvaLiga club NK Krško, where he scored 4 goals in 27 appearances during the 2018–19 season.

=== FCSB ===
On 28 January 2021, it was announced that Vukušić signed with Romanian club FCSB.

== International career ==
In May 2011, Vukušić was first called up to the Croatian senior team by manager Slaven Bilić for the UEFA Euro 2012 qualifying match against Georgia, but was later moved to the under-21 squad for their opening match in the 2013 UEFA European Under-21 Football Championship qualifications, also against Georgia. On 15 August 2012, he made his debut for the senior team under manager Igor Štimac as a second-half substitute in a 4–2 defeat against Switzerland.

== Career statistics ==
=== Club ===
As of match played 26 January 2024

Appearances and goals by club, season and competition
Club	Season	League			National cup (Note: Includes Croatian Cup, Coppa Italia, Belgian Cup, DFB-Pokal, Slovenian Cup, Cupa României, Bosnia and Herzegovina Cup, Serbian Cup)		Continental		Total	
Club	Season	Division	Apps	Goals	Apps	Goals	Apps	Goals	Apps	Goals
Hajduk Split	2008–09	Prva HNL	4	1	—		—		4	1
Hajduk Split	2009–10	Prva HNL	22	6	5	2	—		27	8
Hajduk Split	2010–11	Prva HNL	29	14	2	0	9 (Note: Appearances in UEFA Europa League)	4	40	18
Hajduk Split	2011–12	Prva HNL	24	12	3	3	2	0	29	15
Hajduk Split	2012–13	Prva HNL	5	3	—		4	2	9	5
Hajduk Split	Total		84	36	10	5	15	6	109	47
Pescara	2012–13	Serie A	19	1	0	0	—		19	1
Pescara	2013–14	Serie B	3	0	1	0	—		4	0
Pescara	Total		22	1	1	0	—		23	1
Lausanne-Sport	2013–14	Swiss Super League	13	4	—		—		13	4
Waasland-Beveren	2014–15	Belgian Pro League	15	3	1	0	—		16	3
Pescara	2015–16	Serie B	1	0	1	0	—		2	0
Greuther Fürth	2015–16	2. Bundesliga	14	2	—		—		14	2
Greuther Fürth	2016–17	2. Bundesliga	7	0	1	0	—		8	0
Greuther Fürth	Total		21	2	1	0	—		22	2
Olimpia Grudziądz	2017–18	I liga	9	0	—		—		9	0
Krško	2018–19	Slovenian PrvaLiga	27	4	3	1	—		30	5
Olimpija Ljubljana	2019–20	Slovenian PrvaLiga	35	26	1	0	4	1	40	27
Olimpija Ljubljana	2020–21	Slovenian PrvaLiga	7	0	1	1	2	0	10	1
Olimpija Ljubljana	Total		42	26	2	1	6	1	50	28
FCSB	2020–21	Liga I	5	0	1	0	—		6	0
Messina	2021–22	Serie C	12	2	1 (Note: Appearance in Coppa Italia Serie C)	0	—		13	2
Tuzla City	2021–22	Premier League of BH	6	0	2	0	—		8	0
Kolubara	2022–23	Serbian SuperLiga	27	4	1	0	—		28	4
Varaždin	2023–24	Croatian Football League	9	0	1	0	—		10	0
Career total			293	82	25	7	21	7	339	96

=== International ===
As of match played 15 August 2012

Appearances and goals by national team and year
National team	Year	Apps	Goals
Croatia
Croatia	2012	1	0
Total		1	0

== Honours ==
Hajduk Split

- Croatian Cup: 2009–10

Individual

- Slovenian PrvaLiga top scorer: 2019–20
- Serbian SuperLiga Player of the Week: 2022–23 (Round 8)
