= Franko Andrijašević =

Croatian footballer (born 1991)

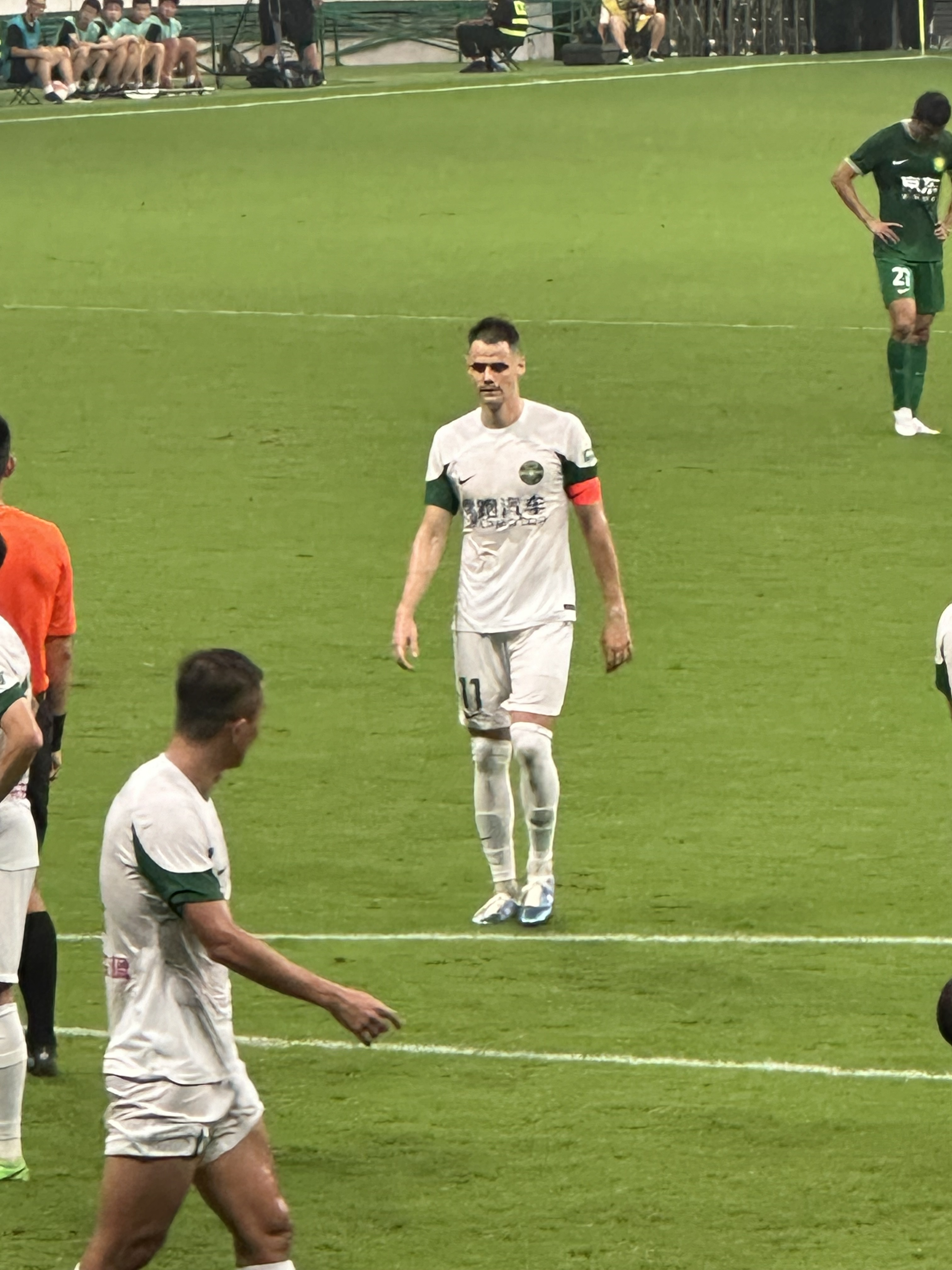
- Andrijašević in August 2024

Personal information
- Date of birth: 22 June 1991 (age 35)
- Place of birth: Split, SR Croatia, Yugoslavia
- Height: 1.89 m (6 ft 2 in)
- Position: Midfielder

Team information
- Current team: Orijent
- Number: 10

Youth career
- 2001–2009: Hajduk Split

Senior career*
Years	Team	Apps	(Gls)
2009–2014	Hajduk Split	71	(12)
2011–2012	→ Dugopolje (loan)	13	(4)
2014–2016	Dinamo Zagreb	10	(3)
2015–2016	→ Lokomotiva (loan)	42	(18)
2016–2017	Rijeka	28	(16)
2017–2021	Gent	30	(2)
2019	→ Waasland-Beveren (loan)	16	(3)
2019–2021	→ Rijeka (loan)	56	(18)
2021–2025	Zhejiang FC	122	(42)
2026–	Orijent	14	(4)

International career^{‡}
2006–2007	Croatia U16	12	(0)
2007–2008	Croatia U17	13	(2)
2008–2009	Croatia U18	12	(2)
2008–2010	Croatia U19	12	(5)
2010–2011	Croatia U20	4	(0)
2010–2012	Croatia U21	3	(0)
2013–2019	Croatia	3	(1)
- * Club domestic league appearances and goals as of 30 May 2026 ‡ National team caps and goals as of 14 January 2017

Franko Andrijašević (Croatian pronunciation: [frâŋko andrijǎːʃeʋitɕ]; born 22 June 1991) is a Croatian professional footballer who plays as a midfielder for HNK Orijent.

== Club career ==
A product of the Hajduk Split academy, Andrijašević made his professional debut on 13 May 2010 in a league match against Croatia Sesvete, in Hajduk's last match of the 2009–10 season. In August 2011, Andrijašević was loaned to second division side Dugopolje for a period of one year. On his debut against Hrvatski Dragovoljac, he scored the third goal in a 5–0 victory.

On 18 June 2014, Hajduk's fierce rival Dinamo Zagreb signed Andrijašević.

On 26 July 2016, Andrijašević signed a three-year contract with Rijeka, as part of the transfer of Marko Lešković from Rijeka to Dinamo Zagreb. In just one season, he became an instant fan-favourite, scoring 16 goals in the league, helping Rijeka win the first ever league title. He was also awarded with the Sportske novosti Yellow Shirt award for the best player of the league in the 2016–17 season.

Andrijašević joined K.A.A. Gent in July 2017 for a fee of €4.25 million.

He went on loan from Gent to Waasland-Beveren in January 2019.

He returned to Rijeka on loan in August 2019. In August 2020, his loan to Rijeka was extended for another season.

On 6 July 2021, China League One club Zhejiang FC announced the signing of Andrijašević. He would make his debut in a league game on 12 July 2021 against Beijing Sport University in a 1–0 defeat. After the game he would establish himself as a vital member of the team as the club gained promotion to the top tier at the end of the 2021 campaign. On 7 November 2025, Andrijašević announced his departure after the 2025 season.

On 2 February 2026, Andrijašević returned to Croatia and joined HNK Orijent.

== International career ==
On 22 January 2013, national team head coach Igor Štimac called up Andrijašević for a friendly match against South Korea in London on 6 February 2013. He made his debut as a substitute in the 65th minute of the game.

== Personal life ==
Franko is son of Stjepan Andrijašević and brother of Pjero Andrijašević.

== Career statistics ==
As of match played 31 December 2025

Appearances and goals by club, season and competition
Club	Season	League			Cup		Continental		Other		Total	
Club	Season	Division	Apps	Goals	Apps	Goals	Apps	Goals	Apps	Goals	Apps	Goals
Hajduk Split	2009–10	1. HNL	1	0	—		—		—		1	0
Hajduk Split	2010–11	1. HNL	7	0	1	1	1	0	—		9	1
Hajduk Split	2011–12	1. HNL	12	0	—		—		—		12	0
Hajduk Split	2012–13	1. HNL	24	6	5	1	3	0	—		32	7
Hajduk Split	2013–14	1. HNL	27	6	1	1	2	0	—		30	7
Hajduk Split	Total		71	12	7	3	6	0	—		84	15
Dugopolje (loan)	2011–12	2. HNL	13	4	—		—		—		13	4
Dinamo Zagreb	2014–15	1. HNL	10	3	2	0	3	0	—		15	3
Lokomotiva Zagreb (loan)	2014–15	1. HNL	14	6	2	0	—		—		16	6
Lokomotiva Zagreb (loan)	2015–16	1. HNL	28	12	3	2	4	1	—		35	15
Lokomotiva Zagreb (loan)	Total		42	18	5	2	4	1	—		51	21
Rijeka	2016–17	1. HNL	28	16	4	2	—		—		32	18
Gent	2017–18	Belgian First Division A	20	2	1	0	1	0	—		22	2
Gent	2018–19	Belgian First Division A	10	0	0	0	2	0	—		12	0
Gent	Total		30	2	1	0	3	0	—		34	2
Waasland-Beveren (loan)	2018–19	Belgian First Division A	16	3	—		—		—		16	3
Rijeka (loan)	2019–20	1. HNL	26	5	3	0	—		—		29	5
Rijeka (loan)	2020–21	1. HNL	30	13	3	0	7	1	—		40	14
Rijeka (loan)	Total		56	18	6	0	7	1	—		69	19
Zhejiang FC	2021	China League One	24	7	0	0	—		2 (Note: Appearances in Promotion/Relegation Play-offs)	1	26	7
Zhejiang FC	2022	Chinese Super League	32	13	2	0	—		—		34	13
Zhejiang FC	2023	Chinese Super League	20	8	0	0	7	2	—		27	10
Zhejiang FC	2024	Chinese Super League	22	4	2	0	4	4	—		28	8
Zhejiang FC	2025	Chinese Super League	24	10	1	1	—		—		25	11
Zhejiang FC	Total		122	42	5	1	11	6	2	1	140	50
Career total			388	118	30	8	34	8	2	1	454	135

=== International ===
As of match played 14 January 2017

Appearances and goals by national team and year
National team	Year	Apps	Goals
Croatia	2013	1	0
Croatia	2014	0	0
Croatia	2015	0	0
Croatia	2016	0	0
Croatia	2017	2	1
Croatia	2018	0	0
Croatia	2019	0	0
Total		3	1

Scores and results list Croatia's goal tally first, score column indicates score after each Andrijašević goal.

List of international goals scored by Franko Andrijašević
No.	Date	Venue	Opponent	Score	Result	Competition
1	11 January 2017	Guangxi Sports Center, Nanning, China	Chile	1–1	1–1 (1–4 p)	2017 China Cup

== Honours ==
Dugopolje

- Druga HNL: 2011–12

Hajduk Split

- Croatian Cup: 2012–13

Dinamo Zagreb

- Prva HNL: 2014–15
- Croatian Cup: 2014–15

Rijeka

- Prva HNL: 2016–17
- Croatian Cup: 2016–17, 2019–20

Individual

- Croatian Football Hope of the Year: 2012
- Football Oscar - Team of the Year: 2013, 2017
- HNL's Footballer of the Year: 2016
- Sportske novosti Yellow Shirt award: 2017
