= Antonio Jakoliš =

Croatian footballer (born 1992)

Personal information
- Date of birth: 28 February 1992 (age 34)
- Place of birth: Varaždin, Croatia
- Height: 1.75 m (5 ft 9 in)
- Position: Winger

Team information
- Current team: Hrvatski Dragovoljac

Youth career
- –2008: Šibenik

Senior career*
| Years | Team | Apps | (Gls) |
| 2009–2011 | Šibenik | 61 | (6) |
| 2012 | Dnipro Dnipropetrovsk | 0 | (0) |
| 2012 | → Kryvbas Kryvyi Rih (loan) | 2 | (0) |
| 2012–2013 | Kryvbas Kryvyi Rih | 4 | (0) |
| 2013 | Hajduk Split | 7 | (0) |
| 2013–2014 | Mouscron-Péruwelz | 13 | (2) |
| 2014 | Zadar | 4 | (0) |
| 2014–2016 | CFR Cluj | 68 | (9) |
| 2016–2019 | FCSB | 27 | (1) |
| 2017–2018 | → Apollon Limassol (loan) | 33 | (5) |
| 2019–2020 | APOEL | 26 | (2) |
| 2020–2021 | Panetolikos | 16 | (0) |
| 2021–2022 | Šibenik | 20 | (1) |
| 2022–2023 | Argeș Pitești | 32 | (1) |
| 2023–2024 | Fakel Voronezh | 5 | (0) |
| 2024 | Turan | 22 | (1) |
| 2025 | Šibenik | 12 | (2) |
| 2026 | Hrvatski Dragovoljac | 14 | (0) |
| 2026– | Zadar | 1 | (1) |

International career^{‡}
| 2008–2009 | Croatia U17 | 9 | (2) |
| 2010 | Croatia U18 | 1 | (1) |
| 2009–2011 | Croatia U19 | 11 | (1) |
| 2010–2012 | Croatia U20 | 10 | (0) |
| 2010–2013 | Croatia U21 | 6 | (0) |
- * Club domestic league appearances and goals as of 12 January 2026 ‡ National team caps and goals as of 24 March 2013

Antonio Jakoliš (born 28 February 1992) is a Croatian professional footballer who plays as a winger for HNK Zadar. His brother, Marin, is also a professional footballer.

== Club career ==
In January 2012, Jakoliš terminated his contract with Šibenik through arbitration and signed with Dnipro Dnipropetrovsk the following month. He was loaned to Kryvbas Kryvyi Rih and made his debut for the first team as a second-half substitute in a 2–0 defeat against Zorya Luhansk on 16 March 2012.

His Kryvbas, and indeed Dnipro Dnipropetrovsk career, was short-lived, as he signed a three-and-a-half-year contract with HNK Hajduk Split in December 2012, effective January 2013. Dnipro received no compensation as a part of the transfer. In his first interview as a Hajduk player, Antonio stated that "Sibenik is the club where I started my career and the one I will always support, but Hajduk, the club with the best fans in Croatia, are the best choice for me."

In June 2013 his contract with Hajduk Split was terminated and he signed for Belgian club Mouscron-Péruwelz.

On 2 October 2020, he signed a three-year contract with Panetolikos.

On 25 July 2023, Jakoliš joined Russian Premier League club Fakel Voronezh.

== Career statistics ==
=== Club ===
As of match played 26 November 2023

| Club | Season | League | | | National Cup | | League Cup | | Continental | | Other | | Total | |
| Club | Season | Division | Apps | Goals | Apps | Goals | Apps | Goals | Apps | Goals | Apps | Goals | Apps | Goals |
|---|---|---|---|---|---|---|---|---|---|---|---|---|---|---|
| Šibenik | 2008–09 | Prva HNL | 6 | 0 | — | | — | | — | | — | | 6 | 0 |
| Šibenik | 2009–10 | Prva HNL | 14 | 1 | 4 | 0 | — | | — | | — | | 18 | 1 |
| Šibenik | 2010–11 | Prva HNL | 28 | 2 | — | | — | | 4 | 1 | — | | 32 | 3 |
| Šibenik | 2011–12 | Prva HNL | 13 | 3 | — | | — | | — | | — | | 13 | 3 |
| Šibenik | Total | | 61 | 6 | 4 | 0 | — | | 4 | 1 | — | | 69 | 7 |
| Kryvbas Kryvyi Rih | 2011–12 (loan) | Ukrainian Premier League | 2 | 0 | — | | — | | — | | — | | 2 | 0 |
| Kryvbas Kryvyi Rih | 2012–13 | Ukrainian Premier League | 4 | 0 | — | | — | | — | | — | | 4 | 0 |
| Kryvbas Kryvyi Rih | Total | | 6 | 0 | — | | — | | — | | — | | 6 | 0 |
| Hajduk Split | 2012–13 | Prva HNL | 7 | 0 | 2 | 0 | — | | — | | — | | 9 | 0 |
| Mouscron-Péruwelz | 2013–14 | Belgian Second Division | 13 | 2 | — | | — | | — | | — | | 13 | 2 |
| Zadar | 2013–14 | Prva HNL | 4 | 0 | — | | — | | — | | — | | 4 | 0 |
| CFR Cluj | 2014–15 | Liga I | 29 | 2 | 4 | 0 | 0 | 0 | 3 | 0 | — | | 36 | 2 |
| CFR Cluj | 2015–16 | Liga I | 34 | 6 | 4 | 0 | 1 | 0 | — | | — | | 39 | 6 |
| CFR Cluj | 2016–17 | Liga I | 5 | 1 | — | | 1 | 0 | — | | 1 | 0 | 7 | 1 |
| CFR Cluj | Total | | 68 | 9 | 8 | 0 | 2 | 0 | 3 | 0 | 1 | 0 | 82 | 9 |
| FCSB | 2016–17 | Liga I | 19 | 1 | 1 | 0 | 1 | 0 | 3 | 0 | — | | 24 | 1 |
| FCSB | 2018–19 | Liga I | 8 | 0 | 2 | 0 | — | | 3 | 0 | — | | 13 | 0 |
| FCSB | Total | | 27 | 1 | 3 | 0 | 1 | 0 | 6 | 0 | — | | 37 | 1 |
| Apollon Limassol (loan) | 2017–18 | Cypriot First Division | 33 | 5 | 6 | 1 | — | | 10 | 0 | 1 | 0 | 50 | 6 |
| APOEL | 2018–19 | Cypriot First Division | 12 | 2 | 3 | 0 | — | | — | | — | | 15 | 2 |
| APOEL | 2019–20 | Cypriot First Division | 14 | 0 | 0 | 0 | — | | 13 | 0 | 1 | 0 | 28 | 0 |
| APOEL | Total | | 26 | 2 | 3 | 0 | — | | 13 | 0 | 1 | 0 | 43 | 2 |
| Panetolikos | 2020–21 | Superleague Greece | 16 | 0 | 2 | 0 | — | | — | | — | | 18 | 0 |
| Šibenik | 2021–22 | Prva HNL | 20 | 1 | 1 | 0 | — | | — | | — | | 21 | 1 |
| Argeș Pitești | 2022–23 | Liga I | 32 | 1 | 2 | 0 | — | | — | | 2 (Note: All appearances in Liga I promotion/relegation play-offs) | 1 | 36 | 2 |
| Fakel Voronezh | 2023–24 | Russian Premier League | 5 | 0 | 4 | 0 | — | | — | | — | | 9 | 0 |
| Career total | | | 318 | 27 | 36 | 1 | 3 | 0 | 36 | 1 | 5 | 1 | 397 | 30 |

== Honours ==
=== Club ===
Šibenik

- Croatian Cup runner-up: 2009–10

Hajduk Split

- Croatian Cup: 2012–13
- Croatian Super Cup runner-up: 2013

CFR Cluj

- Cupa României: 2015–16
- Supercupa României: 2016

Apollon Limassol

- Cypriot Super Cup: 2017
- Cypriot Cup runner-up: 2017–18

APOEL

- Cypriot First Division: 2018–19
- Cypriot Cup runner-up: 2018–19
- Cypriot Super Cup: 2019
