= Ante Mitrović =

Croatian footballer

Personal information
- Full name: Ante Mitrović
- Date of birth: 1 April 1988 (age 38)
- Place of birth: Zadar, SFR Yugoslavia
- Height: 1.90 m (6 ft 3 in)
- Position: Striker

Youth career
- –2004: Zadar

Senior career*
Years	Team	Apps	(Gls)
2004–2010	Zadar	69	(4)
2010	Rastane		
2011	Eisenach		
2011–2014	Zagreb	63	(4)
2014	Koper	10	(0)
2015	Zavrč	6	(0)
2015	Gorica	7	(2)
2016–2017	Metalac Gornji Milanovac	14	(1)
- * Club domestic league appearances and goals as of 1 January 2017

Ante Mitrović (born 1 April 1988) is a Croatian footballer who last played for Metalac Gornji Milanovac.

== Career ==
On 17 April 2015 Mitrović left the Slovenian football club Zavrč after four months. On 17 July 2016 he debuted in the Serbian SuperLiga with FK Metalac Gornji Milanovac.

== Honour ==
NK Zagreb

- Croatian Second League: 2013–14
