= NK Vrsar =

Croatian football club

Vrsar
- Full name: Nogometni klub Vrsar
- Founded: 1975 or 1955
- Ground: NK Vrsar
- Capacity: 1.500
- Chairman: Tomislav Popović
- Manager: Robert Macan
- League: First League of Istarska county
Home colours	Away colours

NK Vrsar is a Croatian football club based in the village of Vrsar. It was founded on 12 May 1975 or 1955

They currently compete in the 1. ŽNL Istarska, the 6th level of football league divisions in Croatia.

In the 2000s, Vrsar competed in the 3rd Croatian National League, the manager was Dragan Simeunović.

== Stadium ==
Their stadium is Igralište NK Vrsar in Vrsar city, its have a capacity of 1500.
