= Tino-Sven Sušić =

Bosnian footballer (born 1992)

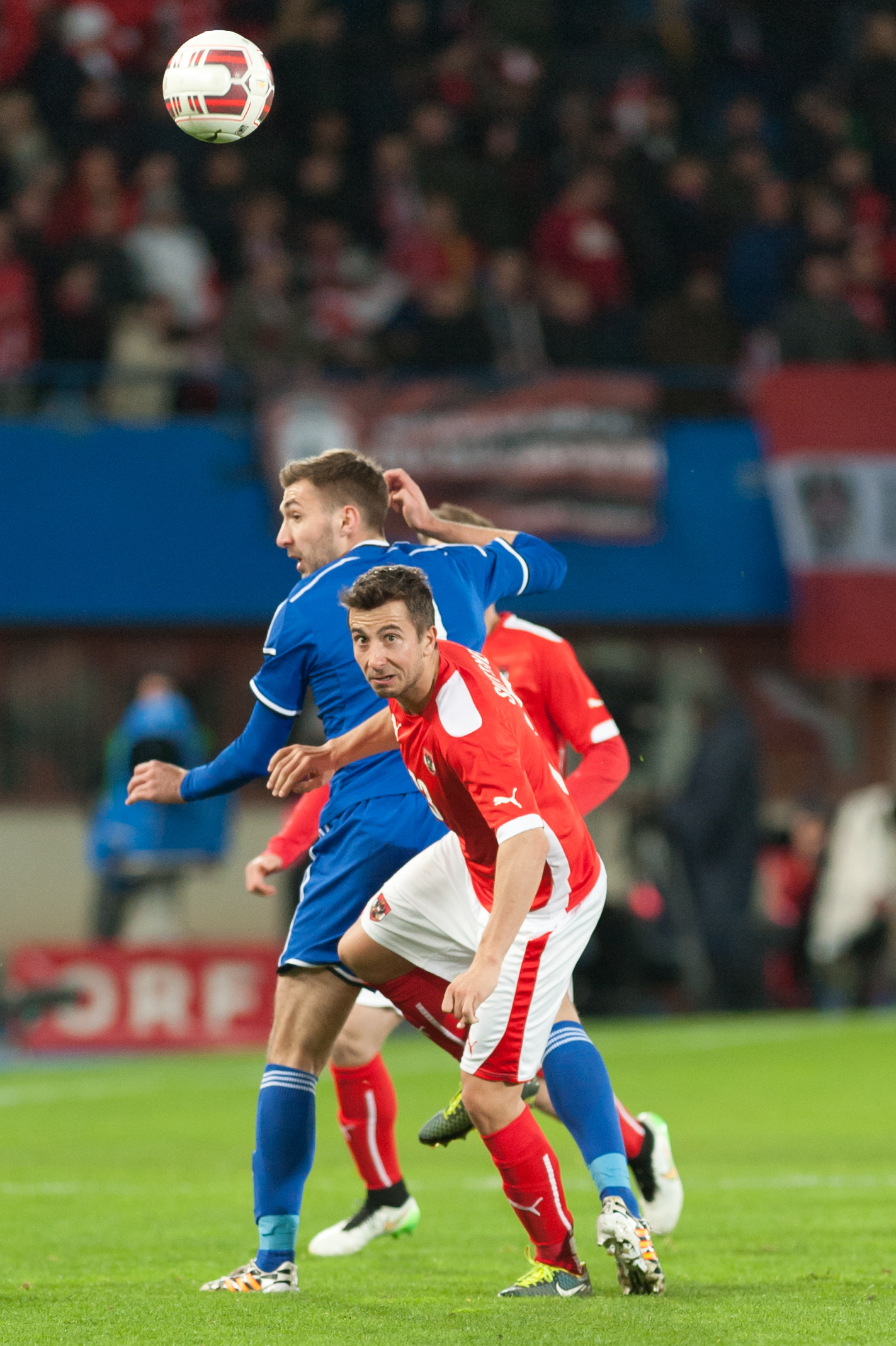
- Sušić (blue kit) playing for Bosnia and Herzegovina in March 2015

Personal information
- Date of birth: 13 February 1992 (age 34)
- Place of birth: Sarajevo, SR Bosnia and Herzegovina, SFR Yugoslavia
- Height: 1.86 m (6 ft 1 in)
- Position: Attacking midfielder

Youth career
- 2004–2007: Visé
- 2007–2009: Genk
- 2009–2012: Standard Liège

Senior career*
Years	Team	Apps	(Gls)
2012–2016	Hajduk Split	104	(19)
2016–2018	Genk	15	(0)
2017–2018	→ Maccabi Tel Aviv (loan)	4	(0)
2018	Antwerp	2	(0)
2018–2019	VVV-Venlo	27	(5)
2019	TSV Hartberg	2	(0)
2020–2021	Sarajevo	26	(2)
2021–2022	Kuban Krasnodar	8	(0)
2022	Tabor Sežana	3	(0)
2023	Rudeš	4	(0)
2023–2024	Tuzla City	23	(0)
2024	Francavilla	3	(0)
2025–2026	US Trodica	0	(0)
2026	Potenza Picena	0	(0)

International career
2010	Belgium U18	3	(1)
2010	Belgium U19	6	(0)
2014–2016	Bosnia and Herzegovina	9	(0)
- * Club domestic league appearances and goals as of 17 November 2024

Tino-Sven Sušić (Bosnian pronunciation: [tîːno-sʋěn sǔʃitɕ]; born 13 February 1992) is a Bosnian professional footballer who plays as an attacking midfielder.

Sušić started his professional career at Hajduk Split, before joining Genk in 2016. In 2017–18, he had a loan spell with Maccabi Tel Aviv. He then moved to Antwerp in 2018. Later that year he signed with Venlo. After leaving Venlo in 2019, Sušić then joined Austrian Bundesliga club TSV Hartberg, where he played for half a year. In February 2020, he joined Bosnian Premier League club Sarajevo. Sušić left Sarajevo in August 2021.

A former Belgian youth international, he made his senior international debut for Bosnia and Herzegovina in 2014. Sušić represented the nation at their first major tournament, the 2014 FIFA World Cup.

== Club career ==
=== Early career ===
Born in Sarajevo, Sušić emigrated with his family early in his life to Belgium. He started training with the second-tier Visé, before moving to the youth side of Genk. At the age of 16, he moved to Standard Liège. In August 2010, he was called up to the Belgium under-19 side, featuring in two matches as a substitute, playing a friendly match for Standard Liège first team as well. Not breaking through, he continued playing for the team's youth sides.

=== Hajduk Split ===
In June 2012 he joined Croatian side Hajduk Split on a four-year contract. He made his debut on 19 July at the age of 20 in a UEFA Europa League qualifier against Skonto. On 31 October, he scored his first goal against city rivals Split. Sušić won his first trophy with the club on 22 May 2013, by beating Lokomotiva in the Croatian Cup final.

In February 2015, Sušić signed a new contract with Hajduk expiring in June 2018.

Sušić won the Sportske novosti Yellow Shirt award for the 2015–16 season, which is given to the best player in the league.

=== Genk ===
On 29 August 2016, he rejoined his once youth club Genk in a transfer worth approximately €2 million. He made his first appearance for Genk against Standard Liège on 11 September. Sušić scored his first goal for the club against Athletic Bilbao in UEFA Europa League group game.

On 7 August 2017 Sušić joined Maccabi Tel Aviv on a one-year loan deal in order to get more minutes.

=== Antwerp ===
After falling to get regular first-team football, his loan spell at Maccabi Tel Aviv was ended in January 2018. Consequently, Sušić terminated his contract with Genk and signed for Antwerp until June 2019. He had to wait for over two months on his official debut, which came in a league game against St. Truiden.

=== Venlo ===
In July 2018, Sušić signed a one-year contract with Dutch club Venlo, with an option for additional year. He debuted in a competitive game on 11 August against Willem II. On 26 August, he scored his first goal for the club against Utrecht.

=== TSV Hartberg ===
On 19 October 2019, Sušić signed a one-year contract with Austrian club TSV Hartberg. After playing only two league matches for Hartberg, he was released by the club in January 2020.

=== Sarajevo ===
On 1 February 2020, Sušić joined Bosnian Premier League club Sarajevo, signing a two-year contract with the club. He made his official debut and scored his first official goal for Sarajevo in a 6–2 league win against Tuzla City on 22 February 2020. Sušić won his first league title with Sarajevo on 1 June 2020, though after the 2019–20 Bosnian Premier League season was ended abruptly due to the COVID-19 pandemic in Bosnia and Herzegovina and after which Sarajevo were by default crowned league champions for a second consecutive time.

In the 2020–21 season, he won his second trophy with the club, winning the Bosnian Cup after beating Borac Banja Luka in the final.

After playing a few games at the start of the 2021–22 season, Sušić decided to terminate his contract with Sarajevo and leave the club in August 2021.

=== Kuban Krasnodar ===
On 2 October 2021, Sušić signed with second-tier Russian Football National League club Kuban Krasnodar. On 17 March 2022, his contract was terminated by mutual consent.

=== Tabor Sežana ===
In April 2022, he joined Slovenian PrvaLiga side Tabor Sežana for the remainder of the 2021–22 season, utilizing the new transfer rules that allowed footballers playing in Russia to sign for other teams due to the Russian invasion of Ukraine.

== International career ==
Holding multiple citizenship, Sušić was eligible to represent three nations on senior level: Belgium, Croatia and Bosnia and Herzegovina, having played for Belgium at various youth levels. In October 2013, he confirmed that he would play for Bosnia and Herzegovina.

He received his first senior call-up in February 2014, for a friendly game against Egypt, and debuted in that game on 5 March.

Later that year Sušić was named in Bosnia and Herzegovina's squad for the 2014 FIFA World Cup, which was the country's first major tournament. He made his competition debut against Nigeria on 22 June.

== Personal life ==
Tino-Sven was born in Sarajevo to former Yugoslavia international Sead Sušić and a Croat mother. He is also a nephew of Safet Sušić. His mother Irena hails from Podgora.

On 14 June 2019, Sušić married his long-time girlfriend Glenis Jankov.

== Career statistics ==
=== Club ===
As of match played 31 July 2021

Appearances and goals by club, season and competition
Club	Season	League			National cup		Continental		Other		Total	
Club	Season	Division	Apps	Goals	Apps	Goals	Apps	Goals	Apps	Goals	Apps	Goals
Hajduk Split	2012–13	Prva HNL	17	1	7	3	1	0	—		25	4
Hajduk Split	2013–14	Prva HNL	32	3	3	0	4	0	1 (Note: Appearance in 2013 Croatian Football Super Cup)	0	40	3
Hajduk Split	2014–15	Prva HNL	26	3	4	1	3	2	—		33	6
Hajduk Split	2015–16	Prva HNL	27	12	5	3	5	0	—		37	15
Hajduk Split	2016–17	Prva HNL	2	0	0	0	5	2	—		7	2
Hajduk Split	Total		104	19	19	7	18	4	1	0	142	30
Genk	2016–17	Belgian First Division A	15	0	4	0	5	1	—		24	1
Maccabi Tel Aviv (loan)	2017–18	Israeli Premier League	4	0	0	0	5	0	—		9	0
Antwerp	2017–18	Belgian First Division A	2	0	—		—		—		2	0
Venlo	2018–19	Eredivisie	27	5	1	0	—		—		28	5
TSV Hartberg	2019–20	Austrian Bundesliga	2	0	0	0	—		—		2	0
Sarajevo	2019–20	Bosnian Premier League	2	1	—		—		—		2	1
Sarajevo	2020–21	Bosnian Premier League	21	1	2	0	3	0	—		26	1
Sarajevo	2021–22	Bosnian Premier League	3	0	—		2	0	—		5	0
Sarajevo	Total		26	2	2	0	5	0	0	0	33	2
Career total			180	26	26	7	33	5	1	0	240	38

=== International ===
Appearances and goals by national team and year
National team	Year	Apps	Goals
Bosnia and Herzegovina
Bosnia and Herzegovina	2014	7	0
Bosnia and Herzegovina	2015	1	0
Bosnia and Herzegovina	2016	1	0
Total		9	0

== Honours ==
Hajduk Split

- Croatian Cup: 2012–13

Maccabi Tel Aviv

- Toto Cup: 2017–18

Sarajevo

- Bosnian Premier League: 2019–20
- Bosnian Cup: 2020–21

=== Individual ===
Awards

- SN Yellow Shirt Award: 2015–16
