= Goran Milović =

Croatian footballer (born 1989)

Personal information
- Date of birth: 29 January 1989 (age 37)
- Place of birth: Split, SR Croatia, Yugoslavia
- Height: 1.95 m (6 ft 5 in)
- Position: Centre-back

Team information
- Current team: Hajduk Split (assistant)

Youth career
- RNK Split

Senior career*
Years	Team	Apps	(Gls)
2008–2012	RNK Split	80	(8)
2012–2016	Hajduk Split	115	(4)
2016–2018	Chongqing Lifan	34	(1)
2018	→ Osijek (loan)	12	(2)
2018–2020	KV Oostende	66	(2)
2020–2021	Olimpija Ljubljana	8	(1)
2021	Diósgyőri	17	(1)
2021–2023	Olimpija Ljubljana	32	(1)
Total		364	(20)

International career
2015	Croatia	1	(0)

Managerial career
- 2024: Hajduk Split U-17 (assistant)
- 2024–: Hajduk Split (assistant)
- * Club domestic league appearances and goals

Goran Milović (Croatian pronunciation: [ɡǒran mîːloʋitɕ]; born 29 January 1989) is a former Croatian professional footballer who played as a defender.

== Club career ==
=== RNK Split ===
In 2008, Goran Milović was promoted from RNK Split's youth academy to their first team, which competed in the Croatian third division at the time. After the club won back-to-back promotions, he made his Croatian top division debut on 31 July 2010 against Varaždin. Overall, he made 80 league appearances for the club, scoring 8 goals.

=== Hajduk Split ===
He made a move across the city and joined their city rivals Hajduk Split in a transfer where Hajduk paid no compensation for his services. Hajduk manager Krasimir Balakov played him in every game for the rest of the season after Milović made his debut against his former club RNK Split. When Mišo Krstičević was appointed as the new manager, Milović remained a vital part of the defense, making 26 appearances in the 2012–13 season. In the 2013–14 season, he made 40 appearances in all competitions and was even handed the captain's armband on four occasions.

=== Chongqing Lifan ===
On 2 February 2016, Milović moved to the Chinese Super League side Chongqing Lifan in an €800,000 deal. He signed a three-and-a-half-year deal with the club, worth approximately €500,000 a year. He made his debut for the club on 6 March 2016 in a 2–1 victory against Guangzhou Evergrande. On 12 February 2018, Milović was loaned to Osijek until the end of the season, with a buying option.

=== KV Oostende ===
On 13 June 2018, Milović signed a two-year contract with Belgian First Division A club KV Oostende. Chongqing Lifan confirmed on the next day that Milović had terminated the contract with the club and joined KV Oostende on a free transfer.

=== Retirement ===
After playing his last season in Olimpija Ljubljana where he won the league title and domestic cup in 2023, he announced his retirement from professional football on 30 September 2023.

== International career ==
In October 2015, he received his first call-up for the Croatian senior national team for a friendly game against Russia. In the match against Russia, held on 17 November 2015, he made his debut after replacing Nikola Kalinić in the 75th minute in an eventual 3–1 win.

== Coaching career ==
In January 2024, after hanging up his boots six months earlier, Milović returned to his former club, Hajduk Split, where he was hired as assistant coach of the club's U-17 team under manager Luka Vučko. Already on April 1, 2024, in the wake of Mislav Karoglan stepping down as coach of the club, Jure Ivanković was hired as the new interim coach for the rest of the season. He chose to bring Milović onto his first team staff as assistant coach.

== Honours ==
RNK Split

- Croatian Third League: 2008–09
- Croatian Second League: 2009–10

Hajduk Split

- Croatian Cup: 2012–13

Olimpija Ljubljana

- Slovenian PrvaLiga: 2022–23
- Slovenian Cup: 2022–23
