= Mirko Oremuš =

Croatian footballer (born 1988)

Personal information
- Date of birth: 6 September 1988 (age 38)
- Place of birth: Trogir, SFR Yugoslavia
- Height: 1.78 m (5 ft 10 in)
- Positions: Right winger; right-back

Youth career
- –2003: Val Kaštel Stari
- 2003–2007: Hajduk Split

Senior career*
Years	Team	Apps	(Gls)
2007	Hajduk Split	1	(1)
2008	Novalja	13	(6)
2008–2014	Hajduk Split	78	(7)
2011–2012	→ Hapoel Tel Aviv (loan)	19	(2)
2013–2014	→ Hapoel Ironi Acre (loan)	27	(2)
2014–2015	Hapoel Petah Tikva	29	(2)
2015–2016	RNK Split	16	(1)
2016–2018	Hapoel Ashkelon	48	(7)
2018–2019	Hapoel Ra'anana	30	(1)
2019–2022	Sarajevo	46	(0)
2023–2024	Igman Konjic	37	(0)

International career
2007	Croatia U19	6	(0)
2009	Croatia U20	2	(2)
2009–2010	Croatia U21	10	(1)
- * Club domestic league appearances and goals as of 1 June 2024

Mirko Oremuš (born 6 September 1988) is a Croatian professional footballer.

== Club career ==
Oremuš joined the Hajduk Split academy in 2003, joining from Val Kaštel Stari. A youth national team player, he debuted in the Hajduk first team by scoring against Slaven Belupo, coming in from the bench for the last 14 minutes of the game. He was, however, deemed surplus by the manager and made no further appearances that autumn. This prompted him to rescind his contract with the club and move to third-tier club Novalja.

After a very good spring there, he was called back to Hajduk, where he remained for the next three seasons. Originally considered a forward when he entered the first team, he was moved permanently to the right wing, sometimes even appearing on right back when the club lacked other options.

On 31 August 2011, Oremuš joined Hapoel Tel Aviv in a one-year loan move with a clause in which Hapoel could buy out his contract. He had a difficult start at Hapoel, not managing to retain a steady place at the starting eleven under veteran manager Dror Kashtan. In January, Kashtan resigned along with the vast majority of the Hapoel Tel Aviv board and staff, and replaced by Nitzan Shirazi. Under Shirazi, Oremuš gradually became an important player for the team, scoring 5 goals and providing 6 assists, including the first goal in a 2–1 win over Maccabi Haifa at the Israeli State Cup final.

Oremuš returned to Croatia at the end of the season, having a good period overall at Hapoel and becoming a fan favourite. Due to financial difficulties at Hapoel, the club were unable to pay his buy-out clause and so he returned to Hajduk as a more mature player than he left and was therefore reintegrated into the first team of the 'Bili'.

Oremuš returned to Israel on 27 June 2013, and signed with Bnei Sakhnin, but he was released before the season started. On 17 September, he signed with Hapoel Ironi Acre. On 23 November, he scored his first goal for the team in a 3–2 victory against Bnei Yehuda Tel Aviv. In this season, Oremuš made 27 overall appearances, scoring 2 goals in the process. On 17 July 2014, he signed with Hapoel Petah Tikva, which was promoted from the Liga Leumit to the Israeli Premier League. After Hapoel Petah Tikva, he also played for Split, Hapoel Ashkelon and Hapoel Ra'anana.

On 26 June 2019, Oremuš signed a contract with Bosnian Premier League club Sarajevo. He made his official debut and also scored his first goal for Sarajevo on 9 July 2019, in a 1–3 home loss against Celtic in the 2019–20 UEFA Champions League first qualifying round. He played his first league match for Sarajevo on 27 October 2019, in a 1–1 away league draw against Sloboda Tuzla. Oremuš won his first league title with Sarajevo on 1 June 2020, though after the 2019–20 Bosnian Premier League season was ended abruptly due to the COVID-19 pandemic in Bosnia and Herzegovina and after which Sarajevo were by default crowned league champions for a second consecutive time. On 17 June 2020, he extended his contract with the club which is due to last until June 2021. On 20 February 2021, Oremuš again extended his contract with Sarajevo until June 2023.

== International career ==
Oremuš represented Croatia on various youth international levels.

He is most remembered for playing for the Croatia U21 national team from 2009 to 2010, making 10 appearances and scoring 1 goal in the process. He also played for the U20 and U19 national teams.

== Honours ==
Hajduk Split

- Croatian Cup: 2009–10, 2012–13

Hapoel Tel Aviv

- Israel State Cup: 2011–12

Sarajevo

- Bosnian Premier League: 2019–20
- Bosnian Cup: 2020–21
