= Ivo Caput =

Croatian football forward

Personal information
- Date of birth: 15 February 1993 (age 33)
- Place of birth: Dubrovnik, Croatia
- Height: 1.93 m (6 ft 4 in)
- Position: Forward

Team information
- Current team: GOŠK Dubrovnik

Youth career
- 2004–2006: Škola Nogometa Jozo Matošić Dubrovnik
- 2006–2007: Dubrovnik 1919
- 2007–2011: GOŠK Dubrovnik

Senior career*
Years	Team	Apps	(Gls)
2010–2012	GOŠK Dubrovnik	55	(16)
2012–2013	Hajduk Split	0	(0)
2012	→ GOŠK Dubrovnik (loan)		
2013–2014	GOŠK Dubrovnik		
2015	SVN Zweibrücken	13	(0)
2015–2017	Novigrad	28	(4)
2017–	GOŠK Dubrovnik		
- * Club domestic league appearances and goals as of 8 September 2012 ‡ National team caps and goals as of 8 September 2012

Ivo Caput (born 15 February 1993 in Dubrovnik) is a Croatian football forward, currently playing for NK GOŠK Dubrovnik 1919.

== Club career ==
Born in Dubrovnik, Caput passed through the youth ranks of the local clubs HNK Dubrovnik 1919 and NK GOŠK Dubrovnik before debuting for the GOŠK senior team, aged 17. He subsequently became a permanent starter for his club, and his 13 goals in the 2012-2013 Treća HNL Jug season drew the attention of Hajduk Split. He was signed by Hajduk in August 2012, but sent back for the autumn period on a loan to his old club.

In June 2013 his contract with Hajduk was terminated

In September 2015 Caput moved from SVN Zweibrücken to NK Novigrad.
