= Luka Lučić =

Croatian footballer (born 1995)

Personal information
- Date of birth: 2 January 1995 (age 31)
- Place of birth: Split, Croatia
- Height: 1.82 m (6 ft 0 in)
- Position: Left-back

Team information
- Current team: Hrvace

Youth career
- 2005–2009: Posušje
- 2009–2010: Imotski
- 2010–2013: Hajduk Split

Senior career*
Years	Team	Apps	(Gls)
2013–2014	Hajduk Split	3	(0)
2014	→ Hajduk Split B (loan)	3	(0)
2015–2016	Baník Ostrava	20	(0)
2016–2018	Zrinjski Mostar	11	(0)
2018	→ Borac Banja Luka (loan)	6	(0)
2020	Posušje	13	(4)
2021	Tuzla City	10	(1)
2021–2024	Posušje	76	(5)
2024–2025	Slaven Belupo	31	(1)
2025–2026	Zagłębie Lubin	24	(0)
2026–	Hrvace	0	(0)

International career
2011	Croatia U17	8	(1)
2013–2014	Croatia U19	8	(0)
- * Club domestic league appearances and goals as of 17:39, 29 May 2026 (UTC)

Luka Lučić (born 2 January 1995) is a Croatian professional footballer who plays as a left-back for Prva HNL club Hrvace.

== Club career ==
Lučić is a youth product of Hajduk Split. He made his professional debut in the Prva HNL on 26 May 2013 against Dinamo Zagreb, playing as a left-back. He remained in the U19 team, making only two appearances for the first team in the 2013–14 season despite playing for the Croatia U19 national team, and playing for the B team in the first part of the 2014–15 season.

In January 2015, Lučić joined Czech First League team Baník Ostrava, signing a professional contract until 30 June 2018.

== Honours ==
Zrinjski Mostar

- Bosnian Premier League: 2016–17
