= Danijel Stojanović =

Croatian footballer

Personal information
- Full name: Danijel Stojanović
- Date of birth: 18 August 1984 (age 42)
- Place of birth: Našice, SFR Yugoslavia
- Height: 1.75 m (5 ft 9 in)
- Position: Left-back

Youth career
- 1993–1997: Đurđenovac
- 1997–2001: NAŠK
- 2001–2003: Cibalia

Senior career*
Years	Team	Apps	(Gls)
2003–2004	Cibalia		
2004	Hrvatski Dragovoljac		
2005–2008	Posušje	55	(5)
2008–2010	Zrinjski Mostar	46	(7)
2010–2012	Nacional	19	(0)
2012–2013	Hajduk Split	22	(0)
2013–2017	Zrinjski Mostar	61	(0)
2017	Željezničar	8	(0)
2017–2020	Olimpik	56	(6)
- * Club domestic league appearances and goals as of 7 March 2020

Danijel Stojanović (born 18 August 1984) is a Croatian professional footballer who plays as a left-back.

A part from playing as a left-back as his main position, he can even play in a more advanced left wing-back role.

== Career ==
Stojanović began his professional football career at the youth team of Croatian 1. HNL club Cibalia, where he played for two years under a youth contract. In 2005, he earned his first professional contract with, at the time, Bosnian Premier League side Posušje. In the three years he spent at the club, for the most time Stojanović was the first choice left-back and made 55 league appearances, scoring five goals.

These performances merited a move to the ambitious club Zrinjski Mostar in 2008. He was immediately a starter for the club. In the title winning season of 2008–09, Stojanović made 29 appearances and scored six goals while in the previous season, due to injuries he managed only 17 league appearances.

At the end of the 2009–10 season, his contract with Zrinjski came to an end and so Stojanović decided to continue his career in Portugal, signing as a free agent on a two-year deal with Nacional. He became only the second Zrinjski Mostar player to move to Portugal, after Lamine Diarra made the switch in 2007. He struggled to acclimatise to the speed and quality of the Portuguese Primeira Liga and only made 19 appearances during his time at the club.

He then moved back to his homeland, signing for Hajduk Split as a replacement for the departing Rúben Lima. Stojanović was officially unveiled as a new player of Hajduk on 4 July 2012. He won the Croatian Cup with the club in May 2013.

In June 2013, Stojanović's contract with Hajduk was terminated, and on 29 December 2013, he returned to Zrinjski Mostar. He played for Zrinjski until January 2017, winning 2 more league titles in the process. After Zrinjski, Stojanović spent a short time with Željezničar from January to June 2017.

In June 2017, he signed a contract with, at the time, First League of FBiH club Olimpik. Stojanović scored his first goal for Olimpik on 19 May 2019, in a 6–1 home league win against TOŠK Tešanj. On 26 May 2020, the 2019–20 First League of FBiH season ended abruptly due to the ongoing COVID-19 pandemic in Bosnia and Herzegovina and, by default, Stojanović with Olimpik were crowned league champions and got promoted back to the Bosnian Premier League. After his contract with the club expired, he left Olimpik on 15 June 2020.

== Honours ==
Zrinjski Mostar

- Bosnian Premier League: 2008–09, 2013–14, 2015–16

Hajduk Split

- Croatian Cup: 2012–13

Olimpik

- First League of FBiH: 2019–20
