= Dominik Picak =

Croatian footballer

Personal information
- Date of birth: 12 February 1992 (age 34)
- Place of birth: Zagreb, Croatia
- Height: 1.92 m (6 ft 3 1/2 in)
- Position: Goalkeeper

Team information
- Current team: Maksimir (player & gk coach)
- Number: 1

Youth career
- Dinamo Zagreb
- 2010–2011: Lokomotiva

Senior career*
Years	Team	Apps	(Gls)
2009	Dinamo Zagreb	38	(0)
2010–2013	Lokomotiva	43	(0)
2014–2015	Slaven Belupo	20	(0)
2015	Zavrč	17	(0)
2016	BV Cloppenburg	0	(0)
2016–2017	Dugopolje	30	(0)
2017–2019	Rudeš	20	(0)
2019	Kustošija	8	(0)
2020–2021	SV Babelsberg 03	3	(0)
2021–2022	UiTM	5	(0)
2022–2023	Sesvete	27	(0)
2023–2024	Zelina	30	(0)
2024–	Maksimir	0	(0)

International career
2007	Croatia U15	3	(0)
2007–2009	Croatia U17	20	(0)
2010	Croatia U18	6	(0)
2010	Croatia U19	5	(0)
2011	Croatia U21	0	(0)

Managerial career
- 2024–: Maksimir (goalkeeping coach)
- * Club domestic league appearances and goals as of 21:03, 12 March 2024 (UTC)

Dominik Picak (born 12 February 1992) is a Croatian football goalkeeper who plays for Croatian club NK Maksimir .

== Club career ==
Picak was promoted to Dinamo Zagreb's first team in the summer of 2009, becoming the third-choice goalkeeper behind Tomislav Butina and Filip Lončarić after the club's previous second-choice goalkeeper, Ivan Kelava, was loaned to Lokomotiva Zagreb. He made his competitive debut for the first team on 6 December 2009 in Dinamo's 4–1 away win at NK Međimurje in the Croatian First League, playing the whole match due to injuries to both Butina and Lončarić.

In January 2010, Picak was sent to Lokomotiva Zagreb with whom he initially signed a stipend contract. He did not appear in any competitive matches for the club until the end of the 2009–10 season, playing for the U19 team and serving as back-up for fellow Dinamo Zagreb loanee Ivan Kelava, and the club signed a 7-year professional contract with him in August 2010.

== International career ==
In 2007, Picak started playing for the Croatian national under-15 football team, and also made his debut for the country's under-17 national team during the same year. In 2010, he was promoted to the country's under-19 national team. Up to date, he won a total of 33 international caps for the Croatian national football teams at the under-15 to under-19 levels.

On 11 August 2013, due to Danijel Subašić's injury, Picak was called up as a replacement, by Croatia's head coach Igor Štimac for a friendly match against Liechtenstein on 14 August 2013.

== Coaching career ==
In February 2024, Picak joined NK Maksimir as a goalkeeper coach and player.
