= Ivan Peko =

Croatian footballer

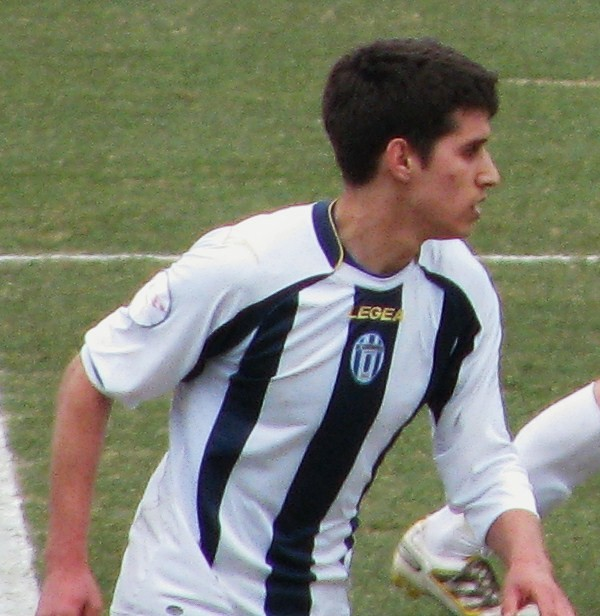
- Peko playing for Lokomotiva in 2010

Personal information
- Date of birth: 5 January 1990 (age 36)
- Place of birth: Široki Brijeg, SFR Yugoslavia
- Height: 1.86 m (6 ft 1 in)
- Position: Winger

Team information
- Current team: GOŠK Gabela
- Number: 9

Youth career
- Ljuti Dolac
- 2003–2007: Zrinjski Mostar
- 2007–2008: Dinamo Zagreb

Senior career*
Years	Team	Apps	(Gls)
2007–2013	Dinamo Zagreb	11	(0)
2008–2012	→ Lokomotiva (loan)	90	(9)
2013	Lokomotiva	7	(0)
2014–2015	Široki Brijeg	28	(4)
2015–2017	Zrinjski Mostar	36	(1)
2017–2018	Vitez	11	(1)
2018	Široki Brijeg	10	(0)
2019	Horn	2	(0)
2020–2021	Neretva	0	(0)
2021–	GOŠK Gabela	38	(0)

International career
2008	Croatia U19	1	(0)
- * Club domestic league appearances and goals as of 24 May 2019

Ivan Peko (born 5 January 1990) is a Croatian professional footballer who plays for First League of FBiH club GOŠK Gabela.

== Career ==
He had a spell with Austrian second tier-side Horn.

== Honours ==
Dinamo Zagreb

- 1. HNL: 2012–13

Zrinjski Mostar

- Bosnian Premier League: 2015–16, 2016–17
