= Anton Maglica =

Bosnian-born Croatian football striker (born 1991)

Personal information
- Date of birth: 11 November 1991 (age 34)
- Place of birth: Brčko, SR Bosnia and Herzegovina, SFR Yugoslavia
- Height: 1.80 m (5 ft 11 in)
- Position: Striker

Youth career
- 2004–2006: Orašje
- 2006–2010: Osijek

Senior career*
Years	Team	Apps	(Gls)
2009–2012	Osijek	44	(11)
2012–2016	Hajduk Split	85	(24)
2016–2019	Apollon Limassol	82	(40)
2019–2021	Guizhou Hengfeng	33	(21)
2021	Kayserispor	8	(1)
2021–2022	APOEL	30	(5)
2023	CFR Cluj	10	(1)
2023–2024	Zrinjski Mostar	3	(0)
2024	Austria Klagenfurt	6	(0)
Total		293	(102)

International career
2009	Croatia U18	4	(0)
2009–2010	Croatia U19	8	(4)
2012	Croatia U21	2	(0)
- * Club domestic league appearances and goals as of 26 May 2024

Anton Maglica (born 11 November 1991) is a Croatian professional footballer who plays as a striker.

== Club career ==
=== Osijek ===
Born in Brčko, Maglica started his career playing at youth level for Orašje. After he moved to Osijek to attend high school, he immediately underwent trial at NK Osijek and joined their youth team. He made his debut for the first team in the last round of 2008–09 Prva HNL season against Slaven Belupo on 31 May 2009, when he replaced Josip Knežević for the final twenty minutes of the match. Next season he also got the chance as a substitute in the last round, this time in a home win against Cibalia. He scored his first goal in Prva HNL in a 1–0 victory over Cibalia at fog-covered Gradski vrt.

=== Hajduk Split ===
In the 2010–11 and 2011–12 seasons, Maglica made a name for himself as one of the best up and coming young Croatian attacking talents in the 1. HNL and was signed by league giants HNK Hajduk Split, rejected a larger offer from GNK Dinamo Zagreb in the process and immediately endearing himself to the club's loyal fans. He scored his first goal for his new club after coming on as a substitute against NK Zagreb. He scored the fifth goal of an emphatic 5–1 victory. His first season with the Bili gave a disappointing return of 5 goals in 17 appearances. The 13/14 season was far more successful for the striker as he scored 12 goals in 31 appearances.

He left Hajduk in January 2016 to join Cypriot side Apollon Limassol.

=== Apollon Limassol ===
Maglica signed for Apollon Limassol in a winter transfer window of the 2016–17 season.

=== Guizhou Hengfeng ===
Maglica signed for Chinese side Guizhou Hengfeng in a winter transfer window of the 2018–19 season.

=== Austria Klagenfurt ===
On 2 February 2024, Maglica signed with Austria Klagenfurt in Austria.

== Career statistics ==
Statistics accurate as of match played 1 June 2023.

Appearances and goals by club, season and competition
Club	Season	League			National Cup		Continental		Other		Total	
Club	Season	Division	Apps	Goals	Apps	Goals	Apps	Goals	Apps	Goals	Apps	Goals
Osijek	2008–09	Prva HNL	1	0	—		—		—		1	0
Osijek	2009–10	Prva HNL	1	0	—		—		—		1	0
Osijek	2010–11	Prva HNL	19	4	1	0	—		—		20	4
Osijek	2011–12	Prva HNL	23	7	6	3	—		—		29	10
Osijek	Total		44	11	7	3	—		—		51	14
Hajduk Split	2012–13	Prva HNL	17	5	7	1	2	0	—		26	6
Hajduk Split	2013–14	Prva HNL	31	12	1	0	4	0	—		36	12
Hajduk Split	2014–15	Prva HNL	21	7	4	4	5	1	—		30	12
Hajduk Split	2015–16	Prva HNL	16	0	1	2	5	2	—		20	4
Hajduk Split	Total		85	24	13	7	16	3	—		114	34
Apollon Limassol	2015–16	Cypriot First Division	14	8	4	1	0	0	—		18	9
Apollon Limassol	2016–17	Cypriot First Division	25	9	6	3	2	0	1 (Note: Appearances in Cypriot Super Cup)	0	34	12
Apollon Limassol	2017–18	Cypriot First Division	26	16	5	1	11	0	1	0	43	17
Apollon Limassol	2018–19	Cypriot First Division	17	7	1	1	13	3	—		31	11
Apollon Limassol	Total		82	40	16	6	26	3	2	0	126	49
Guizhou Hengfeng	2019	China League One	21	16	0	0	—		—		21	16
Guizhou Hengfeng	2020	China League One	12	5	0	0	—		—		12	5
Guizhou Hengfeng	Total		33	21	0	0	—		—		33	21
Kayserispor	2020–21	Süper Lig	8	1	—		—		—		8	1
APOEL	2021–22	Cypriot First Division	20	5	5	1	—		—		25	6
APOEL	2022–23	Cypriot First Division	10	0	1	0	4	1	—		15	1
APOEL	Total		30	5	6	1	4	1	—		40	7
CFR Cluj	2022–23	Liga I	10	1	1	0	0	0	1 (Note: Appearance in Liga I European play-offs)	0	12	1
Career total			284	102	43	17	46	7	3	0	376	126

== Honours ==
NK Osijek

- Croatian Cup runner-up: 2011–12

Hajduk Split

- Croatian Cup: 2012–13

Apollon Limassol

- Cypriot Cup: 2015–16, 2016-17
- Cypriot Super Cup: 2016, 2017
