= Rúben Lima =

Portuguese footballer

Personal information
- Full name: Rúben Alexandre Rocha Lima
- Date of birth: 3 October 1989 (age 37)
- Place of birth: Lisbon, Portugal
- Height: 1.77 m (5 ft 10 in)
- Position: Left-back

Youth career
- 1997–1999: Tenente Valdez
- 1999–2000: Palmense
- 2000–2007: Benfica

Senior career*
Years	Team	Apps	(Gls)
2007–2010	Benfica	0	(0)
2007–2009	→ Aves (loan)	32	(1)
2009–2010	→ Vitória Setúbal (loan)	24	(0)
2010–2011	Beira-Mar	6	(0)
2011–2013	Hajduk Split	44	(0)
2013–2016	Dinamo Zagreb	16	(0)
2014	→ Rijeka (loan)	2	(0)
2014	Dinamo Zagreb B	6	(1)
2016–2017	União Madeira	39	(0)
2017–2019	Moreirense	53	(0)
2020–2021	B-SAD	44	(0)
2021–2024	Famalicão	25	(2)
2024–2025	Estrela Amadora	38	(0)

International career
2005–2006	Portugal U17	12	(0)
2006–2007	Portugal U18	8	(0)
2007–2008	Portugal U19	12	(1)
2008–2010	Portugal U21	13	(0)
- * Club domestic league appearances and goals as of 3 June 2025

Rúben Alexandre Rocha Lima (born 3 October 1989) is a Portuguese professional footballer who plays as a left-back.

== Club career ==
=== Portugal ===
A product of his hometown club Benfica's youth system, Lisbon-born Lima was promoted to the first team for the 2007–08 season. In January 2008, however, he and teammates Miguel Vítor and Romeu Ribeiro were loaned to Aves in the Segunda Liga, with the move being extended for the entirety of the following campaign.

Lima moved to Vitória de Setúbal for 2009–10, also on loan. He made his Primeira Liga debut on 17 August 2009, playing the full 90 minutes in a 0–0 home draw against Vitória de Guimarães. He appeared in 24 of the league's 30 games (22 starts), as the Sadinos barely avoided relegation.

After his contract with Benfica ended, Lima signed for Beira-Mar, recently returned to the top division.

=== Hajduk Split ===
In June 2011, Lima moved abroad for the first time in his career, joining Hajduk Split in the Croatian Football League. He quickly became first-choice at his new club.

Under the management of Krasimir Balakov, Lima was a first-team regular in the 2011–12 season. He made his debut in the UEFA Europa League on 28 July 2011, playing the full 90 minutes in a 1–0 away loss to Stoke City in the third qualifying round.

=== Dinamo Zagreb ===
On 24 July 2013, Lima signed a four-year contract with Hajduk Split's fierce rivals, Dinamo Zagreb, for an undisclosed fee. He spent the second part of the campaign on loan at Rijeka also in the Croatian top flight; additionally, he experienced economic problems at Dinamo and was demoted to their reserves.

=== Return to Portugal ===
Lima returned to Portugal and its main division on 27 January 2016, on a two-and-a-half-year deal at União da Madeira. He featured rarely in his first season under Luís Norton de Matos in an eventual relegation, but was an undisputed starter in the following for the third-placed side.

From 2017 to 2025, Lima played in the top tier, representing Moreirense, B-SAD, Famalicão and Estrela da Amadora. He scored his first goal in the competition on 9 January 2022 aged 32, as a member of the third of those clubs in a 2–2 away draw against Braga.

== International career ==
Lima earned 45 caps for Portugal at youth level. He made his debut for the under-21s on 14 October 2008, in a 1–0 friendly home loss to Ukraine in Vila Nova de Gaia.

== Career statistics ==
As of 1 June 2014

Club	Season	League		Cup		League Cup		Europe		Total	
Club	Season	Apps	Goals	Apps	Goals	Apps	Goals	Apps	Goals	Apps	Goals
Benfica	2007–08	0	0	0	0	0	0	-		0	0
Aves	2007–08	12	0	0	0	0	0	-		12	0
Aves	2008–09	20	1	3	1	2	0	-		25	2
Vitória Setúbal	2009–10	24	0	1	0	1	0	-		26	0
Beira-Mar	2010–11	6	0	3	0	1	0	-		10	0
Portugal		62	1	7	1	4	0	-		73	2
Hajduk Split	2011–12	23	0	4	0	-		2	0	29	0
Hajduk Split	2012–13	22	0	6	0	-		-		28	0
Hajduk Total		45	0	10	0	-		2	0	57	0
Dinamo Zagreb	2013–14	16	0	5	0	-		5	0	26	0
Career Total		123	1	22	1	4	0	7	0	130	2

== Honours ==
Hajduk Split

- Croatian Football Cup: 2012–13

Dinamo Zagreb

- Croatian Football League: 2013–14
