= Jean Evrard Kouassi =

Ivorian footballer (born 1994)

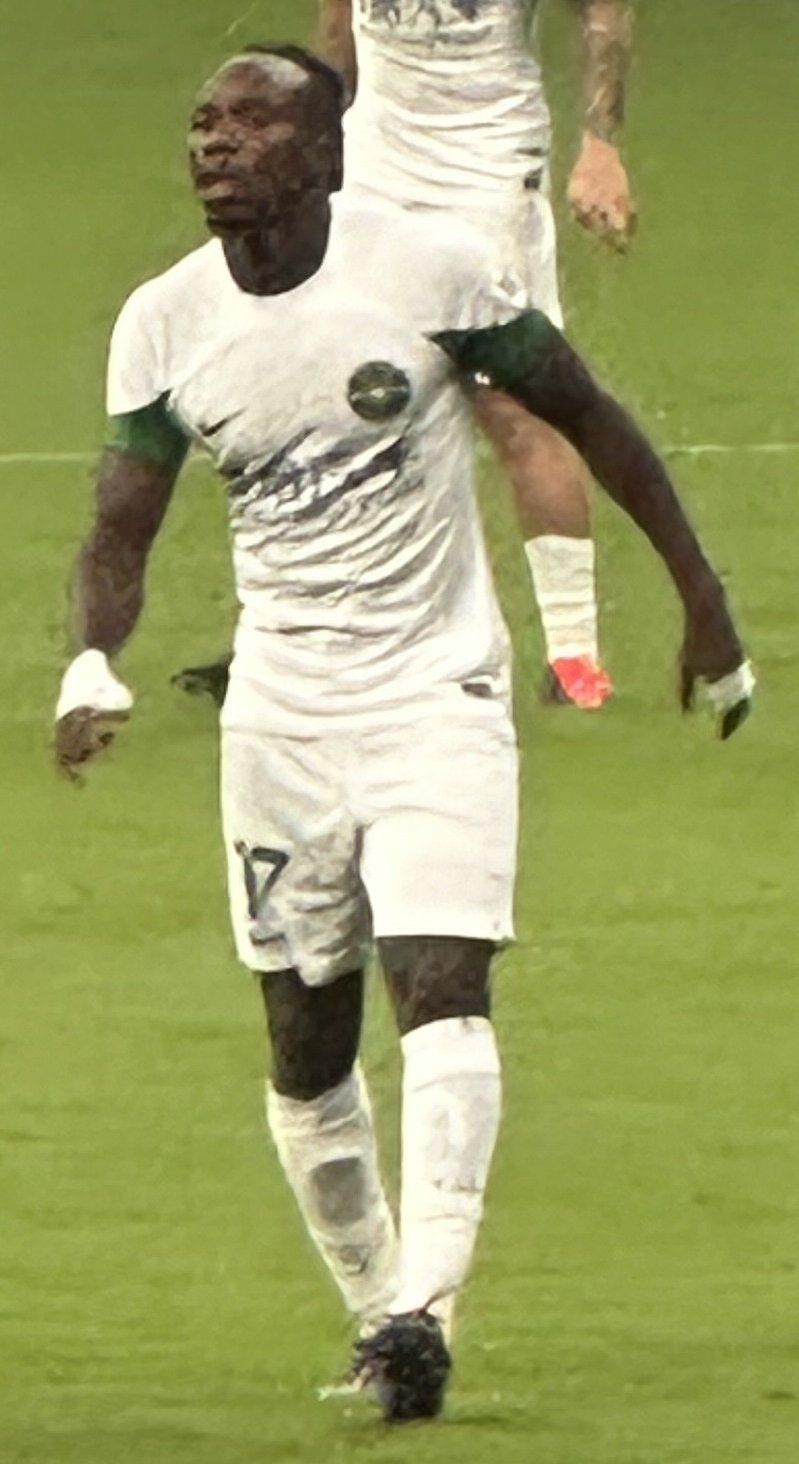
- Kouassi in August 2024

Personal information
- Date of birth: 25 September 1994 (age 32)
- Place of birth: N'Damien, Ivory Coast
- Height: 1.74 m (5 ft 9 in)
- Position: Winger

Team information
- Current team: Umm Salal
- Number: 17

Youth career
- 2004–2011: Jeunesse Sportive de Bassam
- 2011–2012: Moossou

Senior career*
Years	Team	Apps	(Gls)
2013–2015	Hajduk Split	59	(13)
2015–2016	Shanghai SIPG	45	(12)
2017–2021	Wuhan FC	103	(47)
2022–2023	Trabzonspor	16	(0)
2022–2023	→ Fatih Karagümrük (loan)	12	(3)
2023–2025	Zhejiang FC	55	(13)
2025-	Umm Salal	18	(3)

International career^{‡}
2011	Ivory Coast U17	7	(2)
2013	Ivory Coast U20	1	(1)
2021–	Ivory Coast	13	(1)
- * Club domestic league appearances and goals as of 27 April 2026 ‡ National team caps and goals as of 17 June 2023

Jean Evrard Kouassi (born 25 September 1994) is an Ivorian professional footballer who plays as a winger for Qatar Stars League club Umm Salal and Ivory Coast national team.

== Club career ==
=== Youth ===
Kouassi played for the Ivorian football club Moossou youth team before going abroad to have trials with TSG 1899 Hoffenheim, Club Brugge and Monaco before having a successful trial with Croatian club Hajduk Split who offered him a three-year contract in January 2013.

=== Hajduk Split ===
Kouassi made his debut for Hajduk Split in a league game against Slaven Belupo on 16 February 2013 that ended in a 2–0 victory. He gradually started to establish himself within the team and on 21 April 2013, Kouassi scored in a draw against Slaven Belupo, marking the 4000th jubilee championship goal for Hajduk Split. He further endeared himself towards the fans when he scored and assisted for a goal against Lokomotiva in the 2012–13 Croatian Cup final, which the club won 5–4 on aggregate.

=== Shanghai SIPG ===
Chinese Super League club Shanghai SIPG announced that Kouassi had joined the squad on 25 February 2015 and signed a contract until 2017. He made his debut in a league game on 7 March 2015 against Jiangsu Guoxin-Sainty in a league match that ended in a 2–1 victory. Kouassi scored his first goal for the club where he also registered an assist in a 2–1 win over Chongqing Lifan.

=== Wuhan Zall ===
On 18 January 2017, Kouassi moved to second tier China League One side Wuhan Zall. On 18 June 2017, he scored his first goal against Dalian Transcendence. He helped the club earn promotion to the 2019 Chinese Super League by winning the 2018 China League One title, forming a strong strike partnership with Rafael Silva and netting 15 league goals.

=== Trabzonspor ===
On 10 December 2021, Kouassi joined Turkish Süper Lig side Trabzonspor on a three-and-a-half-year contract. He scored on his debut for the club on 9 February 2022 during the 2021–22 Turkish Cup where he scored the winner in a 2–1 win against Denizlispor which send the team to the quarter-finals. Kouassi also helped the club to win the 2021–22 Süper Lig title. He also help Trabzonspor to win the 2022 Turkish Super Cup after thrashing Sivasspor 4–0 on 30 July.

==== Fatih Karagümrük (loan) ====
On 6 September 2022, he was loaned to Fatih Karagümrük. He scored his first goal for the club in a 5–4 lost to Fenerbahçe on 9 October.

=== Zhejiang Professional ===
On 22 January 2023, Kouassi returned to China to join top-tier club Zhejiang Professional signing a deal until 2025. He make his debut for the club on 15 April in a 2–0 lost to Changchun Yatai. Kouassi scored his first league goal on 2 June in a 3–0 win over Shenzhen. He make his AFC Champions League debut on 20 September in a 4–1 away lost to Thailand club Buriram United.

In a league match against Tianjin Jinmen Tiger on 19 April 2024, Kouassi recorded a brace of assist helping his team defeat their opponent 3–2. He then recorded another brace of assist on 30 April in a 4–1 win over Henan. During the 2024–25 AFC Champions League Two group stage match against Indonesian club Persib Bandung on 3 October at home, he scored the only goal in the match which help his team to gain 3 points in the group.

== International career ==
=== Youth ===
Kouassi was named in the Ivorian squad for the 2011 African U-17 Championship. He scored in the game against Gambia on 15 January 2011. He was also named in the Ivorian squad for the 2011 FIFA U-17 World Cup. He played in all four games before the Ivorians were eliminated from the competition by France in the round of 16.

=== Senior ===
He made his debut for Ivory Coast national team on 30 March 2021 in a 2021 Africa Cup of Nations qualifier against Ethiopia and scored his team's third goal in a 3–1 victory.

== Career statistics ==
As of match played 27 April 2026

Appearances and goals by club, season and competition
Club	Season	League			National cup (Note: Includes Croatian Cup, Chinese FA Cup, Turkish Cup, Amir of Qatar Cup)		Continental		Other		Total	
Club	Season	Division	Apps	Goals	Apps	Goals	Apps	Goals	Apps	Goals	Apps	Goals
Hajduk Split	2012–13	Prva HNL	13	2	4	1	0	0	—		17	3
Hajduk Split	2013–14	Prva HNL	30	5	4	2	2	0	1 (Note: Appearance in Croatian Football Super Cup)	0	37	7
Hajduk Split	2014–15	Prva HNL	16	6	2	1	6	1	—		0	0
Hajduk Split	Total		59	13	10	4	8	1	1	0	78	18
Shanghai SIPG	2015	Chinese Super League	18	4	1	0	—		—		22	0
Shanghai SIPG	2016	Chinese Super League	27	8	2	0	0	0	—		29	8
Shanghai SIPG	Total		45	12	3	0	0	0	—		48	12
Wuhan Zall	2017	China League One	23	7	0	0	—		—		23	7
Wuhan Zall	2018	China League One	26	15	0	0	—		—		26	15
Wuhan Zall	2019	Chinese Super League	23	12	0	0	—		—		23	12
Wuhan Zall	2020	Chinese Super League	18	8	0	0	—		2 (Note: Appearances in Promotion/Relegation Play-offs)	1	20	9
Wuhan Zall	2021	Chinese Super League	13	5	0	0	—		—		13	5
Wuhan Zall	Total		103	47	0	0	—		2	1	105	48
Trabzonspor	2021–22	Süper Lig	11	0	3	1	—		—		14	1
Trabzonspor	2022–23	Süper Lig	5	0	—		2 (Note: Appearances in UEFA Champions League)	0	1 (Note: Appearance in Turkish Super Cup)	0	8	0
Trabzonspor	Total		16	0	3	1	2	0	1	0	22	1
Fatih Karagümrük (loan)	2022–23	Süper Lig	12	3	1	1	—		—		13	4
Zhejiang FC	2023	Chinese Super League	22	6	0	0	7 (Note: Appearances in AFC Champions League)	0	—		29	6
Zhejiang FC	2024	Chinese Super League	26	6	1	0	6 (Note: Appearances in AFC Champions League Two)	4	—		33	10
Zhejiang FC	2025	Chinese Super League	7	1	—		—		—		7	1
Zhejiang FC	Total		55	13	1	0	13	4	—		69	17
Umm Salal	2025–26	Qatar Stars League	18	3	2	0	—		11 (Note: Appearances in Qatari Stars Cup)	4	31	7
Career total			308	91	20	6	23	5	15	5	366	107

== Honours ==
Hajduk Split

- Croatian Cup: 2012–13

Wuhan Zall

- China League One: 2018

Trabzonspor

- Süper Lig: 2021–22
- Turkish Super Cup: 2022
