= Ivan Vuković (footballer) =

Montenegrin footballer

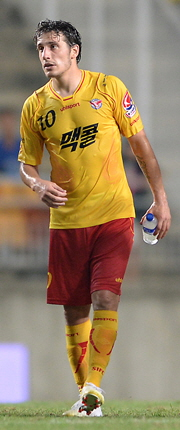
- Vuković in 2013

Personal information
- Date of birth: 9 February 1987 (age 39)
- Place of birth: Titograd, SR Montenegro, SFR Yugoslavia
- Height: 1.79 m (5 ft 10 1/2 in)
- Position: Forward

Senior career*
Years	Team	Apps	(Gls)
2004–2006	Zeta	56	(15)
2006–2011	Budućnost Podgorica	104	(56)
2011–2013	Hajduk Split	49	(11)
2013–2014	Seongnam	11	(3)
2014	OFK Beograd	8	(1)
2015	Mladost Podgorica	15	(7)
2015	Maccabi Netanya	0	(0)
2016	Mladost Podgorica	16	(4)
2016–2017	Lovćen	14	(0)
2017	Rabotnički	17	(2)
2017–2018	Grbalj	36	(11)
2018–2019	Krabi	17	(8)
2019	Grbalj	15	(3)
2019–2022	Iskra Danilovgrad	34	(7)

International career
2009	Montenegro	1	(0)
- * Club domestic league appearances and goals as of 24 October 2020

Ivan Vuković (Montenegrin Cyrillic: Иван Вуковић, born 9 February 1987) is a retired Montenegrin football forward who was last played for FK Iskra Danilovgrad. He is best known for his abilities as a striker but can also play as a supporting striker.

== Club career ==
Vuković began his professional career at Montenegrin side FK Zeta signing for the club in 2003. During his second season at the club, Zeta had possibly the best season in their history. Zeta finished the 2004–05 season in third place in the First League of Serbia and Montenegro, just behind Belgrade powerhouses FK Partizan and Red Star Belgrade with Ivan leading the attack all season.

=== Budućnost ===
In 2006, Vuković moved to FK Budućnost Podgorica. Here he spent five season leading the club to four second places and one first place in the Montenegrin First Division. He scored 57 goals in 103 official appearances for the club. His last two seasons at the club (the 2009–10 and 2010–11 seasons) were particularly successful, scoring 39 goals in 60 appearances. He was awarded by the Football Association of Montenegro the recognition of "Footballer of the Year" in all domestic Montenegrin competition.

=== Hajduk Split ===
Due to his fine long term form, Croatian giants HNK Hajduk Split signed him from the club in the summer of 2011 for a reported fee of €425,000. On August 9, 2012, in the 2012-13 UEFA Europa League third qualifying round, he scored a remarkable goal against Internazionale.

=== Seongnam ===
In June 2013 he signed for Seongnam for a reported fee of €220,000 from Hajduk Split.

=== Mladost ===
In August 2014 he returned to Europe and joined Serbian top-flight side OFK Beograd. Same year he was transferred to Mladost Podgorica. He scored deciding goal against Neftchi which took Mladost to the second qualifying round of UEFA League Europa 2015.

=== Maccabi Netanya ===
In August 2015 Vuković signed a new contract for the Israeli club Maccabi Netanya penning one-year contract with option for two, but was released from the club after less than a month.

=== Back to Mladost ===
Upon return from Israel, Vuković trained with his previous club, Mladost. In the second half of the 2015–16 season, he officially signed a new contract with Mladost. In 2015–16 UEFA Europa League qualifiers, he scored decisive goal against Neftchi Baku which advanced Mladost to next round. Mladost became Montenegrin champions of 2015–16 season. After the season, Vuković have decided not to renew a contract.

== International career ==
Vuković was previously a part of the Montenegrin national youth teams before advancing to the senior national team. His senior debut for Montenegro came on November 18, 2009 when he came in as a substitute for Milorad Peković in a friendly match against Belarus. It remained his sole international appearance.
