= 2012–13 Croatian Football Cup =

Tournament details
- Country: Croatia
- Teams: 48

Final positions
- Champions: Hajduk Split (6th title)
- Runners-up: Lokomotiva

Tournament statistics
- Matches played: 50
- Goals scored: 162 (3.24 per match)
- Top goal scorer: Mario Šitum (7)

The 2012–13 Croatian Football Cup was the twenty-second season of Croatia's football knockout competition. The defending champions were Dinamo Zagreb, having won their 12th title the previous year by defeating Osijek in the final.

The cup kicked off with the single-legged preliminary round which was scheduled on 29 August 2012. Most of the top flight clubs entered the competition in the following round, scheduled on 26 September 2012, with the exception of Lokomotiva, RNK Split and Zadar, as their cup coefficient (determined by their cup record over the last five seasons) was too low to skip the preliminary round.

== Calendar ==
Round	Date(s)	Number of fixtures	Clubs	New entries this round
Preliminary round	29 August 2012	16	48 → 32	none
First round	26 September 2012	16	32 → 16	16
Second round	31 October 2012	8	16 → 8	none
Quarter-finals	21 and 28 November 2012	8	8 → 4	none
Semi-finals	3 and 17 April 2013	4	4 → 2	none
Final	8 and 22 May 2013	2	2 → 1	none

== Preliminary round ==
The draw for the preliminary round was held on 1 August 2012 with matches scheduled on 29 August 2012. This round consists of 16 single-legged fixtures. A total of 32 clubs entered the preliminary round: 21 regional cup winners organized at the county level and 11 regional cup finalists (from the top 11 counties with the greatest number of registered football clubs).

Tie no	Home team	Score	Away team
1	Koprivnica	0–0 (5–4 p)	Vuteks Sloga
2	Virovitica	1–4	RNK Split
3	Krka Lozovac	bye	Nedelišće
4	Libertas	2–1	Mladost Ždralovi
5	Slunj	2–1	Zadrugar
6	Tekstilac Ravnice	1–1 (4–5 p)	Višnjevac
7	Ivančica	2–2 (4–3 p)	Oriolik Oriovac
8	Mladost Repušnica	1–2	Zrinski Tordinci
9	Gorica	4–0	Sloboda Slakovec
10	Bjelovar	1–2	Vinodol
11	Lokomotiva	7–0	Slavija Pleternica
12	Novalja	3–1	Zagorec Krapina
13	Zelina	9–0	Mladost Mali Otok
14	Zadar	5–1	Belišće
15	GOŠK Dubrovnik	bye	Jedinstvo Omladinac
16^{*}	Vrsar	5–0	Tomislav-Pan

* Match played on 28 August.

== First round ==
First round proper consisted of 16 single-legged matches, with 16 winners of the preliminary round joined by 16 clubs with the highest cup coefficients (including remaining nine top level clubs). The draw for the first round was held on 30 August, where the club with the lowest cup coefficient hosts the one with the highest and so on. Matches are scheduled on 26 September 2012.

Tie no	Home team	Score	Away team
1^{*}	Vrsar	0–3	Dinamo Zagreb
2	Slunj	0–4	Hajduk Split
3	Libertas	bye	Varaždin
4	Zrinski Tordinci	0–4	NK Zagreb
5	Vinodol	0–2	Cibalia
6	Novalja	0–1	Osijek
7	Ivančica	1–2	Slaven Belupo
8	GOŠK Dubrovnik	1–1 (3–2 p)	Šibenik
9	Nedelišće	1–0 (aet)	Rijeka
10	Koprivnica	2–1 (aet)	Pomorac
11	Višnjevac	1–2	Istra 1961
12^{*}	Gorica	3–0	Inter Zaprešić
13	Zelina	bye	Karlovac
14^{*}	Lokomotiva	4–2	Segesta
15	RNK Split	5–1	Zagora Unešić
16	Zadar	2–0	Konavljanin

* Match played on 25 September

== Second round ==
The second round was contested by 16 winners from the first round, over eight single-legged fixtures played on 31 October 2012. It was the last stage of the competition employing the single-leg format, as from the quarter-finals onward all fixtures were double-legged events.

Tie no	Home team	Score	Away team
1^{*}	Dinamo Zagreb	2–3 (a.e.t.)	Zadar
2	Hajduk Split	2–1	RNK Split
3^{*}	Lokomotiva	3–2	Libertas
4^{*}	NK Zagreb	1–2	Zelina
5	Cibalia	1–0	Gorica
6^{*}	Osijek	3–2 (a.e.t.)	Istra 1961
7^{*}	Slaven Belupo	2–0 (a.e.t.)	Koprivnica
8	GOŠK Dubrovnik	2–0 (a.e.t.)	Nedelišće

* Match played on 30 October

== Quarter-finals ==
The eight clubs remaining in the competition after the second round were paired for the quarter-finals. From the quarter-finals onwards the ties will be played in a two-legged format. The draw was held on 7 November 2012.

Team 1	Agg.	Team 2	1st leg	2nd leg
Zadar	2–3	Slaven Belupo	1–0	1–3
Zelina	1–3	Hajduk Split	1–1	0–2
GOŠK Dubrovnik	0–1	Lokomotiva	0–1	0–0
Cibalia	4–2	Osijek	1–1	3–1

== Semi-finals ==
3 April 2013
19:00

Cibalia	1–1	Lokomotiva
Mazalović 23'	Report (in Croatian)	Kramarić 58'

Stadion HNK Cibalia, Vinkovci
Attendance: 1,000
Referee: Marko Matoc (Zaprešić)
17 April 2013
19:00

Lokomotiva	3–0	Cibalia
Šitum 19'; Antolić 43'; Kramarić 89'	Report (in Croatian)

Stadion Maksimir, Zagreb
Attendance: 1,500
Referee: Zlatko Šimčić (Koprivnica)

Lokomotiva won 4–1 on aggregate

10 April 2013 (Note: Slaven Belupo v Hajduk was originally to be played on 3 April 2013, 19:00 local time, but was postponed to the next week, due to poor conditions.)
17:00

Slaven Belupo	1–2	Hajduk Split
Vugrinec 77'	Report (in Croatian)	Sušić 56'; Stojanović 90+2'

Gradski stadion, Koprivnica
Attendance: 1,500
Referee: Damir Batinić (Osijek)
17 April 2013
19:00

Hajduk Split	1–1	Slaven Belupo
Milić 72'	Report (in Croatian)	Glavica 32'

Stadion Poljud, Split
Attendance: 16,000
Referee: Igor Pristovnik (Zagreb)

Hajduk Split won 3–2 on aggregate

== Final ==
=== First leg ===
8 May 2013
19:30

Hajduk Split	2–1	Lokomotiva
Maglica 65'; Kouassi 69'	Report (in Croatian)	Antolić 53'

Stadion Poljud, Split
Attendance: 20,000
Referee: Andrej Burilo (Osijek)

=== Second leg ===
22 May 2013
20:15

Lokomotiva	3–3	Hajduk Split
Šitum 8'; Kramarić 70'; Bručić 90+3'	Report	Vuković 44'; Sušić 50'; Stojanović 72'

Stadion Maksimir, Zagreb
Attendance: 12,000
Referee: Ante Vučemilović (Osijek)

Hajduk Split won 5–4 on aggregate

== See also ==
- 2012–13 Croatian First Football League
- 2012–13 Croatian Second Football League
