= 2013–14 HNK Hajduk Split season =

Hajduk Split
2013–14 season
- Chairman: Marin Brbić
- Manager: Igor Tudor
- Prva HNL: 3rd
- Croatian Cup: Quarter-final
- Europa League: Third qualifying round
- Croatian Supercup: Runners-up
- Top goalscorer: League: Anton Maglica (12); All: Anton Maglica (12)
- Highest home attendance: 28,000 vs Dinamo Zagreb (14 September 2013)
- Lowest home attendance: 0 vs Turnovo (18 July 2013)
- Average home league attendance: 10,139
Home colours	Away colours

The 2013–14 season was the 103rd season in Hajduk Split's history and their twenty-third in the Prva HNL. Their 4th-place finish in the 2012–13 season means it is their 23rd successive season playing in the Prva HNL.

== First-team squad ==
As of 12 April 2014

Note: Flags indicate national team as defined under FIFA eligibility rules; some limited exceptions apply. Players may hold more than one non-FIFA nationality.

No.	Pos.	Nation	Player
1	GK	CRO	Fabjan Tomić
2	DF	CRO	Dino Mikanović
4	DF	CRO	Antonio Milić
5	DF	CRO	Goran Milović
6	DF	BIH	Avdija Vršajević
7	MF	CRO	Mislav Anđelković
8	MF	CRO	Mario Pašalić
9	FW	CRO	Anton Maglica
10	MF	CRO	Franko Andrijašević
11	MF	BIH	Ismar Hairlahović
14	DF	CRO	Ivan Anton Vasilj
15	FW	UZB	Temurkhuja Abdukholiqov
16	MF	CRO	Andrija Balić
17	DF	CRO	Goran Jozinović (vice captain)
18	MF	CRO	Mijo Caktaš

No.	Pos.	Nation	Player
19	FW	ALB	Elvir Maloku
20	FW	CRO	Ivan Tomičić
22	DF	CRO	Mario Maloča (captain)
23	DF	CRO	Zoran Nižić
24	FW	ALB	Arlind Basha
25	GK	CRO	Dante Stipica
28	MF	CRO	Filip Bradarić
30	MF	CRO	Josip Bašić
31	MF	BIH	Tino-Sven Sušić
32	MF	CRO	Marko Bencun
35	DF	CRO	Luka Lučić
77	FW	CIV	Jean Evrard Kouassi
91	GK	CRO	Lovre Kalinić
—	GK	CRO	Ivo Grbić

== Competitions ==
=== Overall record ===
Performance by competition
Competition	Starting round	Final position/round	First match	Last match
Prva HNL	—N/a	3rd	13 July 2013	17 May 2014
Croatian Football Cup	First round	Quarter-final	1 October 2013	18 December 2013
Super Cup	—N/a	Runners-up	6 July 2013	
UEFA Europa League	Second qualifying round	Third qualifying round	18 July 2013	8 August 2013

Statistics by competition
Competition	Pld	W	D	L	GF	GA	GD	Win%
Prva HNL	36	17	11	8	58	44	+14	47.22
Croatian Football Cup	4	2	0	2	8	10	−2	50.00
Super Cup	1	0	1	0	1	1	+0	0.00
UEFA Europa League	4	1	1	2	3	3	+0	25.00
Total	45	20	13	12	70	58	+12	44.44

=== Prva HNL ===
==== Classification ====
Pos	Team	Pld	W	D	L	GF	GA	GD	Pts	Qualification or relegation
1	Dinamo Zagreb (C)	36	26	6	4	83	26	+57	84	Qualification to Champions League second qualifying round
2	Rijeka	36	21	10	5	72	35	+37	73	Qualification to Europa League second qualifying round
3	Hajduk Split	36	17	11	8	58	44	+14	62	Qualification to Europa League second qualifying round
4	RNK Split	36	14	10	12	41	41	0	52	Qualification to Europa League first qualifying round
5	Lokomotiva	36	15	7	14	57	59	−2	52	

Source: Sportnet.hr
Rules for classification: 1) points; 2) goal difference; 3) number of goals scored.
For deciding champions, qualification to UEFA Europa League and relegation: 1st points; 2nd head-to-head points; 3rd head-to-head goal difference; 4th head-to-head away goals scored
(C) Champions

==== Results summary ====
Overall								Home						Away					
Pld	W	D	L	GF	GA	GD	Pts	W	D	L	GF	GA	GD	W	D	L	GF	GA	GD
35	17	11	7	58	39	+19	62	11	4	2	28	13	+15	6	7	5	30	26	+4

Last updated: 17 May 2014.
Source: Sportnet.hr

==== Results by round ====
Round	1	2	3	4	5	6	7	8	9	10	11	12	13	14	15	16	17	18	19	20	21	22	23	24	25	26	27	28	29	30	31	32	33	34	35	36
Ground	A	H	A	H	A	H	A	A	H	H	A	H	A	H	A	H	H	A	A	H	A	H	A	H	A	A	H	H	A	H	A	H	A	H	H	A
Result	W	D	W	W	W	W	L	L	W	W	D	D	W	W	D	W	D	D	D	D	W	W	W	W	D	D	L	W	L	W	L	D	L	L	W	L
Position	1	3	2	2	1	1	2	3	2	3	3	2	1	1	2	2	3	3	3	3	2	2	2	2	2	2	3	3	3	3	3	3	3	3	3	3

Source: Competitive matches
A = Away; H = Home; W = Win; D = Draw; L = Loss

==== Results by opponent ====
Team	Results				Points
Team	1	2	3	4	Points
Dinamo Zagreb	2–0	2–2	0–2	0–3	4
H. Dragovoljac	2–1	2–1	2–1	1–4	9
Istra 1961	0–1	2–0	1–1	0–1	4
Lokomotiva	3–1	3–1	2–0	2–2	10
Osijek	0–1	1–1	1–1	4–2	5
Rijeka	1–1	1–1	2–2	1–4	3
Slaven Belupo	1–0	3–3	3–0	0–3	7
RNK Split	3–0	0–0	2–1	1–0	10
Zadar	5–1	1–0	1–1	3–1	10

Source: 2013–14 Croatian First Football League article

== Matches ==
=== Friendlies ===
==== Pre-season ====
Match	Date	Venue	Opponent	Score	Attendance	Hajduk Scorers	Report
1	21 Jun	N (Slovenia)	Rudar Velenje (Slovenia)	3–0	–	Milović, Kiš (2)	hajduk.hr
2	25 Jun	N (Slovenia)	Petrolul (Romania)	1–0	–	Kouassi	hajduk.hr
3	26 Jun	N (Slovenia)	Karpaty Lviv (Ukraine)	2–1	–	Kiš (2)	hajduk.hr
4	30 Jun	N (Slovenia)	Lokomotiv Moscow (Russia)	2–2	–	Kiš, Lobantsev (o.g.)	hajduk.hr
5	30 Jun	A (Slovenia)	Zavrč (Slovenia)	2–1	1,500	Milović, Mujan	hajduk.hr
6	8 Jul	H	Vitez (Bosnia and Herzegovina)	2–2	–	Bencun, Tomičić	hajduk.hr

==== On-season ====
Match	Date	Venue	Opponent	Score	Attendance	Hajduk Scorers	Report
1	1 Sep	A	Đakovo Croatia	3–2	–	Kiš (2), Nloga	hajduk.hr
2	7 Sep	A	Dinara	1–1	1,500	Kiš	hajduk.hr
3	10 Oct	H	Beşiktaş (Turkey)	1–2	10,000	Kouassi	Sportnet.hr
4	12 Oct	A	Polača	2–2	1,500	Milić, Bencun	hajduk.hr
5	18 Feb	H	Udinese (Italy)	3–0	7,000	Bradarić, Andrijašević, Tomičić	Sportnet.hr
6	17 Mar	A	Vukovar 1991	1–2	2,000	Balić	hajduk.hr

==== Mid-season ====
Match	Date	Venue	Opponent	Score	Attendance	Hajduk Scorers	Report
1	22 Jan	N (Turkey)	Sandhausen (Germany)	1–3	–	Bašić	hajduk.hr
2	25 Jan	N (Turkey)	Gyeongnam (South Korea)	2–3	50	Kouassi, Maglica	hajduk.hr
3	27 Jan	N (Turkey)	Sturm Graz (Austria)	2–0	–	Basha, Tomičić	hajduk.hr
4	31 Jan	N (Turkey)	Dinamo Tbilisi (Georgia (country))	2–1	–	Kouassi (2)	hajduk.hr

=== Croatian Football Super Cup ===
6 July 2013 Final	Dinamo Zagreb	1–1 (4–1 p)	Hajduk Split	Zagreb
20:30 CEST (UTC+02:00)	Čop 34'; Addy (yellow card) 57'	Report	Jozinović (yellow card) 26'; Caktaš 76' (pen.)	Stadium: Stadion Maksimir; Attendance: 13,000; Referee: Ante Vučemilović-Šimunović (Osijek)
	Penalties
	Šimunić (penalty scored); Čop (penalty scored); Halilović (penalty scored); Antolić (penalty scored)		(penalty scored) Vršajević; (penalty missed) Jozinović; (penalty missed) Tomičić

Source: HRnogomet.com

=== Prva HNL ===
13 July 2013 1	Zadar	1–5	Hajduk Split	Zadar
21:00 CEST (UTC+02:00)	Jerbić (yellow card) 32' (yellow-red card) 59'; Terkeš 45' (yellow card) 48'; Con (yellow card) 55'; Prahić (yellow card) 82'; Surać (yellow card) 88'	Report	Kiš 26', 34' (yellow card) 32'; Jozinović (yellow card) 45'; Kouassi 58'; Pašalić 75'; Bencun 85'; Vršajević (yellow card) 88'	Stadium: Stadion Stanovi; Attendance: 4,000; Referee: Marijo Strahonja (Zagreb)

21 July 2013 2	Hajduk Split	1–1	Rijeka	Split
19:00 CEST (UTC+02:00)	Maglica 28'; Mikanović (yellow card) 53'; Maloča (yellow card) 72'	Report	Benko (yellow card) 11'; Škarabot (yellow card) 45'; Brezovec (yellow card) 55'; Maleš (yellow card) 60'; Kvržić 79'	Stadium: Stadion Poljud; Attendance: 20,000; Referee: Domagoj Ljubičić (Osijek)

28 July 2013 3	RNK Split	0–3	Hajduk Split	Split
21:00 CEST (UTC+02:00)	Glumac (yellow card) 16'; Dujmović (yellow card) 19'; Vojnović (yellow card) 60'; Mršić (yellow card) 69'	Report	Caktaš 17' (pen.); Glumac 30' (o.g.); Maglica 49'	Stadium: Stadion Park Mladeži; Attendance: 5,000; Referee: Goran Gabrilo (Split)

4 August 2013 4	Hajduk Split	2–1	Hrvatski Dragovoljac	Split
21:00 CEST (UTC+02:00)	Andrijašević 19', 65'; Milović (yellow card) 70'	Report	Špehar (yellow card) 3'; Jajčinović (yellow card) 58'; Zlatar 75'	Stadium: Stadion Poljud; Attendance: 9,000; Referee: Marin Vidulin (Kanfanar)

18 August 2013 6	Hajduk Split	1–0	Slaven Belupo	Split
19:00 CEST (UTC+02:00)	Maglica 77'	Report		Stadium: Stadion Poljud; Attendance: 10,000; Referee: Damir Batinić (Osijek)

24 August 2013 7	Istra 1961	1–0	Hajduk Split	Pula
21:00 CEST (UTC+02:00)	Jô 20'; Čagalj (yellow card) 50' (yellow-red card) 79'; Woon (yellow card) 66'; Blagojević (yellow card) 75'	Report	Sušić (yellow card) 35'; Vršajević (yellow card) 49'; Maloča (yellow card) 52'; Kiš (yellow card) 90' (yellow-red card) 90+2'	Stadium: Stadion Aldo Drosina; Attendance: 5,500; Referee: Danijel Trampus (Osijek)

28 August 2013 5	Lokomotiva	1–3	Hajduk Split	Zagreb
21:00 CEST (UTC+02:00)	Chago (yellow card) 20'; Mrzljak (yellow card) 43'; Bručić (yellow card) 56'; P. Mišić 58'; Matas (yellow card) 76'	Report	Sušić (yellow card) 35'; Andrijašević 23' (pen.), 69'; Vršajević (yellow card) 26'; Maloča (yellow card) 33'; Jozinović (yellow card) 65'; Maglica 69'	Stadium: Stadion Maksimir; Attendance: 1,000; Referee: Marko Matoc (Zaprešić)

31 August 2013 8	Osijek	1–0	Hajduk Split	Osijek
19:00 CEST (UTC+02:00)	Lulić (yellow card) 24'; Mišić (yellow card) 27'; Pušić (yellow card) 48'; Novaković 90+1' (yellow card) 90+1'	Report	Andrijašević (yellow card) 45'; Maloku (yellow card) 69'; Lučić (yellow card) 87'	Stadium: Stadion Gradski vrt Attendance: 2,800; Referee: Igor Pristovnik (Zagreb)

14 September 2013 9	Hajduk Split	2–0	Dinamo Zagreb	Split
19:00 CEST (UTC+02:00)	Jozinović (yellow card) 40'; Pašalić 49', 69'; Milović (yellow card) 61'; Maglica (yellow card) 74'	Report	Sammir (yellow card) 9'; Rúben Lima (yellow card) 90+3'	Stadium: Stadion Poljud; Attendance: 28,000; Referee: Tihomir Pejin (Donji Miholjac)

21 September 2013 10	Hajduk Split	1–0	Zadar	Split
19:00 CEST (UTC+02:00)	Iluridze 9'; Milić (yellow card) 81'	Report	Hrgović (yellow card) 9'; Jerbić (yellow card) 32'; Sarić (yellow card) 42'; Con (yellow card) 52'	Stadium: Stadion Poljud; Attendance: 8,000; Referee: Marin Vidulin (Kanfanar)

28 September 2013 11	Rijeka	1–1	Hajduk Split	Rijeka
19:00 CEST (UTC+02:00)	Benko 25'; Krstanović (yellow card) 90+2'	Report	Kouassi 58' (yellow card) 90'; Sušić (yellow card) 90'; Jozinović (yellow card) 90+3'	Stadium: Stadion Kantrida; Attendance: 9,000; Referee: Ante Vučemilović-Šimunović (Osijek)

5 October 2013 12	Hajduk Split	0–0	RNK Split	Split
19:00 CEST (UTC+02:00)	Maloča (yellow card) 22'; Maglica (yellow card) 27'; Milović (yellow card) 85'	Report	Rugašević (yellow card) 22'; Glumac (yellow card) 30'; Vojnović (yellow card) 30'; Erceg (yellow card) 68'; Pehar (yellow card) 89'	Stadium: Stadion Poljud; Attendance: 7,000; Referee: Fran Jović (Zagreb)

20 October 2013 13	Hrvatski Dragovoljac	1–2	Hajduk Split	Zagreb
19:00 CEST (UTC+02:00)	Kluk (yellow card) 21'; Mršić (yellow card) 33'; Sivonjić 40'; Komorski (yellow card) 68'	Report	Bukva (yellow card) 39'; Bencun 59', 90+2' (yellow card) 59'	Stadium: Stadion Kranjčevićeva; Attendance: 4,500; Referee: Zlatko Šimčić (Koprivnica)

26 October 2013 14	Hajduk Split	3–1	Lokomotiva	Split
19:00 CEST (UTC+02:00)	Milović (yellow card) 26'; Bencun 38', 87'; Maglica (yellow card) 88'; Pašalić 90+4'	Report	Puljić (yellow card) 30'; Chago (yellow card) 57'; Pjaca 90+1'	Stadium: Stadion Poljud; Attendance: 18,000; Referee: Bruno Marić (Daruvar)

3 November 2013 15	Slaven Belupo	3–3	Hajduk Split	Koprivnica
15:00 CET (UTC+01:00)	Rak (yellow card) 28'; Fuštar (yellow card) 41'; Matoš 45'; Brlek 48'; Edson 66'; Ozobić (yellow card) 79'	Report	Pašalić (yellow card) 8' (goal) 34'; Vršajević (yellow card) 45'; Kouassi (yellow card) 57'; Sušić 76'; Bašić 90+1'	Stadium: Gradski stadion Attendance: 3,200; Referee: Marko Matoc (Zaprešić)

9 November 2013 16	Hajduk Split	2–0	Istra 1961	Split
19:00 CET (UTC+01:00)	Pašalić 13' (yellow card) 73'; Kouassi 37'; Bradarić (yellow card) 39'; Andrijašević (yellow card) 90'	Report	Jô (yellow card) 28'	Stadium: Stadion Poljud; Attendance: 16,000; Referee: Igor Pristovnik (Zagreb)

24 November 2013 17	Hajduk Split	1–1	Osijek	Split
19:00 CET (UTC+01:00)	Vršajević 23'; Kiš (yellow card) 90'	Report	J. Barišić 31'	Stadium: Stadion Poljud; Attendance: 8,000; Referee: Ivan Bebek (Rijeka)

1 December 2013 18	Dinamo Zagreb	2–2	Hajduk Split	Zagreb
15:00 CET (UTC+02:00)	Soudani 27'; Rúben Lima (yellow card) 28'; Čop 54'; Leko (yellow card) 76'	Report	Kouassi 10'; Bradarić (yellow card) 51'; Milović (yellow card) 64'; Jozinović (yellow card) 70'; Maglica 90+1'	Stadium: Stadion Maksimir; Attendance: 9,950; Referee: Domagoj Ljubičić (Osijek)

9 December 2013 19	Zadar	1–1	Hajduk Split	Zadar
18:00 CET (UTC+01:00)	Neretljak (yellow card) 27'; Jerbić (yellow card) 45'; Ivančić (yellow card) 45+5'; Šimurina (yellow card) 48'; Hrgović (yellow card) 58' (goal) 76'; Sarić (yellow card) 62'	Report	Mikanović 4' (yellow card) 45+3'; Iluridze (yellow card) 24'; Milić (yellow card) 27'; Bašić (yellow card) 53'; Pašalić (yellow card) 54'; Sušić (yellow card) 73'; Maloča (yellow card) 85'	Stadium: Stadion Stanovi; Attendance: 4,000; Referee: Ivo Krečak (Šibenik)

15 December 2013 20	Hajduk Split	2–2	Rijeka	Split
19:00 CET (UTC+01:00)	Bradarić 76' (pen.); Maloča 90+1' (pen.)	Report	Benko 7'; Sharbini (yellow card) 18'; A. Kramarić 41'; Marić (yellow card) 51'; Maleš (yellow card) 59' (yellow-red card) 90+1'	Stadium: Stadion Poljud; Attendance: 8,000; Referee: Fran Jović (Zagreb)

8 February 2014 21	RNK Split	1–2	Hajduk Split	Split
17:00 CET (UTC+01:00)	Vojnović (yellow card) 36'; De. Glavina (yellow card) 36' (goal) 73'; Erceg (yellow card) 62' (penalty missed) 64'; Dujmović (yellow card) 19'; Mršić (yellow card) 69'	Report	Pašalić (yellow card) 14' (goal) 83', 88'; Sušić (yellow card) 29'; Bradarić (yellow card) 64'; Vršajević (yellow card) 72'	Stadium: Stadion Park Mladeži; Attendance: 2,500; Referee: Ivan Bebek (Rijeka)

14 February 2014 22	Hajduk Split	2–1	Hrvatski Dragovoljac	Split
18:00 CET (UTC+01:00)	Pašalić 46' (yellow card) 88'; Milić 61'	Report	Zlatar (yellow card) 75'; Mrčela 90+3'	Stadium: Stadion Poljud; Attendance: 6,000; Referee: Domagoj Vučkov (Rijeka)

22 February 2014 23	Lokomotiva	0–2	Hajduk Split	Zagreb
17:00 CET (UTC+01:00)	Barbarić (yellow card) 32'	Report	Andrijašević 19'; Maglica 59'	Stadium: Stadion Maksimir; Attendance: 2,000; Referee: Tihomir Pejin (Donji Miholjac)

2 March 2014 24	Hajduk Split	3–0	Slaven Belupo	Split
17:00 CET (UTC+01:00)	Andrijašević 5'; Maglica 29', 65'; Vršajević (yellow card) 80'	Report	Matoš (yellow card) 20'; Grgić (yellow card) 27'; Čanađija (yellow card) 54'; Glavica (yellow card) 86'	Stadium: Stadion Poljud; Attendance: 6,000; Referee: Ante Vučemilović-Šimunović (Osijek)

9 March 2014 25	Istra 1961	1–1	Hajduk Split	Pula
19:00 CET (UTC+01:00)	Batarelo (yellow card) 25'; Havojić 41' (pen.); Hajder (yellow card) 90'; M. Kramarić (yellow card) 90+2'	Report	Maglica 6' (yellow card) 64'; Maloča (yellow card) 37'; Stipica (yellow card) 39'; Nižič (yellow card) 56'; Pašalić (yellow card) 70'; Jozinović (yellow card) 73'	Stadium: Stadion Aldo Drosina; Attendance: 5,500; Referee: Fran Jović (Zagreb)

16 March 2014 26	Osijek	1–1	Hajduk Split	Osijek
19:00 CET (UTC+01:00)	Pavić 57'; Matas (yellow card) 60'; J. Mišić (yellow card) 84'	Report	Milić 90+5'	Stadium: Stadion Gradski vrt Attendance: 5,000; Referee: Zlatko Šimčić (Koprivnica)

22 March 2014 27	Hajduk Split	0–2	Dinamo Zagreb	Split
15:00 CET (UTC+01:00)	Maglica (yellow card) 11'; Milović (yellow card) 23'; Pašalić (yellow card) 40'; Maloča (yellow card) 86'	Report	Čop 24' (pen.); Antolić (yellow card) 31'; Šimunović (yellow card) 58'; Ademi (yellow card) 63'; Halilović 90+4'	Stadium: Stadion Poljud; Attendance: 25,000; Referee: Domagoj Ljubičić (Osijek)

28 March 2014 28	Hajduk Split	3–1	Zadar	Split
19:00 CET (UTC+01:00)	Abdukholiqov 15'; Maglica 47', 75'; Anđelković (yellow card) 73'; Maloča (penalty missed) 79'	Report	Hrgović (yellow card) 51'; Matković (yellow card) 75'; Šimurina (yellow card) 90+3'	Stadium: Stadion Poljud; Attendance: 4,500; Referee: Danijel Trampus (Osijek)

6 April 2014 29	Rijeka	4–1	Hajduk Split	Rijeka
15:00 CEST (UTC+02:00)	Krstanović 13' (pen.) 53' (pen.); Sharbini 69', 86' (yellow card) 70'	Report	Stipica (yellow card) 13'; Bašić (yellow card) 20'; Pašalić 28'; Maloča (red card) 52'	Stadium: Stadion Kantrida; Attendance: 9,500; Referee: Marijo Strahonja (Zagreb)

13 April 2014 30	Hajduk Split	1–0	RNK Split	Split
19:00 CEST (UTC+02:00)	Jozinović (yellow card) 39'; Pašalić 40'	Report	Dujmović (yellow card) 22'; Bagarić (yellow card) 42'; Vrgoč (yellow card) 65'	Stadium: Stadion Poljud; Attendance: 6,000; Referee: Ivo Krečak (Šibenik)

16 April 2014 31	Hrvatski Dragovoljac	4–1	Hajduk Split	Zagreb
17:00 CEST (UTC+02:00)	Mrčela 3'; Doležal 24'; Božić (yellow card) 43'; Bačelić-Grgić (yellow card) 49'; Tomić 69' (yellow card) 70'; Špehar (yellow card) 73'; Čović (yellow card) 85'; Rašić 90+2'	Report	Pašalić (yellow card) 41'; Maloča (yellow card) 70'; Vršajević (yellow card) 72'; Špehar 85' (o.g.)	Stadium: Stadion NŠC Stjepan Spajić; Attendance: 2,000; Referee: Mario Zebec (Cestica)

21 April 2014 32	Hajduk Split	2–2	Lokomotiva	Split
18:00 CEST (UTC+02:00)	Sušić 31'; Andrijašević (yellow card) 39' (yellow-red card) 60'; Maglica 52'; Pašalić (yellow card) 59'; Bradarić (yellow card) 77'	Report	Budimir 56' (yellow card) 82'; Musa 66' (yellow card) 70'; Chago (yellow card) 85'; Gorupec (yellow card) 90'	Stadium: Stadion Poljud; Attendance: 3,000; Referee: Domagoj Ljubičić (Osijek)

26 April 2014 33	Slaven Belupo	3–0	Hajduk Split	Koprivnica
15:00 CEST (UTC+02:00)	Do. Glavina 18'; Fuštar 42'; Matoš (yellow card) 45'; Purić (yellow card) 46'; Ozobić (yellow card) 53'; Vugrinec 69'; Gregurina (yellow card) 72'	Report	Sušić (yellow card) 31'; Bradarić (yellow card) 35'; Vršajević (red card) 35'; Maloku (yellow card) 48'	Stadium: Gradski stadion Attendance: 3,000; Referee: Marko Matoc (Zaprešić)

4 May 2014 34	Hajduk Split	0–1	Istra 1961	Split
19:00 CEST (UTC+02:00)	Tomić (yellow card) 59'; Milović (yellow card) 83'	Report	Heister (yellow card) 38'; Blagojević (yellow card) 45+3'; Radonjić 63'	Stadium: Stadion Poljud; Attendance: 3,500; Referee: Željko Frković (Gospić)

11 May 2014 35	Hajduk Split	4–2	Osijek	Split
19:00 CEST (UTC+02:00)	Sušić 23'; Milović 38', 70'; Kouassi 88'; Maloča (yellow card) 90+14'	Report	Vidaković (yellow card) 47'; B. Barišić 75'; Cesarec 90+5'; Babić (yellow card) 90+11'	Stadium: Stadion Poljud; Attendance: 4,000; Referee: Marijo Strahonja (Zagreb)

17 May 2014 36	Dinamo Zagreb	3–0 (1–0) (Awarded)	Hajduk Split	Zagreb
15:00 CEST (UTC+02:00)	Halilović (yellow card) 22'; Leko (yellow card) 64' (goal) 79'	Report		Stadium: Stadion Maksimir; Attendance: 5,988; Referee: Ivan Bebek (Rijeka)
Note: The match was abandoned after 85 minutes due to a joint chanting of both fan groups against the leaders of Croatian Football Federation and Dinamo Zagreb. After that the match was awarded to Dinamo Zagreb.

Source: HRnogomet.com

=== Croatian Football Cup ===
1 October 2013 R1	Kustošija	1–5	Hajduk Split	Zagreb
15:00 CEST (UTC+02:00)	Slijepčević (yellow card) 61'; Ljuboja 89'	Report	Kouassi (yellow card) 28' (goal) 40'; Jonjić 38'; Kiš 56'; Andrijašević 80'; Maloku 90' (yellow card) 90'	Stadium: Igralište Kustošije; Attendance: 1,500; Referee: Željko Frković (Gospić)

30 October 2013 R2	Vinogradar	2–3 (a.e.t.)	Hajduk Split	Jastrebarsko
14:00 CET (UTC+01:00)	Povrženić (yellow card) 16' (goal) 38'; Lončar (yellow card) 63'; Gavarić (yellow card) 73'; Medven (yellow card) 115'	Report	Nižić (yellow card) 44'; Bencun 64' (pen.); Maloku (yellow card) 105'; Kouassi 108'; Kiš 114'	Stadium: SC Mladina; Attendance: 1,500; Referee: Mario Zebec (Cestica)

4 December 2013 QF	Dinamo Zagreb	5–0	Hajduk Split	Zagreb
18:00 CET (UTC+01:00)	Šimunić 17'; Čop 47', 63'; Fernándes 56'; Halilović 81'	Report	Milović (yellow card) 44'; Sušić (yellow card) 56'; Bradarić (yellow card) 71' (yellow-red card) 86'; Maloča (yellow card) 82'; Kouassi (yellow card) 89'	Stadium: Stadion Maksimir; Attendance: 4,000; Referee: Tihomir Pejin (Donji Miholjac)

18 December 2013 QF	Hajduk Split	1–2 (1–7 agg.)	Dinamo Zagreb	Split
16:00 CET (UTC+01:00)	Bradarić (yellow card) 7' (goal) 23' (pen.)	Report	Ademi 6'; Leko (yellow card) 22'; Soudani (yellow card) 48'; Antolić 86'	Stadium: Stadion Poljud; Attendance: 8,000; Referee: Ivan Bebek (Rijeka)

Source: HRnogomet.com

=== Europa League ===
==== Second qualifying round ====
18 July 2013 First leg	Hajduk Split (Croatia)	2–1	(North Macedonia) Turnovo	Split, Croatia
20:30 CEST (UTC+02:00)	Bencun 8'; Maloča 79'	Report	Blazhevski (yellow card) 15' (goal) 45+1' (pen.); Mitrov (yellow card) 50'	Stadium: Stadion Poljud; Attendance: 0 Referee: Richard Liesveld (Netherlands)

25 July 2013 Second leg	Turnovo (North Macedonia)	1–1 (2–3 agg.)	(Croatia) Hajduk Split	Skopje, Macedonia
17:45 CEST (UTC+02:00)	Mitrev (yellow card) 53'; Iliev (yellow card) 57'; Mitrov (yellow card) 62'; Pandev 70'	Report	Mikanović (yellow card) 32'; Sušić (yellow card) 45+3'; Kouassi (yellow card) 51'; Mujan (yellow card) 57'; Caktaš 60'; Maloča (yellow card) 80'; Maglica (yellow card) 89'	Stadium: Philip II Arena; Attendance: 4,000; Referee: Arnold Hunter (Northern Ireland)

==== Third qualifying round ====
1 August 2013 First leg	Hajduk Split (Croatia)	0–1	(Georgia (country)) Dila Gori	Split, Croatia
21:00 CEST (UTC+02:00)	Maglica (yellow card) 33'; Jozinović (yellow card) 47' (yellow-red card) 65'; Mujan (yellow card) 90+1'	Report	Iluridze 24'; Khizaneishvili (yellow card) 49' (yellow-red card) 71'; Gorelishvili (yellow card) 90+2'	Stadium: Stadion Poljud; Attendance: 25,000; Referee: Eitan Shemeulevitch (Israel)

8 August 2013 Second leg	Dila Gori (Georgia (country))	1–0 (2–0 agg.)	(Croatia) Hajduk Split	Tbilisi, Georgia
20:00 GET (UTC+04:00)	Kvakhadze (yellow card) 66'; Dolidze 82'	Report	Milović (yellow card) 31'; Mikanović (yellow card) 84'; Maloča (yellow card) 90+2'; Kiš (yellow card) 90+3'	Stadium: Mikheil Meskhi Stadium; Attendance: 12,000; Referee: Tamás Bognár (Hungary)

Source: uefa.com

== Player seasonal records ==
Competitive matches only. Updated to games played 11 May 2014.

=== Top scorers ===
Rank	Name	League	Europe	Cup	Supercup	Total
1	(Croatia) Anton Maglica	12	–	–	–	12
2	(Croatia) Mario Pašalić	11	–	–	–	11
3	(Croatia) Franko Andrijašević	6	–	1	–	7
3	(Croatia) Marko Bencun	5	1	1	–	7
3	(Ivory Coast) Jean Evrard Kouassi	5	–	2	–	7
6	(Croatia) Tomislav Kiš	2	–	2	–	4
7	(Croatia) Mijo Caktaš	1	1	–	1	3
7	(Bosnia and Herzegovina) Tino-Sven Sušić	3	–	–	–	3
9	(Croatia) Filip Bradarić	1	–	1	–	2
9	(Croatia) Mario Maloča	1	1	–	–	2
9	(Croatia) Antonio Milić	2	–	–	–	2
9	(Croatia) Goran Milović	2	–	–	–	2
13	(Uzbekistan) Temurkhuja Abdukholiqov	1	–	–	–	1
13	(Croatia) Josip Bašić	1	–	–	–	1
13	(Georgia (country)) Giorgi Iluridze	1	–	–	–	1
13	(Croatia) Matej Jonjić	–	–	1	–	1
13	(Croatia) Elvir Maloku	–	–	1	–	1
13	(Croatia) Dino Mikanović	1	–	–	–	1
13	(Bosnia and Herzegovina) Avdija Vršajević	1	–	–	–	1
	Own goals	2	–	–	–	2
	TOTALS	56	3	9	1	69

Source: Competitive matches

=== Disciplinary record ===
Includes all competitive matches. Players with 1 card or more included only.

Number	Position	Name	1. HNL (Note: Two yellow cards resulting in a red are counted as a total of three cards – i.e. two yellow and one red card.)		Europa League		Croatian Cup		Croatian Super Cup		Total	
Number	Position	Name	Booked	Sent off (straight red)	Booked	Sent off (straight red)	Booked	Sent off (straight red)	Booked	Sent off (straight red)	Booked	Sent off (straight red)
1	GK	(Croatia) Fabjan Tomić	1	0	0	0	0	0	0	0	1	0
2	DF	(Croatia) Dino Mikanović	2	0	2	0	0	0	0	0	4	0
4	DF	(Croatia) Antonio Milić	2	0	0	0	0	0	0	0	2	0
5	DF	(Croatia) Goran Milović	7	0	1	0	1	0	0	0	9	0
6	DF	(Bosnia and Herzegovina) Avdija Vršajević	7	1	0	0	0	0	0	0	7	1
7	MF	(Croatia) Mislav Anđelković	1	0	0	0	0	0	0	0	1	0
8	MF	(Croatia) Mario Pašalić	9	0	0	0	0	0	0	0	9	0
9	FW	(Croatia) Anton Maglica	5	0	2	0	0	0	0	0	7	0
10	MF	(Croatia) Franko Andrijašević	4	1	0	0	0	0	0	0	4	1
11	FW	(Georgia (country)) Giorgi Iluridze	1	0	0	0	0	0	0	0	1	0
14	FW	(Croatia) Tonći Mujan	0	0	2	0	0	0	0	0	2	0
17	DF	(Croatia) Goran Jozinović	7	0	2	1	0	0	1	0	10	1
19	MF	(Croatia) Elvir Maloku	2	0	0	0	2	0	0	0	4	0
21	MF	(Austria) Haris Bukva	1	0	0	0	0	0	0	0	1	0
22	DF	(Croatia) Mario Maloča	9	1	2	0	1	0	0	0	12	1
23	DF	(Croatia) Zoran Nižić	1	0	0	0	1	0	0	0	2	0
25	GK	(Croatia) Dante Stipica	2	0	0	0	0	0	0	0	2	0
28	DF	(Croatia) Filip Bradarić	5	0	0	0	3	1	0	0	8	1
30	MF	(Croatia) Josip Bašić	2	0	0	0	0	0	0	0	2	0
31	MF	(Bosnia and Herzegovina) Tino-Sven Sušić	6	0	1	0	1	0	0	0	8	0
32	FW	(Croatia) Marko Bencun	1	0	0	0	0	0	0	0	1	0
33	FW	(Croatia) Tomislav Kiš	4	1	1	0	0	0	0	0	5	1
35	DF	(Croatia) Luka Lučić	1	0	0	0	0	0	0	0	1	0
77	FW	(Ivory Coast) Jean Evrard Kouassi	2	0	1	0	2	0	0	0	5	0
		TOTALS	82	4	14	1	11	1	1	0	108	6

Sources: Prva-HNL.hr, UEFA.com

=== Appearances and goals ===
Number	Position	Player	Apps	Goals	Apps	Goals	Apps	Goals	Apps	Goals
Number	Position	Player	Total		1. HNL (Note: First number represents appearances in starting eleven, while the second number indicates a substitute appearance.)		Europa League		Croatian Cup	
1	GK	(Croatia) Fabjan Tomić	7	0	5+2	0	0+0	0	0+0	0
2	DF	(Croatia) Dino Mikanović	16	1	8+2	1	4+0	0	1+1	0
4	DF	(Croatia) Antonio Milić	22	2	15+3	2	2+0	0	2+0	0
5	DF	(Croatia) Goran Milović	40	2	34+0	2	2+1	0	3+0	0
6	DF	(Bosnia and Herzegovina) Avdija Vršajević	30	1	26+0	1	2+0	0	1+1	0
7	MF	(Croatia) Mislav Anđelković	25	0	15+5	0	3+0	0	1+1	0
8	MF	(Croatia) Mario Pašalić	36	11	28+2	11	3+0	0	3+0	0
9	FW	(Croatia) Anton Maglica	36	12	28+3	12	3+1	0	1+0	0
10	MF	(Croatia) Franko Andrijašević	29	7	21+5	6	1+1	0	1+0	1
11	MF	(Bosnia and Herzegovina) Ismar Hairlahović	1	0	0+1	0	0+0	0	0+0	0
11	FW	(Georgia (country)) Giorgi Iluridze	15	1	9+4	1	0+0	0	1+1	0
14	MF	(Croatia) Ivan Anton Vasilj	2	0	0+2	0	0+0	0	0+0	0
14	FW	(Croatia) Tonći Mujan	13	0	3+5	0	1+3	0	0+1	0
15	FW	(Uzbekistan) Temurkhuja Abdukholiqov	9	1	6+3	1	0+0	0	0+0	0
15	MF	(Australia) Steven Lustica	1	0	0+1	0	0+0	0	0+0	0
16	MF	(Croatia) Andrija Balić	2	0	0+2	0	0+0	0	0+0	0
17	DF	(Croatia) Goran Jozinović	32	0	22+4	0	3+0	0	3+0	0
18	MF	(Croatia) Mijo Caktaš	10	2	5+1	1	4+0	1	0+0	0
19	MF	(Croatia) Elvir Maloku	13	1	2+9	0	0+0	0	0+2	1
20	MF	(Croatia) Ivan Tomičić	5	0	1+3	0	0+1	0	0+0	0
21	MF	(Austria) Haris Bukva	13	0	7+4	0	0+0	0	2+0	0
22	DF	(Croatia) Mario Maloča	36	2	30+0	1	4+0	1	2+0	0
23	DF	(Croatia) Zoran Nižić	15	0	8+4	0	0+0	0	2+1	0
24	FW	(Albania) Arlind Basha	3	0	0+3	0	0+0	0	0+0	0
25	GK	(Croatia) Dante Stipica	10	0	7+0	0	0+0	0	3+0	0
27	DF	(Croatia) Matej Jonjić	4	1	1+1	0	0+0	0	2+0	1
28	MF	(Croatia) Filip Bradarić	30	2	19+6	1	1+0	0	4+0	1
30	MF	(Croatia) Josip Bašić	12	1	1+10	1	0+0	0	0+1	0
31	MF	(Bosnia and Herzegovina) Tino-Sven Sušić	39	3	27+5	3	4+0	0	2+1	0
32	FW	(Croatia) Marko Bencun	21	7	6+9	5	2+1	1	2+1	1
33	FW	(Croatia) Tomislav Kiš	16	4	4+5	2	0+3	0	3+1	2
35	DF	(Croatia) Luka Lučić	2	0	1+1	0	0+0	0	0+0	0
77	FW	(Ivory Coast) Jean Evrard Kouassi	36	7	29+1	5	1+1	0	4+0	2
91	GK	(Croatia) Lovre Kalinić	29	0	24+0	0	4+0	0	1+0	0

Sources: Prva-HNL.hr, UEFA.com

== Transfers ==
=== In ===
Date	Position	Player	From	Fee
10 June 2013	MF	(Croatia) Mislav Anđelković	NK Istra 1961	Free
12 June 2013	FW	(Croatia) Ivan Mastelić	NK Junak Sinj	Free
14 June 2013	MF	(Bosnia and Herzegovina) Goran Galešić	FC Koper	Undisclosed
19 August 2013	FW	(Albania) Elvir Maloku	HNK Rijeka	Undisclosed
29 August 2013	MF	(Austria) Haris Bukva	SK Sturm Graz	Free
30 August 2013	FW	(Georgia (country)) Giorgi Iluridze	FC Dila Gori	Undisclosed
1 February 2014	FW	(Uzbekistan) Temurkhuja Abdukholiqov	Pakhtakor FK	Undisclosed

=== Out ===
Date	Position	Player	To	Fee
28 May 2013	DF	(Portugal) Rúben Lima	GNK Dinamo Zagreb	Free (released)
1 June 2013	FW	(Bosnia and Herzegovina) Belmin Vila	FK Mladost Podgorica	Free (released)
7 June 2013	LB	(Croatia) Josip Tomašević	RNK Split	Free
10 June 2013	FW	(Croatia) Ivo Caput	NK GOŠK Dubrovnik	Free (released)
10 June 2013	GK	(Croatia) Pavao Vugdelija	TBD	Free
10 June 2013	MF	(Croatia) Filip Ozobić	FC Spartak Moscow	Loan ended
11 June 2013	MF	(Croatia) Antonio Jakoliš	Mouscron-Péruwelz	Free (released)
16 June 2013	LB	(Croatia) Danijel Stojanović	HŠK Zrinjski Mostar	Free (released)
16 June 2013	DM	(Croatia) Zoran Plazonić	NK Široki Brijeg	Free (released)
23 June 2013	MF	(Croatia) Joško Hajder	RNK Split	Undisclosed
28 June 2013	DF	(Croatia) Duje Medak	NK Inter Zaprešić	Undisclosed
2 July 2013	MF	(Bosnia and Herzegovina) Goran Galešić	FC Koper	Free (released)
10 July 2013	DF	(Croatia) Josip Elez	S.S. Lazio	€550,000
23 July 2013	FW	(Montenegro) Ivan Vuković	Seongnam Ilhwa Chunma	$200,000
30 August 2013	GK	(Croatia) Goran Blažević	PFC Levski Sofia	Undisclosed
9 September 2013	MF	(Australia) Steven Lustica	Adelaide United FC	Free
14 March 2014	MF	(Austria) Haris Bukva	TBD	Free (released)
16 April 2014	FW	(Georgia (country)) Giorgi Iluridze	Ermis Aradippou	Free (released)

=== Loans out ===
Date	Position	Player	To	Until
15 June 2013	DF	(Croatia) Špiro Peričić	NK Istra 1961	30 June 2014
15 June 2013	MF	(Croatia) Krešo Ljubičić	NK Hrvatski Dragovoljac	30 June 2014
27 June 2013	RW	(Croatia) Mirko Oremuš	Bnei Sakhnin F.C.	30 June 2014
9 July 2013	MF	(Croatia) Frane Vladislavić	NK Dugopolje	30 June 2014
3 August 2013	FW	(Croatia) Ivan Jakov Džoni	HNK Cibalia	30 July 2014
1 September 2013	MF	(Croatia) Ivo-Valentino Tomaš	NK Dugopolje	30 June 2014
3 September 2013	FW	(Croatia) Ivan Tomičić	HNK Segesta	31 December 2013
5 September 2013	MF	(Burkina Faso) Patrice Zoungrana	NK Primorac 1929	30 June 2014
19 January 2014	MF	(Croatia) Matej Jonjić	NK Osijek	30 June 2014
31 January 2014	FW	(Croatia) Tonći Mujan	Deportivo de La Coruña	30 June 2014

Sources: nogometni-magazin.com
