= 2013–14 GNK Dinamo Zagreb season =

GNK Dinamo Zagreb
2013–14 season
- Chairman: Mirko Barišić
- Manager: Zoran Mamić
- Stadium: Maksimir Stadium, Zagreb
- Prva HNL: 1st
- Croatian Cup: Runners-up
- Croatian Supercup: Winners
- UEFA Champions League: Play-off round
- UEFA Europa League: Group stage
- Top goalscorer: League: Duje Čop (22); All: Duje Čop (33)
- Highest home attendance: 13,500 vs. Hajduk Split (6 July 2013 – Supercup)
- Lowest home attendance: 7,500 vs. Osijek ( 12 July 2013 – Prva HNL)
- Average home league attendance: 10,250

The 2013–14 season was Dinamo Zagreb's 23rd season in the Croatian First Division and 102nd year in existence as a football club.

== Season review ==
=== Domestic competitions ===
==== Croatian Supercup ====
On 6 July 2013, champions Dinamo Zagreb will face Cup holders Hajduk Split at Maksimir, for the 2013 Supercup title. Dinamo Zagreb won after penalties 4–1. After 90 minutes the result was 1-1. Duje Čop scored only goal for Dinamo Zagreb.

==== Croatian First Division ====
On 12 July 2013, Dinamo Zagreb played first game of the new season against Osijek and won 3–1. Duje Čop scored two goals and Hillel Soudani scored once.

=== First team squad ===
Note: Flags indicate national team as defined under FIFA eligibility rules; some limited exceptions apply. Players may hold more than one non-FIFA nationality.

No.	Pos.	Nation	Player
2	FW	ALG	El Arbi Hillel Soudani
4	DF	CRO	Josip Šimunić (captain)
5	DF	CRO	Jozo Šimunović
6	DF	POR	Ivo Pinto
7	MF	MKD	Arijan Ademi
8	MF	CRO	Domagoj Antolić
11	FW	CHI	Junior Fernándes (on loan from Bayer Leverkusen)
12	GK	CRO	Oliver Zelenika
13	DF	GHA	Lee Addy (on loan from Dalian Aerbin)
17	MF	BIH	Said Husejinović
19	DF	CRO	Josip Pivarić
20	MF	CRO	Zvonko Pamić
21	FW	MNE	Fatos Beqiraj
23	DF	POR	Ruben Lima
26	FW	CRO	Fran Brodić
27	MF	CRO	Jerko Leko (vice-captain)
28	MF	CRO	Alen Halilović
29	GK	POL	Grzegorz Sandomierski (on loan from Racing Genk)
33	GK	CRO	Marko Mikulić
77	MF	CRO	Marcelo Brozović
90	FW	CRO	Duje Čop

== Transfers and loans ==
=== In ===
==== Summer ====
Squad #	Position	Player	Transferred from	Fee	Date	Source
	FW	(Algeria) El Arbi Hillel Soudani	(Portugal) Vitória de Guimarães	€900,000	25 May 2013	

=== Loan in ===
Squad #	Position	Player	Loaned From	Start	End	Source
	FW	(Chile) Junior Fernandes	(Germany) Bayer 04 Leverkusen	26 May 2013	30 June 2014	

==== Summer ====
Squad #	Position	Player	Transferred To	Fee	Date	Source
16	DF	(Croatia) Tin Jedvaj	(Italy) Roma	€5 million	10 July 2013	
14	DF	(Croatia) Šime Vrsaljko	(Italy) Genoa	undisclosed fee	12 July 2013	
77	MF	(Chile) Pedro Morales	(Spain) Málaga	Free	12 June 2013	

=== Loan out ===
Squad #	Position	Player	Loaned To	Start	End	Source
3	DF	(Argentina) Luis Ibáñez	(Argentina) Racing Club	1 August 2013	15 June 2014	

=== Overall transfer activity ===
==== Spending ====
Summer: ▼€700,000

Winter: €0

Total: ▼€700,000

==== Income ====
Summer: ▲€5,000,000

Winter: €0

Total: ▲€5,000,000

==== Expenditure ====
Summer: ▼€0

Winter: €0

Total: ▼€0

=== MAXtv Prva Liga ===
Kickoff times are in CET

==== League table ====
Pos	Team	Pld	W	D	L	GF	GA	GD	Pts	Qualification or relegation
1	Dinamo Zagreb (C)	36	26	6	4	83	26	+57	84	Qualification to Champions League second qualifying round
2	Rijeka	36	21	10	5	72	35	+37	73	Qualification to Europa League second qualifying round
3	Hajduk Split	36	17	11	8	58	44	+14	62	Qualification to Europa League second qualifying round
4	RNK Split	36	14	10	12	41	41	0	52	Qualification to Europa League first qualifying round
5	Lokomotiva	36	15	7	14	57	59	−2	52	

Source: Sportnet.hr
Rules for classification: 1) points; 2) goal difference; 3) number of goals scored.
For deciding champions, qualification to UEFA Europa League and relegation: 1st points; 2nd head-to-head points; 3rd head-to-head goal difference; 4th head-to-head away goals scored
(C) Champions

==== Results summary ====
Overall								Home						Away					
Pld	W	D	L	GF	GA	GD	Pts	W	D	L	GF	GA	GD	W	D	L	GF	GA	GD
19	13	4	2	35	13	+22	43	10	1	0	27	8	+19	3	3	2	8	5	+3

Last updated: 15 December 2013.
Source: Competitive matches

==== Results by round ====
Round	1	2	3	4	5	6	7	8	9	10	11	12	13	14	15	16	17	18	19	20	21	22	23	24	25	26	27	28	29	30	31	32	33	34	35	36	37	38
Ground	H	H	A	H	A	H	A	H																														
Result	W	W	D	W	D	W	W	W	L	W	D	W	L	W	W	W	D	W	W																			
Position	4	2	3	2	2	1	1	1	2	2	2	2	2	1	1	1	1	1	1																			

Updated to match(es) played on 15 December 2013. Source: Statto.com
A = Away; H = Home; W = Win; D = Draw; L = Loss

== Results and fixtures ==
=== Legend ===
Win Draw Loss Postponed

==== Matches ====
12 July 2013 1	Dinamo Zagreb	3–1	Osijek	Zagreb
21:00 CET	Soudani 12'; Čop 19' (pen.) 68'	Report	(yellow card) 10' Mandić; 90' Barišić	Stadium: Stadion Maksimir; Attendance: 7,500; Referee: Borut Križarić

19 July 2013 2	Dinamo Zagreb	3–0	Zadar	Zagreb
20:15 CET	Kramarić 56' 88'; Čop 90'	Report	(yellow card) 33' Muić; (yellow card) 80' Vasilj	Stadium: Stadion Maksimir; Attendance: 6,455; Referee: Andrej Burilo

28 July 2013 3	Rijeka	0–0	Dinamo Zagreb	Rijeka
19:00 CET	Maleš (yellow card) 49'	Report	(yellow card) 64' Ademi; (yellow card) 82' Pivarić	Stadium: Stadion Kantrida; Attendance: 10,000; Referee: Zlatko Šimčić

3 August 2013 4	Dinamo Zagreb	1–0	Split	Zagreb
21:00 CET	Soudani (yellow card) 86' (goal) 89'	Report	(yellow card) 21' Dujmović	Stadium: Stadion Maksimir; Attendance: 4,470; Referee: Domagoj Ljubičić

10 August 2013 5	Hrvatski dragovoljac	1–1	Dinamo Zagreb	Zagreb
21:00 CET	Doležal 66'	Report	65' Soudani; (yellow card) 67' Ademi	Stadium: Stadion Kranjčevićeva; Attendance: 2,000; Referee: Igor Pristovnik

17 August 2013 6	Dinamo Zagreb	2–1	Lokomotiva	Zagreb
19:00 CET	Šimunović 9' (yellow card) 45'; Leko (yellow card) 53'; Fernandes 59'; Sammir (yellow card) 90'	Report	(yellow card) 15' Šitum; 78' Puljić	Stadium: Stadion Kranjčevićeva; Attendance: 5,000; Referee: Fran Jović

24 August 2013 7	Slaven Belupo	1–3	Dinamo Zagreb	Koprivnica
19:00 CET	Crepulja (yellow card) 11'; Novinić 18'; Edson (yellow card) 23'	Report	7' Bećiraj; 25' 90' Fernandes; (yellow card) 33' Lima; (yellow card) 38' Šimunović; (yellow card) 90' Ademi	Stadium: Gradski stadion Attendance: 2,500; Referee: Ivan Bebek

31 August 2013 8	Dinamo Zagreb	3–1	Istra 1961	Zagreb
21:00 CET	Šimunić (yellow card) 14'; Bećiraj 23'; Soudani 45'; Fernandes 53'	Report	(yellow card) 18' Miličević; (yellow card) 68' Jo; (yellow card) 84' Batarelo; 87' Havojić	Stadium: Stadion Maksimir; Attendance: 3,523; Referee: Zlatko Šimčić

14 September 2013 9	Hajduk Split	2–0	Dinamo Zagreb	Split, Croatia
20:00 CET	Jozinović (yellow card) 40'; Pašalić 49', 69'; Milović (yellow card) 61'; Maglica (yellow card) 74'	Summary	Sammir (yellow card) 61'; Ruben Lima (yellow card) 90'	Stadium: Stadion Poljud; Attendance: 25,000; Referee: Tihomir Pejin

22 September 2013 10	Osijek	0–1	Dinamo Zagreb	Osijek
16:00 CET	Lukić (yellow card) 11'; Mišić (yellow card) 90'	Summary	Soudani 41'	Stadium: Stadion Gradski vrt Attendance: 3,500; Referee: Duje Strukan

29 September 2013 11	Zadar	0–0	Dinamo Zagreb	Zadar
16:00 CET	Ante Sarić (yellow card) 16'; Ivan Šimurina (yellow card) 89'; Josip Ivančić (yellow card) 90'	Summary	Ademi (yellow card) 24'; Saré (yellow card) 69'	Stadium: Stadion Stanovi; Attendance: 2,500; Referee: Bruno Marić

6 October 2013 12	Dinamo Zagreb	1–0	Rijeka	Zagreb
20:00 CET	Pivarić (yellow card) 47'; Ademi (yellow card) 54'; Soudani 90+3'	Summary	Močinić (yellow card) 27'; Bertoša (yellow card) 39'; Datković (yellow card) 70'	Stadium: Stadion Maksimir; Attendance: 7,000; Referee: Tihomir Pejin

19 October 2013 13	RNK Split	1–0	Dinamo Zagreb	Split, Croatia
20:00 CET	Bilić 39'; Goran Roce (yellow card) 60'; Vojnović (yellow card) 65'; Belle (yellow card) 90'; Radotić (yellow card) 90'; Zagorac (yellow card) 90'	Summary	Ademi (yellow card) 80'; Šimunić (yellow card) 86'	Stadium: Stadion Park mladeži Attendance: 2,000; Referee: Domagoj Ljubičić

27 October 2013 14	Dinamo Zagreb	4–1	Hrvatski Dragovoljac	Zagreb
16:00 CET	Soudani 4'; Fernándes 8'; Brozović 53'; Šimunović (yellow card) 65' (red card) 90'; Čop 76'	Summary	Stipe Bačelić-Grgić 66' (pen.)	Stadium: Stadion Maksimir; Attendance: 3,600; Referee: Fran Jović

2 November 2013 15	Lokomotiva	0–3	Dinamo Zagreb	Zagreb
16:00 CET	Toni Gorupec (yellow card) 37'	Summary	Brozović 37' (pen.); Antolić 69'; Rukavina 88'	Stadium: Stadion Maksimir; Attendance: 1,300; Referee: Zlatko Šimčić

10 November 2013 16	Dinamo Zagreb	1–0	Slaven Belupo	Zagreb
16:00 CET	Leko (yellow card) 38'; Čop 51' (pen.); Addy (yellow card) 61'	Summary	Grgić (yellow card) 68'	Stadium: Stadion Maksimir; Attendance: 2,000; Referee: Danijel Trampus

23 November 2013 17	Istra 1961	–	Dinamo Zagreb	Pula
16:00 CET				Stadium: Stadion Aldo Drosina

1 December 2013 18	Dinamo Zagreb	2–2	Hajduk Split	Zagreb
16:00 CET	Soudani 27'; Rúben Lima (yellow card) 28'; Čop 54'; Leko (yellow card) 77'	Summary	Kouassi 11'; Bradarić (yellow card) 51'; Milović (yellow card) 64'; Jozinović (yellow card) 70'; Maglica 90+1'	Stadium: Stadion Maksimir; Attendance: 10,000; Referee: (Croatia) Domagoj Ljubičić

=== UEFA Champions League ===
The team won the Croatian championship last season and as such will enter the 2013–14 UEFA Champions League second qualifying round. On 16 July 2013, Dinamo Zagreb played first qualification game against Fola Esch in Luxembourg. They won 0–5, Two time scorer was Hilel Soudani, Duje Čop, Arijan Ademi and Junior Fernandes scored once. They won 1–0 in the replay and progressed to the third qualifying round.

==== Third qualifying round ====
30 July 2013 1st Leg	Dinamo Zagreb (Croatia)	1–0	(Moldova) Sheriff Tiraspol	Maksimir Stadium, Zagreb
20:45	Rukavina 89'			Referee: Carlos Gómez (Spain)

7 August 2013 2nd Leg	Sheriff Tiraspol (Moldova)	0–3	(Croatia) Dinamo Zagreb	Sheriff Stadium, Tiraspol
19:00		Report	Junior Fernándes 10 El Arbi Hillel Soudani 27 Duje Čop 61	Referee: Danny Makkelie (Netherlands)

==== Play-off round ====
21 August 2013 1st Leg	Dinamo Zagreb (Croatia)	0–2	Austria Wien	Stadion Maksimir, Zagreb
20:45		Report	Leovac 68'; Stanković 75'	Attendance: 21,729; Referee: Howard Webb (England)

27 August 2013 2nd Leg	Austria Wien	2–3 (3–2 agg.)	(Croatia) Dinamo Zagreb	Generali Arena, Vienna
20:45		Report		Attendance: 10,500; Referee: Paolo Tagliavento (Italy)

=== UEFA Europa League ===
==== Group B ====
Pos	Team	Pld	W	D	L	GF	GA	GD	Pts	Qualification	LUD	CHO	PSV	DIN
1	(Bulgaria) Ludogorets Razgrad	6	5	1	0	11	2	+9	16	Advance to knockout phase	—	1–1	2–0	3–0
2	(Ukraine) Chornomorets Odesa	6	3	1	2	6	6	0	10	Advance to knockout phase	0–1	—	0–2	2–1
3	(Netherlands) PSV Eindhoven	6	2	1	3	4	5	−1	7		0–2	0–1	—	2–0
4	(Croatia) Dinamo Zagreb	6	0	1	5	3	11	−8	1		1–2	1–2	0–0	—

Source: Soccerway
19 September 2013
19:00

Dinamo Zagreb (Croatia)	v	(Ukraine) Chornomorets Odesa
	Report

Stadion Maksimir, Zagreb
19 September 2013
19:00

PSV Eindhoven (Netherlands)	v	(Bulgaria) Ludogorets Razgrad
	Report

Philips Stadion, Eindhoven

3 October 2013
21:05

Ludogorets Razgrad (Bulgaria)	v	(Croatia) Dinamo Zagreb
	Report

Vasil Levski National Stadium, Sofia
3 October 2013
21:05

Chornomorets Odesa (Ukraine)	v	(Netherlands) PSV Eindhoven
	Report

Chornomorets Stadium, Odesa

24 October 2013
21:05

Chornomorets Odesa (Ukraine)	v	(Bulgaria) Ludogorets Razgrad
	Report

Chornomorets Stadium, Odesa
24 October 2013
21:05

Dinamo Zagreb (Croatia)	v	(Netherlands) PSV Eindhoven
	Report

Stadion Maksimir, Zagreb

7 November 2013
19:00

Ludogorets Razgrad (Bulgaria)	v	(Ukraine) Chornomorets Odesa
	Report

Vasil Levski National Stadium, Sofia
7 November 2013
19:00

PSV Eindhoven (Netherlands)	v	(Croatia) Dinamo Zagreb
	Report

Philips Stadion, Eindhoven

28 November 2013
21:05

Chornomorets Odesa (Ukraine)	v	(Croatia) Dinamo Zagreb
	Report

Chornomorets Stadium, Odesa
28 November 2013
21:05

Ludogorets Razgrad (Bulgaria)	v	(Netherlands) PSV Eindhoven
	Report

Vasil Levski National Stadium, Sofia

12 December 2013
19:00

Dinamo Zagreb (Croatia)	v	(Bulgaria) Ludogorets Razgrad
	Report

Stadion Maksimir, Zagreb
12 December 2013
19:00

PSV Eindhoven (Netherlands)	v	(Ukraine) Chornomorets Odesa
	Report

Philips Stadion, Eindhoven

Notes

1. Ludogorets Razgrad will play their home matches at Vasil Levski National Stadium, Sofia instead of their regular stadium, Ludogorets Arena, Razgrad.
