= 2013 Croatian Football Super Cup =

| Dinamo Zagreb | Hajduk Split |
| 1 | 1 |
- Dinamo Zagreb won 4–1 on penalties
- Date: 6 July 2013
- Venue: Stadion Maksimir, Zagreb
- Referee: Ante Vučemilović (Osijek)
- Attendance: 12,000
- Weather: Light Rain; 20 °C (68 °F)

The 2013 Croatian Football Super Cup was the tenth edition of the Croatian Football Super Cup, a football match contested by the winners of the previous season's Croatian First League and Croatian Football Cup competitions. The match was played on 6 July 2013 at Stadion Maksimir between 2012–13 Croatian First League winners Dinamo Zagreb and 2012–13 Croatian Football Cup winners Hajduk Split.

== Match details ==
6 July 2013
20:30

| Dinamo Zagreb | 1–1 | Hajduk Split |
|---|---|---|
| Čop 34' | Report (in Croatian) | Caktaš 76' (pen.) |
Penalties
| Šimunić (penalty scored); Čop (penalty scored); Halilović (penalty scored); Antolić (penalty scored) | 4–1 | (penalty scored) Vršajević; (penalty missed) Jozinović; (penalty missed) Tomičić |

Stadion Maksimir, Zagreb
Attendance: 12,000
Referee: Ante Vučemilović (Osijek)

| Dinamo Zagreb | Hajduk Split |

| GK | 22 | (Argentina) Pablo Migliore |
| FW | 2 | (Algeria) El Arbi Hillel Soudani |
| DF | 3 | (Argentina) Luis Ibáñez |
| DF | 4 | (Croatia) Josip Šimunić (c) |
| MF | 6 | (Croatia) Arijan Ademi |
| FW | 11 | (Chile) Junior Fernándes | | (substituted off) 77' |
| DF | 13 | (Ghana) Lee Addy | (yellow card) 57' |
| DF | 16 | (Croatia) Tin Jedvaj |
| MF | 17 | (Bosnia and Herzegovina) Said Husejinović | | (substituted off) 82' |
| MF | 77 | (Croatia) Marcelo Brozović | | (substituted off) 90+3' |
| FW | 90 | (Croatia) Duje Čop |
Substitutes:
| MF | 8 | (Croatia) Domagoj Antolić | | (substituted on) 68' |
| MF | 28 | (Croatia) Alen Halilović | | (substituted on) 77' |
| FW | 15 | (Croatia) Andrej Kramarić | | (substituted on) 90+3' |
Manager:
(Croatia) Krunoslav Jurčić

| GK | 91 | (Croatia) Lovre Kalinić |
| DF | 4 | (Croatia) Antonio Milić |
| DF | 5 | (Croatia) Goran Milović |
| DF | 6 | (Bosnia and Herzegovina) Avdija Vršajević |
| MF | 7 | (Croatia) Mislav Anđelković |
| MF | 8 | (Croatia) Mario Pašalić | | (substituted off) 70' |
| FW | 14 | (Croatia) Tonći Mujan | | (substituted off) 85' |
| DF | 17 | (Croatia) Goran Jozinović (c) | (yellow card) 26' |
| MF | 18 | (Croatia) Mijo Caktaš |
| FW | 33 | (Croatia) Tomislav Kiš | | (substituted off) 55' |
| FW | 77 | (Ivory Coast) Jean Evrard Kouassi |
Substitutes:
| MF | 20 | (Croatia) Ivan Tomičić | | (substituted on) 55' |
| MF | 31 | (Belgium) Tino-Sven Sušić | | (substituted on) 70' |
| DF | 2 | (Croatia) Dino Mikanović | | (substituted on) 85' |
Manager:
(Croatia) Igor Tudor

Assistant referees:
Borut Križarić (Čakovec)
Siniša Premužaj (Varaždin)
Fourth official:
Tihomir Pejin (Donji Miholjac)

Match rules

- 90 minutes.
- Penalty shoot-out if scores still level; no extra time.
- Seven named substitutes.
- Maximum of three substitutions.
