= Luis Ibáñez =

Argentine footballer (born 1988)

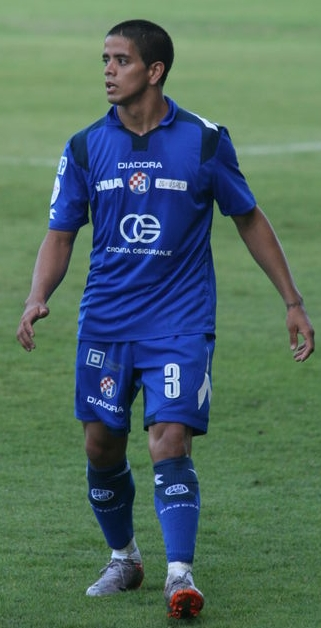
- Ibáñez playing for Dinamo Zagreb in 2010

Personal information
- Full name: Luis Ezequiel Ibáñez
- Date of birth: 15 July 1988 (age 38)
- Place of birth: Moreno, Buenos Aires, Argentina
- Height: 1.70 m (5 ft 7 in)
- Position: Left back

Team information
- Current team: Jarun
- Number: 88

Youth career
- –2008: Boca Juniors

Senior career*
Years	Team	Apps	(Gls)
2008	Boca Juniors	2	(0)
2008–2015	Dinamo Zagreb	119	(13)
2013–2014	→ Racing Club (loan)	16	(0)
2015	Győri ETO	11	(0)
2015–2016	Red Star Belgrade	31	(9)
2016–2019	Trabzonspor	10	(0)
2017–2018	→ Kardemir Karabükspor (loan)	21	(0)
2019–2021	Zrinjski Mostar	15	(0)
2021–2023	Grafičar Beograd	61	(6)
2023–2025	Jarun	40	(2)
Total		326	(30)
- * Club domestic league appearances and goals as of 25 June 2023

Luis Ezequiel Ibáñez (born 15 July 1988), nicknamed Lucho, is an Argentine professional footballer who plays as a left-back for Croatian club Jarun.

Ibáñez started his professional career at Boca Juniors in his native Argentina, debuting for the club in 2008. He made only two official appearances in Argentine Primera División, and in the summer transfer window of the 2008–09 season, he joined Dinamo Zagreb for a fee of €650,000. His first season at Dinamo Zagreb went well, as he was praised by the Croatian football critics for his performances and work rate on the pitch. He made a total of 119 official appearances for Dinamo Zagreb, scored 13 goals, and also won fourteen domestic trophies, seven of which were league titles, five of Croatian Cup and Supercup double.

After seven years of playing at Dinamo, Ibáñez left the Croatian club and shortly after signed with Hungarian club Győri ETO. After Győri ETO, he also played at Red Star Belgrade, Trabzonspor, and was on loan from Trabzonspor to Kardemir Karabükspor. In September 2019, he signed with Bosnian Premier League club Zrinjski Mostar. Ibáñez left Zrinjski in June 2021.

He also holds Croatian citizenship and is therefore not considered a foreign player in the EU.

== Background ==
Luis Ezequiel Ibáñez is an Argentine, born on 15 July 1988 in Moreno, Buenos Aires to Jorge and Alejandra. His parents are divorced and he currently resides with his father in Zagreb, Croatia. He has three younger sisters, Carla, Camilla and Valentina who along with their mother live in Argentina. Since their mother is currently unemployed, Ibáñez financially supports his family. He is engaged to Mateja Alegić, an economics student and a daughter of the Croatian entrepreneur Darko Alegić. The two have been in a relationship since June 2009 having previously met via online chat.

According to the official webpage of Dinamo Zagreb, Ibáñez is 170 cm (5 ft 7 in) tall, and weighs 69 kg (152 lbs or 10.9 stone). Besides speaking his native Spanish, Ibáñez is also fluent in Croatian. While in Dinamo Zagreb, he was a translator for South American players who were unable to understand or speak Croatian. He is also known for having a tattooed autograph of a former Argentine football player Diego Maradona on his shoulder.

On 24 December 2010, Ibáñez announced that he had submitted a request to obtain Croatian citizenship which would make him eligible to play for the country's national football team, he had earlier declared himself willing to compete for Croatia instead of Argentina at international level.

== Club career ==
=== Boca Juniors ===
Ibáñez started playing football professionally for Boca Juniors in Argentine Primera División, making his official debut for the club on 19 April 2008 in a 2–1 win against Newell's Old Boys. Ibáñez featured in another league match on 17 May, again in a 2–1 win, this time against Racing Club. Just as he started his breakthrough to the first team squad of Boca Juniors, he heard that the Croatian league club Dinamo Zagreb was interested in signing him. After consulting with his family and agent, he decided to accept the offer from Dinamo Zagreb and continue his footballing career in Europe. The transfer worth €650,000 was arranged on 11 June and Ibáñez officially joined Dinamo Zagreb two weeks later.

=== Dinamo Zagreb ===
==== First season ====
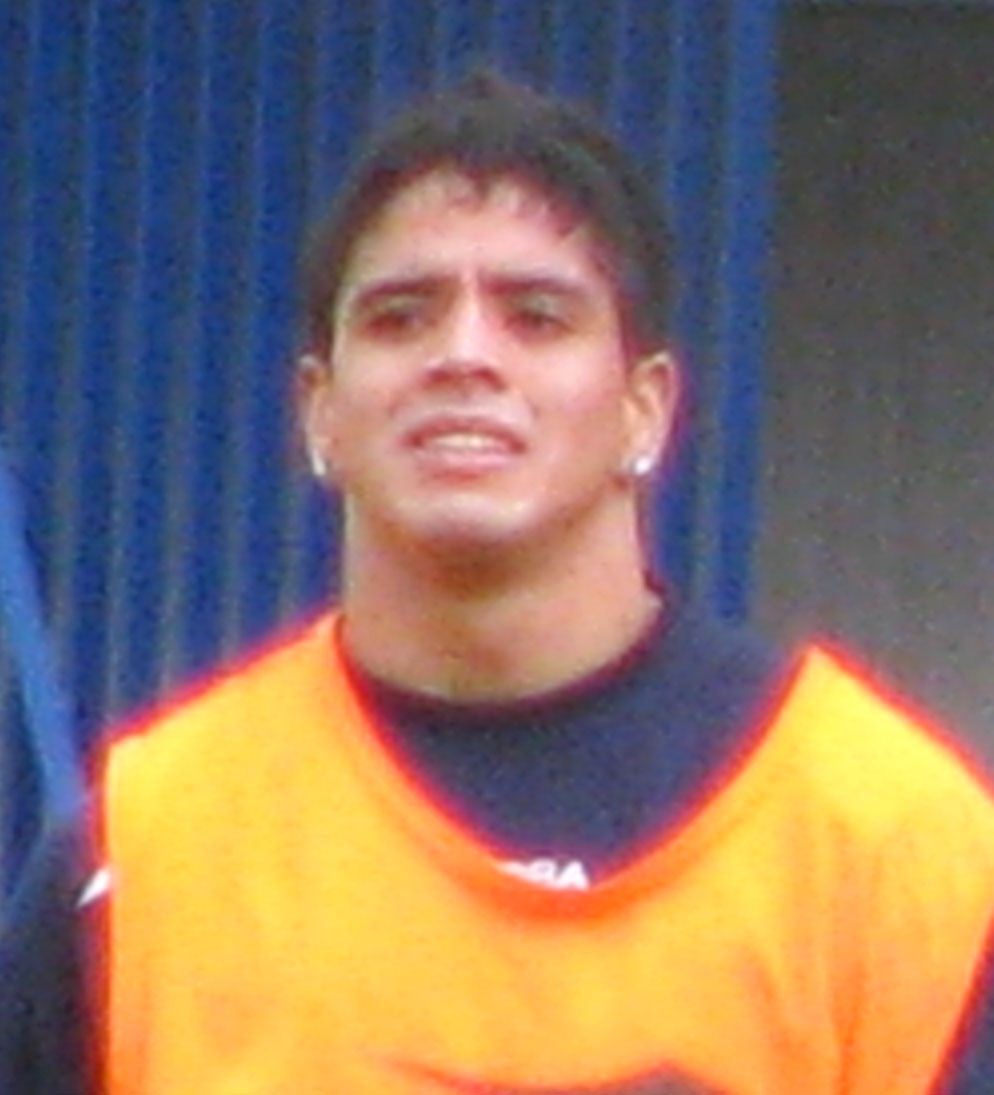
Ibáñez in 2008

On 25 June 2008, Ibáñez signed a five-year contract worth €300,000 per annum with Dinamo Zagreb along with fellow Argentine footballer Guillermo Suárez who was transferred from Club Atlético Tigre. The two were also the first ever Argentine men's footballers to play for the club. He was presented to the Croatian media as a successor to Hrvoje Čale and competition to Carlos Santos on the left back position, and was issued a number 3 jersey. The club then signed another left flank player Mirko Hrgović on 18 July, who would quickly establish himself as a first-choice left back for the club, which eventually saw Ibáñez failing to make an appearance in a couple of early season matches. He was meant to play in his first official match for the club on 23 July in the Champions League first qualifying round against Linfield, but was disrupted by a shoulder injury. His debut appearance for Dinamo Zagreb came on 17 August in a 6–0 league win against Cibalia. Eleven days later, he also debuted in the Champions League, making an appearance as a substitute in a 3–1 defeat against Shakhtar Donetsk. Soon he established himself as a first team regular and was subject to constant praise by the Croatian football critics for his performances and commitment to the club. Ibáñez played in his first Eternal derby on 21 September which Dinamo Zagreb lost 2–0 at home grounds. On 19 October he scored his first goal for the club in a league match against Šibenik from a 45-yard direct free kick which made the final score 2–2. On 23 October he played in the club's first UEFA Cup group match against NEC, which Dinamo Zagreb won 3–2. After the match, NEC manager Mario Been said that Ibáñez was among the Dinamo Zagreb players that impressed him the most with their game. He was named the man of the match for his performance in the club's third UEFA Cup group match on 27 November which ended in a 1–0 defeat against Spartak Moscow. After the match, he released a press comment stating that he grew as a player since arriving at the club and that he is pleased with how fast he was able to adapt to the new team. His last match in 2008 came on 7 December in a 3–1 league win against NK Zagreb.

His next appearance, and first in 2009, came almost three months later, on 1 March in a league match against Slaven Belupo. After that he made a string of six consecutive appearances in the league, which ended with a match against Inter Zaprešić on 11 April. He made three more appearances before the end of the season, reaching a total number of 23 league appearances for the club, five of which he made an appearance as a substitute. He also started in all of the club's UEFA Cup matches. The club went on to win the double, and Ibáñez helped with 7 appearances in the Croatian Cup, also scoring a goal against Hrvatski dragovoljac in the second round of the competition. On 13 May in the first leg of the Cup finals against Hajduk Split he came into the match as a late substitute, while he failed to make an appearance in the second leg a fortnight later. He made a total of 37 appearances throughout his first season with the club, scored two goals and made one assist. In the post-season break he picked up an injury which then ruled him out for three months.

==== 2009–2015 ====
Ibáñez made his first appearance of the new season and marked his return following an off-season injury on 8 August in a league match against Croatia Sesvete which Dinamo Zagreb won 5–2. His next appearance came one month later, in a league tie against Inter Zaprešić on 12 September. On 5 November he played his first European match of the season in the fourth round of 2009–10 UEFA Europa League group stage against Ajax.

On 25 November he scored a goal against Pomorac in the first leg of 2009–10 Croatian Cup quarterfinals. In Europa League, he played full match in 1–0 away win against Anderlecht on 2 December and featured in 2–1 home defeat against FC Timişoara on 17 December. He made only 9 league appearances for the club before the winter break, the last one being against Međimurje on 6 December.

"Ibáñez is the best Croatian left back since Robert Jarni. To all the others, he's a color television."

— Zdravko Mamić, executive vice president of Dinamo Zagreb.

He made his first appearance in the 2010 on 27 February in a 6–0 league win over Croatia Sesvete. Ibáñez then played full 90 minutes in five consecutive league matches until 3 April when he got injured in a match against Rijeka. He sustained a broken mandible in a collision with Alen Pamić during an aerial challenge. Despite the injury Ibáñez decided to play in the Croatian Cup semifinals against Hajduk Split. He played until the 79th minute of the match when he was substituted. After the match, he underwent surgery, although he reportedly asked manager Jurčić to play one more league match against Lokomotiva. He returned to action on 1 May in a league match against Hajduk Split which ended in a goalless draw. Ibáñez made a total of 18 league appearances in his second consecutive title-winning season with the club. In Croatian Cup, he featured in six matches and scored one goal.

The 2010–11 season for Ibáñez started on 13 July when he played in a 5–1 home win against FC Koper in the second qualifying round of the Champions League. On 17 July he won his first title of the season, making an appearance as a substitute in 2010 Croatian Supercup match against Hajduk Split which Dinamo Zagreb won 1–0. On 24 July he played the whole match in a 4–1 win against Hrvatski Dragovoljac on the opening matchday of the 2010–11 Prva HNL. Ibáñez featured in both of the club's Champions League third qualifying round matches against Sheriff Tiraspol which Dinamo Zagreb lost on penalties after an aggregate result was 2–2. He also successfully took a penalty during the shootout for a 4–3 score. On 30 October he scored a goal in injury time in a league match against Inter Zaprešić for the final score 3–0. He scored one more against Hrvatski dragovoljac three weeks later.

The 2011–12 season started brightly for Ibañez as he scored in a league match against Cibalia in the Prva HNL and against HJK Helsinki in Champions League qualifying. He then made a string of impressive performances, assisting for the second goal in a 4–1 win against Malmö FF in the Champions League Play-off and scoring the equalizer in a 1–1 draw against Hajduk Split and twice in a 7–0 win against NK Varaždin.

On 1 August 2013 it has been officially confirmed that GNK Dinamo Zagreb would loan out Ibáñez to Argentinian side Racing Club for a year. With the arrival of Ruben Lima and a total of three trained left-backs in the team, Dinamo had the choice to either keep Luis Ibáñez or Josip Pivarić. They eventually opted for the latter. It is not known whether the departure of Ibáñez had anything to do with the previous, hasty leaving of goalkeeper and fellow countryman, Pablo Migliore, only a few days earlier. Migliore had apparently been recommended to Dinamo by none other than Ibáñez. During 2013/2014 season Ibanez was mostly substitute for Josip Pivarić. He wanted to find another club.

=== Győri ETO ===
On January 28, 2015, it was announced that Ibáñez joined the ranks of Győri ETO. However, on April 9, 2015, Győri's largest investor, Quaestor, went bankrupt. This resulted in the virtual liquidation of the club, and resulted in almost all of its players, including Ibáñez, to leave.

=== Red Star Belgrade ===
On 7 July 2015, he signed a three-year contract with Red Star Belgrade. After first games he was considered Red Star's best player, and started to be a fan favorite because of his fight spirit, work rate, great free kick, pace and energy. But after a remarkable game and win against Čukarički in round 5 of the Serbian Superliga, with a comeback at Rajko Mitić Stadium, where he scored two goals and assist for the third, fans applauded him. First goal was from direct free kick, second from a penalty and assist was a pass from his side of the pitch. In the first 5 games Ibáñez scored two goals and assisted 4 times. He also suffered muscle injury.

=== Trabzonspor ===
In August 2016, Ibáñez signed with Turkish Süper Lig club Trabzonspor. Only one year after playing at Trabzonspor and making only 5 league appearances, he was loaned to Kardemir Karabükspor. After one more season at Trabzonspor, Ibáñez decided to leave the club in the summer of 2019.

=== Zrinjski Mostar ===
On 17 September 2019, Ibáñez came back to the Balkans after three years and signed a two-year contract with Bosnian Premier League club Zrinjski Mostar, making him not only one of the biggest ever signings of Zrinjski, but of the whole league as well. He made his official debut for Zrinjski on 2 October 2019, in a 2–0 home win against Sloboda Tuzla in a cup game. He played his first league game for Zrinjski in a 0–0 home draw against FK Sarajevo on 5 October 2019. Ibáñez left Zrinjski in June 2021 after his contract with the club expired.

== International career ==
Ibáñez was not capped for Argentina at senior level, but he was made aware by the national team staff that they will consider calling him up when he gets older and if he keeps playing well. He also stated that he would like to play for Croatia.

== Style of play ==
Ibáñez prefers to play on the left flank, either as a full-back or winger and considers himself equally adept at both positions. Since his arrival, he has been praised by Croatian media for his work rate, pace, agility, technical skills and shot power. His powerful left foot shot is considered as his main attribute by the critics. He is also noted for being an excellent direct free kick taker. He was the usual set-piece taker whilst in the reserve team at Boca Juniors. He quickly arose to popularity due to his constant commitment on the field and for always giving his best. Dinamo Zagreb's executive vice president Zdravko Mamić once stated that Ibáñez is best Croatian left back since Robert Jarni, despite player not having Croatian citizenship at the time.

== Career statistics ==
=== Club ===
As of match played 20 March 2021.

Appearances and goals by club, season and competition
Club	Season	League			Cup (Note: Includes Croatian Cup and Croatian Super Cup.)		Continental		Total	
Club	Season	Division	Apps	Goals	Apps	Goals	Apps	Goals	Apps	Goals
Boca Juniors	2007–08	Argentine Primera División	2	0	— (Note: The Argentine Football Association did not organise a cup competition for the Argentine football clubs at the time.)		0	0	2	0
Dinamo Zagreb	2008–09	Prva HNL	23	1	7	1	7	0	37	2
Dinamo Zagreb	2009–10	Prva HNL	18	0	6	1	3	0	27	1
Dinamo Zagreb	2010–11	Prva HNL	22	2	5	1	10	0	37	3
Dinamo Zagreb	2011–12	Prva HNL	26	7	3	1	11	1	40	9
Dinamo Zagreb	2012–13	Prva HNL	20	2	1	0	6	1	27	3
Dinamo Zagreb	2013–14	Prva HNL	1	0	1	0	1	0	3	0
Dinamo Zagreb	2014–15	Prva HNL	9	1	2	0	3	0	14	1
Dinamo Zagreb	Total		119	13	25	4	41	2	185	19
Racing Club (loan)	2013–14	Argentine Primera División	16	0	—		0	0	16	0
Győri ETO	2014–15	Nemzeti Bajnokság I	11	0	0	0	0	0	11	0
Red Star Belgrade	2015–16	Serbian SuperLiga	31	9	2	1	0	0	33	10
Red Star Belgrade	2016–17	Serbian SuperLiga	0	0	0	0	4	1	4	1
Red Star Belgrade	Total		31	9	2	1	4	1	37	11
Trabzonspor	2016–17	Süper Lig	5	0	4	0	—		9	0
Trabzonspor	2018–19	Süper Lig	5	0	6	0	—		11	0
Trabzonspor	Total		10	0	10	0	0	0	20	0
Kardemir Karabükspor (loan)	2017–18	Süper Lig	21	0	1	0	—		22	0
Zrinjski Mostar	2019–20	Bosnian Premier League	7	0	2	0	—		9	0
Zrinjski Mostar	2020–21	Bosnian Premier League	8	0	1	0	2	0	11	0
Zrinjski Mostar	Total		15	0	3	0	2	0	20	0
Career total			225	22	41	5	47	3	313	30

== Honours ==
Dinamo Zagreb

- Prva HNL: 2008–09, 2009–10, 2010–11, 2011–12, 2012–13
- Croatian Cup: 2008–09, 2010–11, 2011–12
- Croatian Super Cup: 2010, 2013

Red Star Belgrade

- Serbian SuperLiga: 2015–16

Individual

- Serbian SuperLiga Team of the Season: 2015–16
