= Filip Bradarić =

Croatian footballer (born 1992)

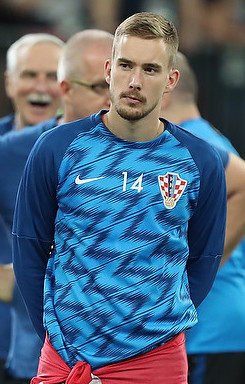
- Bradarić following Croatia's defeat in the 2018 FIFA World Cup final

Personal information
- Full name: Filip Bradarić
- Date of birth: 11 January 1992 (age 34)
- Place of birth: Split, Croatia
- Height: 1.86 m (6 ft 1 in)
- Position: Defensive midfielder

Youth career
- 2003–2010: Hajduk Split

Senior career*
Years	Team	Apps	(Gls)
2011–2015	Hajduk Split	38	(2)
2011–2013	→ Primorac 1929 (loan)	55	(8)
2015–2018	Rijeka	103	(7)
2018–2021	Cagliari	27	(0)
2019–2020	→ Hajduk Split (loan)	9	(0)
2020	→ Celta Vigo (loan)	14	(0)
2020–2021	→ Al-Ain (loan)	25	(1)
2021–2022	Al-Ahli	26	(2)
2023–2024	Zrinjski Mostar	12	(0)

International career
2010	Croatia U19	2	(0)
2014	Croatia U21	3	(0)
2016–2019	Croatia	6	(0)
Medal record
Men's football
Representing Croatia
FIFA World Cup
Runner-up	2018 Russia
- * Club domestic league appearances and goals as of 3 May 2024

Filip Bradarić (Croatian pronunciation: [fǐlip brǎdaritɕ]; born 11 January 1992) is a Croatian former professional footballer who played as a defensive midfielder.

== Club career ==
=== Hajduk Split ===
Having passed through the ranks of the Hajduk Split youth academy, Bradarić was loaned in the summer of 2011 to the Treća HNL Jug side NK Primorac 1929 for two seasons, and there he was a first-team fixture both in the third and the second tier of Croatian football. In the summer of 2013, he joined Hajduk's first team under the coach Igor Tudor, making his Prva HNL debut on 13 July 2013, coming in the 73rd minute of his club's 5–1 away win vs. NK Zadar for Tonći Mujan.

=== Rijeka ===
On 3 February 2015 Bradarić signed a 3 1/2-year deal with HNK Rijeka. On 5 May 2017, HNK Rijeka and Bradarić agreed to a contract extension until June 2020.

=== Cagliari ===
On 3 August 2018 he signed a five-year contract with Cagliari, thus beginning his first experience abroad. In the Sardinian team he joined his countrymen Darijo Srna and Marko Pajač.

== International career ==
In November 2016, Bradarić received his first call-up to the senior Croatia squad for matches against Iceland and Northern Ireland. He made his debut in a friendly against Northern Ireland on 15 November 2016.

In May 2018, he was named in Croatia's preliminary 32 man squad for the 2018 FIFA World Cup in Russia. On 4 June 2018, Bradarić was included in Croatia's final World Cup squad. On 26 June 2018, he came on as a substitute for Luka Modrić in the 65th minute of the 2018 FIFA World Cup match against Iceland, becoming the third player in HNK Rijeka's history to feature in the FIFA World Cup.

== Career statistics ==
=== Club ===
As of 19 July 2020

Club	Season	League			National cup		Continental		Total	
Club	Season	Division	Apps	Goals	Apps	Goals	Apps	Goals	Apps	Goals
Primorac 1929 (loan)	2011–12	Treća HNL	28	2	–		–		28	2
Primorac 1929 (loan)	2012–13	Druga HNL	27	6	–		–		27	6
Primorac 1929 (loan)	Total		103	7	15	1	14	0	132	8
Hajduk Split	2013–14	Prva HNL	25	1	4	1	1	0	30	2
Hajduk Split	2014–15	Prva HNL	13	1	2	0	3	0	18	1
Hajduk Split	Total		103	7	15	1	14	0	132	8
Rijeka	2014–15	Prva HNL	15	1	2	0	–		17	1
Rijeka	2015–16	Prva HNL	26	1	5	1	2	0	33	2
Rijeka	2016–17	Prva HNL	33	2	6	0	1	0	40	2
Rijeka	2017–18	Prva HNL	29	3	2	0	11	0	42	3
Rijeka	Total		103	7	15	1	14	0	132	8
Cagliari	2018–19	Serie A	27	0	2	0	–		29	0
Hajduk Split (loan)	2019–20	Prva HNL	9	0	1	0	–		10	0
Celta Vigo (loan)	2019–20	La Liga	14	0	0	0	–		14	0
Career total			246	17	24	2	18	0	288	19

=== International ===
As of 15 October 2018

National team	Year	Apps	Goals
Croatia	2016	1	0
Croatia	2017	1	0
Croatia	2018	4	0
Total		6	0

== Honours ==
Rijeka

- Croatian First League: 2016–17
- Croatian Cup: 2016–17

Zrinjski Mostar

- Bosnian Cup: 2023–24

Croatia

- FIFA World Cup runner-up: 2018

Orders

- Order of Duke Branimir: 2018

Futsal

- Torcida Kup: 2024
