= Ismar Hairlahović =

Bosnian footballer

Personal information
- Date of birth: 4 March 1996 (age 30)
- Place of birth: Cazin, Bosnia and Herzegovina
- Height: 1.80 m (5 ft 11 in)
- Position: Midfielder

Team information
- Current team: Bjelovar
- Number: 4

Youth career
- 2003–2010: Krajina Cazin
- 2011: Croatia Lički Osik
- 2011–2015: Hajduk Split

Senior career*
Years	Team	Apps	(Gls)
2014–2017	Hajduk Split	1	(0)
2014–2015	→ Hajduk Split B	38	(3)
2016	→ Dugopolje (loan)	7	(0)
2017–2018	Sloboda Tuzla	2	(0)
2018–2019	Zrinjski Mostar	14	(0)
2019	→ Radnik Bijeljina (loan)	11	(0)
2019	Zvijezda 09	9	(0)
2020	Međimurje	4	(0)
2021	Zlatibor	13	(0)
2022-	Bjelovar	6	(1)

International career
2012	Bosnia and Herzegovina U17	3	(0)
2014–2015	Bosnia and Herzegovina U19	5	(0)
- * Club domestic league appearances and goals as of 19 May 2022

Ismar Hairlahović (born 4 March 1996) is a Bosnian professional footballer who plays as a central midfielder.

== Club career ==
Born in Cazin, he joined the youth ranks of the local FK Krajina Cazin, aged 7. Moving up the ranks, he started training with the Bubamara academy from Sarajevo, run by the former Yugoslav international Predrag Pašić, his talent receiving recognition early when he was selected in Bosnia and Herzegovina's selection for his age in 2009. While he was supposed to move to Sarajevo after finishing elementary school, he was scouted by HNK Hajduk Split and moved to Croatia, following in the footsteps of his idol Senijad Ibričić

A regular in the Hajduk youth teams and Bosnia and Herzegovina youth selections, in May 2013 he impressed the new Hajduk first team coach, the former Croatia international Igor Tudor so much he invited him, along with Tonći Mujan to train with the first team squad, not long after his 17th birthday. He would have to wait, however, one more year for his first team debut, coming in the last minutes of the 11.05.2014 4–2 home win against NK Osijek for Chelsea F.C.-bound Mario Pašalić, who was playing his last game in front of Hajduk's home crowd before moving to England.

He later played for FK Zvijezda 09 in the Premier League of Bosnia and Herzegovina.

== Honours ==
=== Club ===
Zrinjski Mostar

- Bosnian Premier League: 2017–18
