= Alen Halilović =

Croatian footballer (born 1996)

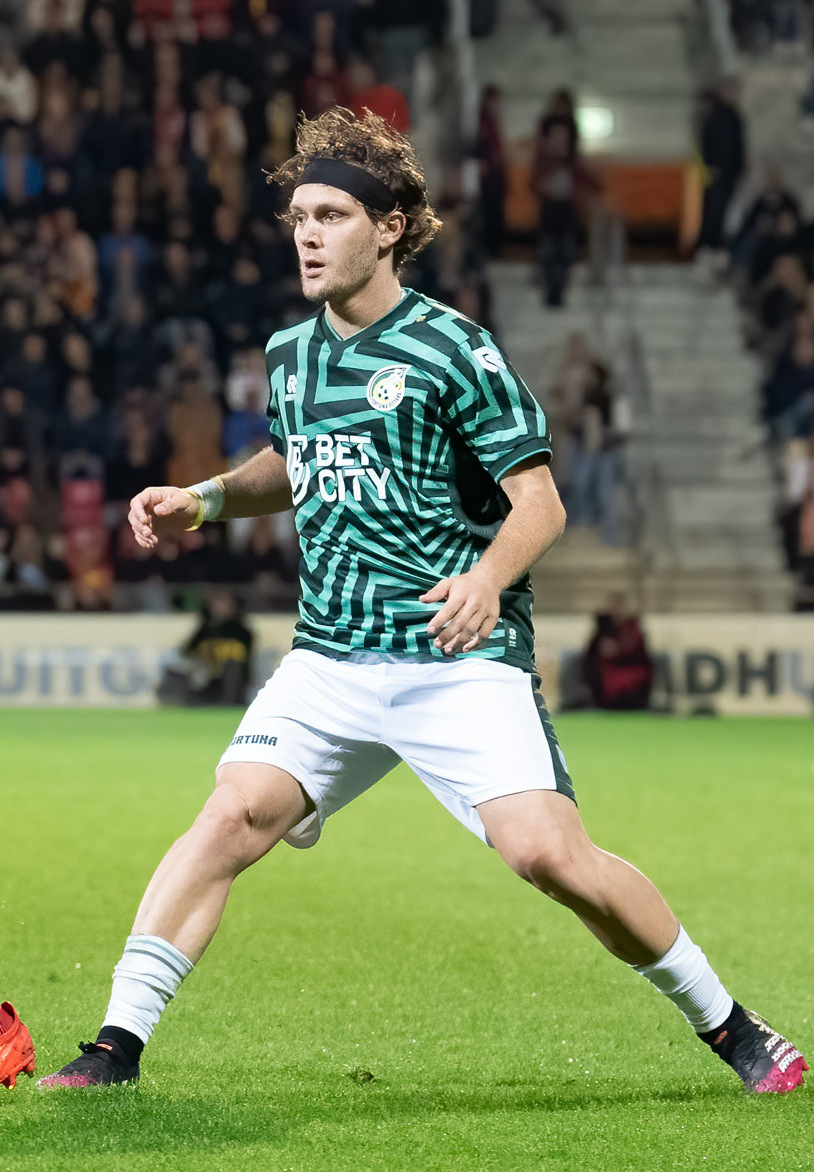
- Halilović with Fortuna Sittard in 2023

Personal information
- Date of birth: 18 June 1996 (age 30)
- Place of birth: Dubrovnik, Croatia
- Height: 1.69 m (5 ft 7 in)
- Position: Attacking midfielder

Youth career
- Dinamo Zagreb

Senior career*
Years	Team	Apps	(Gls)
2012–2014	Dinamo Zagreb	44	(7)
2014–2015	Barcelona B	30	(4)
2014–2016	Barcelona	0	(0)
2015–2016	→ Sporting Gijón (loan)	36	(3)
2016–2018	Hamburger SV	6	(0)
2017–2018	→ Las Palmas (loan)	38	(2)
2018–2020	AC Milan	0	(0)
2019	→ Standard Liège (loan)	14	(0)
2019–2020	→ Heerenveen (loan)	17	(1)
2020–2021	Birmingham City	17	(1)
2021–2022	Reading	11	(1)
2022–2023	Rijeka	8	(1)
2023–2026	Fortuna Sittard	63	(6)

International career^{‡}
2010	Croatia U14	2	(1)
2010–2011	Croatia U15	6	(3)
2012	Croatia U16	4	(1)
2012–2013	Croatia U17	13	(3)
2014–2019	Croatia U21	17	(4)
2013–2019	Croatia	10	(0)
- * Club domestic league appearances and goals as of 21 May 2026 ‡ National team caps and goals as of 21 June 2019

Alen Halilović (Croatian pronunciation: [ǎlen xalǐːloʋitɕ]; born 18 June 1996) is a Croatian professional footballer who plays as an attacking midfielder. A product of Croatia's youth levels, he represented the senior team in 10 matches from 2013 to 2019, debuting as their youngest-ever player (aged 16).

In March 2014, Barcelona reached an agreement with Dinamo Zagreb for a five-year transfer to the club. He made one appearance for the senior team (in the Copa del Rey), spending most of the season with the B-team. He then had a season-long loan to Sporting Gijón, before signing for Hamburg in July 2016. He spent much of the next two seasons on loan to Las Palmas before joining AC Milan. He went on loan spells with Standard Liège and Heerenveen. Having left Milan after contract termination in October 2020, he signed with Birmingham City in 2020, then Reading in 2021 and Rijeka in 2022 all on brief spells. In 2023, he moved to Fortuna Sittard until 2026.

== Club career ==
=== Dinamo Zagreb ===
On 27 September 2012, he made his debut for the first team in the "Eternal derby" win over Hajduk Split (3–1), when he replaced Sammir for the final ten minutes of the match. This made him the youngest debutant in the history of Dinamo Zagreb, at the age of 16 years and 101 days. In the next round match against Slaven Belupo, he again came off the bench and scored the final goal in a 4–1 victory. This made him the youngest goalscorer in the history of the league, at the age of 16 years and 112 days – breaking the record set in November 2010 by his teammate, Mateo Kovačić. The record would last until 22 May 2021, when Lovro Zvonarek broke it by scoring his first goal aged 16 years and 14 days. In November 2012, Halilović scored his second league goal for Dinamo in a 5–0 win against NK Zadar, from outside of the box on an assist provided by Kovačić. In his first professional season with Dinamo, he also managed to participate in UEFA Champions League. On 24 October 2012, he made his European debut in the 90th minute of the encounter against the French team Paris Saint-Germain at Maksimir Stadium, coming on as a substitute for Kovačić. Thus he became the club's youngest player ever to feature in a Champions League match, and second youngest player in the history of the UEFA Champions League.

=== Barcelona ===
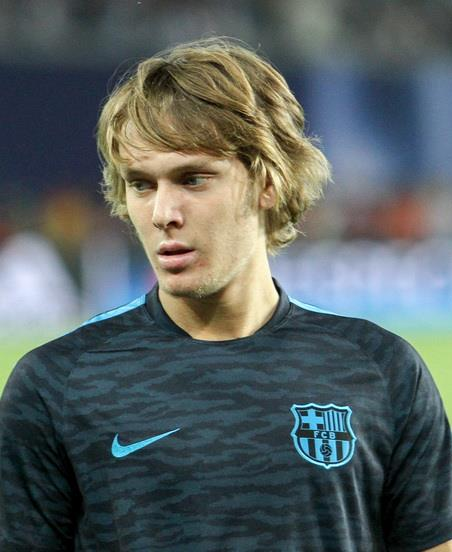
Halilović training with Barcelona in 2015.

On 27 March 2014, FC Barcelona reached an agreement with Dinamo Zagreb for Halilović to join Barcelona in July 2014 at the start of the summer transfer window. He signed a five-year contract for an initial amount of €2.2 million, set to increase if he secures a spot on the first team, and was assigned to the reserves in Segunda División.

On 2 April 2014, FIFA announced that Barcelona would be banned from buying players until summer 2015 after illegally signing underaged players, putting the move in doubt. On 23 April 2014, FC Barcelona's transfer ban was suspended pending an appeal, allowing the transfer to go ahead for the time being. On 2 May 2014, Halilović signed for Barcelona on a five-year contract for €2.2 million.

Halilović made his first appearance for Barcelona's senior team on 15 January 2015, replacing Adama Traoré for the last 28 minutes of a 4–0 away win against Elche CF in the last 16 of the Copa del Rey.

==== Loan to Sporting Gijón ====
On 21 August 2015, he was loaned to fellow league team Sporting de Gijón, in a season-long deal. On 29 August, Halilović made his La Liga debut, coming on as a second-half substitute for Carlos Carmona in a 0–0 away draw against Real Sociedad. His first goal in the category came on 3 October, opening a 2–1 win away to RCD Espanyol, and on 1 November he netted the only goal of a win against Málaga CF at El Molinón.

Halilović was a half-time substitute for Nacho Cases on 15 December in the national cup last-32 second leg and scored twice – one a penalty kick – to ensure a 3–3 home draw against Real Betis, who advanced 5–3 on aggregate.

=== Hamburger SV ===
On 19 July 2016, it was announced that Halilović would join Bundesliga side Hamburger SV for €5.5 million, with a buy-back clause for Barcelona worth €10 million. Two days later the move was confirmed, with Halilović signing a four-year deal. Halilović scored his first goal for the club on his debut in a DFB-Pokal cup match against FSV Zwickau on 22 August 2016. This was the only goal of the match and helped Hamburg to the next round. He had to wait until 10 September to make his league debut, however, which was in the second league game of the season against Bayer Leverkusen.

==== Loan to Las Palmas ====
In January 2017, Halilović joined Las Palmas for 18 months in a loan deal, with an option for Las Palmas to buy him.

In the first game of the 2017–18 season for Las Palmas, playing against Valencia, Halilović received a straight red card for a tackle on José Gayà, in the 33rd minute.

=== AC Milan ===
On 3 July 2018, Alen Halilović joined Serie A club AC Milan on a free transfer. He signed a contract until 30 June 2021.

==== Loan to Standard Liège ====
On 31 January 2019, Halilović joined Standard Liège on loan with an option to buy until 30 June 2020.

==== Loan to SC Heerenveen ====
Starting September 2019, Halilović's loan to Standard Liége got cancelled and he went on loan to the Dutch team SC Heerenveen for the duration of a year.

Following the abandonment of the Eredivisie on 24 April 2020 due to the COVID-19 pandemic, Halilović returned to Milan. On 5 October, Milan announced they terminated his contract by mutual consent.

=== Birmingham City ===
On 23 November 2020, Halilović joined EFL Championship club Birmingham City as a free agent; he signed until the end of the season. After a lengthy wait for international clearance, he made his Birmingham debut as a second-half substitute in a 1–0 win away to Bristol City on 5 December. He scored his first and only goal for Birmingham on 27 February 2021 with "a superb left-footed curler from 20 yards (18 m)" to complete a 2–1 win over Queens Park Rangers. In celebration, he took off his shirt to reveal a caricature depicting Serbian musician Đorđe Balašević, who had died eight days earlier. He made 17 league appearances, and was offered terms for the coming season, but had not signed by the time his contract expired.

=== Reading ===
Halilović signed a one-year deal with another Championship club, Reading, on 27 August 2021. On 20 May 2022, Reading confirmed that he would leave the club at the end of his contract with the club.

=== Rijeka ===
On 6 July 2022, Halilović signed for the Croatian SuperSport HNL club Rijeka on a free transfer. The club and Halilović mutually terminated his contract in January 2023.

=== Fortuna Sittard ===
On 18 July 2023, Halilović returned to the Netherlands and signed a contract with Fortuna Sittard for one year, with an option for two more. He scored his first goal for the club on 16 September 2023, in an Eredivisie match at home against FC Volendam, also grabbing his first assist.

== International career ==
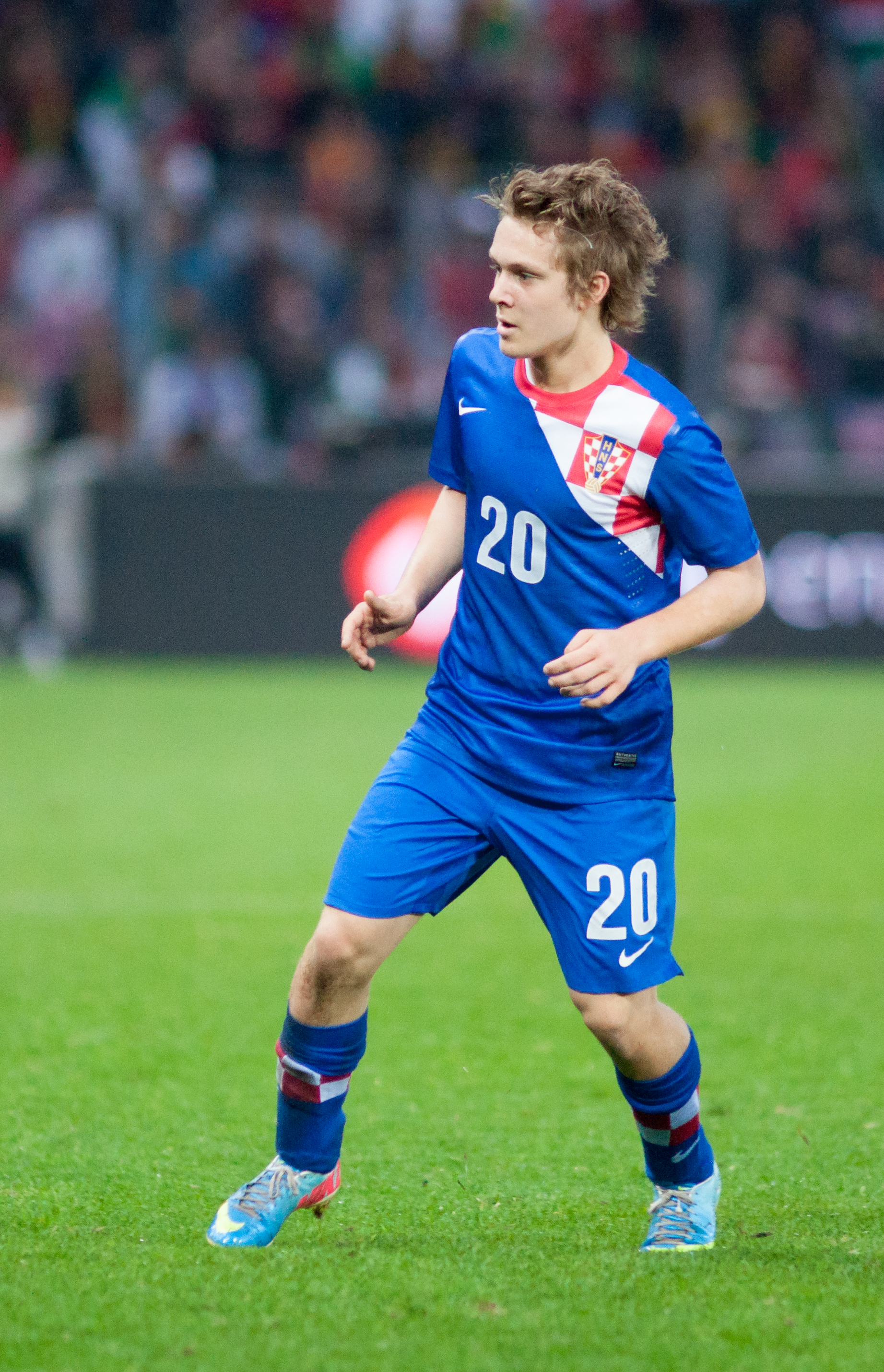
Halilović playing for Croatia in 2013

Halilović was eligible to play for Croatia or Bosnia and Herzegovina on international level, opting for the former and representing them at various youth levels. In March 2013, he was a member of Croatia U17 that qualified for the European Under-17 Championship in Slovakia. On 10 June 2013, Halilović made his debut for the senior team against Portugal in a friendly match as a 50th-minute substitute for Ivan Strinić. At age 16, he became the youngest debutant in the history of Croatia.

In 2016, ahead of Euro 2016, Halilović was left out of the 23-man squad for the tournament, reportedly taking it personally. He did not make an appearance for the national team until June 2019, when he played 30 minutes in a friendly against Tunisia. Later that month, he captained Croatia at Under-21 Euro 2019. After a heavy 4–1 loss to Romania, he was left on the bench for the remaining matches against France and England, as Croatia failed to qualify for the knockout stage.

== Personal life ==
His father, Sejad Halilović, is a former Bosnian international who also played for Dinamo Zagreb. The entire family relocated to Spain when he was signed by FC Barcelona, with his two younger brothers, Dino and Damir, also being signed to play for one of the club's youth teams. He is a supporter of Bosnian club FK Sarajevo.

== Career statistics ==
=== Club ===
As of match played 17 December 2024

Appearances and goals by club, season and competition
Club	Season	League			National cup (Note: Includes Croatian Football Cup, Copa del Rey, DFB-Pokal, Coppa Italia, Belgian Cup, KNVB Cup, FA Cup)		Europe		Other		Total	
Club	Season	Division	Apps	Goals	Apps	Goals	Apps	Goals	Apps	Goals	Apps	Goals
Dinamo Zagreb	2012–13	Prva HNL	18	2	0	0	3 (Note: Appearances in UEFA Champions League)	0	—		21	2
Dinamo Zagreb	2013–14	Prva HNL	26	5	6	1	8 (Note: Three appearances in UEFA Champions League, five in UEFA Europa League)	0	1 (Note: Appearance in Croatian Super Cup)	0	41	6
Dinamo Zagreb	Total		44	7	6	1	11	0	1	0	62	8
Barcelona B	2014–15	Segunda División	30	4	—		—		—		30	4
Barcelona	2014–15	La Liga	0	0	1	0	0	0	—		1	0
Sporting Gijón (loan)	2015–16	La Liga	36	3	1	2	—		—		37	5
Hamburger SV	2016–17	Bundesliga	6	0	1	1	—		—		7	1
Las Palmas (loan)	2016–17	La Liga	18	0	0	0	—		—		18	0
Las Palmas (loan)	2017–18	La Liga	20	2	1	0	—		—		21	2
Las Palmas (loan)	Total		38	2	1	0	—		—		39	2
AC Milan	2018–19	Serie A	0	0	0	0	3 (Note: Appearances in UEFA Europa League)	0	—		3	0
Standard Liège (loan)	2018–19	Belgian First Division A	14	0	0	0	—		—		14	0
Heerenveen (loan)	2019–20	Eredivisie	17	1	3	0	—		—		20	1
Birmingham City	2020–21	EFL Championship	17	1	0	0	—		—		17	1
Reading	2021–22	EFL Championship	11	1	1	0	—		—		12	1
Rijeka	2022–23	Prva HNL	8	1	1	0	2 (Note: Appearances in UEFA Europa Conference League)	0	—		11	1
Fortuna Sittard	2023–24	Eredivisie	31	4	3	1	—		—		34	5
Fortuna Sittard	2024–25	Eredivisie	15	2	1	0	—		—		16	2
Fortuna Sittard	Total		46	6	4	1	—		—		50	7
Career total			267	25	19	5	16	0	1	0	303	31

=== International ===
As of 18 June 2019

Appearances and goals by national team and year
National team	Year	Apps	Goals
Croatia	2013	3	0
Croatia	2014	4	0
Croatia	2015	0	0
Croatia	2016	2	0
Croatia	2017	0	0
Croatia	2018	0	0
Croatia	2019	1	0
Total		10	0

== Honours ==
Dinamo Zagreb

- Prva HNL: 2012–13, 2013–14
- Croatian Supercup: 2013

Barcelona

- Copa del Rey: 2014–15
