= Dario Tomić =

Croatian footballer (born 1987)

Personal information
- Date of birth: 23 June 1987 (age 39)
- Place of birth: Tuzla, SFR Yugoslavia
- Height: 1.80 m (5 ft 11 in)
- Position: Left-back

Youth career
- Sloboda Tuzla

Senior career*
Years	Team	Apps	(Gls)
2005–2007	Sloboda Tuzla	4	(0)
2006–2007	→ Bratstvo Gračanica (loan)		
2007–2008	Krk		
2008–2010	Novalja	47	(2)
2010–2011	Pomorac Kostrena	18	(1)
2011	HNK Gorica	10	(0)
2012	Međimurje	11	(3)
2012–2014	Hrvatski Dragovoljac	41	(2)
2014–2016	Istra 1961	44	(5)
2016–2018	Liepāja	23	(1)
2018	Titograd	9	(1)
2018	Krško	6	(0)
- * Club domestic league appearances and goals

Dario Tomić (born 23 June 1987) is a Croatian former professional footballer who played as a left-back.

== Career ==
Born in Tuzla, Tomić began his career by going through the ranks of his local side FK Sloboda Tuzla, debuting for the first team in 2005, aged 17. Sent on loan to the third-tier NK Bratstvo Gračanica, aged 19, he was a part of the team that won the 2006–07 season of the Second league of the FBH – North, and ascended to the Prva Liga FBiH.

After that season, however, he, along with his family, moved to Malinska on the island of Krk, signing for the lower-tier NK Krk.

He went on playing for several seasons in the lower tiers of Croatian football – two seasons for NK Novalja in the Treća HNL and three seasons in the Druga HNL, playing for NK Pomorac Kostrena, HNK Gorica, NK Međimurje and NK Hrvatski Dragovoljac until he achieved promotion with Dragovoljac to the Prva HNL. He made his Prva HNL debut in the first round of the 2012–13 season, playing the entire match against NK Lokomotiva in a 2–0 home loss.

Following his club's relegation in the summer of 2014, he moved to NK Istra 1961. He spent his latter years in the German lower leagues.
