= Pablo Migliore =

Argentine footballer (born 1982)

Personal information
- Full name: Pablo Alejandro Migliore
- Date of birth: January 27, 1982 (age 44)
- Place of birth: Buenos Aires, Argentina
- Height: 1.90 m (6 ft 3 in)
- Position: Goalkeeper

Senior career*
Years	Team	Apps	(Gls)
2002	Germinal de Rawson	1	(0)
2002–2006	Huracán	19	(0)
2004	→ Deportivo Madryn (loan)	13	(0)
2006–2009	Boca Juniors	13	(0)
2008–2009	→ Racing Club (loan)	24	(0)
2009–2013	San Lorenzo	118	(0)
2013	Dinamo Zagreb	2	(0)
2013–2014	Argentinos Juniors	22	(0)
2014–2015	Peñarol	29	(0)
2015–2017	Almirante Brown	34	(0)
2017	Atlético Paraná	10	(0)
2017	Barracas Central	15	(0)
- * Club domestic league appearances and goals as of 8 April 2018

Pablo Migliore (born 27 January 1982) is an Argentine football goalkeeper who most recently played for Barracas Central.

== Club career ==
Migliore started his career with Germinal de Rawson before moving to Huracán in 2003.

In 2004 Migliore was loaned to Deportivo Madryn and in 2006 he was sold to Argentine giants Boca Juniors. Since his move to Boca he failed to establish himself in the team, but he did play a small part in helping Boca to win the Clausura 2006 tournament.

On March 17, 2008, he was involved in a car accident. He was on his way back from a training together with Josué Ayala who is a goalkeeper in one of Boca's youth squads, when for an unknown reason his car crashed on the Dellepiane highway near Buenos Aires. He only had some minor injuries.

Migliore had a successful spell on loan at Racing Club for the 2008–09 season where he was able to establish himself as the first-choice goalkeeper. Racing wanted to purchase his rights following this loan, but a dispute over currency valuation scuppered the deal and led to his surprise move to San Lorenzo.

On March 31, 2013, he was jailed on suspicion of aiding and abetting a hooligan gang member wanted over the death of a man in 2011.

In late May 2013 Migliore joined GNK Dinamo Zagreb, signing a three-year contract, where he immediately became a crowd favourite. On July 25, 2013, merely two months later, Dinamo Zagreb announced that they came to a deal with Migliore to mutually agree to cancel his contract. According to Croatian media reports, Migliore had a falling out with Dinamo manager Krunoslav Jurčić after Jurčić had ultimately forbidden Migliore to keep bringing his son to trainings and the dressing room, respectively. Pablo Migliore apparently left training on the eve of Dinamo's return leg of the second qualifying round for the 2013–14 UEFA Champions League campaign against CS Fola Esch of Luxembourg, which was played in Zagreb on July 23, 2013, and only came back the day after, on match day, to bid goodbye to his teammates prior to the game. Some sources claimed that Migliore had in fact become rapidly homesick after his arrival, he furthermore increasingly worried about his father's state of health and also loudly expressed his wish to return to Argentina to play for San Lorenzo again. The falling out with Jurčić was presumably only a pretence to get a swift contract cancellation in order for him to quickly return to Argentina. Despite only a handful of competitive matches for the club, Migliore managed to help Dinamo win the 2013 Croatian Supercup title against their arch-rivals HNK Hajduk Split by saving a penalty kick during the penalty shootout.

Pablo Migliore joined Argentine Primera División club Argentinos Juniors in late July 2013.

== Titles ==
Season	Club	Title
Clausura 2006	Boca Juniors	Primera División Argentina
2006	Boca Juniors	Recopa Sudamericana
2007	Boca Juniors	Copa Libertadores
2013	GNK Dinamo Zagreb	Croatian Supercup
