= Haris Bukva =

Austrian professional footballer

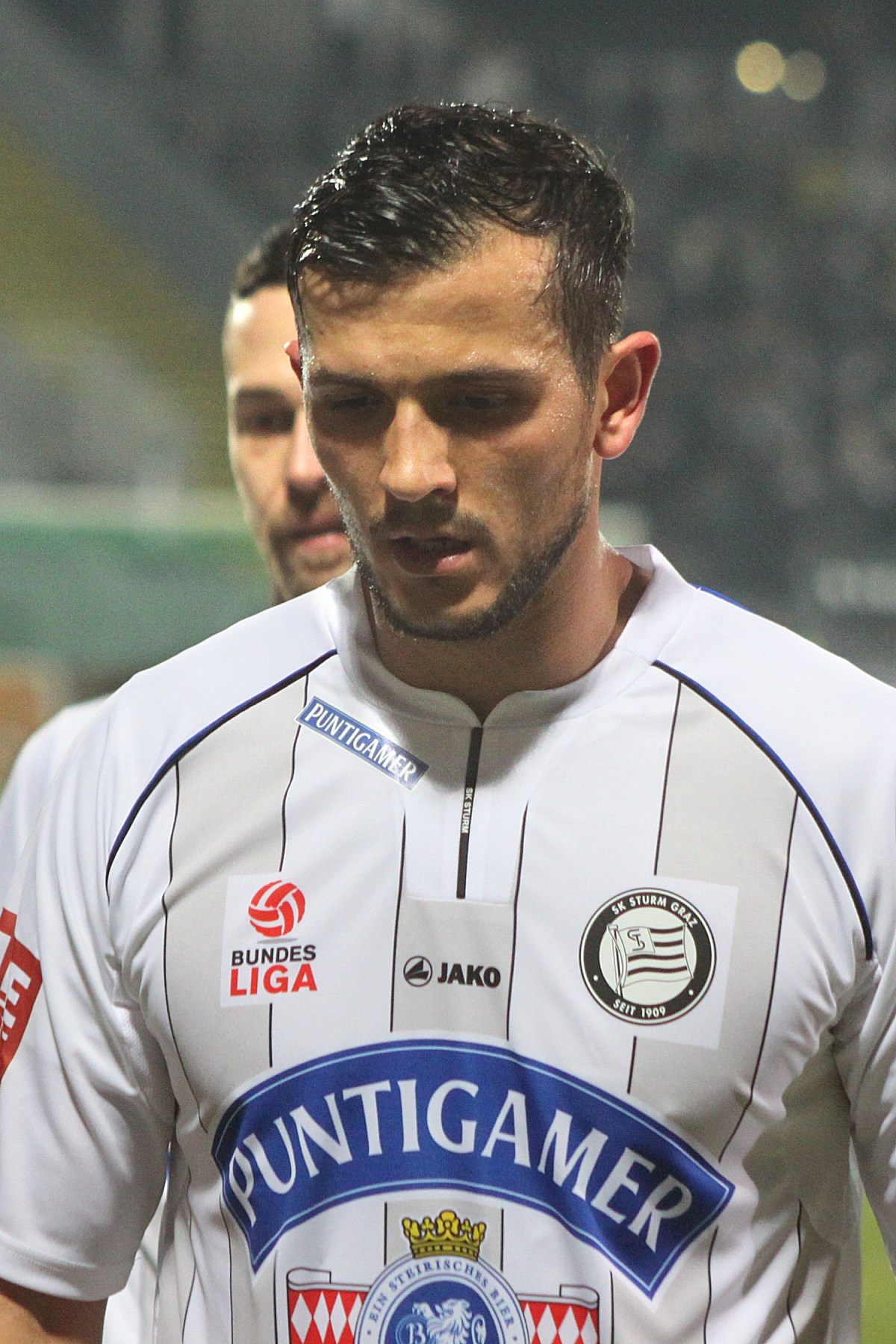

Personal information
- Date of birth: 15 March 1988 (age 38)
- Place of birth: Foča, SFR Yugoslavia
- Height: 1.85 m (6 ft 1 in)
- Position: Midfielder

Team information
- Current team: Union Schlierbach (Head coach)

Youth career
- 1998–2000: ASKÖ Doppl-Hart 74
- 2000–2007: SV Pasching (co-operation)
- 2003–2007: LASK Linz (co-operation)

Senior career*
Years	Team	Apps	(Gls)
2006–2007	SV Pasching	10	(0)
2006	→ FC Wels (loan)	11	(0)
2007–2009	Austria Kärnten	26	(2)
2009	→ FC Kärnten (loan)	17	(0)
2009–2013	Sturm Graz	73	(5)
2011	→ LASK Linz (loan)	15	(0)
2013–2014	Hajduk Split	11	(0)
2014–2015	Rot-Weiß Erfurt	25	(1)
2015	Austria Salzburg	7	(0)
2016	BV Cloppenburg	0	(0)
2016	ATSV Stadl-Paura	14	(0)
2017	WSC Hertha Wels	19	(4)
2018	Union Peuerbach	4	(0)

International career
	Austria U-19	4	(0)
	Austria U-20	4	(0)
2008–2009	Austria U-21	9	(0)

Managerial career
- 2018: Union Peuerbach (player-manager)
- 2018–: Union Schlierbach
- * Club domestic league appearances and goals

Haris Bukva (born 15 March 1988) is an Austrian retired professional footballer and current head coach of Union Schlierbach.

He formerly played for SV Pasching, SK Austria Kärnten, SK Sturm Graz and was on loan to FC Wels, FC Kärnten and LASK Linz. He made his Hajduk debut on 14 September in a 2–0 home win against Dinamo Zagreb, assisting both goals from a corner kick. In February 2016, he had a very short spell at German fourth tier side BV Cloppenburg.

== Career ==
=== Club career ===
Bukva has both Austrian and Bosnian-Herzegovinian citizenship. He began his career in the youth of LASK Linz. In 2005 he was promoted into the first team squad. In 2006 he moved to SV Pasching in the Austrian Football Bundesliga. In the same year he also made his debut with the Pasching team. Bukva was the loaned for one year to FC Wels in the Regionalliga Mitte.

In 2007 he signed a contract with the newly founded club SK Austria Kärnten. Bukva was also a cooperation player for FC Kärnten until it was dissolved in 2009. On 1 June 2009, he moved to SK Sturm Graz until the end of the 2013 season. During the 2010/11 winter break, Bukva joined LASK Linz on loan until the end of the season.

From 2014 to 2015 he played for German 3. Liga club FC Rot Weiß Erfurt. During the summer break of 2015, Bukva moved to SV Austria Salzburg. In mid-January 2016, he terminated his contract with the Salzburgers. On 4 February 2016, BV Cloppenburg, at that time playing in the Regionalliga Nord, announced the commitment of the winger. Bukvas left just a few hours after signing the contract, preferring to return to his Austrian homeland. His long-time advisor Thomas Dorawa, blamed those responsible for the club in Cloppenburg for the rapid departure of Bukva, who was the bearer of hope for the club in danger of relegation. After another four months without a club, Bukva joined the Austrian third division club ATSV Stadl-Paura at the beginning of July 2016.

He then played his first competitive game on 16 July 2016, when he was on the pitch for the full length of the game when his team lost 1–0 in the first round match of the ÖFB Cup 2016/17 against FC Blau-Weiß Linz. Under head coach Mayrleb, Bukva was used in 14 of the 16 possible league games until the winter break. He missed one game due to a yellow-red suspension and another due to a yellow-card suspension. He was mostly used in central midfield, but also played games in the central defense; in his 14 league appearances, he remained goalless and contributed a single assist. During the winter break, Bukva joined WSC Hertha Wels.

=== International career ===
The winger took part in the 2007 UEFA European Under-19 Championship in Austria and was eliminated with the team in the preliminary round.

Bukva played nine games for the Austrian U-21 national team during 2008–2009.

=== Coaching career ===
In December 2017 he began working as a player-coach at Union Peuerbach. At the beginning of May 2018, Union Peuerbach announced that it would be parting with him because, from their point of view, he had acted too little as a player-coach.

In July 2018, Union Schlierbach announced that they had hired Bukva as their new head coach.
