= 2024–25 Fortuna Sittard season =

Fortuna Sittard
2024–25 season
- Manager: Danny Buijs
- Stadium: Fortuna Sittard Stadion
- Eredivisie: 8th
- KNVB Cup: Second round
- Top goalscorer: League: Kristoffer Peterson (5); All: Kristoffer Peterson (5)
- Average home league attendance: 10,551

The 2024–25 season is the 57th season in the history of Fortuna Sittard and the eighth consecutive season in the Dutch Eredivisie. In addition to the domestic league, the club is competing in the KNVB Cup.

== Transfers ==
=== In ===
Pos.	Player	Transferred from	Fee	Date	Source
GK	(Netherlands) Mattijs Branderhorst	(Netherlands) FC Utrecht	Loan	24 July 2024	
MF	(Democratic Republic of the Congo) Samuel Bastien	(England) Burnley	Undisclosed	8 August 2024	
MF	(Argentina) Ezequiel Bullaude	(Netherlands) Feyenoord	Loan	2 September 2024	
MF	(France) Edouard Michut	Unattached	Free	5 November 2024	

=== Out ===
Pos.	Player	Transferred to	Fee	Date	Source
FW	(Croatia) Ante Erceg	(Croatia) Gorica	Undisclosed	2 January 2025	

== Pre-season and friendlies ==
12 July 2024 Friendly	Fortuna Sittard (Netherlands)	1–0	(Germany) SV Elversberg

16 July 2024 Friendly	Fortuna Sittard (Netherlands)	v	(Netherlands) FC Dordrecht

20 July 2024 Friendly	VfB Stuttgart (Germany)	3–0	(Netherlands) Fortuna Sittard

25 July 2024 Friendly	Fortuna Sittard (Netherlands)	1–3	(Germany) Borussia Mönchengladbach

1 August 2024 Friendly	RKVV EVV (Netherlands)	0–4	(Netherlands) Fortuna Sittard

2 August 2024 Friendly	Fortuna Sittard (Netherlands)	2–3	(Netherlands) De Graafschap

23 August 2024 Friendly	Genk (Belgium)	2–0	(Netherlands) Fortuna Sittard

4 September 2024 Friendly	Fortuna Sittard (Netherlands)	2–0	(Netherlands) TOP Oss

13 November 2024 Friendly	Fortuna Sittard (Netherlands)	3–0	(Netherlands) TOP Oss

== Competitions ==
=== Overall record ===
Competition	First match	Last match	Starting round	Final position	Record							
Competition	First match	Last match	Starting round	Final position	Pld	W	D	L	GF	GA	GD	Win %
Eredivisie	11 August 2024	18 May 2025	Matchday 1		17	7	4	6	25	25	+0	41.18
KNVB Cup	29 October 2024	17 December 2024	First round	Second round	2	1	0	1	5	4	+1	50.00
Total					19	8	4	7	30	29	+1	42.11

Last updated: 22 December 2024
Source: Competitions

=== Eredivisie ===
==== League table ====
Pos	Team	Pld	W	D	L	GF	GA	GD	Pts	Qualification or relegation
9	Heerenveen	34	12	7	15	42	57	−15	43	Qualification for the European competition play-offs
10	PEC Zwolle	34	10	11	13	43	51	−8	41	
11	Fortuna Sittard	34	11	8	15	37	54	−17	41	
12	Sparta Rotterdam	34	9	12	13	39	43	−4	39	
13	Groningen	34	10	9	15	40	53	−13	39	

Source: Eredivisie
Rules for classification: 1) Points; 2) Goal difference; 3) Goals scored; 4) Head-to-head points; 5) Head-to-head goal difference; 6) Head-to-head away goals scored; 7) Play-off if relevant for deciding champion, relegation or participating in a European league, otherwise by draw. 8) Penalty shoot-out (only after a play-off)

==== Results summary ====
Overall								Home						Away					
Pld	W	D	L	GF	GA	GD	Pts	W	D	L	GF	GA	GD	W	D	L	GF	GA	GD
17	7	4	6	25	25	0	25	5	0	3	13	10	+3	2	4	3	12	15	−3

Last updated: 14 December 2024.

==== Results by round ====
Round	1	2	3	4	5	6	7	8	9	10	11	12	13	14	15	16	17
Ground	A	H	A	H	A	H	A	H	A	H	H	A	H	A	A	H	A
Result	W	W	L	L	L	L	D	W	D	W	W	L	L	D	D	W	W
Position																	

Updated to match(es) played on 22 December 2024. Source:
A = Away; H = Home; W = Win; D = Draw; L = Loss

==== Matches ====
The league schedule was released on 24 June 2024.

11 August 2024 1	Go Ahead Eagles	0–2	Fortuna Sittard	Deventer
				Stadium: De Adelaarshorst

16 August 2024 2	Fortuna Sittard	3–0	Almere City	Sittard
				Stadium: Fortuna Sittard Stadion

31 August 2024 4	Fortuna Sittard	0–3	NEC	Sittard
				Stadium: Fortuna Sittard Stadion

14 September 2024 5	NAC Breda	1–0	Fortuna Sittard	Breda

18 September 2024 3	Ajax	5–0	Fortuna Sittard	Amsterdam

22 September 2024 6	Fortuna Sittard	1–3	PSV	Sittard
				Stadium: Fortuna Sittard Stadion

28 September 2024 7	Sparta Rotterdam	1–1	Fortuna Sittard	Rotterdam

6 October 2024 8	Fortuna Sittard	1–0	AZ	Sittard
				Stadium: Fortuna Sittard Stadion

20 October 2024 9	Willem II	0–0	Fortuna Sittard	Tilburg

26 October 2024 10	Fortuna Sittard	1–0	FC Groningen	Sittard
				Stadium: Fortuna Sittard Stadion

2 November 2024 11	Fortuna Sittard	3–0	sc Heerenveen	Sittard
				Stadium: Fortuna Sittard Stadion

9 November 2024 12	PEC Zwolle	3–1	Fortuna Sittard	Zwolle

23 November 2024 13	Fortuna Sittard	1–2	Twente	Sittard
				Stadium: Fortuna Sittard Stadion

30 November 2024 14	Feyenoord	1–1	Fortuna Sittard	Rotterdam
				Stadium: De Kuip

7 December 2024 15	Heracles Almelo	2–2	Fortuna Sittard	Almelo

14 December 2024 16	Fortuna Sittard	3–2	RKC Waalwijk	Sittard
20:00				Stadium: Fortuna Sittard Stadion

22 December 2024 17	FC Utrecht	2–5	Fortuna Sittard	Utrecht
14:30				Stadium: Stadion Galgenwaard

=== KNVB Cup ===
29 October 2024 First round	De Treffers	1–4	Fortuna Sittard	Groesbeek
21:00	Waterink 47'	Report	Kornelis 58' (o.g.); Da Cruz 59'; Bullaude 79', 89' (pen.)	Stadium: Sportpark Zuid veld 1 Referee: Kevin Puts

17 December 2024 Second round	Quick Boys	3–1	Fortuna Sittard	Katwijk
20:00		Report		Stadium: Sportpark Nieuw Zuid; Referee: Bas Nijhuis
