= Fabjan Tomić =

Croatian footballer

Personal information
- Date of birth: 15 June 1995 (age 31)
- Place of birth: Split, Croatia
- Height: 1.89 m (6 ft 2 1/2 in)
- Position: Goalkeeper

Youth career
- 2001–2002: NK Zagreb
- 2002–2006: Debreceni VSC
- 2007: MTK Budapest FC
- 2008–2014: Hajduk Split

Senior career*
Years	Team	Apps	(Gls)
2014–2016	Hajduk Split	7	(0)
2014	→ Hajduk Split B	4	(0)
2015	→ Vitez (loan)	2	(0)
2015	→ Hrvatski Dragovoljac (loan)	3	(0)
2016	→ Rudeš (loan)	0	(0)
2016–2017	Vrapče	0	(0)
2017	Junak Sinj	5	(0)
2018	Hrvatski Dragovoljac	0	(0)
2019	Špansko	1	(0)

International career
2012	Croatia U19	1	(0)
- * Club domestic league appearances and goals as of 23:46, 28 May 2019 (UTC)

Fabjan Tomić (born 15 June 1995) is a retired Croatian football goalkeeper, last playing for NK Špansko.

== Career ==
His father Sandro Tomić was also goalkeeper of Hajduk Split and his currently goalkeeping coach in Turkmenistan national football team. He started training football at the age of 6 at NK Zagreb, where his father had played. He followed his father to Hungary the following year and joined the Debreceni VSC academy and, when his father moved to Budapest, MTK Budapest FC, becoming fluent in Hungarian. After that, he moved back to his hometown, joining the HNK Hajduk Split academy.

He was promoted to the first team of Hajduk in January 2014 and after injuries to Hajduk's first and second choice keepers he stepped in and made seven appearances in his first season in the top flight of Croatian football, keeping one clean sheet.

In September 2016, Tomić joined NK Vrapče. He played there until February 2017, where he joined NK Junak Sinj. One year later he signed with NK Hrvatski Dragovoljac. In February 2019, he joined NK Špansko.
