= Marin Con =

Croatian footballer

Personal information
- Date of birth: 8 February 1985 (age 41)
- Place of birth: Rijeka, Croatia
- Height: 1.87 m (6 ft 2 in)
- Position: Centre-back

Team information
- Current team: Krk
- Number: 5

Youth career
- –2004: HNK Rijeka

Senior career*
Years	Team	Apps	(Gls)
2004–2008	Rijeka	0	(0)
2004–2006	→ Novalja (loan)	40	(3)
2006–2007	→ Orijent (loan)	28	(1)
2007–2008	→ Pomorac (loan)	28	(5)
2008–2009	Flamurtari	30	(1)
2009–2010	Pomorac	25	(5)
2010–2014	Zadar	80	(3)
2014–2015	Al-Fahaheel	17	(3)
2015–2016	Krk	13	(1)
2016	Sohar		
2016–	Krk	34	(4)
- * Club domestic league appearances and goals as of 11 October 2017

Marin Con (born 8 February 1985) is a Croatian footballer who plays as a centre-back for NK Krk in the Croatian Third Football League.
