= Ivan Anton Vasilj =

Croatian football player (born 1991)

Personal information
- Date of birth: 5 April 1991 (age 35)
- Place of birth: Zadar Croatia
- Height: 1.84 m (6 ft 1/2 in)
- Positions: Left back; left winger

Team information
- Current team: Zadar

Youth career
- Zadar

Senior career*
Years	Team	Apps	(Gls)
2010–2013	Zadar	90	(0)
2014–2015	Hajduk Split	7	(0)
2014	→ Slaven Belupo (loan)	0	(0)
2015	→ Hajduk Split	4	(1)
2015–2016	Zadar		
2016–2017	RNK Split	15	(0)
2017–2018	Dinamo Zagreb II		
2018–2019	Brežice	10	(1)
2019–	Zadar		
- * Club domestic league appearances and goals as of 19 May 2018

Ivan Anton Vasilj (born 5 April 1991) is a Croatian football player who plays for Zadar.

== Club career ==
Vasilj passed through all the ranks of the NK Zadar academy. A captain of their U-19 team at the time, he made his professional debut in the Prva HNL at 6 March 2010 against NK Karlovac.

A left-footed left back/winger, he went on to establish himself in the NK Zadar first team, featuring regularly in the second part of the 2010–11 season onwards. In December 2012, the doping test after a match revealed the presence of the illegal cannabinoid JWH-018 in his body. It was, however, ascertained, that it wasn't taken directly and willingly, possibly inhaled unwittingly somewhere in form of incense or air freshener, and therefore not punished harshly and he only ended up missing one match because of it. He would go on to feature regularly for the rest of the season.

In January 2014 he terminated his contract with NK Zadar. In February, he joined Hajduk Split on a free transfer. He's a left back.

== Personal life ==
Though born and raised in Zadar, his family originally came from Međugorje
