= Goran Jozinović =

Croatian footballer

Personal information
- Date of birth: 27 August 1990 (age 36)
- Place of birth: Zenica, SFR Yugoslavia
- Height: 1.78 m (5 ft 10 in)
- Position: Left back

Team information
- Current team: GOŠK Kaštel Gomilica

Youth career
- 1996–2008: Hajduk Split

Senior career*
Years	Team	Apps	(Gls)
2007–2015	Hajduk Split	117	(2)
2009	→ Zadar (loan)	27	(1)
2014	→ Hajduk Split B	1	(0)
2015–2018	Lugano	40	(0)
2018–2019	Schaffhausen	8	(0)
2019–2021	Koper	26	(2)
2021-	GOŠK Kaštel Gomilica		

International career
2006	Croatia U16	9	(1)
2006	Croatia U17	10	(0)
2008	Croatia U19	7	(0)
2009	Croatia U20	4	(0)
2008–2011	Croatia U21	14	(0)
- * Club domestic league appearances and goals as of 14:28, 15 April 2020 (UTC)

Goran Jozinović (born 27 August 1990) is a Croatian football player who was born in Bosnia and Herzegovina who plays for GOŠK Kaštel Gomilica since July 2021.

== Club career ==
=== Hajduk Split ===
Jozinović made his Hajduk debut on 29 September 2007, just 17 years of age in a Prva HNL match against Šibenik. He made 10 further appearances in the 07/08 season, showing much potential. The following season, Goran struggling for playing time, making just two appearances in the first half of the season and so went out on loan to NK Zadar for the remainder of the season. He spent the first six months of the 09/10 season at Zadar, too, a regular starter at left back in the year he spent in total with the club. Upon his return to Hajduk in January 2010, his stature at the club improved following his successful loan spell and he achieved more playing time. In this season he was also a regular for the Croatian under 21 side. He made 26 appearances for Hajduk in the 2010/11 season, his first full season for the club as an established first team member. An injury in the following off season meant that devastatingly Jozinovic missed almost the entire 11/12 season, returning in round 25 and making just three appearances that season. After recovering from his injury and having a full pre-season under his belt, Jozinovic went into the 12/13 season with big ambitions and had a good season, making 25 appearances, scoring a goal against rivals Dinamo Zagreb and even captained the side on two occasions. He was given the Heart of Hajduk Award at the end of this season, a sign of his strong contribution in that campaign. The next season, Goran made 35 appearances for Hajduk, including his 100th in total for Hajduk. In the 2014/2015 season he found himself being used less and less by the club, and was given free hands to look for a new club at mid-season. However, he remained at the club and was reinstated in the first team by the newly reappointed manager Stanko Poklepović. His contract wasn't renewed, however, and he played his last game for Hajduk against RNK Split on 29 May 2015, leaving his beloved club on good terms, admitting he had his ups and downs, but stating he had always given his maximum.

== National Side ==
Jozinović was capped for the Croatia national team at several youth levels since 2006.

== Career statistics ==
Club	Season	League		Cup		Europe		Total	
Club	Season	Apps	Goals	Apps	Goals	Apps	Goals	Apps	Goals
Hajduk Split	2007–08	11	0	4	0	–		15	0
Hajduk Split	2008–09	2	0	1	0	–		3	0
Zadar (loan)	2008–09	14	0	–		–		14	0
Zadar (loan)	2009–10	13	1	–		–		13	1
Hajduk Split	2009–10	5	1	–		–		5	1
Hajduk Split	2010–11	22	0	1	0	4	0	27	0
Hajduk Split	2011–12	3	0	–		–		3	0
Hajduk Split	2012–13	20	1	5	0	3	0	28	1
Hajduk Split	2013–14	11	0	0	0	3	0	14	0
Total		91	3	11	0	7	0	109	3
Last Update: 13 July 2013

Awards
Preceded by Youth academy	Heart of Hajduk Award; 2013	Succeeded by Mario Pašalić
