= Mislav Anđelković =

Croatian footballer

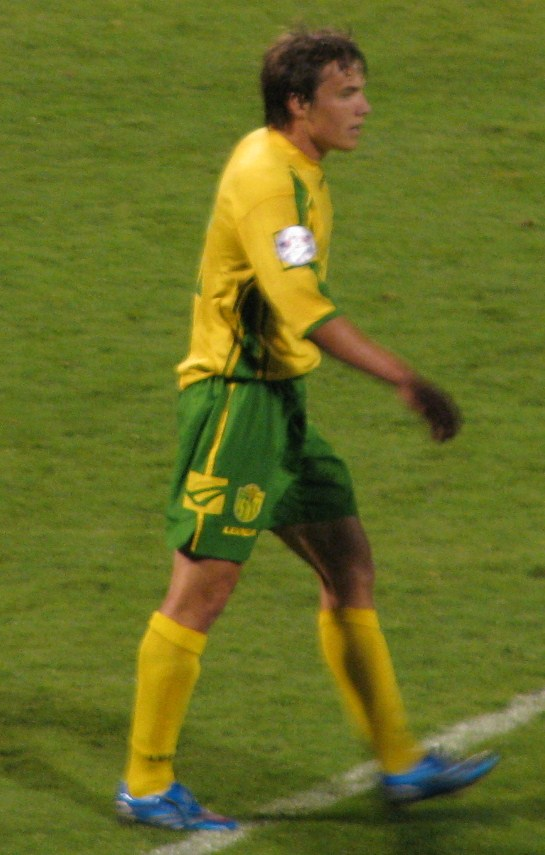

Personal information
- Full name: Mislav Anđelković
- Date of birth: 22 April 1988 (age 38)
- Place of birth: Dubrovnik, SFR Yugoslavia
- Height: 1.74 m (5 ft 8 1/2 in)
- Position: Defensive midfielder

Team information
- Current team: Chions

Youth career
- –2005: Dubrovnik 1919
- 2005–2007: Istra 1961

Senior career*
Years	Team	Apps	(Gls)
2006–2013	Istra 1961	155	(6)
2013–2015	Hajduk Split	30	(0)
2015	Koper	5	(0)
2016–2019	Birkirkara	87	(3)
2019–2020	Rudar Velenje	11	(0)
2021–	Chions		
- * Club domestic league appearances and goals as of 19:25, 21 November 2019 (UTC)

Mislav Anđelković (born 22 April 1988) is a Croatian football midfielder who plays for Italian lower league side Chions.

== Club career ==
Anđelković, a native of Mokošica, started his career in the youth ranks of HNK Dubrovnik 1919. At 17 years of age, he was supposed to move to the HNK Hajduk Split youth team, but wishing to continue his education in a gymnasium, instead of the high school of economy that was offered to him by the club, he chose to move to Pula and join NK Istra 1961, then named NK Pula Staro Češko, instead.

He made his first team debut the following season, on 8 November 2006, coming in for Ivan Babić in the 75th minute of the match against Dinamo Zagreb. His club was relegated after that season, and Anđelković found himself one of the key players for his team, and he helped them achieve promotion again after only 2 seasons in the second tier.

Anđelković remained with the club for four more seasons, as the team captain, until the expiry of his contract in June 2013, amassing when he signed a contract with the club he has rooted for since childhood, HNK Hajduk Split.

=== Hajduk Split ===
Anđelković made 25 appearances in his first season at the club, playing mostly as a holder in midfield, acting as one of the experienced leaders of the young side despite his own young age.

He left Hajduk in January 2015.
