= Ivan Tomičić =

Croatian footballer

Personal information
- Date of birth: 1 March 1993 (age 33)
- Place of birth: Split, Croatia
- Height: 1.84 m (6 ft 1/2 in)
- Position: Midfielder

Youth career
- 2001–2006: Kamen Ivanbegovina
- 2007–2012: Hajduk Split

Senior career*
| Years | Team | Apps | (Gls) |
| 2012–2015 | Hajduk Split | 4 | (1) |
| 2012 | → Primorac 1929 (loan) | 14 | (0) |
| 2013 | → Solin (loan) | 8 | (0) |
| 2013 | → Segesta (loan) | 11 | (4) |
| 2014 | → Mantova (loan) | 10 | (1) |
| 2015 | → Ischia Isolaverde (loan) | 2 | (0) |
| 2015 | → Hajduk Split B | 9 | (0) |
| 2016 | Imotski | 31 | (10) |
| 2017 | RNK Split | 12 | (2) |
| 2017 | Inter Zaprešić | 5 | (0) |
| 2018 | Rudeš | 9 | (1) |
| 2019 | Lučko | 10 | (0) |
| 2019–2022 | RNK Split | 52 | (11) |

International career
| 2007 | Croatia U14 | 1 | (0) |
| 2008 | Croatia U15 | 2 | (2) |
| 2008–2009 | Croatia U16 | 12 | (1) |
| 2009–2010 | Croatia U17 | 6 | (0) |
| 2011 | Croatia U19 | 1 | (0) |

Managerial career
- 2022: RNK Split
- * Club domestic league appearances and goals as of 12:44, 4 June 2019 (UTC)

Ivan Tomičić (born 1 March 1993 in Split) is a Croatian retired football midfielder who was most recently manager of RNK Split.

== Club career ==
Ivan Tomičić joined Hajduk Split's youth academy in 2007 from the lower-tier side Kamen Ivanbegovina. A youth international, he joined the Hajduk senior team in 2012, and was sent to the club's feeder team NK Primorac 1929 in the summer of 2012. In the summer of 2013 Ivan went on loan in HNK Segesta, returning to Hajduk for the second part of the season. Tomičić spent the 2014/15 season on loans in Italy, at Serie C sides Mantova F.C. and Ischia before returning to Croatia. Following another period at Hajduk's reserve team, Tomičić was released from his contract and joined second-tier NK Imotski. After a year at the club, Tomičić returned to the top tier of Croatian football, signing for RNK Split. Following the club's relegation, Tomičić joined Inter Zaprešić, but left the club at the winter break. Following some trials abroad, Tomičić another Prva HNL team, NK Rudeš, in the summer of 2018, on a year-long contract.

== Managerial career ==
Tomičić replaced Ivan Radeljić as manager of RNK Split in March 2022, only to be relieved of his duties himself in September that same year.
