= Lee Addy =

Ghanaian footballer (born 1985)

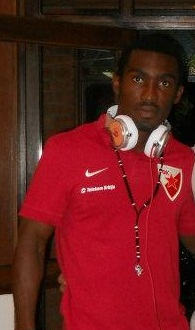
- Addy with Red Star Belgrade in 2011

Personal information
- Date of birth: 26 September 1985 (age 41)
- Place of birth: Accra, Greater Accra, Ghana
- Height: 1.79 m (5 ft 10 in)
- Position: Defender

Senior career*
Years	Team	Apps	(Gls)
2007–2008	Nania	20	(0)
2008–2010	Bechem Chelsea	46	(2)
2010–2011	Red Star Belgrade	32	(0)
2012–2014	Dalian Aerbin	24	(0)
2013–2014	→ Dinamo Zagreb (loan)	16	(0)
2014–2015	Dinamo Zagreb	8	(0)
2015	→ Lokomotiva Zagreb (loan)	4	(0)
2015–2016	Čukarički	8	(0)
2017	Lusaka Dynamos		
2019	Free State Stars	0	(0)

International career
2009–2012	Ghana	30	(0)
- * Club domestic league appearances and goals

Lee Addy (born 26 September 1985) is a Ghanaian former professional footballer who played as a defender. He played for the Ghana national team at the 2010 FIFA World Cup.

== Club career ==
=== Early career ===
Addy began his senior career in 2007 playing with Nania F.C. Soon after, in 2008, he moved to the Bechem Chelsea playing in the Ghana Premier League.

=== Red Star Belgrade ===
At the end of the 2010 FIFA World Cup Addy received a call to move to Europe to play with Serbian SuperLiga club Red Star Belgrade and he signed a contract. He became a regular centre-back at both his club and the Ghana national team.

=== Dalian Aerbin ===
On 4 January 2012, Addy completed a three-year deal with newly promoted Chinese Super League side Dalian Aerbin and was handed the squad number 13 after passing a medical test. The move from Serbian club Red Star Belgrade was for a reported transfer fee of $2.2 million.

=== Dinamo Zagreb ===
On 10 February 2013, it was announced that Addy had been loaned to Dinamo Zagreb for a year. He signed for Dinamo Zagreb in January 2014. He ended his Dinamo Zagreb spell in late July 2015.

=== Čukarički ===
Addy signed a one-year contract with FK Čukarički on 31 August 2015.

=== Free State Stars ===
In August 2019 it was reported, that Addy had signed with Free State Stars in South Africa. However, it was later reported in December 2019, that he had terminated his contract with the club.

== International career ==
=== Early career & 2010 African Nations Cup ===
On 30 September 2009, Addy made his debut for the Ghana national team as part of a domestic-based team that played a friendly against Argentina. He was part of the Ghana national squad at the 2010 Africa Cup of Nations having played four matches including the lost final against Egypt. and since then he quickly became a regular player of the national team.

=== 2010 World Cup ===
Addy was called up by Ghana's national team for the 2010 FIFA World Cup In Ghana's opening game at the 2010 World Cup, he entered as a substitute in a 1–0 win over Serbia. He also played in the 1–1 draw against Australia in the group stage, after which he appeared again as a substitute in the Round of 16 2–1 victory over the United States, but couldn't play in the quarter-finals match against Uruguay because of accumulated yellow cards, where Ghana was eliminated in a penalty shoot-out.

== Age controversy ==
Before the 2010 FIFA World Cup, Addy's age became the subject of controversy. When he debuted in the national team in September 2009, he was registered with date of birth 26 September 1985. That statement also stated on most sites on the web. Even FIFA lists Addy as born on 26 September 1985 in the official documents. But when Addy was reported in Ghana's World Cup squad, he had suddenly been five years younger and lists as born on 7 July 1990. The Swedish newspaper Aftonbladet was in contact with FIFA regarding the matter. FIFA informed that they did a passport control on Addy, but they did not find anything suspicious. Also there was a lack of comparative material, because Addy never got any previous passport control.

== Honours ==
Red Star Belgrade

- Serbian Cup: 2011–12

Dinamo Zagreb

- Croatian First League: 2012–13, 2013–14
- Croatian Super Cup: 2013

Ghana

- African Nations Cup runner-up: 2010

Individual

- Ghana Premier League: Best central defender of the 2008 season
