= Tonći Mujan =

Croatian footballer

Personal information
- Date of birth: 19 July 1995 (age 31)
- Place of birth: Šibenik, Croatia
- Height: 1.77 m (5 ft 10 in)
- Position: Winger

Team information
- Current team: Posušje
- Number: 7

Youth career
- 2006–2013: Hajduk Split

Senior career*
| Years | Team | Apps | (Gls) |
| 2013–2017 | Hajduk Split | 21 | (0) |
| 2014–2016 | Hajduk Split II | 27 | (10) |
| 2014 | → Deportivo B (loan) | 6 | (5) |
| 2015 | → Zadar (loan) | 4 | (0) |
| 2017–2018 | Krško | 44 | (6) |
| 2018–2021 | Domžale | 60 | (6) |
| 2020 | → Ümraniyespor (loan) | 6 | (0) |
| 2021 | → Aluminij (loan) | 11 | (2) |
| 2021–2022 | Široki Brijeg | 23 | (9) |
| 2022 | Hanoi | 16 | (2) |
| 2023–2024 | Budućnost Podgorica | 24 | (4) |
| 2024 | Velež Mostar | 6 | (0) |
| 2025– | Posušje | 8 | (0) |

International career
| 2009 | Croatia U14 | 2 | (1) |
| 2010 | Croatia U15 | 4 | (0) |
| 2010 | Croatia U16 | 2 | (0) |
| 2011 | Croatia U17 | 9 | (3) |
| 2013 | Croatia U19 | 6 | (2) |
- * Club domestic league appearances and goals as of 1 June 2025

Tonći Mujan (born 19 July 1995) is a Croatian professional footballer who plays as a winger for the Premier League club Posušje.

== Club career ==
An offense-oriented winger or a forward, operating mostly on the left side of the attack, Mujan passed through the ranks of Hajduk Split's youth academy. A youth international, he made his first-team debut aged 17, on 4 May 2013, in an away loss against RNK Split, coming in for Ivan Vuković in the 66th minute of the game. On 31 January 2014, he joined Deportivo de La Coruña B on loan.

On 6 February 2017, he joined Slovenian side Krško.

After spells in Slovenian PrvaLiga, Süper Lig, V.League 1, and Montenegrin First League, Mujan returned to the Premier League to sign for Velež Mostar on June 4th 2024.

== Honours ==
Hanoi

- V.League 1: 2022
- Vietnamese Cup: 2022
