= 2011–12 HNK Hajduk Split season =

Hajduk Split
2011–12 season
- Chairman: Hrvoje Maleš
- Manager: Krasimir Balakov (until 22 March 2012); Mišo Krstičević (from 22 March 2012)
- Prva HNL: 2nd
- Croatian Cup: Quarter-finals
- Europa League: Third qualifying round
- Top goalscorer: League: Ante Vukušić (12); All: Ante Vukušić (15)
- Highest home attendance: 35,000 vs Stoke City (4 August 2011)
- Lowest home attendance: 2,000 (Three matches)
- Average home league attendance: 10,067
Home colours	Away colours

The 2011–12 season was the 101st season in Hajduk Split’s history and their twenty-first in the Croatian First Football League (Prva HNL). Their 2nd place finish in the 2010–11 season means it was their 21st successive season playing in the Prva HNL.

== First-team squad ==
As of 17 April 2012

Note: Flags indicate national team as defined under FIFA eligibility rules; some limited exceptions apply. Players may hold more than one non-FIFA nationality.

No.	Pos.	Nation	Player
1	GK	CRO	Goran Blažević
2	MF	CRO	Josip Radošević
3	MF	CRO	Frane Vladislavić
4	DF	CRO	Antonio Milić
5	DF	CRO	Goran Milović
6	DF	CRO	Špiro Peričić
7	MF	CRO	Filip Ozobić (on loan from Spartak Moscow)
9	FW	CRO	Ahmad Sharbini
11	MF	CRO	Srđan Andrić (captain)
12	GK	CRO	Ivan Banić
13	FW	CRO	Ante Vukušić
14	MF	CRO	Marin Tomasov
15	FW	CRO	Ivan Lendrić
16	MF	CRO	Ivo-Valentino Tomaš
17	DF	CRO	Tonći Kukoč
18	MF	CRO	Mijo Caktaš

No.	Pos.	Nation	Player
20	DF	CRO	Goran Jozinović
21	MF	CRO	Jure Obšivač
22	DF	CRO	Mario Maloča
23	DF	CRO	Mato Neretljak
24	FW	MNE	Ivan Vuković
25	GK	CRO	Dante Stipica
26	FW	CRO	Mario Jelavić
27	MF	CRO	Franko Andrijašević
28	DF	POR	Ruben Lima
29	DF	CRO	Marko Barišić
30	FW	CRO	Tomislav Kiš
33	DF	BRA	James Dens
77	MF	CRO	Drago Gabrić
90	FW	CRO	Ivan Jakov Džoni
99	MF	CRO	Anas Sharbini

== Competitions ==
=== Overall record ===
Performance by competition
Competition	Starting round	Final position/round	First match	Last match
Prva HNL	—N/a	Runners-up	19 July 2011	12 May 2012
Croatian Football Cup	First round	Quarter-final	15 September 2011	30 November 2011
UEFA Europa League	Third qualifying round		28 July 2011	4 August 2011

Statistics by competition
Competition	Pld	W	D	L	GF	GA	GD	Win%
Prva HNL	30	16	6	8	50	24	+26	53.33
Croatian Football Cup	4	3	0	1	9	4	+5	75.00
UEFA Europa League	2	0	0	2	0	2	−2	0.00
Total	36	19	6	11	59	30	+29	52.78

=== Prva HNL ===
==== Classification ====
Pos	Team	Pld	W	D	L	GF	GA	GD	Pts	Qualification or relegation
1	Dinamo Zagreb (C)	30	23	6	1	73	11	+62	75	Qualification to Champions League second qualifying round
2	Hajduk Split	30	16	6	8	50	24	+26	54	Qualification to Europa League second qualifying round (Note: Since 2011–12 Croatian Cup winners Dinamo Zagreb qualified for the 2012–13 UEFA Champions League, so cup runners-up Osijek qualified for the 2012–13 UEFA Europa League first qualifying round. Moreover, Slaven Belupo were moved up a round as the cup winner spot was not used.)
3	Slaven Belupo	30	14	10	6	41	27	+14	52	Qualification to Europa League second qualifying round
4	RNK Split	30	14	8	8	43	32	+11	50	
5	Cibalia	30	13	6	11	35	35	0	45	

Source: Sportnet.hr
Rules for classification: 1) points; 2) goal difference; 3) number of goals scored.
For deciding champions, qualification to UEFA Europa League and relegation: 1st points; 2nd head-to-head points; 3rd head-to-head goal difference; 4th head-to-head away goals scored
(C) Champions

==== Results summary ====
Overall								Home						Away					
Pld	W	D	L	GF	GA	GD	Pts	W	D	L	GF	GA	GD	W	D	L	GF	GA	GD
30	16	6	8	50	24	+26	54	9	3	3	25	11	+14	7	3	5	25	13	+12

Last updated: 12 May 2012.
Source: Sportnet.hr

==== Results by round ====
Round	1	2	3	4	5	6	7	8	9	10	11	12	13	14	15	16	17	18	19	20	21	22	23	24	25	26	27	28	29	30
Ground	H	A	H	A	H	A	H	A	H	A	H	A	H	H	A	A	H	A	H	A	H	A	H	A	H	A	H	A	A	H
Result	W	L	W	W	W	D	D	W	W	D	W	W	L	W	L	W	W	W	D	W	D	L	W	D	W	L	L	L	W	L
Position	4	8	5	3	2	2	2	2	2	2	2	2	2	2	2	2	2	2	2	2	2	2	2	2	2	2	2	2	2	2

Source: Competitive matches
A = Away; H = Home; W = Win; D = Draw; L = Loss
Notes: Round 18 was played between rounds 22 and 23, on 20–21 March 2012

==== Results by opponent ====
Team	Results		Points
Team	1	2	Points
Cibalia	2–0	1–0	6
Dinamo Zagreb	1–1	1–2	1
Inter Zaprešić	1–2	0–1	0
Istra 1961	3–0	1–1	4
Karlovac	1–1	1–0	4
Lokomotiva	0–1	0–1	0
Lučko	3–0	1–2	3
Osijek	3–1	1–2	3
Rijeka	2–1	3–0	6
Šibenik	2–1	2–1	6
Slaven Belupo	4–1	1–1	4
RNK Split	1–1	0–0	2
Varaždin	3–0	3–0	6
Zadar	0–1	1–0	3
NK Zagreb	4–0	4–2	6

Source: 2011–12 Croatian First Football League article

== Matches ==
=== Friendlies ===
==== Pre-season ====
Match	Date	Venue	Opponent	Score	Attendance	Hajduk Scorers	Report
1	22 Jun	A (Bosnia and Herzegovina)	Tomislav (Bosnia and Herzegovina)	6 – 0	2,500	Vukušić, Lendrić (4), Vuković	Sportnet.hr
2	24 Jun	N (Bosnia and Herzegovina)	Sloga Uskoplje (Bosnia and Herzegovina)	2 – 1	2,000	Vukušić, Luštica	Sportnet.hr
3	26 Jun	A (Bosnia and Herzegovina)	Troglav (Bosnia and Herzegovina)	2 – 3	2,000	Ah. Sharbini, Pešić	Sportnet.hr
4	28 Jun	N (Bosnia and Herzegovina)	Branitelj (Bosnia and Herzegovina)	2 – 1	1,500	Andrijašević, Trebotić	Sportnet.hr
5	6 Jul	N (Austria)	Villacher (Austria)	5 – 1	–	Džoni, Lendrić, Jelavić (3)	hajduk.hr
6	7 Jul	N (Austria)	Feldkirchen (Austria)	6 – 1	–	An. Sharbini, Vukušić, Tomasov, Ah. Sharbini (2), Vejić	hajduk.hr
7	11 Jul	N (Austria)	Feldkirchen (Austria)	8 – 1	–	Lendrić, Džoni (3), Jelavić (3), Trebotić	hajduk.hr
8	12 Jul	N (Austria)	Bursaspor (Turkey)	1 – 0	100	Ah. Sharbini	Sportnet.hr
9	23 Jul	H	Barcelona (Spain)	0 – 0	30,000		Sportnet.hr

==== On-season ====
Match	Date	Venue	Opponent	Score	Attendance	Hajduk Scorers	Report
1	4 Sep	A (Bosnia and Herzegovina)	GOŠK Gabela (Bosnia and Herzegovina)	1 – 1	2,000	Ah. Sharbini	hajduk.hr
2	15 Apr	A (Bosnia and Herzegovina)	Napredak Matići (Bosnia and Herzegovina)	8 – 0	2,000	Lendrić (4), Pešić, Andrijašević, Vukušić, Kukoč	hajduk.hr
3	28 Apr	A	Papuk Orahovica	10 – 1	800	Ah. Sharbini (2), Vuković, Tomičić, Gabrić (2), Caktaš, Vukušić (3)	hajduk.hr
4	5 May	A	Neretvanac	5 – 1	1,500	Gabrić, Caktaš, Džoni (2), Tomičić	hajduk.hr
5	13 May	A	Urania Baška Voda	2 – 0	600	Gabrić, Jovanović	hajduk.hr

==== Mid-season ====
Match	Date	Venue	Opponent	Score	Attendance	Hajduk Scorers	Report
1	16 Jan	H	Primorac 1929	2 – 1	1,500	Vuković, Lendrić	Sportnet.hr
2	18 Jan	H	Dugopolje	2 – 4	2,000	Vuković, Kiš	Sportnet.hr
3	20 Jan	H	Zadar	0 – 0	1,500		Sportnet.hr
4	22 Jan	H	Mosor	2 – 1	500	Tomaš, Kiš	Sportnet.hr
5	27 Jan	N (Turkey)	Austria Wien	0 – 3	50		Sportnet.hr
6	30 Jan	N (Turkey)	Kairat Almaty (Kazakhstan)	1 – 0	30	Andrić	Sportnet.hr
7	3 Feb	N (Turkey)	Vaslui (Romania)	0 – 0 (8 – 7 p)	50		Sportnet.hr
8	5 Feb	N (Turkey)	Lokomotiv Plovdiv (Bulgaria)	2 – 2 (6 – 5 p)	50	Vukušić (2)	Sportnet.hr

=== Prva HNL ===
19 July 2011 1	Hajduk Split	2–1	Šibenik	Split
20:00 CEST (UTC+02:00)	Vukušić 3'; Tomasov 86'; Ljubičić (yellow card) 87'	Report	Vuk 8' (yellow card) 52'	Stadium: Stadion Poljud; Attendance: 18,000; Referee: Zlatko Šimčić (Koprivnica)

31 July 2011 2	Zadar	1–0	Hajduk Split	Zadar
20:00 CEST (UTC+02:00)	Santini 51'; Vasilj (yellow card) 87'; Begonja (yellow card) 90'	Report	Rúben Lima (yellow card) 34'; Andrić (yellow card) 39'	Stadium: Stadion Stanovi; Attendance: 4,000; Referee: Igor Pristovnik (Zagreb)

7 August 2011 3	Hajduk Split	2–1	Rijeka	Split
20:00 CEST (UTC+02:00)	Vukušić 26'; Andrić 78' (yellow card) 89'; Ah. Sharbini (yellow card) 88'	Report	Križman (yellow card) 54'; Švrljuga 82'	Stadium: Stadion Poljud; Attendance: 10,000; Referee: Andrej Burilo (Osijek)

13 August 2011 4	Istra 1961	0–3	Hajduk Split	Pula
20:00 CEST (UTC+02:00)		Report	Tomasov 16'; Ah. Sharbini 59', 71'; Kukoč (yellow card) 69'	Stadium: Stadion Aldo Drosina; Attendance: 6,000; Referee: Domagoj Vučkov (Rijeka)

21 August 2011 5	Hajduk Split	4–0	NK Zagreb	Split
20:00 CEST (UTC+02:00)	Tomasov 1'; Ah. Sharbini 30', 52'; Brkljača (yellow card) 32'; Kukoč 59'	Report	Pelaić (red card) 34'; Jurendić (yellow card) 44'; Mitrović (yellow card) 79'	Stadium: Stadion Poljud; Attendance: 10,000; Referee: Damir Batinić (Osijek)

28 August 2011 6	RNK Split	1–1	Hajduk Split	Split
20:00 CEST (UTC+02:00)	Obilinović 4'; Šimić (yellow card) 17'; Vidić (yellow card) 19'; Križanac (yellow card) 24'; Pehar (yellow card) 90'	Report	Tomasov 2'	Stadium: Stadion Park Mladeži; Attendance: 4,200; Referee: Bruno Marić (Daruvar)

10 September 2011 7	Hajduk Split	1–1	Dinamo Zagreb	Split
20:00 CEST (UTC+02:00)	Brkljača (yellow card) 10' (yellow-red card) 20'; Andrić 44' (yellow card) 75'; An. Sharbini (yellow card) 52'; Maloča (yellow card) 75'	Report	Sammir (yellow card) 38'; Ibáñez 45+5'; Šimunić (yellow card) 89'	Stadium: Stadion Poljud; Attendance: 33,000; Referee: Ivan Bebek (Rijeka)

17 September 2011 8	Cibalia	0–2	Hajduk Split	Vinkovci
18:00 CEST (UTC+02:00)	Kvesić (yellow card) 80'; Grgić (yellow card) 87'; Bartolović (yellow card) 90+1'; Matković (yellow card) 90+2'; Tomić (yellow card) 90+3'	Report	Kukoč 24'; Rúben Lima (yellow card) 76'; An. Sharbini 90+3' (pen.)	Stadium: Stadion HNK Cibalia; Attendance: 6,000; Referee: Marijo Strahonja (Zagreb)

25 September 2011 9	Hajduk Split	4–1	Slaven Belupo	Split
20:00 CEST (UTC+02:00)	Tomasov 29'; Maloča (yellow card) 52'; Andrić (yellow card) 55'; An. Sharbini (yellow card) 62' (goal) 63'; Vukušić (penalty missed) 73' 88'; Lendrić 76'	Report	Glavica 9'; Grgić (yellow card) 17'; Pilipović (yellow card) 25' (red card) 72'	Stadium: Stadion Poljud; Attendance: 12,000; Referee: Ante Vučemilović-Šimunović (Osijek)

2 October 2011 10	Karlovac	1–1	Hajduk Split	Karlovac
18:00 CEST (UTC+02:00)	Špišić (yellow card) 32'; Stambolija 54'	Report	An. Sharbini 15'	Stadium: Stadion Branko Čavlović-Čavlek; Attendance: 4,000; Referee: Ivan Bebek (Rijeka)

15 October 2011 11	Hajduk Split	3–1	Osijek	Split
20:00 CEST (UTC+02:00)	Vukušić 10', 39'; Tomasov 61'	Report	Ljubojević 31'; Vrgoč (yellow card) 51' (yellow-red card) 77'; Lešković (yellow card) 59'	Stadium: Stadion Poljud; Attendance: 8,000; Referee: Ivo Krečak (Šibenik)

21 October 2011 12	Lučko	0–3	Hajduk Split	Zagreb
17:00 CEST (UTC+02:00)		Report	Tomasov 5'; Inoha 60'; Vukušić 77'	Stadium: Stadion Kranjčevićeva; Attendance: 3,500; Referee: Domagoj Ljubičić (Osijek)

30 October 2011 13	Hajduk Split	1–2	Inter Zaprešić	Split
17:00 CET (UTC+01:00)	An. Sharbini (yellow card) 34'; Maloča 38'; James (yellow card) 75'; Kukoč (yellow card) 90'	Report	Abilaliaj 3'; Valentić (yellow card) 21'; Oršić 26'; Jančetić (yellow card) 32'	Stadium: Stadion Poljud; Attendance: 15,000; Referee: Damir Batinić (Osijek)

5 November 2011 14	Hajduk Split	3–0	Varaždin	Split
17:00 CET (UTC+01:00)	Vuković 2'; Luštica 19'; Tomasov 40'	Report	Šimek (yellow card) 63'; Sačer (yellow card) 79'	Stadium: Stadion Poljud; Attendance: 5,000; Referee: Danijel Trampus (Osijek)

19 November 2011 15	Lokomotiva	1–0	Hajduk Split	Zagreb
17:00 CET (UTC+01:00)	Poljak 41' (pen.)	Report	Maloča (red card) 82'; Subašić (yellow card) 82'; Andrić (yellow card) 85'; An. Sharbini (yellow card) 87'	Stadium: Stadion Maksimir; Attendance: 500; Referee: Domagoj Ljubičić (Osijek)

26 November 2011 16	Šibenik	1–2	Hajduk Split	Šibenik
17:00 CET (UTC+01:00)	Živković 61'	Report	Lendrić 5', 45'	Stadium: Stadion Šubićevac; Attendance: 3,000; Referee: Vlado Svilokos (Sisak)

4 December 2011 17	Hajduk Split	1–0	Zadar	Split
15:30 CET (UTC+01:00)	An. Sharbini 74'; Milić (yellow card) 89'	Report	Banović (yellow card) 18'	Stadium: Stadion Poljud; Attendance: 4,000; Referee: Ivan Bebek (Rijeka)

25 February 2012 19	Hajduk Split	1–1	Istra 1961	Split
15:30 CET (UTC+01:00)	Neretljak (yellow card) 82'; Vukušić 89'	Report	Pamić (yellow card) 46'; Križman 53'; Belle (yellow card) 90'	Stadium: Stadion Poljud; Attendance: 10,000; Referee: Vlado Svilokos (Sisak)

2 March 2012 20	NK Zagreb	2–4	Hajduk Split	Zagreb
17:30 CET (UTC+01:00)	Oršulić (yellow card) 34'; Abdurahimi 40'; Šovšić 90+1'	Report	An. Sharbini 19', 43'; Gabrić 44'; Vukušić 63'	Stadium: Stadion Kranjčevićeva; Attendance: 3,000; Referee: Zlatko Šimčić (Koprivnica)

10 March 2012 21	Hajduk Split	0–0	RNK Split	Split
18:00 CET (UTC+01:00)	Vukušić (yellow card) 44'	Report	Pehar (yellow card) 55'	Stadium: Stadion Poljud; Attendance: 12,000; Referee: Goran Gabrilo (Split)

17 March 2012 22	Dinamo Zagreb	2–1	Hajduk Split	Zagreb
15:00 CET (UTC+01:00)	Leko (yellow card) 57'; Krstanović 80', 82' (pen.)	Report	Vukušić 14'; Rúben Lima (yellow card) 59'; Gabrić (yellow card) 71'; Ozobić (yellow card) 81'; James (yellow card) 82'	Stadium: Stadion Maksimir; Attendance: 16,000; Referee: Ivan Bebek (Rijeka)

21 March 2012 18	Rijeka	0–3	Hajduk Split	Rijeka
18:00 CET (UTC+01:00)		Report	Vukušić 16', 79'; Caktaš 60'	Stadium: Stadion Kantrida; Attendance: 5,000; Referee: Dalibor Mlakar (Zagreb)

25 March 2012 23	Hajduk Split	1–0	Cibalia	Split
17:00 CET (UTC+01:00)	Caktaš 36'; Ozobić (yellow card) 71'; An. Sharbini (yellow card) 78'	Report	Radotić (yellow card) 37'; Čuljak (yellow card) 72'	Stadium: Stadion Poljud; Attendance: 6,000; Referee: Mario Zebec (Cestica)

31 March 2012 24	Slaven Belupo	1–1	Hajduk Split	Koprivnica
17:00 CEST (UTC+02:00)	Gregurina (yellow card) 24'; Brezovec (yellow card) 53' (goal) 81'	Report	Rúben Lima (yellow card) 4'; Milović (yellow card) 22'; James (yellow card) 53'; Lendrić 58' (yellow card) 59'	Stadium: Gradski stadion Attendance: 3,000; Referee: Domagoj Vučkov (Rijeka)

7 April 2012 25	Hajduk Split	1–0	Karlovac	Split
18:00 CEST (UTC+02:00)	Vukušić 57' (pen.); Jozinović (yellow card) 67'	Report	Bektaši (yellow card) 19'; Jelavić (yellow card) 66'	Stadium: Stadion Poljud; Attendance: 4,000; Referee: Ivo Krečak (Šibenik)

14 April 2012 26	Osijek	2–1	Hajduk Split	Osijek
18:00 CEST (UTC+02:00)	Ibriks (yellow card) 16'; Perošević 26'; Smoje (yellow card) 45'; Šorša 52'; Maglica (yellow card) 86'	Report	Neretljak 43'; Andrić (yellow card) 45'; Tomaš (yellow card) 49'	Stadium: Stadion Gradski vrt Attendance: 3,500; Referee: Domagoj Vučkov (Rijeka)

21 April 2012 27	Hajduk Split	1–2	Lučko	Split
19:00 CEST (UTC+02:00)	James (yellow card) 33'; Vuković 45+1' (yellow card) 54'	Report	Sarić (yellow card) 33' (goal) 40'; Petrak 48'; Žižić (yellow card) 62'; Blagojević (yellow card) 68'	Stadium: Stadion Poljud; Attendance: 2,000; Referee: Damir Batinić (Osijek)

27 April 2012 28	Inter Zaprešić	1–0	Hajduk Split	Zaprešić
19:00 CEST (UTC+02:00)	Oršić 22'; Mlinar (yellow card) 68'	Report	Elez (yellow card) 70'; Barišić (yellow card) 77'	Stadium: Stadion ŠRC Zaprešić; Attendance: 2,500; Referee: Dalibor Mlakar (Zagreb)

5 May 2012 29	Varaždin	0–3 (Awarded)	Hajduk Split	Varaždin
				Stadium: Stadion Varteks
Note: Varaždin was expelled from the league so the match was awarded as a 3–0 forfeit win to Hajduk Split.

12 May 2012 30	Hajduk Split	0–1	Lokomotiva	Split
19:00 CEST (UTC+02:00)	Jozinović (yellow card) 17'; Vladislavić (yellow card) 21'; Vuković (yellow card) 78'	Report	Kramarić 13' (penalty missed) 59'; Puljić (yellow card) 67'; Lilaj (yellow card) 69'; Šitum (yellow card) 90+2'	Stadium: Stadion Poljud; Attendance: 2,000; Referee: Damir Batinić (Osijek)

Source: HRnogomet.com

=== Croatian Football Cup ===
15 September 2011 R1	Jadran Gunja	1–5	Hajduk Split	Gunja
15:30 CEST (UTC+02:00)	Đalok (yellow card) 43'; Alić 56' (pen.); Perić (yellow card) 66'	Report	Lendrić 28', 80'; Sarić 37'; Vuković 72' (pen.); Andrić 78'; Kukoč (yellow card) 85'	Stadium: Luka Šokčević-Šaljapin; Attendance: 2,000; Referee: Mario Novak (Osijek)

26 October 2011 R2	Hajduk Split	3–2	Karlovac	Split
18:00 CEST (UTC+02:00)	Vukušić 4', 57'; Sarić 19'; Maloča (yellow card) 90'	Report	Miljković (yellow card) 15'; Kutleša (yellow card) 25'; Janković (yellow card) 62'; Ivičić 69'; Štefančić 90+1'	Stadium: Stadion Poljud; Attendance: 5,000; Referee: Igor Križarić (Čakovec)

23 November 2011 QF	Hajduk Split	1–0	NK Zagreb	Split
16:00 CET (UTC+01:00)	Vukušić 62'	Report	Šovšić (yellow card) 23'; Pelaić (yellow card) 66'; Maleš (yellow card) 78'	Stadium: Stadion Poljud; Attendance: 2,000; Referee: Damir Batinić (Osijek)

30 November 2011 QF	NK Zagreb	1–0 (1–1 agg.) (5–4 p)	Hajduk Split	Zagreb
18:00 CET (UTC+01:00)	Medić (yellow card) 35'; Dedić 87'	Report; Penalties	Radošević (yellow card) 28'; Vukušić (yellow card) 86'	Stadium: Stadion Kranjčevićeva; Attendance: 1,000; Referee: Domagoj Vučkov (Rijeka)
	Penalties
	Oršulić (penalty scored); Jurendić (penalty scored); Štiglec (penalty scored); Šovšić (penalty scored); Pavlović (penalty scored)		(penalty scored) Vukušić; (penalty scored) Andrić; (penalty missed) Ah. Sharbini; (penalty scored) Maloča; (penalty scored) Subašić

Source: HRnogomet.com

=== Europa League ===
==== Third qualifying round ====
28 July 2011 First leg	Stoke City (England)	1–0	(Croatia) Hajduk Split	Stoke-on-Trent, England
19:45 WEST (UTC+01:00)	Walters 3'; Huth (yellow card) 83'	Report		Stadium: Britannia Stadium; Attendance: 26,322; Referee: Babak Rafati (Germany)

4 August 2011 Second leg	Hajduk Split (Croatia)	0–1 (0–2 agg.)	(England) Stoke City	Split, Croatia
19:00 CEST (UTC+02:00)	Miličević (yellow card) 30'; Andrić (yellow card) 39'; Sarić (yellow card) 90'	Report	Begović (yellow card) 61'; Whitehead (yellow card) 64'; Pennant (yellow card) 82'; Etherington (yellow card) 90+1'; Miličević 90+1' (o.g.)	Stadium: Stadion Poljud; Attendance: 35,000; Referee: Andrea De Marco (Italy)

Source: uefa.com

== Player seasonal records ==
Competitive matches only. Updated to games played 12 May 2012.

=== Top scorers ===
Rank	Name	League	Cup	Total
1	(Croatia) Ante Vukušić	12	3	15
2	(Croatia) Marin Tomasov	8	–	8
3	(Croatia) Anas Sharbini	7	–	7
4	(Croatia) Ivan Lendrić	4	2	6
5	(Croatia) Srđan Andrić	2	1	3
5	(Croatia) Ahmad Sharbini	3	–	3
5	(Montenegro) Ivan Vuković	2	1	3
8	(Croatia) Mijo Caktaš	2	–	2
8	(Croatia) Tonći Kukoč	2	–	2
8	(Denmark) Nikola Sarić	–	2	2
11	(Croatia) Drago Gabrić	1	–	1
11	(Japan) Masahiko Inoha	1	–	1
11	(Australia) Steven Luštica	1	–	1
11	(Croatia) Mario Maloča	1	–	1
11	(Croatia) Mato Neretljak	1	–	1
	TOTALS	47	9	56

Source: Competitive matches

=== Disciplinary record ===
Includes all competitive matches. Players with 1 card or more included only.

Number	Position	Name	1. HNL (Note: Two yellow cards resulting in a red are counted as a total of three cards - i.e. two yellow and one red card.)		Europa League		Croatian Cup		Total	
Number	Position	Name	Booked	Sent off (straight red)	Booked	Sent off (straight red)	Booked	Sent off (straight red)	Booked	Sent off (straight red)
1	GK	(Croatia) Danijel Subašić	1	0	0	0	0	0	1	0
2	MF	(Croatia) Josip Radošević	0	0	0	0	1	0	1	0
3	MF	(Croatia) Frane Vladislavić	1	0	0	0	0	0	1	0
4	DF	(Croatia) Antonio Milić	1	0	0	0	0	0	1	0
5	DF	(Croatia) Goran Milović	1	0	0	0	0	0	1	0
5	DF	(Australia) Ljubo Miličević	0	0	1	0	0	0	1	0
7	DF	(Croatia) Filip Ozobić	2	0	0	0	0	0	2	0
8	MF	(Croatia) Krešo Ljubičić	1	0	0	0	0	0	1	0
9	FW	(Croatia) Ahmad Sharbini	2	0	0	0	0	0	2	0
11	MF	(Croatia) Srđan Andrić	6	0	1	0	0	0	7	0
13	FW	(Croatia) Ante Vukušić	1	0	0	0	1	0	2	0
15	FW	(Croatia) Ivan Lendrić	1	0	0	0	0	0	1	0
16	MF	(Croatia) Ivo-Valentino Tomaš	1	0	0	0	0	0	1	0
17	MF	(Croatia) Tonći Kukoč	2	0	0	0	1	0	3	0
19	DF	(Croatia) Josip Elez	1	0	0	0	0	0	1	0
20	DF	(Croatia) Goran Jozinović	2	0	0	0	0	0	2	0
21	MF	(Croatia) Mario Brkljača	3	1	0	0	0	0	3	1
22	DF	(Croatia) Mario Maloča	2	1	0	0	1	0	3	1
23	DF	(Croatia) Mato Neretljak	1	0	0	0	0	0	1	0
24	FW	(Montenegro) Ivan Vuković	2	0	0	0	0	0	2	0
28	DF	(Portugal) Ruben Lima	4	0	0	0	0	0	4	0
29	DF	(Croatia) Marko Barišić	1	0	0	0	0	0	1	0
33	DF	(Brazil) James Dens	4	0	0	0	0	0	4	0
77	MF	(Croatia) Drago Gabrić	1	0	0	0	0	0	1	0
91	FW	(Denmark) Nikola Sarić	0	0	1	0	0	0	1	0
99	MF	(Croatia) Anas Sharbini	6	0	0	0	0	0	6	0
		TOTALS	47	2	3	0	4	0	54	2

Sources: Prva-HNL.hr, UEFA.com

=== Appearances and goals ===
Number	Position	Player	Apps	Goals	Apps	Goals	Apps	Goals	Apps	Goals
Number	Position	Player	Total		1. HNL (Note: First number represents appearances in starting eleven, while the second number indicates a substitute appearance.)		Europa League		Croatian Cup	
1	GK	(Croatia) Goran Blažević	12	0	12+0	0	0+0	0	0+0	0
1	GK	(Croatia) Danijel Subašić	20	0	16+0	0	2+0	0	2+0	0
2	MF	(Croatia) Josip Radošević	9	0	7+0	0	0+0	0	2+0	0
3	MF	(Croatia) Frane Vladislavić	1	0	1+0	0	0+0	0	0+0	0
4	DF	(Croatia) Antonio Milić	5	0	0+2	0	0+0	0	2+1	0
5	DF	(Croatia) Goran Milović	10	0	9+1	0	0+0	0	0+0	0
5	DF	(Australia) Ljubo Miličević	5	0	4+0	0	1+0	0	0+0	0
7	MF	(Croatia) Filip Ozobić	10	0	10+0	0	0+0	0	0+0	0
7	DF	(Croatia) Hrvoje Vejić	3	0	2+0	0	1+0	0	0+0	0
8	MF	(Croatia) Krešo Ljubičić	7	0	3+2	0	0+1	0	0+1	0
9	FW	(Croatia) Ahmad Sharbini	20	3	10+5	3	0+2	0	1+2	0
10	MF	(Croatia) Dinko Trebotić	7	0	2+4	0	1+0	0	0+0	0
11	MF	(Croatia) Srđan Andrić	26	3	20+0	2	2+0	0	4+0	1
12	GK	(Croatia) Lovre Kalinić	3	0	1+0	0	0+0	0	2+0	0
13	FW	(Croatia) Ante Vukušić	29	15	21+3	12	2+0	0	3+0	3
14	MF	(Croatia) Duje Medak	1	0	1+0	0	0+0	0	0+0	0
14	MF	(Croatia) Marin Tomasov	21	8	15+2	8	2+0	0	2+0	0
15	FW	(Croatia) Ivan Lendrić	21	6	4+15	4	0+0	0	1+1	2
16	MF	(Croatia) Ivo-Valentino Tomaš	3	0	2+1	0	0+0	0	0+0	0
16	MF	(Australia) Steven Luštica	11	1	8+2	1	0+0	0	1+0	0
17	MF	(Croatia) Tonći Kukoč	25	2	11+9	2	0+1	0	1+3	0
18	MF	(Croatia) Mijo Caktaš	11	2	11+0	2	0+0	0	0+0	0
18	MF	(Croatia) Mirko Oremuš	2	0	1+0	0	1+0	0	0+0	0
19	DF	(Croatia) Josip Elez	1	0	0+1	0	0+0	0	0+0	0
19	DF	(Japan) Masahiko Inoha	19	1	13+2	1	1+0	0	2+1	0
20	DF	(Croatia) Goran Jozinović	3	0	2+1	0	0+0	0	0+0	0
21	MF	(Croatia) Jure Obšivač	6	0	1+5	0	0+0	0	0+0	0
21	MF	(Croatia) Mario Brkljača	13	0	8+2	0	2+0	0	0+1	0
22	DF	(Croatia) Mario Maloča	19	1	14+0	1	2+0	0	3+0	0
23	DF	(Croatia) Mato Neretljak	12	1	12+0	1	0+0	0	0+0	0
23	FW	(Croatia) Mario Jelavić	2	0	0+1	0	0+0	0	1+0	0
24	FW	(Montenegro) Ivan Vuković	23	3	9+11	2	1+1	0	1+0	1
24	MF	(Croatia) Mario Tičinović	6	0	2+4	0	0+0	0	0+0	0
26	FW	(Croatia) Ivan Pešić	1	0	0+0	0	0+0	0	1+0	0
27	MF	(Croatia) Franko Andrijašević	12	0	11+1	0	0+0	0	0+0	0
27	DF	(Croatia) Tomislav Glumac	1	0	0+1	0	0+0	0	0+0	0
28	DF	(Portugal) Ruben Lima	29	0	23+0	0	2+0	0	4+0	0
29	DF	(Croatia) Marko Barišić	5	0	3+0	0	0+0	0	1+1	0
30	FW	(Croatia) Tomislav Kiš	5	0	2+3	0	0+0	0	0+0	0
31	MF	(Croatia) Joško Hajder	1	0	0+1	0	0+0	0	0+0	0
33	DF	(Brazil) James Dens	22	0	20+0	0	0+0	0	2+0	0
77	MF	(Croatia) Drago Gabrić	12	1	6+4	1	0+0	0	2+0	0
91	FW	(Denmark) Nikola Sarić	9	2	0+4	0	0+1	0	3+1	2
99	MF	(Croatia) Anas Sharbini	27	7	22+0	7	2+0	0	3+0	0

Sources: Prva-HNL.hr, UEFA.com

== Transfers ==
=== In ===
Date	Position	Player	From	Fee
8 June 2011	DF	(Australia) Ljubo Miličević	South Melbourne	Free
8 June 2011	MF	(Australia) Steven Luštica	Gold Coast United	Free
2 July 2011	DF	(Brazil) James Dens	NK Zagreb	Free
2 July 2011	FW	(Montenegro) Ivan Vuković	Budućnost	450,000 €
2 July 2011	FW	(Denmark) Nikola Sarić	Liverpool	Free
2 July 2011	DF	(Portugal) Ruben Lima	Beira-Mar	Free
8 July 2011	DF	(Japan) Masahiko Inoha	Kashima Antlers	200,000 €
22 September 2011	MF	(Croatia) Drago Gabrić	Trabzonspor	Free
9 January 2012	DF	(Croatia) Goran Milović	RNK Split	Exchange
11 January 2012	GK	(Croatia) Goran Blažević	Šibenik	Free
23 January 2012	DF	(Croatia) Mato Neretljak	Suwon Bluewings	Free

=== Out ===
Date	Position	Player	To	Fee
21 June 2011	DF	(Croatia) Jurica Buljat	Maccabi Haifa	1,000,000 €
23 June 2011	MF	(Croatia) Marin Zulim	Lučko	Free
30 June 2011	MF	(Albania) Ervin Bulku	AZAL PFC	Free
1 July 2011	FW	(Croatia) Duje Čop	RNK Split	Free
3 July 2011	MF	(Croatia) Marin Ljubičić	Tavriya Simferopol	400,000 €
16 July 2011	MF	(Croatia) Mislav Leko	Karlovac	Free
3 August 2011	GK	(Croatia) Božidar Radošević	Budućnost Podgorica	Free
28 December 2011	MF	(Croatia) Mario Brkljača	Sibir Novosibirsk	50,000 €
9 January 2012	DF	(Croatia) Tomislav Glumac	RNK Split	Exchange
23 January 2012	FW	(Denmark) Nikola Sarić	HB Køge	Free
27 January 2012	GK	(Croatia) Danijel Subašić	AS Monaco	Undisclosed
3 February 2012	DF	(Japan) Masahiko Inoha	Vissel Kobe	Free
19 April 2012	MF	(Croatia) Marin Tomasov	Zadar	Free

=== Loans in ===
Date	Position	Player	From	Until
10 January 2012	MF	(Croatia) Filip Ozobić	Spartak Moscow	30 June 2012

=== Loans out ===
Date	Position	Player	To	Until
30 June 2011	DF	(Croatia) Matej Jonjić	Zadar	2 January 2012
10 July 2011	FW	(Croatia) Mario Sačer	Varaždin	31 December 2011
20 August 2011	MF	(Croatia) Franko Andrijašević	Dugopolje	23 January 2012
31 August 2011	MF	(Croatia) Mirko Oremuš	Hapoel Tel Aviv	31 May 2012
2 September 2011	MF	(Croatia) Ante Režić	Šibenik	31 December 2011
2 September 2011	FW	(Croatia) Hrvoje Tokić	Vinogradar	11 January 2012
11 January 2012	FW	(Croatia) Hrvoje Tokić	Zadar	30 June 2012
18 January 2012	GK	(Croatia) Lovre Kalinić	Karlovac	30 June 2012
25 January 2012	MF	(Australia) Steven Luštica	Dugopolje	30 June 2012
1 February 2012	MF	(Croatia) Mario Tičinović	Nordsjælland	30 May 2012
1 February 2012	MF	(Croatia) Ante Režić	Varaždin	30 June 2012
6 February 2012	MF	(Croatia) Dinko Trebotić	NK Zagreb	30 June 2012
10 February 2012	MF	(Croatia) Marko Bencun	Dugopolje	30 June 2012
12 February 2012	DF	(Croatia) Marijan Buljat	Primorac 1929	30 June 2012
12 February 2012	DF	(Croatia) Hrvoje Vejić	Primorac 1929	30 June 2012

Sources: nogometni-magazin.com
