= 2014–15 HNK Hajduk Split season =

Hajduk Split
2014–15 season
- Chairman: Marin Brbić
- Manager: Igor Tudor (until 4 February 2015); Hari Vukas (caretaker) (from 5 February to 19 February 2015); Stanko Poklepović (from 19 February to 13 April 2015); Goran Vučević (interim) (from 13 April to 23 April 2015); Hari Vukas (interim) (from 24 April 2015)
- Prva HNL: 3rd
- Croatian Cup: Semi-final
- Europa League: Play-off round
- Top goalscorer: League: Caktaš, Gotal (9); All: Gotal, Maglica (12)
- Highest home attendance: 34,000 vs D. Dnipropetrovsk (28 August 2014)
- Lowest home attendance: 0 (Three matches)
- Average home league attendance: 6,670
Home colours	Away colours

The 2014–15 season was the 104th season in Hajduk Split’s history and their twenty-fourth in the Prva HNL. Their 3rd place finish in the 2013–14 season means it was their 24th successive season playing in the Prva HNL.

== First-team squad ==
As of 8 March 2015

Note: Flags indicate national team as defined under FIFA eligibility rules; some limited exceptions apply. Players may hold more than one non-FIFA nationality.

No.	Pos.	Nation	Player
1	GK	SVN	Marko Ranilović
2	DF	CRO	Dino Mikanović
4	DF	CRO	Petar Bosančić
5	DF	CRO	Goran Milović
6	DF	BIH	Avdija Vršajević
7	MF	AZE	Ruslan Qurbanov (on loan from Neftchi)
8	MF	CRO	Nikola Vlašić
9	FW	CRO	Anton Maglica
10	FW	UKR	Artem Milevskyi
11	FW	AUT	Sandro Gotal
13	GK	CRO	Ivo Grbić
14	MF	CRO	Ivan Anton Vasilj
17	DF	CRO	Goran Jozinović
18	MF	CRO	Mijo Caktaš
19	FW	ALB	Elvir Maloku

No.	Pos.	Nation	Player
22	DF	CRO	Mario Maloča (Captain)
23	DF	CRO	Zoran Nižić
24	DF	CRO	Marko Pejić
25	GK	CRO	Dante Stipica
26	MF	CRO	Josip Vuković
27	DF	CRO	Zvonimir Milić
30	MF	CRO	Josip Bašić
31	MF	BIH	Tino-Sven Sušić
32	MF	CRO	Fran Tudor
44	DF	AUT	David Domej
77	MF	CRO	Josip Juranović
78	MF	CRO	Dejan Mezga
91	GK	CRO	Lovre Kalinić
99	MF	CRO	Andrija Balić

== Competitions ==
=== Overall record ===
Performance by competition
Competition	Starting round	Final position/round	First match	Last match
Prva HNL	—N/a	3rd	21 July 2014	29 May 2015
Croatian Football Cup	First round	Semi-final	24 September 2014	22 April 2015
UEFA Europa League	Second qualifying round	Play-off round	17 July 2014	28 August 2014

Statistics by competition
Competition	Pld	W	D	L	GF	GA	GD	Win%
Prva HNL	36	15	8	13	59	56	+3	41.67
Croatian Football Cup	6	4	1	1	12	4	+8	66.67
UEFA Europa League	6	2	1	3	9	7	+2	33.33
Total	48	21	10	17	80	67	+13	43.75

=== Prva HNL ===
==== Classification ====
Pos	Team	Pld	W	D	L	GF	GA	GD	Pts	Qualification or relegation
1	Dinamo Zagreb (C)	36	26	10	0	85	21	+64	88	Qualification to Champions League second qualifying round
2	Rijeka	36	22	9	5	76	29	+47	75	Qualification to Europa League second qualifying round
3	Hajduk Split (Note: Hajduk Split were deducted 3 points for not showing up for the match against Dinamo Zagreb in the 16th round.)	36	15	8	13	59	56	+3	50	Qualification to Europa League first qualifying round
4	Lokomotiva	36	13	7	16	59	68	−9	46	Qualification to Europa League first qualifying round
5	NK Zagreb	36	13	7	16	45	54	−9	46	

Source: Sportnet.hr
Rules for classification: 1) points; 2) goal difference; 3) number of goals scored.
For deciding champions, qualification to UEFA Europa League and relegation: 1st points; 2nd head-to-head points; 3rd head-to-head goal difference; 4th head-to-head away goals scored
(C) Champions

==== Results summary ====
Overall								Home						Away					
Pld	W	D	L	GF	GA	GD	Pts	W	D	L	GF	GA	GD	W	D	L	GF	GA	GD
36	15	8	13	59	56	+3	53	9	5	4	36	25	+11	6	3	9	23	31	−8

Last updated: 29 May 2015.
Source: Sportnet.hr

==== Results by round ====
Round	1	2	3	4	5	6	7	8	9	10	11	12	13	14	15	16	17	18	19	20	21	22	23	24	25	26	27	28	29	30	31	32	33	34	35	36
Ground	H	A	H	A	H	A	H	A	A	A	H	A	H	A	H	A	H	H	H	A	H	A	H	A	H	A	H	A	H	A	H	A	H	A	H	A
Result	D	L	W	W	W	L	L	D	D	W	D	W	D	W	W	L	L	W	W	L	W	L	D	W	D	L	L	L	L	W	W	L	W	L	W	D
Position	5	8	4	3	3	3	3	3	3	3	3	3	3	3	3	3	3	3	3	3	3	4	4	4	4	4	4	4	4	4	3	3	3	3	3	3

Source: Competitive matches
A = Away; H = Home; W = Win; D = Draw; L = Loss

==== Results by opponent ====
Team	Results				Points
Team	1	2	3	4	Points
Dinamo Zagreb	2–3	0–3	1–1	0–4	1
Istra 1961	1–1	2–0	5–3	2–3	7
Lokomotiva	5–2	2–2	1–2	2–1	7
Osijek	0–2	2–1	1–0	3–2	9
Rijeka	1–4	1–1	0–3	1–2	1
Slaven Belupo	2–0	1–0	2–1	2–0	12
RNK Split	1–1	2–1	1–2	1–1	5
Zadar	6–0	3–0	2–2	0–2	7
NK Zagreb	2–2	0–2	0–2	1–0	4

Source: 2014–15 Croatian First Football League article

== Matches ==
=== Friendlies ===
==== Pre-season ====
Match	Date	Venue	Opponent	Score	Attendance	Hajduk Scorers	Report
1	21 Jun	A	Omladinac Vranjic	10 – 2	1,500	Vlašić, Gotal (3), Kouassi, Bencun, Vuković, Abdukholiqov (2), Tomičić	hajduk.hr
2	28 Jun	A (Slovenia)	Domžale (Slovenia)	2 – 2	800	A. Milić, Maglica	hajduk.hr
3	1 Jul	N (Slovenia)	Rabotnički (North Macedonia)	0 – 2	–		hajduk.hr
4	3 Jul	N (Slovenia)	Metalurh Zaporizhya (Ukraine)	0 – 0	–		hajduk.hr
5	6 Jul	N (Slovenia)	Kuban Krasnodar (Russia)	0 – 3	–		hajduk.hr
6	9 Jul	N (Slovenia)	Rubin Kazan (Russia)	1 – 1	–	Caktaš	hajduk.hr

==== On-season ====
Match	Date	Venue	Opponent	Score	Attendance	Hajduk Scorers	Report
1	6 Sep	A (Czech Republic)	Slavia Prague (Czech Republic)	0 – 2	5,823		slavia.cz
2	9 Mar	A	Sladorana Županja	4 – 0	–	Qurbanov, Prskalo, Juranović (2)	hajduk.hr
3	27 Mar	A	Vodice	7 – 1	–	Caktaš (4), Maglica, Milevskyi, Prskalo	hajduk.hr
4	12 Apr	A	Rovinj	7 – 1	–	Qurbanov, Vlašić (2), Gotal (3), Mikanović	hajduk.hr
5	17 May	A	Varteks	4 – 0	1,000	Demir, Tudor, Qurbanov, Puljić	hajduk.hr

==== Mid-season ====
Match	Date	Venue	Opponent	Score	Attendance	Hajduk Scorers	Report
1	16 Jan	A (Bosnia and Herzegovina)	GOŠK Gabela (Bosnia and Herzegovina)	2 – 2 (2 – 3 p)	300	Ducasse, Balić	hajduk.hr
2	17 Jan	N (Bosnia and Herzegovina)	Željezničar (Bosnia and Herzegovina)	1 – 1 (4 – 5 p)	100	Mezga	hajduk.hr
3	21 Jan	N	Krka (Slovenia)	1 – 0	–	Milevskyi	hajduk.hr
4	24 Jan	A	Jadran Poreč	3 – 1	1,000	Vlašić (2), Vasilj	hajduk.hr
5	28 Jan	N	Ankaran Hrvatini (Slovenia)	7 – 0	–	Kouassi, Maglica (2), Milović, Vlašić, Juranović, Maloku	hajduk.hr
6	31 Jan	A (Slovenia)	Koper (Slovenia)	0 – 2			hajduk.hr

=== Prva HNL ===
20 July 2014 1	Hajduk Split	1–1	Istra 1961	Split
21:00 CEST (UTC+02:00)	Gotal 20' (yellow card) 61'; Milović (yellow card) 69'; Maloča (yellow card) 87'; Bradarić (yellow card) 87'; Stipica (yellow card) 90+4'	Report	Ivančić 43'; Špehar (yellow card) 45+1'; Blagojević (yellow card) 47'; Pavlović (yellow card) 90+4'	Stadium: Stadion Poljud; Attendance: 12,000; Referee: Domagoj Ljubičić (Osijek)

27 July 2014 2	Rijeka	4–2	Hajduk Split	Rijeka
21:00 CEST (UTC+02:00)	Kramarić 10', 21', 30'; Sharbini 40'; Brezovec (yellow card) 71'	Report	Kouassi 13'; Maloča (yellow card) 41'; Caktaš 83'	Stadium: Stadion Kantrida; Attendance: 9,000; Referee: Mario Zebec (Cestica)

3 August 2014 3	Hajduk Split	2–0	Slaven Belupo	Split
21:00 CEST (UTC+02:00)	Anđelković (yellow card) 22'; Caktaš 43'; Maglica 78'; A. Milić (yellow card) 86'	Report	Purić (yellow card) 38'; Plazanić (yellow card) 66'; Geng (yellow card) 81'; Grgić (yellow card) 90+1'	Stadium: Stadion Poljud; Attendance: 9,000; Referee: Damir Batinić (Osijek)

10 August 2014 4	Lokomotiva	2–5	Hajduk Split	Zagreb
19:00 CEST (UTC+02:00)	Mišić 2'; Pajač (yellow card) 11' (yellow-red card) 44'; Begonja (yellow card) 63'; Mrčela 71'; Prenga (yellow card) 90'	Report	Kouassi 1', 90'; Gotal 18', 20'; Maglica (yellow card) 58'; Maloku (yellow card) 63'; Maloča 65' (pen.)	Stadium: Stadion Kranjčevićeva; Attendance: 2,000; Referee: Marin Vidulin (Kanfanar)

16 August 2014 5	Hajduk Split	6–0	Zadar	Split
21:00 CEST (UTC+02:00)	Caktaš 12' (pen.); Maglica 25', 72'; Maloča (yellow card) 31'; Kouassi 32', 52'; Gotal 55'; Vlašić (yellow card) 86'	Report	Sarić (yellow card) 11'; Hrgović (yellow card) 17'; Jerbić (yellow card) 36'; Surać (yellow card) 75'	Stadium: Stadion Poljud; Attendance: 10,000; Referee: Željko Frković (Gospić)

24 August 2014 6	Osijek	2–0	Hajduk Split	Osijek
19:00 CEST (UTC+02:00)	Kurtović (yellow card) 17'; Baraban 27'; Mišić (yellow card) 32'; Mešanović (yellow card) 57'; Glavaš 73'; Jonjić (yellow card) 76'	Report	Vuković (yellow card) 29'; Mikanović (yellow card) 87'	Stadium: Stadion Gradski vrt Attendance: 8,000; Referee: Marijo Strahonja (Zaprešić)

31 August 2014 7	Hajduk Split	2–3	Dinamo Zagreb	Split
19:00 CEST (UTC+02:00)	Sušić 8' (yellow card) 74'; Vršajević (yellow card) 10'; Caktaš (yellow card) 30'; Anđelković (yellow card) 43'; A. Milić 49'; Maglica (yellow card) 61'; Milić (yellow card) 86'; Bradarić (yellow card) 90'	Report	Šimunović (yellow card) 61'; Čop 71', 90+1'; Šimunić (yellow card) 90+3'; Henríquez 90+4'	Stadium: Stadion Poljud; Attendance: 16,072; Referee: Ivan Bebek (Rijeka)

14 September 2014 8	NK Zagreb	2–2	Hajduk Split	Zagreb
19:00 CEST (UTC+02:00)	Jurendić 2'; Medić 17'; Šulc (yellow card) 22'; Boban (yellow card) 62'; Musa (yellow card) 83'	Report	Vršajević (yellow card) 30' (goal) 40'; Jozinović (yellow card) 32'; Maloča (yellow card) 38'; Kouassi 45'; Bradarić (yellow card) 78'	Stadium: Stadion Kranjčevićeva; Attendance: 1,500; Referee: Igor Križarić (Čakovec)

20 September 2014 9	RNK Split	1–1	Hajduk Split	Split
19:00 CEST (UTC+02:00)	Glavina (yellow card) 14'; Galović 40'; Rog (yellow card) 74'; Roce (yellow card) 88'	Report	Caktaš (yellow card) 15'; A. Milić (yellow card) 25'; Maglica 27' (yellow card) 90'; Vršajević (yellow card) 49'; Mezga (yellow card) 81'	Stadium: Stadion Park Mladeži; Attendance: 3,000; Referee: Duje Strukan (Split)

28 September 2014 10	Istra 1961	0–2	Hajduk Split	Pula
19:00 CEST (UTC+02:00)	Matoš (yellow card) 58'; Pamić (yellow card) 71'; Woon (yellow card) 86'	Report	Kouassi (yellow card) 26'; Milović (yellow card) 42'; Gotal (yellow card) 44'; Sušić 51'; Bradarić 59'	Stadium: Stadion Aldo Drosina; Attendance: 4,000; Referee: Mario Zebec (Cestica)

5 October 2014 11	Hajduk Split	1–1	Rijeka	Dugopolje
16:00 CEST (UTC+02:00)	Caktaš 21' (pen.); Maloča (yellow card) 45+3'; A. Milić (yellow card) 51'; Gotal (yellow card) 52'; Vuković (yellow card) 87'; Mezga (yellow card) 90+1'	Report	Leovac (yellow card) 27'; Kvržić 64'; Mitrović (yellow card) 85'	Stadium: Stadion Hrvatski vitezovi Attendance: 5,500; Referee: Fran Jović (Zagreb)

19 October 2014 12	Slaven Belupo	0–1	Hajduk Split	Koprivnica
19:00 CEST (UTC+02:00)	Grgić (yellow card) 58'	Report	Sušić 32'; Bašić (yellow card) 79'	Stadium: Gradski stadion Attendance: 3,000; Referee: Tihomir Pejin (Donji Miholjac)

25 October 2014 13	Hajduk Split	2–2	Lokomotiva	Split
19:00 CEST (UTC+02:00)	Maloku 86'; Milevskyi 89'	Report	Begonja (yellow card) 20'; Marić 29'; Pavičić 67'	Stadium: Stadion Poljud; Attendance: 0 Referee: Domagoj Vučkov (Rijeka)

2 November 2014 14	Zadar	0–3	Hajduk Split	Zadar
19:00 CET (UTC+01:00)	Hrgović (yellow card) 39'; Bilaver (yellow card) 40'; Ješe (yellow card) 63'; Buljat (yellow card) 90+2'	Report	Milović (yellow card) 22'; Vršajević 28' (yellow card) 39'; Caktaš 41' (pen.); Vlašić 84'; Anđelković (yellow card) 88'	Stadium: Stadion Stanovi; Attendance: 3,500; Referee: Marijo Strahonja (Zaprešić)

8 November 2014 15	Hajduk Split	2–1	Osijek	Split
19:00 CET (UTC+01:00)	Caktaš 54' (yellow card) 60'; Gotal 63'; Nižić (yellow card) 68'; Bradarić (yellow card) 70'; Milevskyi (yellow card) 78'	Report	Šorša (yellow card) 33'; Jonjić (yellow card) 53'; Glavaš 67'; Pavić (yellow card) 75'; Škorić (yellow card) 78' (yellow-red card) 85'	Stadium: Stadion Poljud; Attendance: 0 Referee: Marin Vidulin (Kanfanar)

22 November 2014 16	Dinamo Zagreb	3–0 (Awarded)	Hajduk Split	Zagreb
15:00 CET (UTC+01:00)		Report		Stadium: Stadion Maksimir; Referee: Ante Vučemilović-Šimunović (Osijek)
Note: Hajduk Split players have refused to go to the ground so the match was awarded as a 3–0 forfeit win to Dinamo Zagreb.

29 November 2014 17	Hajduk Split	0–2	NK Zagreb	Split
17:00 CET (UTC+01:00)	Kouassi (yellow card) 36'; Maloča (yellow card) 50'; Sušić (yellow card) 61'; Bradarić (yellow card) 75'	Report	Kolinger (yellow card) 11'; Jurendić (yellow card) 45+2'; Krovinović 65'; Mudražija 88'	Stadium: Stadion Poljud; Attendance: 0 Referee: Igor Križarić (Čakovec)

6 December 2014 18	Hajduk Split	2–1	RNK Split	Split
17:00 CET (UTC+01:00)	Ibriks 6' (o.g.); Milić 16'	Report	Glavina (yellow card) 50'; Vojnović (yellow card) 54'; Jukić 69'; Rugašević (yellow card) 79'; Radotić (yellow card) 85'	Stadium: Stadion Poljud; Attendance: 8,000; Referee: Goran Gabrilo (Split)

13 December 2014 19	Hajduk Split	5–3	Istra 1961	Split
17:00 CET (UTC+01:00)	Caktaš 30' (pen.), 72' (pen.) (yellow card) 83'; Gotal 33', 41'; Mikanović (red card) 45+1'; Milevskyi (yellow card) 68' (goal) 88'; Z. Milić (yellow card) 80'	Report	Heister (yellow card) 18'; Radonjić (yellow card) 37' (goal) 45+1' (pen.), 51'; Jô (yellow card) 68'; Blagojević 87'	Stadium: Stadion Poljud; Attendance: 6,000; Referee: Fran Jović (Zagreb)

15 February 2015 21	Hajduk Split	2–1	Slaven Belupo	Split
17:00 CET (UTC+01:00)	Gotal 8'; Vlašić 40'	Report	Fuštar (yellow card) 42'; Vasilj (yellow card) 52'; Paracki 59'	Stadium: Stadion Poljud; Attendance: 7,000; Referee: Tihomir Pejin (Donji Miholjac)

18 February 2015 20	Rijeka	3–0	Hajduk Split	Rijeka
17:00 CET (UTC+01:00)	Jugović 2', 85'; Balaj 13'	Report	Sušić (yellow card) 65'; Maloku (yellow card) 85'; Maloča (yellow card) 89'	Stadium: Stadion Kantrida; Attendance: 7,500; Referee: Mario Zebec (Cestica)

21 February 2015 22	Lokomotiva	2–1	Hajduk Split	Zagreb
15:00 CET (UTC+01:00)	Andrijašević 6'; Leko (yellow card) 44'; Gržan 52'	Report	Maglica 26'; Milović (yellow card) 42'; Gotal (yellow card) 71'; Caktaš (yellow card) 75'; Pejić (yellow card) 77'	Stadium: Stadion Kranjčevićeva; Attendance: 3,100; Referee: Igor Križarić (Čakovec)

1 March 2015 23	Hajduk Split	2–2	Zadar	Split
17:00 CET (UTC+01:00)	Vršajević (yellow card) 17'; Caktaš (yellow card) 68'; Balić 69'; Maglica (yellow card) 73' (goal) 76'	Report	Gabrić 12'; Čirjak 17' (yellow card) 53'; Pušić (yellow card) 66'; Pešić (yellow card) 87'	Stadium: Stadion Poljud; Attendance: 7,000; Referee: Fran Jović (Zagreb)

8 March 2015 24	Osijek	0–1	Hajduk Split	Osijek
15:00 CET (UTC+01:00)	Vukobratović (yellow card) 60'; Laštro (yellow card) 64'; Mešanović (yellow card) 76'	Report	Mezga (yellow card) 22'; Balić 45+2' (yellow card) 45+2'; Maloča (yellow card) 89'	Stadium: Stadion Gradski vrt Attendance: 5,000; Referee: Domagoj Vučkov (Rijeka)

14 March 2015 25	Hajduk Split	1–1	Dinamo Zagreb	Split
15:00 CET (UTC+01:00)	Vršajević (yellow card) 17'; Mikanović (yellow card) 48'; Milevskyi (yellow card) 49'; Balić 74'; Sušić (yellow card) 85'; Maloča (yellow card) 90'	Report	Taravel (yellow card) 32'; Fiolić (yellow card) 42'; Fernandes (yellow card) 60'; Ademi (yellow card) 72'; Machado 90+4'	Stadium: Stadion Poljud; Attendance: 20,000; Referee: Ante Vučemilović-Šimunović (Osijek)

22 March 2015 26	NK Zagreb	2–0	Hajduk Split	Zagreb
15:00 CET (UTC+01:00)	Jurendić (yellow card) 30'; Muić (yellow card) 33'; Mudražija (yellow card) 64' (yellow-red card) 72'; Boban 65'; Krovinović 76'; Medić (yellow card) 78'; Stepčić (yellow card) 90'	Report	Mikanović (yellow card) 26'; Maglica (yellow card) 30'; Sušić (yellow card) 39'; Mezga (yellow card) 45'	Stadium: Stadion Kranjčevićeva; Attendance: 2,500; Referee: Ivan Bebek (Rijeka)

4 April 2015 27	Hajduk Split	1–2	RNK Split	Split
19:00 CEST (UTC+02:00)	Milevskyi 37' (yellow card) 62'; Maloča (yellow card) 39'; Vršajević (yellow card) 39'; Caktaš (yellow card) 70'; Ranilović (yellow card) 84'; Jozinović (yellow card) 90+2'	Report	Galović (yellow card) 8'; Blagojević (yellow card) 23'; Woon (yellow card) 39'; Rog 57'; Erceg (yellow card) 67'; Bagarić (yellow card) 77'; Cikalleshi 84' (pen.) (yellow card) 86'; Vidović (yellow card) 90+2'	Stadium: Stadion Poljud; Attendance: 6,000; Referee: Bruno Marić (Daruvar)

11 April 2015 28	Istra 1961	3–2	Hajduk Split	Pula
17:00 CEST (UTC+02:00)	Radonjić 51'; Jô (yellow card) 60'; Pamić 74', 89'	Report	Milović (yellow card) 23' (goal) 88'; Milevskyi (yellow card) 33'; Maglica 58'; Maloča (yellow card) 73'; Sušić (yellow card) 73'; Caktaš (yellow card) 83'; Vršajević (red card) 90'	Stadium: Stadion Aldo Drosina; Attendance: 3,000; Referee: Mario Zebec (Cestica)

18 April 2015 29	Hajduk Split	1–2	Rijeka	Split
17:00 CEST (UTC+02:00)	Gotal (yellow card) 1'; Tudor 44'; Milović (yellow card) 61'; Qurbanov (yellow card) 90+2'	Report	Tomečak 80'; Vešović 82'	Stadium: Stadion Poljud; Attendance: 6,500; Referee: Dalibor Mlakar (Zagreb)

26 April 2015 30	Slaven Belupo	0–2	Hajduk Split	Koprivnica
17:00 CEST (UTC+02:00)		Report	Mezga 17'; Grbić (yellow card) 36'; Tudor 49'; Milevskyi (yellow card) 53'; Sušić (yellow card) 60'; Maloku (yellow card) 65'	Stadium: Gradski stadion Attendance: 2,800; Referee: Bruno Marić (Daruvar)

29 April 2015 31	Hajduk Split	2–1	Lokomotiva	Split
20:00 CEST (UTC+02:00)	Mezga 11', 28'; Jozinović (yellow card) 36'; Gotal (yellow card) 84'	Report	Andrijašević 48'; Marić (yellow card) 80'	Stadium: Stadion Poljud; Attendance: 6,000; Referee: Marin Vidulin (Kanfanar)

3 May 2015 32	Zadar	2–0	Hajduk Split	Zadar
19:00 CEST (UTC+02:00)	Ikić 16' (yellow card) 90'; Krstanović 90+2'	Report	Mezga (yellow card) 67'; Milevskyi (yellow card) 90'	Stadium: Stadion Stanovi; Attendance: 3,500; Referee: Bruno Marić (Daruvar)

9 May 2015 33	Hajduk Split	3–2	Osijek	Split
19:00 CEST (UTC+02:00)	Gotal 5'; Balić 64'; Caktaš 71'	Report	Čuljak (yellow card) 14'; Bralić (yellow card) 20'; Vojnović (yellow card) 61'; Lukić (yellow card) 64'; Glavaš 67'; Špoljarić 85'	Stadium: Stadion Poljud; Attendance: 4,000; Referee: Marko Matoc (Zaprešić)

16 May 2015 34	Dinamo Zagreb	4–0	Hajduk Split	Zagreb
17:00 CEST (UTC+02:00)	Ćorić 8'; Henríquez 47', 58', 73'; Ademi (yellow card) 83'; Pinto (yellow card) 87'	Report	Sušić (yellow card) 87'	Stadium: Stadion Maksimir; Attendance: 14,372; Referee: Domagoj Vučkov (Rijeka)

23 May 2015 35	Hajduk Split	1–0	NK Zagreb	Split
17:00 CEST (UTC+02:00)	Mezga (yellow card) 18'; Vlašić 19'; Caktaš (yellow card) 70'; Maloča (yellow card) 77'; Milović (yellow card) 90+2'; Kalinić (yellow card) 90+3'	Report	Krovinović (yellow card) 27'	Stadium: Stadion Poljud; Attendance: 4,680; Referee: Tihomir Pejin (Donji Miholjac)

29 May 2015 36	RNK Split	1–1	Hajduk Split	Split
17:00 CEST (UTC+02:00)	Vidović 16'; Barbarić (yellow card) 23'; Cikalleshi (yellow card) 45'; Erceg (yellow card) 45+1'; Bagarić (red card) 90+2'	Report	Milović (yellow card) 15'; Jozinović (yellow card) 43'; Balić (yellow card) 43'; Maloku 50'	Stadium: Stadion Park Mladeži; Attendance: 2,500; Referee: Dalibor Mlakar (Zagreb)

Source: HRnogomet.com

=== Croatian Football Cup ===
24 September 2014 R1	Funtana	0–2	Hajduk Split	Funtana
15:30 CEST (UTC+02:00)	Bošnjak (yellow card) 41'; Ćamili (yellow card) 63'; Štifanić (yellow card) 81' (yellow-red card) 83'; Šegon (yellow card) 88'	Report	Gotal 9'; Maglica (yellow card) 38'; Stipica (red card) 47'; Maloča 88' (pen.)	Stadium: Stadion Funtana; Attendance: 2,000; Referee: Ivan Bebek (Rijeka)

29 October 2014 R2	Novigrad	2–3	Hajduk Split	Novigrad
14:00 CET (UTC+01:00)	Milesunić (yellow card) 22'; Tatar 30', 53'; Grbac (yellow card) 40'; Vrdoljak (yellow card) 45+1'; Valenta (yellow card) 63'	Report	Maloku 15' (yellow card) 45+2'; Bradarić (yellow card) 33'; Maglica 38', 73'; Milevskyi (yellow card) 81'	Stadium: Stadion Lako; Attendance: 2,300; Referee: Ivan Bebek (Rijeka)

11 February 2015 QF	Vinogradar	0–3	Hajduk Split	Jastrebarsko
15:00 CET (UTC+01:00)	Palčić (yellow card) 75'; Kahrimanović (yellow card) 82'	Report	Kalinić (yellow card) 20'; Kouassi 32'; Vuković (yellow card) 61'; Maglica 67', 70'	Stadium: SC Mladina; Attendance: 1,200; Referee: Tihomir Pejin (Donji Miholjac)

4 March 2015 QF	Hajduk Split	3–0 (6–0 agg.)	Vinogradar	Split
17:00 CET (UTC+01:00)	Jozinović 12'; Balić 26', 62'	Report		Stadium: Stadion Poljud; Attendance: 4,000; Referee: Željko Frković (Gospić)

8 April 2015 SF	Hajduk Split	1–1	RNK Split	Split
20:00 CEST (UTC+02:00)	Nižić (yellow card) 30'; Sušić 33'; Mezga (yellow card) 41'; Maloča (yellow card) 51'; Milevskyi (yellow card) 73'; Balić (yellow card) 85'	Report	Blagojević (yellow card) 13'; Erceg 31' (pen.); Barbarić (yellow card) 61'; Glavina (yellow card) 73'; Vidović (yellow card) 76'	Stadium: Stadion Poljud; Attendance: 6,000; Referee: Domagoj Vučkov (Rijeka)

22 April 2015 SF	RNK Split	1–0 (2–1 agg.)	Hajduk Split	Split
16:30 CEST (UTC+02:00)	Cikalleshi 44' (pen.); Bagarić (yellow card) 47'; Barbarić (yellow card) 68'; Rog (yellow card) 71'	Report	Tudor (yellow card) 57'; Jozinović (yellow card) 80'	Stadium: Stadion Park Mladeži; Attendance: 3,500; Referee: Ivan Bebek (Rijeka)

Source: HRnogomet.com

=== Europa League ===
==== Second qualifying round ====
17 July 2014 First leg	Dundalk (Republic of Ireland)	0–2	(Croatia) Hajduk Split	Dundalk, Republic of Ireland
19:45 WEST (UTC+01:00)	Shields (yellow card) 80'; Massey (yellow card) 53'	Report	Caktaš 9'; Kouassi (yellow card) 65'; Vlašić (yellow card) 56' (goal) 75'	Stadium: Oriel Park; Attendance: 3,014; Referee: Markus Hameter (Austria)

24 July 2014 Second leg	Hajduk Split (Croatia)	1–2 (3–2 agg.)	(Republic of Ireland) Dundalk	Split, Croatia
20:15 CEST (UTC+02:00)	Bencun (yellow card) 10'; Kouassi 25'; Milović (yellow card) 62'; Bradarić (yellow card) 67'	Report	Hoban 66'; Byrne 74' (yellow card) 88'; Gannon (yellow card) 77'; Towell (yellow card) 90+4'	Stadium: Stadion Poljud; Attendance: 13,890; Referee: Ionuț Avram (Romania)

==== Third qualifying round ====
31 July 2014 First leg	Shakhter Karagandy (Kazakhstan)	4–2	(Croatia) Hajduk Split	Karaganda, Kazakhstan
18:30 OMST (UTC+06:00)	Topčagić 11'; Finonchenko 21'; Kirov (yellow card) 50'; Maslo (yellow card) 56'; Đidić 71'; Bayzhanov (yellow card) 77'; Maliy (yellow card) 80'; Paryvayew (yellow card) 90+2'; Zhangylyshbai 90+4'	Report	Gotal 2'; Caktaš 78' (pen.)	Stadium: Shakhter Stadium; Attendance: 13,300; Referee: Aliyar Ağayev (Azerbaijan)

7 August 2014 Second leg	Hajduk Split (Croatia)	3–0 (5–4 agg.)	(Kazakhstan) Shakhter Karagandy	Split, Croatia
19:30 CEST (UTC+02:00)	Sušić 14'; Maglica 36' (yellow card) 90+2'; Nižić (yellow card) 72'; Gotal (yellow card) 86' (goal) 90+5'	Report	Maslo (yellow card) 47'	Stadium: Stadion Poljud; Attendance: 31,000; Referee: Tony Chapron (France)

==== Play-off round ====
20 August 2014 First leg	Dnipro Dnipropetrovsk (Ukraine)	2–1	(Croatia) Hajduk Split	Kyiv, Ukraine
19:00 EEST (UTC+03:00)	Kravchenko (yellow card) 40'; Kalinić 50'; Shakhov 88'	Report	Sušić 47'; Maglica (yellow card) 68'	Stadium: Olympic Stadium; Attendance: 10,320; Referee: Aleksei Kulbakov (Belarus)

28 August 2014 Second leg	Hajduk Split (Croatia)	0–0 (1–2 agg.)	(Ukraine) Dnipro Dnipropetrovsk	Split, Croatia
19:00 CEST (UTC+02:00)	Milović (yellow card) 34'; Vršajević (yellow card) 49'; Mezga (yellow card) 75'; Milić (yellow card) 80'	Report	Zozulya (yellow card) 73'	Stadium: Stadion Poljud; Attendance: 34,000; Referee: Hüseyin Göçek (Turkey)

Source: uefa.com

== Player seasonal records ==
Competitive matches only. Updated to games played 29 May 2015.

=== Top scorers ===
Rank	Name	League	Europe	Cup	Total
1	(Croatia) Anton Maglica	7	1	4	12
1	(Austria) Sandro Gotal	9	2	1	12
3	(Croatia) Mijo Caktaš	9	2	–	11
4	(Ivory Coast) Jean Evrard Kouassi	5	1	1	7
5	(Croatia) Andrija Balić	4	–	2	6
5	(Bosnia and Herzegovina) Tino-Sven Sušić	3	2	1	6
7	(Croatia) Nikola Vlašić	3	1	–	4
8	(Croatia) Elvir Maloku	2	–	1	3
8	(Croatia) Dejan Mezga	3	–	–	3
8	(Ukraine) Artem Milevskyi	3	–	–	3
11	(Croatia) Mario Maloča	1	–	1	2
11	(Croatia) Antonio Milić	2	–	–	2
11	(Bosnia and Herzegovina) Avdija Vršajević	2	–	–	2
11	(Croatia) Fran Tudor	2	–	–	2
15	(Croatia) Filip Bradarić	1	–	–	1
15	(Croatia) Goran Jozinović	–	–	1	1
15	(Croatia) Goran Milović	1	–	–	1
	Own goals	2	–	–	2
	TOTALS	59	9	12	80

Source: Competitive matches

=== Clean sheets ===
Number	Player	1. HNL	Europe	Cup	Total
91	(Croatia) Lovre Kalinić	8	2	3	13
25	(Croatia) Dante Stipica	0	1	1	2
13	(Croatia) Ivo Grbić	1	0	0	1
TOTALS		9	3	4	16

Source: Competitive matches

=== Disciplinary record ===
Includes all competitive matches. Players with 1 card or more included only.

Number	Position	Name	1. HNL (Note: Two yellow cards resulting in a red are counted as a total of three cards - i.e. two yellow and one red card.)		Europa League		Croatian Cup		Total	
Number	Position	Name	Booked	Sent off (straight red)	Booked	Sent off (straight red)	Booked	Sent off (straight red)	Booked	Sent off (straight red)
1	GK	(Slovenia) Marko Ranilović	1	0	0	0	0	0	1	0
2	DF	(Croatia) Dino Mikanović	3	1	0	0	0	0	3	1
4	DF	(Croatia) Antonio Milić	4	0	1	0	0	0	5	0
5	DF	(Croatia) Goran Milović	8	0	2	0	0	0	10	0
6	DF	(Bosnia and Herzegovina) Avdija Vršajević	7	1	1	0	0	0	8	1
6	FW	(Azerbaijan) Ruslan Qurbanov	1	0	0	0	0	0	1	0
8	MF	(Croatia) Mislav Anđelković	3	0	0	0	0	0	3	0
8	MF	(Croatia) Nikola Vlašić	1	0	1	0	0	0	2	0
9	FW	(Croatia) Anton Maglica	5	0	2	0	1	0	8	0
10	FW	(Ukraine) Artem Milevskyi	7	0	0	0	2	0	9	0
11	FW	(Austria) Sandro Gotal	6	0	1	0	0	0	7	0
13	GK	(Croatia) Ivo Grbić	1	0	0	0	0	0	1	0
17	DF	(Croatia) Goran Jozinović	4	0	0	0	1	0	5	0
18	MF	(Croatia) Mijo Caktaš	9	0	0	0	0	0	9	0
19	MF	(Croatia) Elvir Maloku	3	0	0	0	1	0	4	0
22	DF	(Croatia) Mario Maloča	12	0	0	0	1	0	13	0
23	DF	(Croatia) Zoran Nižić	1	0	1	0	1	0	3	0
24	DF	(Croatia) Marko Pejić	1	0	0	0	0	0	1	0
25	GK	(Croatia) Dante Stipica	1	0	0	0	0	1	1	1
26	MF	(Croatia) Josip Vuković	2	0	0	0	1	0	3	0
27	DF	(Croatia) Zvonimir Milić	1	0	0	0	0	0	1	0
28	DF	(Croatia) Filip Bradarić	5	0	1	0	1	0	7	0
30	MF	(Croatia) Josip Bašić	1	0	0	0	0	0	1	0
31	MF	(Bosnia and Herzegovina) Tino-Sven Sušić	8	0	0	0	0	0	8	0
32	MF	(Croatia) Marko Bencun	0	0	1	0	0	0	1	0
32	MF	(Croatia) Fran Tudor	0	0	0	0	1	0	1	0
77	FW	(Ivory Coast) Jean Evrard Kouassi	2	0	1	0	0	0	3	0
78	MF	(Croatia) Dejan Mezga	6	0	1	0	1	0	8	0
91	GK	(Croatia) Lovre Kalinić	1	0	0	0	1	0	2	0
99	MF	(Croatia) Andrija Balić	2	0	0	0	1	0	3	0
		TOTALS	106	2	13	0	13	1	132	3

Sources: Prva-HNL.hr, UEFA.com

=== Appearances and goals ===
Number	Position	Player	Apps	Goals	Apps	Goals	Apps	Goals	Apps	Goals
Number	Position	Player	Total		1. HNL (Note: First number represents appearances in starting eleven, while the second number indicates a substitute appearance.)		Europa League		Croatian Cup	
1	GK	(Slovenia) Marko Ranilović	3	0	2+1	0	0+0	0	0+0	0
2	DF	(Croatia) Dino Mikanović	15	0	12+1	0	1+0	0	1+0	0
3	DF	(Croatia) Petar Bosančić	1	0	1+0	0	0+0	0	0+0	0
4	DF	(Croatia) Antonio Milić	17	2	11+0	2	5+0	0	1+0	0
5	DF	(Croatia) Goran Milović	39	1	27+1	1	5+0	0	6+0	0
6	DF	(Bosnia and Herzegovina) Avdija Vršajević	31	2	22+0	2	4+0	0	5+0	0
7	FW	(Azerbaijan) Ruslan Qurbanov	7	0	1+4	0	0+0	0	0+2	0
7	MF	(Croatia) Mislav Anđelković	15	0	7+2	0	5+1	0	0+0	0
8	MF	(Croatia) Nikola Vlašić	37	4	22+5	3	4+1	1	3+2	0
9	FW	(Croatia) Anton Maglica	30	12	17+4	7	4+1	1	4+0	4
10	FW	(Ukraine) Artem Milevskyi	27	3	11+10	3	0+1	0	4+1	0
11	FW	(Austria) Sandro Gotal	34	12	22+3	9	5+1	2	2+1	1
13	GK	(Croatia) Ivo Grbić	4	0	3+0	0	0+0	0	1+0	0
14	DF	(Croatia) Ivan Anton Vasilj	7	0	4+1	0	0+1	0	0+1	0
15	FW	(Uzbekistan) Temurkhuja Abdukholiqov	2	0	0+1	0	0+0	0	0+1	0
16	MF	(Bosnia and Herzegovina) Ismar Hairlahović	1	0	0+1	0	0+0	0	0+0	0
17	DF	(Croatia) Goran Jozinović	28	1	20+3	0	2+0	0	3+0	1
18	MF	(Croatia) Mijo Caktaš	42	11	29+2	9	6+0	2	4+1	0
19	MF	(Croatia) Elvir Maloku	21	3	2+13	2	0+3	0	2+1	1
21	MF	(Croatia) Ivan Prskalo	2	0	1+1	0	0+0	0	0+0	0
22	DF	(Croatia) Mario Maloča	39	2	28+0	1	6+0	0	5+0	1
23	DF	(Croatia) Zoran Nižić	24	0	12+4	0	1+2	0	4+1	0
24	DF	(Croatia) Marko Pejić	2	0	1+1	0	0+0	0	0+0	0
24	DF	(Ghana) Jeremiah Arkorful	1	0	0+0	0	0+0	0	1+0	0
25	GK	(Croatia) Dante Stipica	6	0	2+0	0	3+0	0	1+0	0
26	MF	(Croatia) Josip Vuković	23	0	10+10	0	0+0	0	1+2	0
27	DF	(Croatia) Zvonimir Milić	2	0	1+1	0	0+0	0	0+0	0
28	MF	(Croatia) Filip Bradarić	18	1	10+3	1	2+1	0	2+0	0
30	MF	(Croatia) Josip Bašić	11	0	3+6	0	0+1	0	0+1	0
31	MF	(Bosnia and Herzegovina) Tino-Sven Sušić	33	6	25+1	3	3+0	2	4+0	1
32	FW	(Croatia) Marko Bencun	12	0	2+6	0	1+2	0	1+0	0
32	MF	(Croatia) Fran Tudor	8	2	6+1	2	0+0	0	0+1	0
77	MF	(Croatia) Josip Juranović	7	0	2+4	0	0+0	0	1+0	0
77	FW	(Ivory Coast) Jean Evrard Kouassi	24	7	15+1	5	5+1	1	2+0	1
78	MF	(Croatia) Dejan Mezga	26	3	19+2	3	1+1	0	3+0	0
91	GK	(Croatia) Lovre Kalinić	35	0	27+0	0	3+0	0	4+1	0
99	MF	(Croatia) Andrija Balić	17	6	8+6	4	0+0	0	1+2	2

Sources: Prva-HNL.hr, UEFA.com

=== Overview of statistics ===
Statistic	Overall	Prva HNL	Croatian Cup	Europa League
Most appearances	Caktaš (42)	Caktaš (31)	Milović (6)	5 players (6)
Most starts	Caktaš & Maloča (39)	Caktaš (29)	Milović (6)	Caktaš & Maloča (6)
Most substitute appearances	Maloku (17)	Maloku (13)	4 players (2)	Maloku (3)
Most minutes played	Maloča (3,510)	Caktaš (2,531)	Milović (496)	Maloča (540)
Top goalscorer	Gotal & Maglica (12)	Caktaš & Gotal (9)	Maglica (4)	Caktaš, Gotal & Sušić (2)
Most assists	Sušić (8)	Sušić (7)	–	Gotal, Kouassi & Sušić (1)
Most yellow cards	Maloča (13)	Maloča (12)	Milevskyi (2)	Maglica & Milović (2)
Most red cards	Mikanović, Stipica & Vršajević (1)	Mikanović & Vršajević (1)	Stipica (1)	–
Last updated: 6 March 2021

== Transfers ==
=== In ===
Date	Position	Player	From	Fee
26 May 2014	FW	(Austria) Sandro Gotal	Wolfsberger AC	Free
17 June 2014	FW	(Croatia) Josip Vuković	NK Dugopolje	Free
28 June 2014	FW	(Brazil) Josiel Alves de Oliveira	NK Istra 1961	Free
29 July 2014	FW	(Ukraine) Artem Milevskyi	FC Aktobe	Free
11 August 2014	MF	(Croatia) Dejan Mezga	NK Maribor	Free
31 August 2014	DF	(Austria) David Domej	SK Rapid Wien	Free
22 January 2015	GK	(Slovenia) Marko Ranilović	NK Zavrč	Free
26 January 2015	MF	(Croatia) Josip Juranović	NK Dubrava	Undisclosed

=== Out ===
Date	Position	Player	To	Fee
19 June 2014	MF	(Croatia) Franko Andrijašević	GNK Dinamo Zagreb	750,000 €
9 July 2014	MF	(Croatia) Mario Pašalić	Chelsea F.C.	2,000,000 €
11 August 2014	FW	(Brazil) Josiel Alves de Oliveira	NK Istra 1961	Free (released)
20 December 2014	FW	(Uzbekistan) Temurkhuja Abdukholiqov	TBD	Free (released)
23 December 2014	DF	(Croatia) Antonio Milić	K.V. Oostende	500,000 € (?)
22 January 2015	MF	(Croatia) Mislav Anđelković	TBD	Free (released)
3 February 2015	CM	(Croatia) Filip Bradarić	Rijeka	900,000 €
13 February 2015	FW	(Ivory Coast) Jean Evrard Kouassi	Shanghai SIPG	1,600,000 €

=== Loans in ===
Date	Position	Player	From	Until
14 August 2014	DF	(Ghana) Jeremiah Arkorful	Tema Youth	End of season
13 February 2015	FW	(Azerbaijan) Ruslan Qurbanov	Neftchi	End of season

=== Loans out ===
Date	Position	Player	To	Until
1 September 2014	DF	(Croatia) Ivan Anton Vasilj	NK Slaven Belupo	30 June 2014

Sources: nogometni-magazin.com
