= Vladislavić =

Vladislavić is a surname. Notable people with the surname include:

- Frane Vladislavić (born 1994), Croatian footballer
- Ivan Vladislavic (born 1957), South African writer
- Robert Vladislavić (born 1968), Croatian footballer

== See also ==
- Vladislav
