= Lovre Kalinić =

Croatian footballer (born 1990)

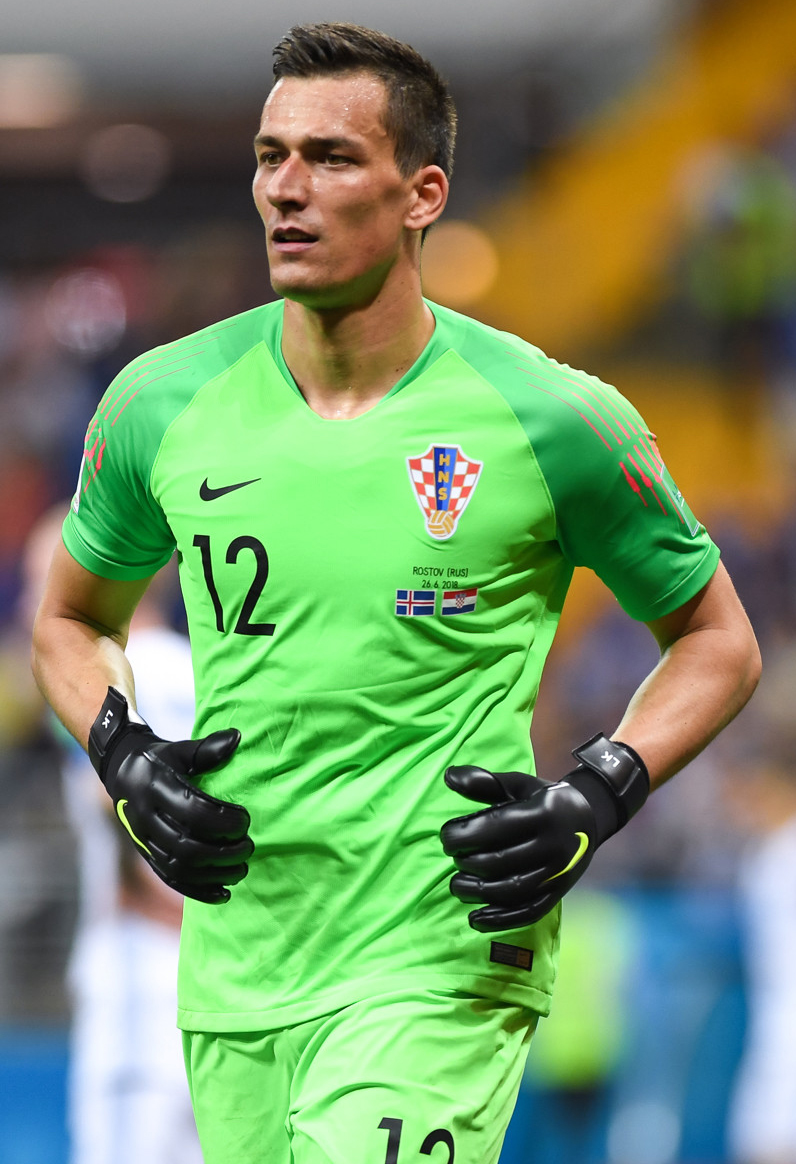
- Kalinić with Croatia at the 2018 FIFA World Cup

Personal information
- Full name: Lovre Kalinić
- Date of birth: 3 April 1990 (age 36)
- Place of birth: Split, SFR Yugoslavia
- Height: 2.01 m (6 ft 7 in)
- Position: Goalkeeper

Youth career
- 1998–2000: Solin
- 2000–2009: Hajduk Split

Senior career*
Years	Team	Apps	(Gls)
2009–2016	Hajduk Split	102	(0)
2009	→ Junak Sinj (loan)	4	(0)
2009–2010	→ Novalja (loan)	23	(0)
2012	→ Karlovac (loan)	11	(0)
2016–2018	Gent	68	(0)
2018–2022	Aston Villa	7	(0)
2020	→ Toulouse (loan)	4	(0)
2020–2022	→ Hajduk Split (loan)	50	(0)
2022–2025	Hajduk Split	14	(0)

International career
2005	Croatia U15	1	(0)
2005–2006	Croatia U16	11	(0)
2006	Croatia U17	1	(0)
2011–2013	Croatia U21	7	(0)
2014–2022	Croatia	19	(0)
Medal record
Men's football
Representing Croatia
FIFA World Cup
Runner-up	2018 Russia
- * Club domestic league appearances and goals as of 5 April 2024 (UTC)

Lovre Kalinić (Croatian pronunciation: [lǒːʋre kǎlinitɕ]; born 3 April 1990) is a Croatian professional footballer who plays as a goalkeeper.

== Club career ==
=== Hajduk Split ===
Lovre Kalinić made his HNK Hajduk Split debut on 23 April 2011, under manager Ante Miše at the age of 21, in a Prva HNL match against NK Slaven Belupo, which his side won, 2–1.

After loans to Junak Sinj in 2009, Novalja in 2010 and Karlovac in 2012, Hajduk manager Igor Tudor brought Lovre Kalinić back to Hajduk Split to be the number one goalkeeper for the 2013–14 season.

In the 2015–16 season, Kalinić set a new record for most consecutive minutes without a goal conceded in the 1. HNL. The goalkeeper went eight games, or 775 minutes, without conceding a goal. The previous record was held by Zoran Slavica, who went 711 minutes without conceding a goal in the Prva HNL.

As a result of being part of Croatia's UEFA Euro 2016 squad, Kalinić missed the first three rounds of Hajduk's 2016–17 season, being granted an extended holiday by Hajduk boss Marijan Pušnik. He made his return on 28 July 2016, where Hajduk defeated FC Oleksandriya 3–0 in the Third Round of the 2016–17 UEFA Europa League qualifying at CSC Nika Stadium, keeping a clean sheet. In September 2016, Kalinić signed a new five-year contract with Hajduk. In his time at Hajduk, Kalinić made 134 official appearances across seven seasons. In total, Kalinić spent 17 years of junior and senior football with Hajduk.

=== Gent ===
On 27 December 2016, Hajduk announced that Lovre Kalinić had played his last game for the club, with a move to Belgian First Division A side K.A.A. Gent completed. The transfer fee is the highest fee for a goalkeeper in the history of the Prva HNL. The €3.1m transfer fee will make Kalinić the most expensive player in Gent's history. He was named Best Goalkeeper in the Belgian league for the 2016–17 season, after having played only half a season upon arriving in January to Gent from Hajduk Split.

=== Aston Villa ===
On 21 December 2018, English Championship club Aston Villa announced that they had reached an agreement with Gent to sign Kalinić at the start of the January transfer window. Villa had already attempted to sign Kalinić in 2016 but were denied a work permit. He signed a contract to the end of the 2022–23 season. He officially joined on 1 January 2019 and made his debut four days later in a 3–0 defeat in a home FA Cup tie against Swansea City. His league debut came a week later in another 3–0 defeat, this time against Wigan Athletic, which was followed by a 2–2 draw with Hull City – meaning that Kalinić had conceded 8 goals in his first 3 games. He played what would prove to be his last game for the club against West Bromwich Albion on 16 February 2019.

==== Toulouse (loan) ====
On 20 January 2020, Kalinić joined Ligue 1 club Toulouse until the end of the 2019–20 season. However, he made only four appearances before the league was called off due to the COVID-19 pandemic.

==== Hajduk Split (loan) ====
On 22 December 2020, after making no appearances for Villa in the 2020–21 season up to that point, it was announced that Kalinić would go out on loan to Hajduk Split, where he started his career. The loan was scheduled to commence on 18 January 2021 – when the Croatian transfer window opened. On 22 January, he made his second debut for Hajduk in a 1–0 league victory over Šibenik.

On 11 July 2021, Aston Villa announced that Kalinić would rejoin Hajduk Split on loan for another season. Kalinić explained that Aston Villa had wanted to sell him to another club, but he was adamant that he wanted to return to Hajduk Split as he had been named club captain. Eventually, an agreement for a second season on loan was agreed by all parties.

=== Permanent return to Hajduk Split ===
On 1 July 2022, Kalinić signed for Hajduk Split once again, this time on a permanent transfer. The details were not announced by either club, but it was rumoured to have been a free transfer.

== International career ==
After Stipe Pletikosa retired from international football in 2014, Kalinić became Croatia's second choice goalkeeper behind Danijel Subašić. He made his debut for Croatia in a November 2014 friendly match against Argentina. He was part of Croatia's UEFA Euro 2016 squad.

In May 2018 he was named in Croatia's 23-man squad for the 2018 FIFA World Cup in Russia. He played the last match of the group stage against Iceland making several crucial saves. Croatia finished as the runners-up of the tournament, losing 4–2 to France in the final.

After the tournament ended, Subašić retired from international football. Kalinić has thus been appointed as the first choice goalkeeper for the national team. However, due to injuries and the consequent drop in form, he was benched again in favour of Dominik Livaković.

He was an unused substitute at the delayed UEFA Euro 2020, as Livaković played all four matches, and a year later, he remained on the standby list for the 2022 FIFA World Cup, as Ivica Ivušić and Ivo Grbić were chosen to be reserve goalkeepers.

Kalinić's last game for Croatia was a November 2019 friendly against Georgia, where he failed to save a weak shot from Giorgi Papunashvili, giving the Georgians the lead. However, Croatia turned the match into a 2–1 victory.

== Career statistics ==
=== Club ===
As of match played 30 March 2024

Appearances and goals by club, season and competition
Club	Season	League			National cup (Note: Includes Croatian Football Cup, Belgian Cup, FA Cup)		Europe		Other		Total	
Club	Season	Division	Apps	Goals	Apps	Goals	Apps	Goals	Apps	Goals	Apps	Goals
Hajduk Split	2008–09	Prva HNL	0	0	0	0	0	0	—		0	0
Hajduk Split	2009–10	Prva HNL	0	0	0	0	0	0	—		0	0
Hajduk Split	2010–11	Prva HNL	1	0	0	0	0	0	—		1	0
Hajduk Split	2011–12	Prva HNL	1	0	2	0	0	0	—		3	0
Hajduk Split	2012–13	Prva HNL	4	0	1	0	0	0	—		5	0
Hajduk Split	2013–14	Prva HNL	24	0	1	0	5 (Note: Appearances in UEFA Europa League)	0	—		30	0
Hajduk Split	2014–15	Prva HNL	28	0	5	0	3	0	—		37	0
Hajduk Split	2015–16	Prva HNL	31	0	2	0	8	0	—		41	0
Hajduk Split	2016–17	Prva HNL	13	0	1	0	4	0	—		18	0
Hajduk Split	Total		102	0	12	0	20	0	—		134	0
Junak Sinj (loan)	2008–09	Druga HNL	4	0	0	0	—		—		4	0
Novalja (loan)	2009–10	Treća HNL	23	0	0	0	—		—		23	0
Karlovac (loan)	2011–12	Prva HNL	11	0	0	0	—		—		11	0
Gent	2016–17	Belgian Pro League	19	0	0	0	4	0	—		23	0
Gent	2017–18	Belgian Pro League	35	0	2	0	1	0	—		38	0
Gent	2018–19	Belgian Pro League	14	0	1	0	3	0	—		18	0
Gent	Total		68	0	3	0	8	0	—		79	0
Aston Villa	2018–19	Championship	7	0	1	0	—		0	0	8	0
Aston Villa	2019–20	Premier League	0	0	0	0	—		—		0	0
Aston Villa	2020–21	Premier League	0	0	0	0	—		—		0	0
Aston Villa	2021–22	Premier League	0	0	0	0	—		—		0	0
Aston Villa	Total		7	0	1	0	—		—		8	0
Toulouse (loan)	2019–20	Ligue 1	4	0	0	0	—		—		4	0
Hajduk Split (loan)	2020–21	Croatian Football League	21	0	1	0	0	0	–		2	0
Hajduk Split (loan)	2021–22	Croatian Football League	16	0	2	0	2 (Note: Appearances in UEFA Europa Conference League)	0	–		20	0
Hajduk Split (loan)	Total		37	0	3	0	2	0	–		42	0
Hajduk Split	2022–23	Croatian Football League	9	0	0	0	4	0	1 (Note: Appearance in Croatian Football Super Cup)	0	14	0
Hajduk Split	2023–24	Croatian Football League	1	0	1	0	0	0	0	0	2	0
Hajduk Split	Total		10	0	1	0	4	0	1	0	16	0
Career total			266	0	20	0	34	0	1	0	311	0

=== International ===
Appearances and goals by national team and year
National team	Year	Apps	Goals
Croatia	2014	1	0
Croatia	2015	1	0
Croatia	2016	4	0
Croatia	2017	3	0
Croatia	2018	7	0
Croatia	2019	3	0
Total		19	0

== Honours ==
Hajduk Split

- Croatian Cup: 2012–13, 2021–22, 2022–23

Aston Villa

- EFL Championship play-offs: 2019

Croatia

- FIFA World Cup runner-up: 2018

Individual

- Football Oscar Best Goalkeeper in Prva HNL: 2015, 2016
- Best AA Gent-Player of the Season: 2016–17
- Belgian Professional Goalkeeper of the Season: 2016–17
- Belgian Goalkeeper of the Year: 2017, 2018

Orders

- Order of Duke Branimir: 2018
