= Ivo-Valentino Tomaš =

Croatian footballer (1993–2019)

Personal information
- Date of birth: 28 July 1993
- Place of birth: Split, Croatia
- Date of death: 31 December 2019 (aged 26)
- Place of death: Baška Voda, Croatia
- Height: 1.81 m (5 ft 11 in)
- Position: Midfielder

Youth career
- 1999–2002: Urania Baška Voda
- 2002–2005: Zmaj Makarska
- 2005–2012: Hajduk Split

Senior career*
Years	Team	Apps	(Gls)
2012–2015	Hajduk Split	7	(0)
2013–2015	→ Dugopolje (loan)	35	(7)
2015–2016	VfB Oldenburg	22	(3)
2016–2017	SSV Jeddeloh	23	(11)
2017–2018	BV Essen	1	(0)
2018	Urania Baška Voda	7	(3)
2018–2019	SV Babelsberg 03	3	(0)
2019	Urania Baška Voda	0	(0)
Total		98	(24)

International career
2009	Germany U16	3	(0)
2012	Croatia U19	1	(0)
- * Club domestic league appearances and goals

Ivo-Valentino Tomaš (28 July 1993 – 31 December 2019) was a Croatian professional footballer who played as a midfielder. A former youth international for Croatia and Germany, he died on 31 December 2019 in his home town of Baška Voda.

== Club career ==
Ivo Tomaš was born in Split, and joined Hajduk Split's youth academy in 2005. He first came under media attention when he was called up to the German U-16 national team in 2009, being eligible to play for Germany as his mother is German, not having been capped before for any Croatian selection. He was added to the Hajduk first team by coach Krasimir Balakov in January 2012. He made his debut for the first team in a 1–0 victory over Karlovac on 7 April 2012. He left Hajduk in 2015.

In the summer of 2019, Tomaš rejoined NK Urania Baška Voda for the third time.

== Death ==
On the morning of 31 December 2019, the media and his former club HNK Hajduk Split announced the death of Tomaš, by suicide.
