= Jô (footballer, born 1988) =

Brazilian footballer

Personal information
- Full name: Josiel Alves de Oliveira
- Date of birth: September 19, 1988 (age 38)
- Place of birth: Cruzeiro do Sul, Acre, Brazil
- Height: 1.70 m (5 ft 7 in)
- Positions: Winger; attacking midfielder

Team information
- Current team: Medulin 1921
- Number: 30

Youth career
- Rio Branco

Senior career*
Years	Team	Apps	(Gls)
2007–2010	Rio Branco		
2007	→ Manaus Compensão (loan)		
2008	→ Luverdense (loan)		
2010–2011	AC Juventus	20	(15)
2011–2012	→ União de Leiria (loan)	12	(0)
2012	→ Moreirense (loan)	1	(0)
2013	Caldense	0	(0)
2013	São José EC	6	(0)
2013–2014	Istra 1961	30	(3)
2014	Hajduk Split	0	(0)
2014–2015	Istra 1961	21	(2)
2015–2016	Milsami Orhei	2	(0)
2016–2017	Grindavík	9	(0)
2017	FC Anyang	16	(2)
2020	FK Jezero	4	(0)
2020–2021	Krško	3	(0)
2023	Uljanik	11	(0)
2023	Rudar Labin	11	(5)
2024	Krabi	8	(0)
2024	Rudar Labin	10	(0)
2025–	Medulin 1921	11	(3)
- * Club domestic league appearances and goals as of 4 January 2026 (UTC)

Josiel Alves de Oliveira (born 19 September 1988), or simply Jô, is a Brazilian football winger for the Croatian fifth-tier side NK Medulin 1921.

== Career ==
Playing football mostly in his native state of Acre, Josiel came to prominence during the 2011 Campeonato Acriano, playing for Atlético Clube Juventus, when he was voted the best player of the season, while also sharing the top scorer title alongside Nilton Goiano with 11 goals.

He made his move to Europe during the summer of 2011, signing a three-year contract for the Portuguese side U.D. Leiria. However, he had a falling-out with the club, and his contract was rescinded. After a spell in Brazil, playing at Atlético Clube Juventus again, he returned to Portugal, signing a contract with Moreirense F.C. He featured only 12 minutes in the first part of the season, and the contract was terminated with mutual consent, prompting another return to Brazil, where he signed for Caldense. His stay there was short and he moved on to São José Esporte Clube in February 2013.

Jô returned to Europe once more during the summer break, signing for the Croatian Prva HNL side NK Istra 1961. He scored his first goal for the club on 24 August 2013 in a home 1–0 win against Hajduk Split.
