= NK Medulin 1921 =

Croatian football club

- Full name: Nogometni klub Medulin 1921
- Founded: 1921
- Ground: Igralište Mutila
- Manager: Ivan Kukučka
- League: Treća HNL

NK Medulin 1921 is a Croatian football club based in the town of Medulin.
