= Ivo Grbić (footballer) =

Croatian footballer (born 1996)

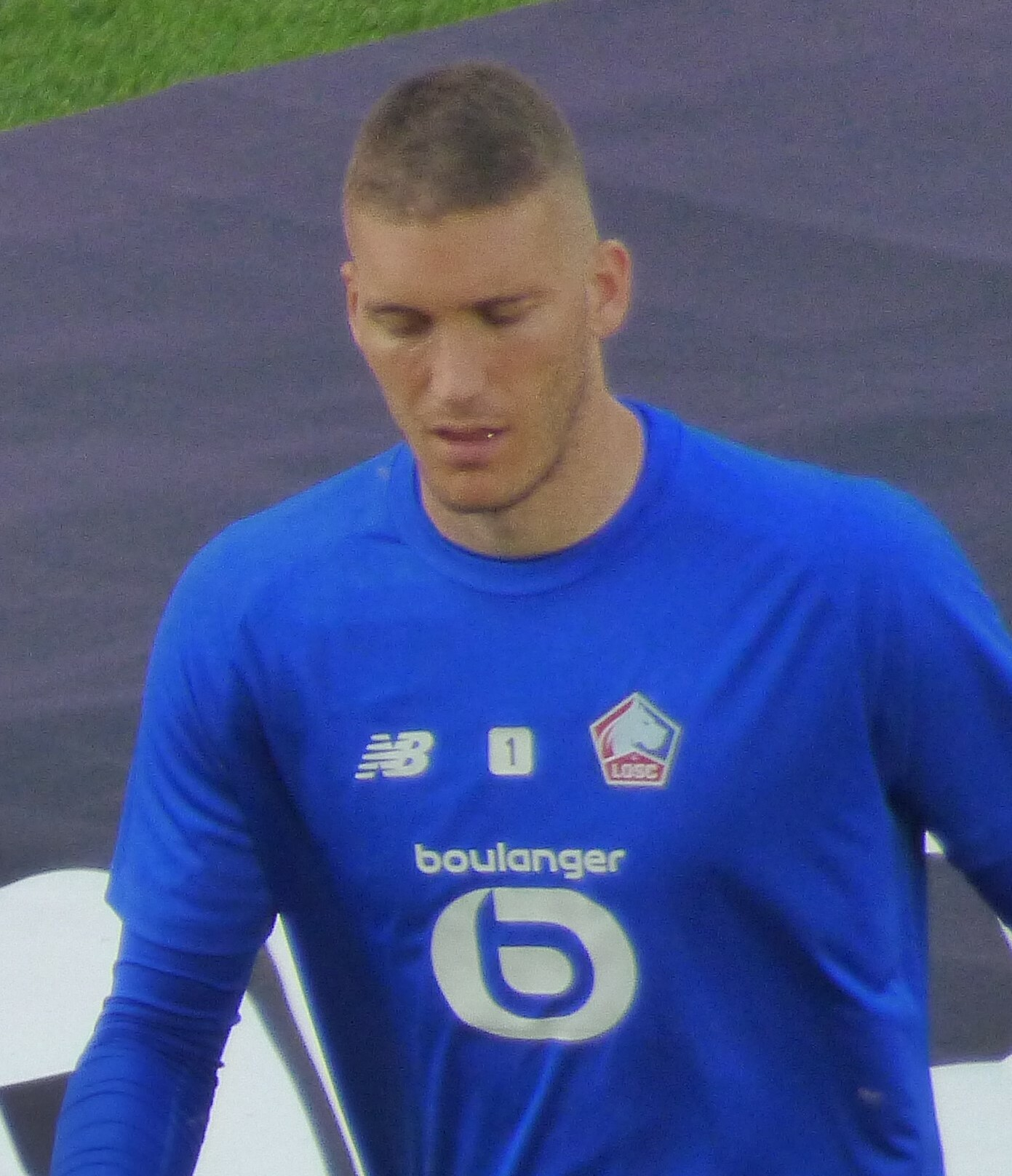
- Grbić with Lille in 2021

Personal information
- Full name: Ivo Grbić
- Date of birth: 18 January 1996 (age 30)
- Place of birth: Split, Croatia
- Height: 1.95 m (6 ft 5 in)
- Position: Goalkeeper

Team information
- Current team: Ludogorets
- Number: 13

Youth career
- 2005: Dalmatinac Split
- 2005–2014: Hajduk Split

Senior career*
| Years | Team | Apps | (Gls) |
| 2014–2017 | Hajduk Split | 7 | (0) |
| 2017–2018 | Hajduk Split II | 18 | (0) |
| 2018–2020 | Lokomotiva | 71 | (0) |
| 2020–2024 | Atlético Madrid | 12 | (0) |
| 2021–2022 | → Lille (loan) | 21 | (0) |
| 2024–2026 | Sheffield United | 9 | (0) |
| 2024–2025 | → Çaykur Rizespor (loan) | 22 | (0) |
| 2025–2026 | → Fatih Karagümrük (loan) | 32 | (0) |
| 2026– | Ludogorets | 0 | (0) |

International career
| 2010 | Croatia U14 | 1 | (0) |
| 2011 | Croatia U15 | 2 | (0) |
| 2012 | Croatia U16 | 1 | (0) |
| 2012–2013 | Croatia U17 | 4 | (0) |
| 2013–2014 | Croatia U18 | 2 | (0) |
| 2014–2015 | Croatia U19 | 8 | (0) |
| 2017–2019 | Croatia U21 | 5 | (0) |
| 2021 | Croatia | 2 | (0) |
Medal record
Men's football
Representing Croatia
FIFA World Cup
| Third place | 2022 Qatar |
- * Club domestic league appearances and goals as of 1 September 2026 Ludogorets

Ivo Grbić (Croatian pronunciation: [ǐːʋo ɡř̩bitɕ]; born 18 January 1996) is a Croatian professional footballer who plays as a goalkeeper for Bulgarian First League club Ludogorets Razgrad.

== Club career ==
=== Hajduk Split ===
Born in Split, Croatia, Grbić moved to the Hajduk Split academy aged 9, where he remained for the rest of his youth career. A youth international since the U14 level, he has drawn high praise from experts such as Vladimir Beara. At the beginning of the 2014–15 season he became the first goalkeeper of Hajduk Split II in the Treća HNL Jug. His first glimpse of first-team football was in October of the same year, when he acted as the reserve goalkeeper, but he only made his debut on 18 April 2015 in the home defeat to Rijeka, conceding two goals in the last 10 minutes of the game.

=== Lokomotiva ===
After lack of opportunities, Grbić became frustrated about his club status, thus eventually rejecting the contract extension and joining Lokomotiva in summer 2018. He made his debut for Lokomotiva on 28 July 2018 in a 4–0 victory over Inter Zaprešić. During 2019–20 season, Grbić played a key role in Lokomotiva's run as they finished second in the Prva HNL and the Cup, qualifying for the Champions League second qualifying round.

=== Atlético Madrid ===
On 20 August 2020, Grbić signed a four-year contract with Atlético Madrid in a transfer worth €3.5 million, including additional bonuses and a percentage of the next transfer. His first experience away from his homeland. He debuted on 16 December, in a Copa del Rey 3–0 victory over Cardassar. At his debut for the club, he maintained a clean sheet.

==== Loan to Lille ====
After winning the 2020–21 La Liga with Atlético, Grbić was loaned out to French champions Lille for a season to get more playing time. He made his Ligue 1 debut two days later on 21 August, in a 1–1 draw with Saint-Étienne. Grbić made his UEFA Champions League debut in a group stage match on 14 September 2021, in a goalless draw with VfL Wolfsburg.

=== Sheffield United ===
On 26 January 2024, Grbić signed for Premier League club Sheffield United for an undisclosed fee. He debuted the next day in a 5–2 defeat in the FA Cup against Brighton & Hove Albion at Bramall Lane. Upon signing, he replaced Wes Foderingham as first-choice goalkeeper. He was later dropped from this role after a series of poor performances culminating in a 4–1 loss at home to Burnley.

==== Loan to Çaykur Rizespor ====
After being relegated to third-choice goalkeeper following the arrival of Michael Cooper at the start of the 2024–25 season, Grbić joined Süper Lig club Çaykur Rizespor on a season-long loan on 9 September 2024. He made his debut on 14 September in a 5–0 away loss to Galatasaray.

On 7 August 2025, Grbić returned to Turkey to join Fatih Karagümrük on a season-long loan deal.

=== Ludogorets ===
On 1 September 2026, Grbić joined Ludogorets on a permanent transfer.

== International career ==
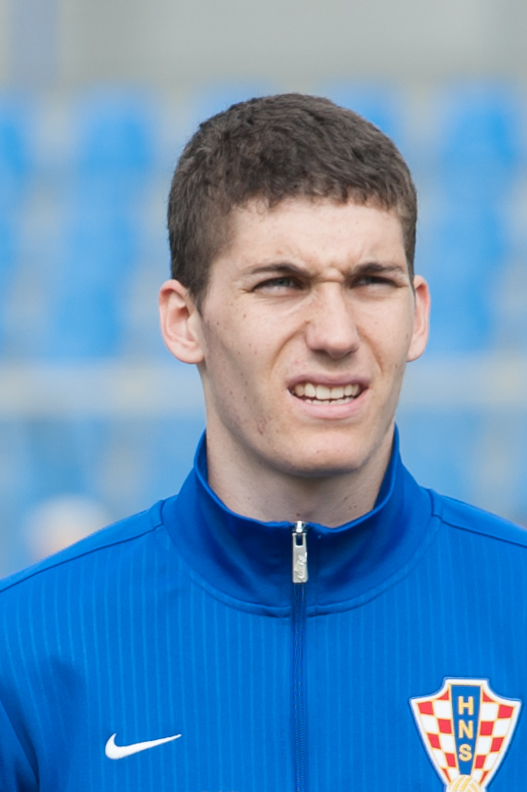
Grbić with Croatia U19 in 2015

Grbić was capped 23 times for Croatia at youth levels. He was part of Croatia's UEFA Under-21 Euro 2019 squad. He made only one appearance during the tournament, on 24 June in a 3–3 draw with England, when Croatia was already eliminated in the group stage.

Grbić received his first call-up for the senior team on 17 August 2020 for September Nations League fixtures against Portugal and France. However, Grbić did not debut until 11 November 2021, when he started in a 7–1 victory over Malta in a 2022 World Cup qualifier.

On 9 November 2022, Grbić was named in Zlatko Dalić's 26-man squad for the 2022 FIFA World Cup, where he remained an unused substitute as Croatia finished third.

== Personal life ==
Grbić has named Oliver Kahn as his idol. His father, Josip (died 2016), was the acting president of Hajduk Split during the 2010–11 season.

== Career statistics ==
=== Club ===
As of match played 13 August 2024

Appearances and goals by club, season and competition
| Club | Season | League | | | National cup (Note: Includes Croatian Cup, Copa del Rey, Coupe de France, FA Cup) | | League cup (Note: Includes EFL Cup) | | Continental | | Total | |
| Club | Season | Division | Apps | Goals | Apps | Goals | Apps | Goals | Apps | Goals | Apps | Goals |
|---|---|---|---|---|---|---|---|---|---|---|---|---|
| Hajduk Split | 2014–15 | Prva HNL | 3 | 0 | 0 | 0 | — | | 0 | 0 | 3 | 0 |
| Hajduk Split | 2015–16 | Prva HNL | 4 | 0 | 0 | 0 | — | | 0 | 0 | 4 | 0 |
| Hajduk Split | 2016–17 | Prva HNL | 0 | 0 | 1 | 0 | — | | 0 | 0 | 1 | 0 |
| Hajduk Split | Total | | 7 | 0 | 1 | 0 | 0 | 0 | 0 | 0 | 8 | 0 |
| Hajduk Split II | 2017–18 | Druga HNL | 18 | 0 | — | | — | | — | | 18 | 0 |
| Lokomotiva | 2018–19 | Prva HNL | 36 | 0 | 0 | 0 | — | | — | | 36 | 0 |
| Lokomotiva | 2019–20 | Prva HNL | 35 | 0 | 3 | 0 | — | | — | | 38 | 0 |
| Lokomotiva | Total | | 71 | 0 | 3 | 0 | 0 | 0 | 0 | 0 | 74 | 0 |
| Atlético Madrid | 2020–21 | La Liga | 0 | 0 | 1 | 0 | — | | 0 | 0 | 1 | 0 |
| Atlético Madrid | 2022–23 | La Liga | 12 | 0 | 0 | 0 | — | | 1 (Note: Appearance(s) in UEFA Champions League) | 0 | 13 | 0 |
| Atlético Madrid | 2023–24 | La Liga | 0 | 0 | 0 | 0 | — | | 0 | 0 | 0 | 0 |
| Atlético Madrid | Total | | 12 | 0 | 1 | 0 | 0 | 0 | 1 | 0 | 14 | 0 |
| Lille (loan) | 2021–22 | Ligue 1 | 21 | 0 | 2 | 0 | — | | 6 | 0 | 29 | 0 |
| Sheffield United | 2023–24 | Premier League | 9 | 0 | 1 | 0 | — | | — | | 10 | 0 |
| Sheffield United | 2024–25 | Championship | 0 | 0 | 0 | 0 | 1 | 0 | — | | 1 | 0 |
| Sheffield United | Total | | 9 | 0 | 1 | 0 | 1 | 0 | 0 | 0 | 11 | 0 |
| Career total | | | 139 | 0 | 7 | 0 | 1 | 0 | 7 | 0 | 154 | 0 |

=== International ===
As of match played 14 November 2021

Appearances and goals by national team and year
| National team | Year | Apps | Goals |
|---|---|---|---|
| Croatia | 2021 | 2 | 0 |
| Total | | 2 | 0 |

== Honours ==
Hajduk Split

- Croatian Cup runner-up: 2017–18

Lokomotiva

- Croatian Cup runner-up: 2019–20

Atletico Madrid

- La Liga: 2020–21

Croatia

- FIFA World Cup third place: 2022
