= Sandro Gotal =

Austrian footballer

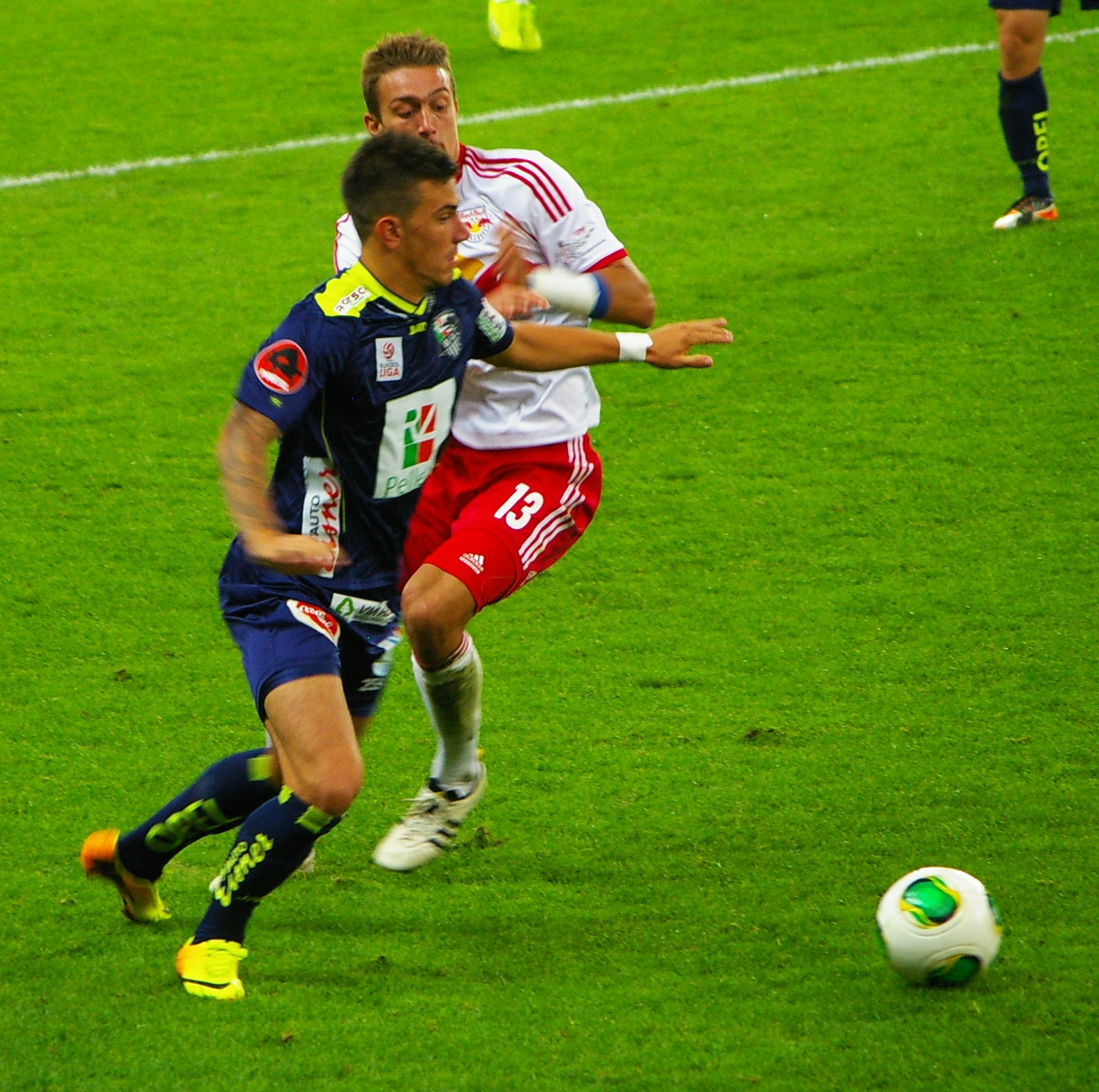
- Gotal with Wolfsberger AC vs RB Salzburg in 2013

Personal information
- Date of birth: 9 September 1991 (age 35)
- Place of birth: Bregenz, Austria
- Height: 1.85 m (6 ft 1 in)
- Position: Forward

Team information
- Current team: SV Lochau
- Number: 18

Youth career
- 2000–2008: SC Bregenz

Senior career*
Years	Team	Apps	(Gls)
2008–2009	SC Bregenz	21	(8)
2010	First Vienna	9	(0)
2010–2014	Wolfsberger AC	70	(13)
2012	→ Austria Klagenfurt (loan)	6	(2)
2012–2013	→ SV Horn (loan)	32	(10)
2014–2015	Hajduk Split	25	(9)
2015–2016	St. Gallen	7	(0)
2016	→ Yeni Malatyaspor (loan)	4	(0)
2016	Piast Gliwice	4	(1)
2017	Ashdod	4	(0)
2017	Istra 1961	7	(2)
2018	Dinamo Brest	6	(2)
2018–2019	Sūduva	21	(11)
2019–2020	Hartberg	9	(0)
2020–2021	SV Donaustauf	12	(5)
2022	SV Fortuna Regensburg		
2022	FC Montlingen		
2023–2024	SV Wenzenbach		
2024–	SV Lochau		
- * Club domestic league appearances and goals as of 9 September 2024

Sandro Gotal (born 9 September 1991) is an Austrian professional footballer who plays as a forward for SV Lochau.

== Career ==
Gotal is considered a journeyman, and has played for 15 clubs in 9 countries, including Sūduva in Lithuania, Dinamo Brest in Belarus, and Ashdod in Israel.

In September 2020, Gotal signed with fifth-tier Bayernliga Süd club SV Donaustauf after his contract had expired with Austrian club Hartberg.

== Honours ==
Wolfsberger AC

- Erste Liga: 2011–12

Dinamo Brest

- Belarusian Cup: 2017–18
- Belarusian Super Cup: 2018

Sūduva

- A Lyga: 2018
- Lithuanian Supercup: 2019
