= Nikola Sarić (footballer) =

Danish footballer (born 1991)

Personal information
- Date of birth: 6 January 1991 (age 35)
- Place of birth: Sarajevo, SR Bosnia and Herzegovina, SFR Yugoslavia
- Height: 1.83 m (6 ft 0 in)
- Position: Forward

Youth career
- Fanø Boldklub
- B 1908
- 2003–2007: Herfølge
- 2008–2009: Liverpool

Senior career*
Years	Team	Apps	(Gls)
2007–2008	Herfølge	3	(0)
2009–2011	Liverpool	0	(0)
2011–2012	Hajduk Split	4	(0)
2012–2013	HB Køge	15	(0)
2014–2016	B 1908	20	(2)
2016–2020	Kastrup		
2020–2021	Tårnby FF	12	(2)
2021–2022	AB Tårnby	18	(3)

International career
2007	Denmark U16	2	(1)
2007–2008	Denmark U17	13	(3)
2008–2009	Denmark U18	2	(0)
2009–2010	Denmark U19	3	(1)
- * Club domestic league appearances and goals

Nikola Sarić (born 6 January 1991) is a Danish former professional footballer who played as a forward.

== Club career ==
=== Fanø Boldklub ===
Sarić joined his first club Fanø Boldklub aged six while still in a Danish refugee camp, having fled Bosnia and Herzegovina during the Bosnian War.

=== Herfølge ===
Sarić joined professional club Herfølge aged 13. He spent five seasons in total with the Danish outfit, mostly in their youth system, managing to record three first team appearances in what would turn out to be his last season at the club. In 2007, Sarić was voted by the Danish Football Association to be their 2007 U-17 Player of the Year. At the age of just 14, Sarić was invited to trials at both Tottenham Hotspur and Barcelona. Both of his trials were successful, and he was offered a three-year contract at Barcelona, however he and his father rejected this opportunity as it was deemed to be "too early" in his career.

During the Summer of 2008 at only 17 years of age he was sold to Liverpool, despite reported interest from the likes of Werder Bremen, Stuttgart, Bayern Munich, Ajax, AC Milan, Inter Milan and Juventus.

=== Liverpool ===
Sarić's signing for Liverpool prompted substantial news coverage. Tottenham Hotspur, Barcelona and Charlton Athletic all attempted to sign him, resulting in a bidding war. It was reported they settled on a 3-year £500,000 contract. Liverpool Daily Post called him "one of Europe's most promising young strikers" and he was compared, in style, to Zlatan Ibrahimović However, his potential was to be unfulfilled as Sarić suffered numerous injuries during his time at the club's reserves, including two broken legs and a knee problem which stunted his development. In 2011, he was released after the expiry of his contract.

=== Hajduk Split ===
After training with the club for two weeks, he signed a contract with HNK Hajduk Split on 2 June 2011. He was released by mutual consent in 2012 after financial trouble meant the club failed to pay the player his wages.

=== HB Køge ===
On 23 March 2012 he signed a contract with the Danish Superliga club HB Køge. Injury problems continued to plague his career, however, and he managed to play only 16 games in 1 year for HB Køge in all competitions. It was announced on 5 December 2013 that Sarić would leave the club at the expiry of his contract at the end of the year.

=== B 1908 ===
On 17 February 2014, it was announced that Saric would train at former club B 1908 Amager to work on his fitness and return to the professional game. On 1 April 2014, it was announced that Saric would join the club permanently.

=== Kastrup ===
In 2016 he signed for Kastrup Boldklub in the Denmark Series.

=== AB Tårnby ===
In July 2021, Sarić joined Denmark Series club AB Tårnby. He made his competitive debut in the first round of the Danish Cup on 4 August against former club and rivals Tårnby FF. His team were knocked out after a penalty shootout. His league debut came three days later – also against Tårnby FF – where he was in the starting lineup of a 5–3 win.

Sarić declared his retirement from football in late 2022, attributing it to a lack of motivation, his commitment to his civil job, and persistent injuries as the primary reasons for stepping away from the sport.

== International career ==
He has represented Denmark at youth level in all categories. According to Bosnian media Sarić is, as of March 2010, still undecided which country he will represent, should he come into consideration at senior international level, Denmark or Bosnia and Herzegovina.

On 27 July, Sarić declined a call-up from Croatia U21.

== Personal life ==
Sarić was born in Sarajevo, present day Bosnia and Herzegovina to a Bosnian Serb father and a Bosnian Croat mother. He grew up as a refugee in Denmark after his family fled the country during the Yugoslav wars. He dated Serbian professional tennis player Ana Ivanovic in 2014.
