= James Dens =

Brazilian football agent and former player

Personal information
- Full name: James Dens Maia da Silva
- Date of birth: 14 August 1986 (age 40)
- Place of birth: Curitiba, Brazil
- Height: 1.73 m (5 ft 8 in)
- Position: Right-back

Youth career
- 1992–1998: Paraná Clube
- 1999–2002: Coritiba

Senior career*
Years	Team	Apps	(Gls)
2003–2006	Coritiba		
2007	Villa Nova		
2007	Juventude	9	(0)
2008	J. Malucelli		
2009–2010	Slavia Prague	4	(1)
2010	Aparecida	0	(0)
2010–2011	NK Zagreb	23	(2)
2011–2012	Hajduk Split	20	(0)
2012–2013	Alki Larnaca	5	(0)
2014	Rio Branco	7	(0)
- * Club domestic league appearances and goals

James Dens Maia da Silva (born 14 August 1986), known as James Dens, is a Brazilian football agent and former player who played as a right-back.

== Career ==
Born in Curitiba, James Dens passed through the youth systems of his hometown clubs Paraná Clube and Coritiba, starting his professional career at the latter. In 2007, he joined Villa Nova, only to return to the Serié A by signing for Juventude later in the year, breaking into the first team and making nine appearances. He spent 2008 in the Serié C club J. Malucelli, before moving to Europe, signing a four-year deal with Slavia Prague in February 2009. He struggled to make the first team during his year and a half there, and only made four competitive appearances throughout his time at the club. His contract was terminated in July 2010, and he returned to the lowly Aparecida Futebol Clube, but stayed there only two weeks before being recalled to Europe and signing for the Croatian side NK Zagreb. There he was a constant starter and had a good season, but refused to sign an extension of his contract, moving, in the summer of 2011, to a smaller division club Hajduk Split on a free transfer.

After stints in Croatia and Cyprus, he returned home to Brazil, to play for Rio Branco Sport Club. After several matches for the club, plagued by an injured knee, he had to undertake surgery, but was unable to return to professional football afterwards, retiring officially in July 2015. Afterwards, he started working as an agent.
