= Ivan Jovanović (footballer, born 1991) =

Croatian footballer

Personal information
- Full name: Ivan Jovanović
- Date of birth: 22 May 1991 (age 35)
- Place of birth: Split, SFR Yugoslavia
- Height: 1.90 m (6 ft 3 in)
- Position: Forward

Team information
- Current team: SOŠK Svirče

Youth career
- –2009: Hajduk Split

Senior career*
Years	Team	Apps	(Gls)
2009–2012	Hajduk Split	0	(0)
2009–2011	→ Mosor (loan)	33	(3)
2012	→ Primorac 1929 (loan)	23	(5)
2012–2013	Motor Lublin	30	(8)
2013–2015	Celje	16	(0)
2015	Zadar	1	(0)
2015–2016	Slavija Sarajevo	6	(1)
2016	Tërbuni Pukë	17	(2)
2016–2017	Legionovia	12	(1)
2017	RNK Split	16	(0)
2017–2018	Bisceglie	36	(8)
2018–2019	Lucchese	10	(0)
2019	Bisceglie	12	(0)
2019–2020	Dugopolje	9	(1)
2020	Uskok Klis		
2020	SVH Waldbach	0	(0)
2021–	SOŠK Svirče		
- * Club domestic league appearances and goals as of 15:03, 22 February 2021 (UTC)

Ivan Jovanović (born 22 May 1991) is a Croatian footballer who plays as a forward for NK SOŠK Svirče.

== Club career ==
On 21 January 2019 he re-joined Bisceglie. After spells at Dugopolje and NK Uskok Klis back in Croatia, Jovanović moved to Austrian club SVH Waldbach in the summer 2020. Due to the COVID-19 pandemic, he never played an official game for the club.

In March 2021, Jovanović joined NK SOŠK Svirče.
