= Josip Jurendić =

Croatian footballer

Personal information
- Full name: Josip Jurendić
- Date of birth: 26 April 1987 (age 39)
- Place of birth: Slavonski Brod, SR Croatia, SFR Yugoslavia
- Height: 1.80 m (5 ft 11 in)
- Positions: Right back; right winger

Team information
- Current team: Uskok

Youth career
- 2001–2005: NK Zagreb

Senior career*
Years	Team	Apps	(Gls)
2005–2015	NK Zagreb	216	(29)
2005	→ Vrapče (loan)		
2015–2016	Dukla Prague	17	(0)
2016–2017	RNK Split	24	(2)
2017–2018	NK Zagreb	10	(2)
2018–2021	Urania		
2021–2022	Hrvace		
2022-	Uskok		

International career
2004	Croatia U18	2	(0)
- * Club domestic league appearances and goals as of 20 December 2017

Josip Jurendić (born 26 April 1987) is a Croatian football defender who plays for Uskok Klis.

== Club career ==
=== NK Zagreb ===
Jurendić, Zagreb academy product, was promoted from the NK Zagreb U18 squad in spring of 2005 after signing his first professional contract and spent his first senior season on a loan at a lower league club NK Vrapče, an evolvent club for NK Zagreb. In 2006–07 season he was gradually introduced to the first team contributing to a third overall place in Championship. In 2013–14 season after being relegated a year before, Jurendić as a team captain carried out his NK Zagreb in a superb manner earning league championship title and a rapid promotion to First division. After nine wearisome seasons in unconvincing Zagreb fraught with overall problems, Jurendić went on to sign for a Czech first division side Dukla Prague where he stayed for only one season before returning to Croatia. Jurendić joined RNK Split for 2016–17 season in which club performed badly, ending relegated. After Zagreb president Dražen Medić plea to Jurendić, as a free player he decided to join his Zagreb who was now a third-tier club for the first time in an attempt to achieve a comeback promotion in 2017–18 season. However, after only 10 matches and 2 goals into the season Jurendić abruptly ended his stay with NK Zagreb due to verbal conflict of foul words with its controversial president Dražen Medić during an official league match. Long term first division player, captain with more than 230 appearances and 30 goals scored, scoring goals against Dinamo, Hajduk, Rijeka and Osijek in his career span for Zagreb left the club after confronting clash in a mid-season.

In summer 2018 Jurendić surprisingly signed for third tier-side Urania Baška Voda instead of one of the interested top level sides.
