= Joško Hajder =

Croatian footballer (1994–2022)

Personal information
- Date of birth: 15 January 1994
- Place of birth: Split, Croatia
- Date of death: August 2022 (aged 28)
- Positions: Midfielder; forward

Youth career
- –2013: Hajduk Split

Senior career*
Years	Team	Apps	(Gls)
2012–2013	Hajduk Split	1	(0)
2013	RNK Split	0	(0)
2013	→ Imotski (loan)	16	(5)
2014	Istra 1961	6	(0)
2014	Primorac 1929	15	(6)
2015–2016	Solin	35	(10)
2016–2017	Omiš	17	(4)
- * Club domestic league appearances and goals as of 4 May 2017 ‡ National team caps and goals as of 4 May 2017

Joško Hajder (15 January 1994 – August 2022) was a Croatian footballer who played as a midfielder or forward. He last played for NK Omiš.

== Club career ==
Passing through the ranks of the Hajduk Split youth academy, Hajder, an all-rounder playing mostly in the midfield and the attack, debuted for the first team in a 0–1 home loss on the 12.05.2012 to Lokomotiva Zagreb, coming in for the injured Mijo Caktaš, but never appeared again for the senior team.

After not being given a contract by Hajduk, he was signed by RNK Split and immediately sent on a loan to NK Imotski in the Treća HNL Jug. He was released during the winter period, and went on trial at NK Istra 1961, which he passed. Having impressed the coach Igor Pamić, he signed a 3.5 years contract with the Pula-based club.
