= Zvonimir Milić =

Croatian footballer (born 1995)

Personal information
- Date of birth: 20 February 1995 (age 31)
- Place of birth: Split, Croatia
- Height: 1.87 m (6 ft 1 1/2 in)
- Position: Centre-back

Team information
- Current team: Hajduk Split U-15 (Manager)

Youth career
- –2005: Orkan Dugi Rat
- 2005–2014: Hajduk Split

Senior career*
Years	Team	Apps	(Gls)
2014–2018	Hajduk Split	2	(0)
2014	→ Junak Sinj (loan)	15	(0)
2014	→ Hajduk Split B	11	(0)
2015	→ Junak Sinj (loan)	3	(0)
2016	→ Šibenik (loan)	1	(0)
2017–2018	→ Cibalia (loan)	2	(0)

International career
2009	Croatia U14	2	(0)
2010	Croatia U15	4	(0)
2011	Croatia U16	3	(0)
2011	Croatia U17	11	(1)
2012	Croatia U18	2	(0)
2012–	Croatia U19	4	(0)

Managerial career
- 2019–2020: Primorac Stobreč U-12
- 2020–2021: Hajduk Split U-19 (assistant)
- 2020–2021: Hajduk Split U-16 (assistant)
- 2021–2023: Hajduk Split U-19 (assistant)
- 2023: Hajduk Split U-16
- 2023–: Hajduk Split U-15
- * Club domestic league appearances and goals

Zvonimir Milić (born 20 February 1995) is a Croatian football coach, coaching the HNK Hajduk Split U15 team, and a retired footballer. Formerly a centre back, he last played for HNK Cibalia in Prva HNL, on loan from HNK Hajduk Split.

== Club career ==
Zvonimir Milić joined the HNK Hajduk Split academy in 2005, aged 10, after training for some time at the lower-tier NK Orkan. Progressing through the ranks, he became a regular in national selections as well, from U14 to U19, for which he debuted in April 2012, aged 17 years and 2 months. Unfortunately, a back injury halted his progress, making him lose the entire 2012/2013 season and putting into question his career. Nevertheless, he recovered and rejoined Hajduk's U19 team for the 2013/2014 season.

He made his first senior appearances in early 2014 on loan at the Treća HNL Jug side NK Junak Sinj, after he signed a professional contract with Hajduk. He rejoined Hajduk that summer and, on 24 August 2014, made his Prva HNL debut in a 0–2 loss against NK Osijek, after the coach Igor Tudor decided to rest several first-team players.

After featuring for the third-tier second team of Hajduk, another injury put him on the sidelines for the entire spring part of the season, and he was sent on loan to NK Junak Sinj again at the beginning of the 2015/16 season.
