= Dante Stipica =

Croatian footballer (born 1991)

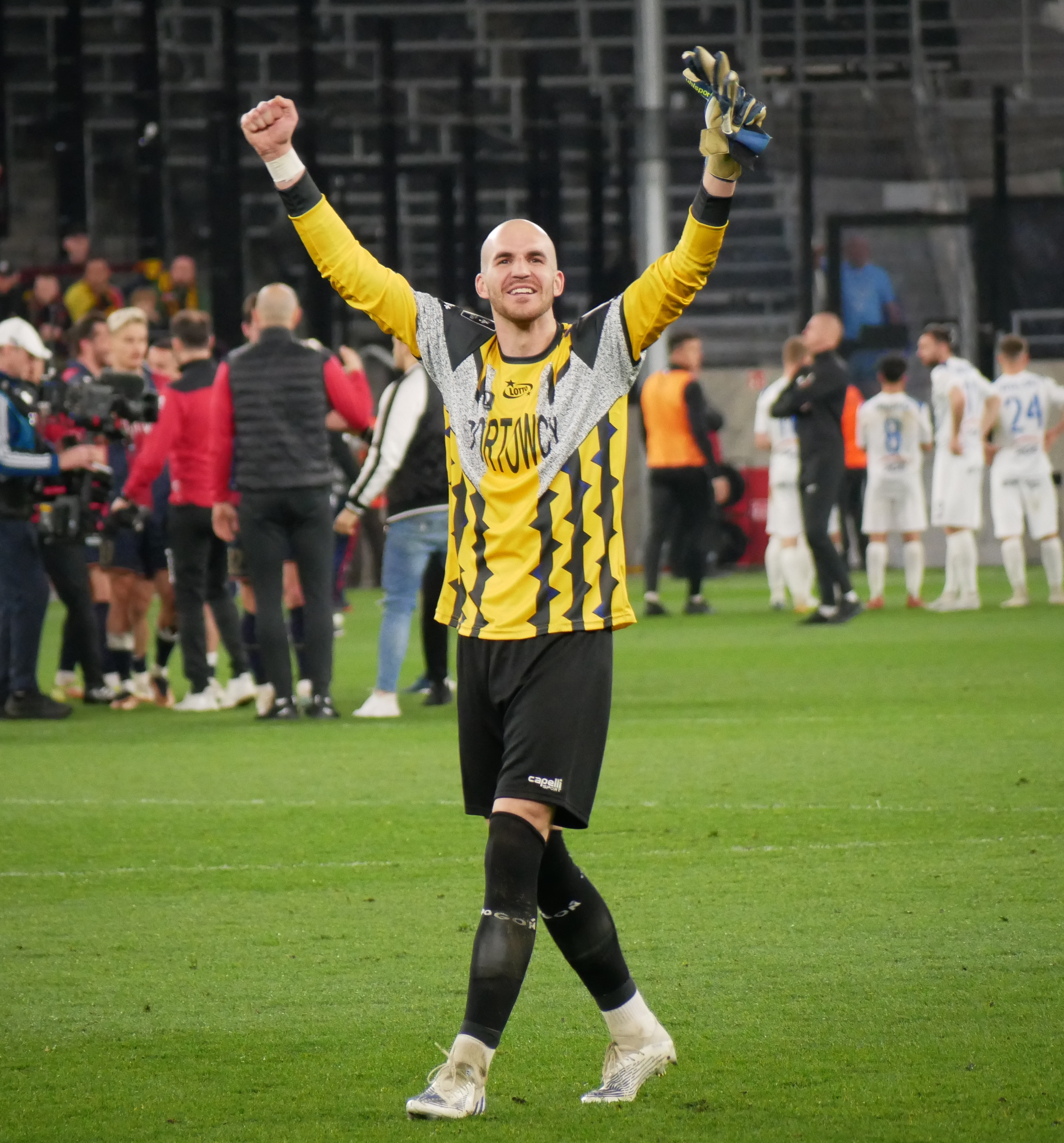
- Stipica in 2023 with Pogoń Szczecin

Personal information
- Date of birth: 30 May 1991 (age 35)
- Place of birth: Split, SR Croatia, SFR Yugoslavia
- Height: 1.89 m (6 ft 2 1/2 in)
- Position: Goalkeeper

Team information
- Current team: Hajduk Split
- Number: 44

Youth career
- 2000–2002: Dalmatinac Split
- 2002–2010: Hajduk Split

Senior career*
Years	Team	Apps	(Gls)
2009–2018	Hajduk Split	51	(0)
2009	→ GOŠK KG (loan)	14	(0)
2010	→ Solin (loan)	3	(0)
2011	→ Zmaj Makarska (loan)	14	(0)
2012–2013	→ Primorac Stobreč (loan)	27	(0)
2018–2019	CSKA Sofia	4	(0)
2019–2024	Pogoń Szczecin	133	(0)
2024	→ Ruch Chorzów (loan)	14	(0)
2024–2026	Pogoń Szczecin II	0	(0)
2026–	Hajduk Split	0	(0)

International career
2008	Croatia U17	3	(0)
2009	Croatia U18	2	(0)
2008–2010	Croatia U19	9	(0)
2010	Croatia U20	1	(0)
2011	Croatia U21	1	(0)
- * Club domestic league appearances and goals as of 15:24, 6 February 2026 (UTC)

Dante Stipica (Croatian pronunciation: [stîpitsa]; born 30 May 1991) is a Croatian professional footballer who plays as a goalkeeper for HNL club Hajduk Split. Besides Croatia, he has played in Poland and Bulgaria.

== Career ==
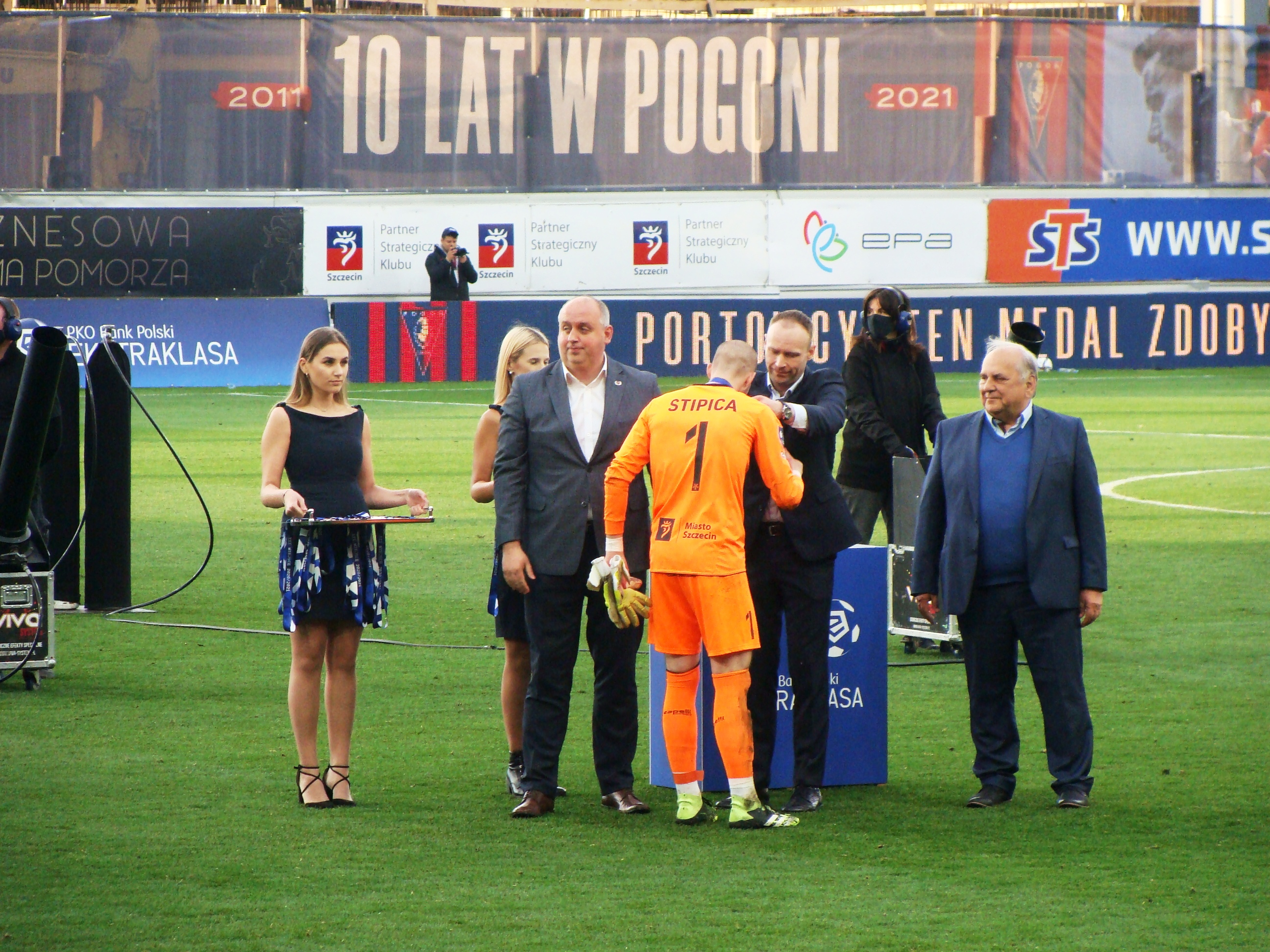
Stipica at the end of the 2020–21 Ekstraklasa season

A native of Split, Croatia, from the central Veli Varoš quarter, Stipica passed Hajduk Split's academy, gaining his first senior appearances on loan at Hajduk's third-tier feeder team at the time, GOŠK Kaštel Gomilica, at the age of 17. He made his Prva HNL debut a few weeks before his 19th birthday, in a 5–2 away win against NK Croatia Sesvete on 5 May 2010. With the likes of Danijel Subašić, Vjekoslav Tomić, Goran Blažević, and Lovre Kalinić in front of him, however, he spent the following few seasons either as third-choice goalkeeper or on loan in various second- and third-tier teams. He got more playing time in the 2013–14 season, after first-choice keeper Lovre Kalinić got injured, but was injured in turn, missing the season's end. Stipica started the 2014–15 season as first-choice keeper, but conceded his place to the recovered Kalinić after some time. He injured his right knee in October 2014, missing out on the rest of the season, which prompted the signing of Marko Ranilović at mid-season. Stipica signed with Bulgarian club CSKA Sofia in June 2018, where he saw limited action, being the second choice goalkeeper to Vytautas Černiauskas, and left the team in May 2019, after the end of the season.

== Personal life ==
Stipica studied law at the University of Split.

== Honours ==
=== Individual ===
- Ekstraklasa Goalkeeper of the Season: 2020–21
