= Marko Barišić =

Croatian footballer

Personal information
- Date of birth: 3 March 1993 (age 33)
- Place of birth: Split, Croatia
- Height: 1.80 m (5 ft 11 in)
- Position: Right back

Team information
- Current team: Libertas Novska

Youth career
- Dalmatinac Split
- 2005–2007: Omladinac Vranjic
- 2007–2012: Hajduk Split

Senior career*
Years	Team	Apps	(Gls)
2011–2013	Hajduk Split	3	(0)
2012–2013	→ Primorac 1929 (loan)	19	(1)
2013–2015	RNK Split	0	(0)
2014–2015	→ Imotski (loan)	30	(0)
2015	Primorac 1929	14	(0)
2016	Croatia Zmijavci	14	(0)
2016–2017	Dukla Banská Bystrica	5	(1)
2017–2018	Hrvatski Dragovoljac	26	(2)
2018	Val Kaštel Stari	10	(0)
2018–2019	Imotski	0	(0)
2019–2020	Jadran Smokvica	8	(0)
2020–2023	Psunj Sokol Okučani	56	(4)
2023–	Libertas Novska	5	(1)

International career
2007	Croatia U14	2	(0)
2008	Croatia U15	4	(0)
2009	Croatia U16	9	(0)
2009–2010	Croatia U17	11	(1)
- * Club domestic league appearances and goals as of 28 September 2023 (UTC)

Marko Barišić (born 3 March 1993) is a Croatian football defender, currently playing for lower league side Libertas Novska.
