= Frane Vladislavić =

Croatian football winger (born 1994)

Personal information
- Full name: Frane Kristofor Vladislavić
- Date of birth: 9 January 1994 (age 32)
- Place of birth: Melbourne, Australia
- Height: 1.79 m (5 ft 10 in)
- Positions: Right winger; right back

Youth career
- Hajduk Split

Senior career*
Years	Team	Apps	(Gls)
2012–2014	Hajduk Split	1	(0)
2012–2013	→ Primorac Stobreč (loan)	19	(3)
2013–2014	→ Dugopolje (loan)	20	(1)
2014–2015	Dugopolje	0	(0)
2015	Segesta	16	(1)
2016-2017	Junak Sinj	39	(3)
2018	Imotski	3	(0)

International career
2008	Croatia U14	2	(0)
2009	Croatia U15	2	(0)
2009–2010	Croatia U16	4	(0)
2010–2011	Croatia U17	9	(0)
- * Club domestic league appearances and goals as of 14 June 2019

Frane Vladislavić (born 9 January 1994) is a Croatian football winger, currently a free agent. Vladislavić also holds an Australian passport.

== Club career ==
A Croatian U-17 international, Vladislavić was moved in January 2012 to the Hajduk first team by coach Krasimir Balakov. Having debuted for the first team, he was sent on loan to Hajduk's feeder team NK Primorac 1929 in the summer of 2012.
