= Lovro Medić =

Croatian footballer

Personal information
- Full name: Lovro Medić
- Date of birth: 23 October 1990 (age 36)
- Place of birth: Zagreb, Croatia
- Height: 1.89 m (6 ft 2 1/2 in)
- Position: Forward

Team information
- Current team: Zagreb

Youth career
- 2001–2009: Zagreb

Senior career*
Years	Team	Apps	(Gls)
2009–2016	Zagreb	178	(31)
2016–2017	Boavista	0	(0)
2017	→ Gafanha (loan)	10	(1)
2018–	Zagreb	112	(34)
- * Club domestic league appearances and goals as of 08:08, 16 September 2024 (UTC) ‡ National team caps and goals as of 14:44, 31 December 2014 (UTC)

Lovro Medić (born 23 October 1990) is a Croatian professional footballer who plays for NK Zagreb as a forward.

== Club career ==
A product of the NK Zagreb academy, Medić made his Prva HNL debut in the 2009–10 season, starting in the 6 March 2010 1–0 away loss against NK Lokomotiva. He became a first team regular the following season, which drew controversy, and outrage from the Zagreb fans, the White Angels, as they believe that to be a case of nepotism, as Lovro is the son of the controversial NK Zagreb president, Dražen Medić, their dissatisfaction bolstered by the player's long scoring drought, broken only on 15 October 2011 when he scored the game-winning goal in the 88th minute of their 0–1 away win against NK Istra 1961. He remained, nonetheless, a fixture in the following seasons where he was one of top club scorers each of the seasons until finally On 30 June 2016, he signed for Portuguese Primeira Liga club Boavista F.C. He remained without a club between 2017 and 2018, before resigning with NK Zagreb.
