= NK Urania Baška Voda =

Croatian football club

NK Urania
- Full name: NK Urania Baška Voda
- Founded: 1922
- Ground: Športski centar Ante Jurišić, Baška Voda, Croatia
- Capacity: 2000
- League: First league of Split-Dalmatia County
colours

NK Urania Baška Voda are a football team from Baška Voda, Croatia, currently playing in the Treća HNL, the third division of Croatian football. They were founded in 1922 and named after Urania, the daughter of Zeus.

NK Urania won promotion from the 2017 1.ŽNL, the Croatian fourth division, and started the 2018 season well, standing in 6th place at the halfway mark of the season. After 6 years in the league, they were relegated to the 4th tier of Croatian football. During the 2022–23 season they were given a 1-point deduction.
