= 2011 Croatian Football Cup final =

- Event: 2010–11 Croatian Cup
| Dinamo Zagreb | Varaždin |
| 8 | 2 |

First leg
| Dinamo Zagreb | Varaždin |
| 5 | 1 |
- Date: 11 May 2011
- Venue: Stadion Maksimir, Zagreb
- Referee: Ivan Bebek (Rijeka)
- Attendance: 5,000
- Weather: Clear; 22 °C (72 °F)

Second leg
| Varaždin | Dinamo Zagreb |
| 1 | 3 |
- Date: 25 May 2011
- Venue: Stadion Varteks, Varaždin
- Referee: Domagoj Vučkov (Rijeka)
- Attendance: 3,500
- Weather: Clear

The 2011 Croatian Cup final was a two-legged affair played between Dinamo Zagreb and Varaždin. The first leg was played in Zagreb on 11 May 2011, while the second leg was played on 25 May 2011 in Varaždin.

Dinamo Zagreb won the trophy with an aggregate result of 8–2.

== Road to the final ==
| Dinamo Zagreb | | Round | Varaždin | |
|---|---|---|---|---|
| Opponent | Result | | Opponent | Result |
| Zadrugar | 6–0 | First round | BSK Bijelo Brdo | 2–0 |
| Karlovac | 2–0 | Second round | HAŠK | 1–0 |
| Osijek | 2–0 | Quarter-finals | Rijeka | 2–1 |
| Osijek | 3–1 | Quarter-finals | Rijeka | 4–2 |
| Slaven Belupo | 4–1 | Semi-finals | Cibalia | 0–1 |
| Slaven Belupo | 1–0 | Semi-finals | Cibalia | 3–0 |

== First leg ==
11 May 2011
20:10

| Dinamo Zagreb | 5–1 | Varaždin |
|---|---|---|
| Sammir 10'; Tonel 45+1'; Bećiraj 72', 79'; Badelj 80' | Report (in Croatian) | D. Škvorc 35' |

Stadion Maksimir, Zagreb
Attendance: 5,000
Referee: Ivan Bebek (Rijeka)

| Dinamo Zagreb | Varaždin |

DINAMO ZAGREB:
| GK | 30 | (Croatia) Ivan Kelava |
| DF | 3 | (Argentina) Luis Ibáñez |
| DF | 13 | (Portugal) Tonel |
| DF | 14 | (Croatia) Šime Vrsaljko |
| MF | 5 | (Argentina) Adrián Calello | (yellow card) 67' |
| MF | 10 | (Brazil) Sammir | | (substituted off) 85' |
| MF | 16 | (Croatia) Milan Badelj (c) |
| MF | 25 | (Argentina) Leandro Cufré |
| MF | 77 | (Chile) Pedro Morales | | (substituted off) 65' |
| FW | 21 | (Montenegro) Fatos Bećiraj |
| FW | 55 | (Croatia) Ante Rukavina | | (substituted off) 81' |
Substitutes:
| MF | 11 | (Croatia) Ivan Tomečak | | (substituted on) 65' |
| MF | 6 | (Croatia) Arijan Ademi | | (substituted on) 81' |
| MF | 7 | (Croatia) Josip Brezovec | | (substituted on) 85' |
Manager:
(Croatia) Marijo Tot

VARAŽDIN:
| GK | 12 | (Croatia) Denis Krklec |
| DF | 14 | (Croatia) Karlo Šimek |
| DF | 18 | (Croatia) Adam Sušac |
| DF | 19 | (Bosnia and Herzegovina) Josip Kvesić |
| DF | 25 | (Croatia) Dino Škvorc |
| MF | 5 | (Croatia) Mario Brlečić |
| MF | 16 | (Croatia) Srebrenko Posavec | (substituted off) 75' |
| MF | 20 | (Croatia) Josip Golubar |
| MF | 81 | (Croatia) Nikola Šafarić (c) |
| FW | 28 | (Croatia) Filip Škvorc |
| FW | 30 | (Croatia) Davor Vugrinec | (substituted off) 65' |
Substitutes:
| MF | 8 | (Croatia) Dejan Glavica | (substituted on) 65' |
| FW | 17 | (Croatia) Dominik Glavina | (substituted on) 75' |
Manager:
(Croatia) Samir Toplak

Assistant referees:
Željko Grgec (Bistra)
Borut Križarić (Čakovec)

Match rules

- 90 minutes.
- Seven named substitutes.
- Maximum of three substitutions.

== Second leg ==
25 May 2011
20:10

| Varaždin | 1–3 | Dinamo Zagreb |
|---|---|---|
| Šafarić 6' | Report (in Croatian) | Ibáñez 10'; Badelj 70'; Bećiraj 82' |

Stadion Varteks, Varaždin
Attendance: 3,500
Referee: Domagoj Vučkov (Rijeka)

| Varaždin | Dinamo Zagreb |

VARAŽDIN:
| GK | 12 | (Croatia) Denis Krklec | | (substituted off) 73' |
| DF | 15 | (Croatia) Nikola Tkalčić |
| DF | 19 | (Bosnia and Herzegovina) Josip Kvesić |
| DF | 25 | (Croatia) Dino Škvorc |
| MF | 5 | (Croatia) Mario Brlečić |
| MF | 6 | (Croatia) Roberto Punčec | (yellow card) 36' |
| MF | 7 | (Croatia) Adnan Aganović |
| MF | 8 | (Croatia) Dejan Glavica | | (substituted off) 61' |
| MF | 10 | (Croatia) Nikola Šafarić (c) | | (substituted off) 77' |
| FW | 17 | (Croatia) Dominik Glavina | (yellow card) 72' |
| FW | 28 | (Croatia) Filip Škvorc | (yellow card) 30' |
Substitutes:
| MF | 20 | (Croatia) Josip Golubar | | (substituted on) 61' |
| GK | 1 | (Croatia) Ante Mrmić | | (substituted on) 73' |
| MF | 43 | (Croatia) Saša Hojski | | (substituted on) 77' |
Manager:
(Croatia) Samir Toplak

DINAMO ZAGREB:
| GK | 30 | (Croatia) Ivan Kelava |
| DF | 3 | (Argentina) Luis Ibáñez |
| DF | 6 | (Croatia) Arijan Ademi | (yellow card) 66' |
| DF | 13 | (Portugal) Tonel |
| DF | 14 | (Croatia) Šime Vrsaljko | (yellow card) 34' | (substituted off) 73' |
| MF | 8 | (Croatia) Mateo Kovačić | | (substituted off) 79' |
| MF | 10 | (Brazil) Sammir |
| MF | 11 | (Croatia) Ivan Tomečak |
| MF | 15 | (Cameroon) Mathias Chago | (yellow card) 59' |
| MF | 16 | (Croatia) Milan Badelj (c) | (yellow card) 29' |
| FW | 55 | (Croatia) Ante Rukavina | | (substituted off) 57' |
Substitutes:
| FW | 21 | (Montenegro) Fatos Bećiraj | | (substituted on) 57' |
| DF | 4 | (Croatia) Leonard Mesarić | | (substituted on) 73' |
| MF | 7 | (Croatia) Josip Brezovec | | (substituted on) 79' |
Manager:
(Croatia) Marijo Tot

Assistant referees:
Damir Volf (Rijeka)
Petar Gabrilo (Split)

Match rules

- 90 minutes.
- Penalty shoot-out if scores still level; no extra time.
- Seven named substitutes.
- Maximum of three substitutions.
