= 2011–12 NK Varaždin season =

NK Varaždin
2011–12 season
- Chairman: Zlatko Horvat (until 29 February 2012); Boris Solomun (from 29 February 2012)
- Manager: Samir Toplak (until 29 August 2011); Tomica Kocijan (from 30 August 2011 until 15 October 2011); Branko Janžek (from 15 October 2011)
- Prva HNL: 16th
- Croatian Cup: Second round
- UEFA Europa League: Third qualifying round
- Top goalscorer: League: Dominik Glavina (5); All: Dominik Glavina, Davor Vugrinec (6)
Home colours	Away colours

The 2011–12 season was the 80th season in NK Varaždin (1931–2015) history and their twenty-first in the Prva HNL. Their 11th-place finish in the 2010–11 season means it was their 21st successive season playing in the Prva HNL.

This was a season of highs and lows for the club. A year earlier, in mid-2010, the club had lost its sponsor of 52 years, the Varteks clothing factory, and had changed its name from NK Varteks to NK Varaždin. The loss of their main sponsor severely impacted the club's finances. Offsetting this was their success in the first two Qualifying Rounds of the 2011–12 UEFA Europa League, being knocked out by one goal, on aggregate, in the Third Qualifying Round, played in August 2011. However, as the Prva HNL season progressed, their continued financial difficulties, including missing salary payments to its players, led to it being suspended by the Croatian Football Federation, in spring 2012, for their 23rd and 24th matches. This triggered a Federation rule that led to Varaždin being suspended from the Prva HNL for the remaining matches of the 2011–12 season. Under the rules, the club was immediately relegated to the lowest football level possible of the Croatian football league system, being the seventh-tier Third League of Varaždin County, for the 2012–13 season.

While the club was reinstated to the 3. HNL for the 2103–14 season, its continued financial woes saw the then 74-year-old organisation declare bankruptcy, and cease to exist, at the end of the 2014–15 season.

== First-team squad ==
As of 6 March 2012

Note: Flags indicate national team as defined under FIFA eligibility rules; some limited exceptions apply. Players may hold more than one non-FIFA nationality.

No.	Pos.	Nation	Player
1	GK	CRO	Ante Mrmić
2	DF	CRO	Ante Režić
3	DF	CRO	Matija Katanec
4	DF	CRO	Antonio Mamić
5	MF	CRO	Luka Jagačić
6	MF	CRO	Gordan Golik
7	FW	CRO	Matias Zubak
8	MF	SLO	Dejan Komljenović
9	FW	CRO	Mario Sačer
10	MF	CRO	Dominik Glavina
11	FW	CRO	Marko Trojak
12	GK	CRO	Marko Sušac
13	MF	CRO	Kenan Karađuz
15	DF	CRO	Danijel Rašić

No.	Pos.	Nation	Player
16	MF	CRO	Jurica Grgec
17	MF	CRO	Marko Pajač
18	FW	CRO	Ivan Antolek
19	FW	CRO	Niko Tokić
20	DF	CRO	Mirko Plantić
21	GK	CRO	Dean Šafarić
23	DF	CRO	Ante Aračić
25	DF	CRO	Filip Kurtović
26	DF	CRO	Mario Lončar
27	DF	CRO	Ivan Conjar
28	MF	CRO	Leon Kukec
29	MF	CRO	Domagoj Kuran
30	DF	CRO	Denis Glavina

== Competitions ==
=== Overall ===
Competition	Started round	Final result	First match	Last Match
2011–12 Prva HNL	–	16th	24 July	31 March
2011–12 Croatian Cup	First round	Second round	20 September	25 October
2011–12 UEFA Europa League	QR1	QR3	30 June	4 August

=== Prva HNL ===
==== Classification ====
Pos	Team	Pld	W	D	L	GF	GA	GD	Pts	Qualification or relegation
12	Rijeka	30	9	11	10	29	29	0	38	
13	Lučko (R)	30	6	13	11	29	36	−7	31	Relegation to Croatian Second Football League
14	Šibenik (R)	30	6	9	15	27	39	−12	27	Relegation to Croatian Second Football League
15	Karlovac (Note: Karlovac were deducted 1 point after they failed to appear on the match against Rijeka) (R)	30	6	7	17	25	53	−28	24	Relegation to Croatian Second Football League
16	Varaždin (Note: Varaždin were deducted 1 point after they failed to play the match against Rijeka due to suspension) (D, R)	24	2	3	19	16	52	−36	8	Relegation to Croatian Second Football League (Note: After Varaždin failed to play two matches due to suspension, according to the competition rulebook they were considered to have withdrawn from the competition and since they have played more than a half of matches in the second part of the season, those matches were considered valid and all further matches were awarded as 3–0 forfeit wins to their opponents. Also according to the rulebook, since Varaždin left the competition after the 24th round, the number of matches they have played will stay at 24 in the league table.)

Source: Sportnet.hr
Rules for classification: 1) points; 2) goal difference; 3) number of goals scored.
For deciding champions, qualification to UEFA Europa League and relegation: 1st points; 2nd head-to-head points; 3rd head-to-head goal difference; 4th head-to-head away goals scored
(D) Disqualified; (R) Relegated

==== Results summary ====
Overall								Home						Away					
Pld	W	D	L	GF	GA	GD	Pts	W	D	L	GF	GA	GD	W	D	L	GF	GA	GD
30	2	3	25	16	70	−54	9	2	1	12	11	34	−23	0	2	13	5	36	−31

Last updated: 12 May 2012.
Source: Sportnet.hr

==== Results by round ====
Round	1	2	3	4	5	6	7	8	9	10	11	12	13	14	15	16	17	18	19	20	21	22	23	24	25	26	27	28	29	30
Ground	H	A	H	A	H	A	H	A	H	A	H	A	H	A	H	A	H	A	H	A	H	A	H	A	H	A	H	A	H	A
Result	L	L	L	L	D	L	L	L	L	L	L	D	L	L	W	L	W	L	L	L	L	D	L	L	L	L	L	L	L	L
Position	16	16	16	16	16	16	16	16	16	16	16	16	16	16	16	16	16	16	16	16	16	16	16	16	16	16	16	16	16	16

Updated to match(es) played on 12 May 2012. Source: Competitive matches
A = Away; H = Home; W = Win; D = Draw; L = Loss
Notes: Round 18 was played between rounds 22 and 23, on 20–21 March 2012

== Matches ==
=== Pre-season ===
Match	Date	Venue	Opponent	Score	Attendance	Varaždin Scorers	Report
1	17 Jun	A	Strmec Bedenica	3–1		Hojski (2), Vuk	Sportnet.hr
2	18 Jun	H	Zorya Luhansk (Ukraine)	2–2		Vugrinec, Šafarić	Sportnet.hr
3	22 Jun	A	Lučko	3–0	300	Šafarić, Brlečić, F. Škvorc	Sportnet.hr
4	25 Jun	H	Karlovac	4–1		Vugrinec (2), Glavica, F. Škvorc	Sportnet.hr
5	3 Jul	H	Śląsk Wrocław (Poland)	0–1			Sportnet.hr
6	17 Jul	H	Middlesbrough (England)	2–3	2,000	Vugrinec, Trojak	Sportnet.hr

=== Prva HNL ===
Round	Date	Venue	Opponent	Score	Attendance	Varaždin Scorers	Report
1	24 Jul	H	Lokomotiva	0–2	975		Sportnet.hr
2	31 Jul	A	Šibenik	0–1	2,000		Sportnet.hr
3	7 Aug	H	Zadar	1–2	517	Vugrinec	Sportnet.hr
4	13 Aug	A	Rijeka	0–2	3,000		Sportnet.hr
5	20 Aug	H	Istra 1961	2–2	514	Golubar, Do. Glavina	Sportnet.hr
6	26 Aug	A	NK Zagreb	0–1	500		Sportnet.hr
7	10 Sep	H	RNK Split	1–2	1,000	Tokić	Sportnet.hr
8	17 Sep	A	Dinamo Zagreb	0–7	5,500		Sportnet.hr
9	24 Sep	H	Cibalia	0–1	486		Sportnet.hr
10	1 Oct	A	Slaven Belupo	0–1	1257		Sportnet.hr
11	15 Oct	H	Karlovac	0–1	312		Sportnet.hr
12	22 Oct	A	Osijek	2–2	500	Golubar, Antolek	Sportnet.hr
13	29 Oct	H	Lučko	0–2	500		Sportnet.hr
14	5 Nov	A	Hajduk Split	0–3	5,000		Sportnet.hr
15	19 Nov	H	Inter Zaprešić	3–2	300	Tokić, Golubar, Do. Glavina	Sportnet.hr
16	25 Nov	A	Lokomotiva	0–1	110		Sportnet.hr
17	3 Dec	H	Šibenik	2–1	500	Vugrinec, Sačer	Sportnet.hr
19	24 Feb	H	Rijeka	0 – 3^{*}	–		Sportnet.hr
20	3 Mar	A	Istra 1961	1–2	1,200	Do. Glavina	Sportnet.hr
21	10 Mar	H	NK Zagreb	2–3	500	Do. Glavina, Brlenić	Sportnet.hr
22	17 Mar	A	RNK Split	2–2	400	Do. Glavina, Antolek	Sportnet.hr
18	21 Mar	A	Zadar	0–2	1,000		Sportnet.hr
23	24 Mar	H	Dinamo Zagreb	0–4	2,500		Sportnet.hr
24	31 Mar	A	Cibalia	0 – 3^{*}	–		
25	7 Apr	H	Slaven Belupo	0 – 3^{†}	–		
26	14 Apr	A	Karlovac	0 – 3^{†}	–		
27	21 Apr	H	Osijek	0 – 3^{†}	–		
28	28 Apr	A	Lučko	0 – 3^{†}	–		
29	5 May	H	Hajduk Split	0 – 3^{†}	–		
30	12 May	A	Inter Zaprešić	0 – 3^{†}	–		

^{*} Varaždin was suspended and thus unable to play the match so the game was awarded 3–0

^{†} After failing to play two matches in Prva HNL, Varaždin was expelled and all their remaining matches were awarded as a 3–0 forfeit win to opponents

=== Europa League ===
Round	Date	Venue	Opponent	Score	Attendance	Varaždin Scorers	Report
QR1	30 Jun	H	Lusitanos (Andorra)	5–1	2,000	Šafarić (2), Glavica, Do. Glavina, Vugrinec	Sportnet.hr
QR1	7 Jul	A (Andorra)	Lusitanos (Andorra)	1–0	400	Brlečić	Sportnet.hr
QR2	14 Jul	A (Moldova)	Iskra-Stal (Moldova)	1–1	1,000	Tkalčić	Sportnet.hr
QR2	21 Jul	H	Iskra-Stal (Moldova)	3–1	3,000	Vugrinec (2), Glavica	Sportnet.hr
QR3	28 Jul	A (Romania)	Dinamo București (Romania)	2–2	4,000	Sačer, Vugrinec	Sportnet.hr
QR3	4 Aug	H	Dinamo București (Romania)	1–2	4,793	Golubar	Sportnet.hr

=== Croatian Cup ===
Round	Date	Venue	Opponent	Score	Attendance	Varaždin Scorers	Report
R1	20 Sep	A	Podravac Virje	0–0 (4–2 p)	300		Sportnet.hr
R2	25 Oct	H	Istra 1961	0–1 (a.e.t.)	500		Sportnet.hr

== Player seasonal records ==
Competitive matches only. Updated to games played 24 March 2012.

=== Top scorers ===
Rank	Name	League	Europe	Cup	Total
1	(Croatia) Dominik Glavina	5	1	–	6
1	(Croatia) Davor Vugrinec	2	4	–	6
3	(Croatia) Josip Golubar	3	1	–	4
4	(Croatia) Ivan Antolek	2	–	–	2
4	(Croatia) Dejan Glavica	–	2	–	2
4	(Croatia) Mario Sačer	1	1	–	2
4	(Croatia) Nikola Šafarić	–	2	–	2
4	(Croatia) Niko Tokić	2	–	–	2
9	(Croatia) Luka Brlenić	1	–	–	1
9	(Croatia) Mario Brlečić	–	1	–	1
9	(Croatia) Nikola Tkalčić	–	1	–	1
	TOTALS	16	13	–	29

Source: Competitive matches

=== Disciplinary record ===
Includes all competitive matches. Players with 1 card or more included only.

Number	Position	Name	1. HNL		Europa League		Croatian Cup		Total	
Number	Position	Name	Yellow card	Red card	Yellow card	Red card	Yellow card	Red card	Yellow card	Red card
2	DF	(Brazil) Jhonnes	2	0	0	0	0	0	2	0
4	MF	(Croatia) Goran Barišić	1	1	0	0	0	0	1	1
5	MF	(Croatia) Luka Jagačić	2	0	0	0	0	0	2	0
5	MF	(Croatia) Mario Brlečić	0	0	2	0	0	0	2	0
6	DF	(Croatia) Gordan Golik	2	0	0	0	0	0	2	0
8	FW	(Croatia) Danko Cerovečki	1	0	0	0	0	0	1	0
9	FW	(Croatia) Mario Sačer	5	1	1	0	1	0	7	1
10	FW	(Croatia) Dominik Glavina	1	0	1	0	0	0	2	0
10	MF	(Croatia) Nikola Šafarić	0	0	0	1	0	0	0	1
12	GK	(Croatia) Denis Krklec	1	0	0	0	0	0	1	0
13	MF	(Croatia) Marko Pajač	0	0	0	1	0	0	0	1
14	DF	(Croatia) Karlo Šimek	5	0	1	0	0	0	6	0
15	MF	(Croatia) Danijel Rašić	3	0	0	0	1	0	4	0
15	DF	(Croatia) Nikola Tkalčić	1	0	0	0	0	0	1	0
16	MF	(Croatia) Jurica Grgec	4	0	0	0	0	0	4	0
18	DF	(Croatia) Adam Sušac	2	0	1	0	0	0	3	0
20	MF	(Croatia) Josip Golubar	1	0	0	0	0	1	1	1
21	GK	(Croatia) Saša Dreven	1	0	0	0	0	0	1	0
26	MF	(Croatia) Mario Lončar	4	0	0	0	1	0	5	0
27	DF	(Croatia) Ivan Conjar	4	0	3	0	1	0	8	0
30	DF	(Croatia) Denis Glavina	1	0	0	0	0	0	1	0
30	FW	(Croatia) Davor Vugrinec	1	0	0	0	0	0	1	0
		TOTALS	42	2	9	2	4	1	55	5

Sources: Prva-HNL.hr, UEFA.com

=== Appearances and goals ===
Number	Position	Player	Apps	Goals	Apps	Goals	Apps	Goals	Apps	Goals
Number	Position	Player	Total		1. HNL		Europa League		Croatian Cup	
1	GK	(Croatia) Ante Mrmić	5	0	4+0	0	0+1	0	0+0	0
2	DF	(Brazil) Jhonnes	9	0	8+0	0	0+0	0	1+0	0
3	DF	(Croatia) Matija Katanec	2	0	2+0	0	0+0	0	0+0	0
4	DF	(Croatia) Antonio Mamić	1	0	1+0	0	0+0	0	0+0	0
4	MF	(Croatia) Goran Barišić	8	0	7+0	0	0+0	0	1+0	0
5	MF	(Croatia) Luka Jagačić	5	0	5+0	0	0+0	0	0+0	0
5	MF	(Croatia) Mario Brlečić	8	1	3+0	0	5+0	1	0+0	0
6	DF	(Croatia) Gordan Golik	9	0	9+0	0	0+0	0	0+0	0
6	MF	(Croatia) Roberto Punčec	3	0	1+0	0	2+0	0	0+0	0
7	FW	(Croatia) Matias Zubak	2	0	2+0	0	0+0	0	0+0	0
7	MF	(Croatia) Adnan Aganović	8	0	3+0	0	4+1	0	0+0	0
8	FW	(Croatia) Danko Cerovečki	17	0	5+10	0	0+0	0	1+1	0
8	MF	(Croatia) Luka Brlenić	3	1	0+3	1	0+0	0	0+0	0
8	MF	(Croatia) Dejan Glavica	6	2	2+0	0	4+0	2	0+0	0
9	FW	(Croatia) Mario Sačer	25	2	14+6	1	4+0	1	1+0	0
10	FW	(Croatia) Dominik Glavina	28	6	18+2	5	6+0	1	2+0	0
10	MF	(Croatia) Nikola Šafarić	6	2	3+0	0	3+0	2	0+0	0
11	MF	(Croatia) Marko Trojak	8	0	3+3	0	0+2	0	0+0	0
12	GK	(Croatia) Marko Sušac	1	0	1+0	0	0+0	0	0+0	0
12	GK	(Croatia) Denis Krklec	13	0	7+0	0	6+0	0	0+0	0
13	MF	(Croatia) Marko Pajač	12	0	4+6	0	0+1	0	0+1	0
14	DF	(Croatia) Karlo Šimek	23	0	15+0	0	6+0	0	2+0	0
15	MF	(Croatia) Danijel Rašić	16	0	13+2	0	0+0	0	1+0	0
15	DF	(Croatia) Nikola Tkalčić	9	1	3+0	0	6+0	1	0+0	0
16	MF	(Croatia) Jurica Grgec	20	0	11+2	0	1+4	0	2+0	0
18	FW	(Croatia) Ivan Antolek	10	2	3+6	2	0+0	0	0+1	0
18	DF	(Croatia) Adam Sušac	10	0	3+2	0	4+0	0	1+0	0
19	FW	(Croatia) Niko Tokić	17	2	10+5	2	0+0	0	1+1	0
20	MF	(Croatia) Mirko Plantić	2	0	0+2	0	0+0	0	0+0	0
20	MF	(Croatia) Josip Golubar	19	4	13+0	3	2+2	1	2+0	0
21	GK	(Croatia) Dean Šafarić	1	0	1+0	0	0+0	0	0+0	0
21	GK	(Croatia) Saša Dreven	11	0	9+0	0	0+0	0	2+0	0
23	DF	(Croatia) Ante Aračić	4	0	4+0	0	0+0	0	0+0	0
23	DF	(Croatia) Nikola Antolić	6	0	2+1	0	0+2	0	0+1	0
25	FW	(Croatia) Denis Kaniški	3	0	0+3	0	0+0	0	0+0	0
26	MF	(Croatia) Mario Lončar	18	0	12+4	0	0+1	0	1+0	0
27	DF	(Croatia) Ivan Conjar	27	0	17+3	0	5+0	0	2+0	0
29	DF	(Croatia) Alen Gluhak	12	0	6+1	0	2+2	0	1+0	0
30	DF	(Croatia) Denis Glavina	3	0	3+0	0	0+0	0	0+0	0
30	FW	(Croatia) Davor Vugrinec	22	6	14+2	2	5+0	4	1+0	0
N/A	MF	(Slovenia) Dejan Komljenović	1	0	1+0	0	0+0	0	0+0	0

Sources: Prva-HNL.hr, UEFA.com
