= 2011–12 in Croatian football =

First Division champions
- Dinamo Zagreb (14th title)

Second Division champions
- Dugopolje

Third Division champions
- BSK Bijelo Brdo (East); Zelina (West); Mladost Ždralovi (North); Raštane (South)

Croatian Cup winners
- Dinamo Zagreb (12th title)

Teams in Europe
- Dinamo Zagreb, Hajduk Split, RNK Split, Varaždin

Croatia national team
- UEFA Euro 2012 qualifying

The following article presents a summary of the 2011–12 football season in Croatia, which was the 21st season of competitive football in the country.

== National teams ==
=== Croatia ===
Date	Venue	Opponents	Score	Croatia scorer(s)	Report
Friendly matches
10 August 2011	Aviva Stadium, Dublin (A)	Republic of Ireland	0–0		HNS-CFF.hr
UEFA Euro 2012 qualifying – Group stage
3 June 2011	Poljud Stadium, Split (H)	Georgia	2–1	Mandžukić, Kalinić	UEFA.com
2 September 2011	Ta' Qali Stadium, Ta' Qali (A)	Malta	3–1	Vukojević, Badelj, Lovren	UEFA.com
6 September 2011	Maksimir Stadium, Zagreb (H)	Israel	3–1	Modrić, Eduardo (2)	UEFA.com
7 October 2011	Karaiskakis Stadium, Piraeus (A)	Greece	0–2		UEFA.com
11 October 2011	Kantrida Stadium, Rijeka (H)	Latvia	2–0	Eduardo, Mandžukić	UEFA.com
UEFA Euro 2012 qualifying play-offs
11 November 2011	Türk Telekom Arena, Istanbul (A)	Turkey	3–0	Olić, Mandžukić, Ćorluka	UEFA.com
15 November 2011	Maksimir Stadium, Zagreb (H)	Turkey	0–0		

=== Croatia U21 ===
Date	Venue	Opponents	Score	Croatia scorer(s)	Report
2013 UEFA European Under-21 Football Championship qualification – Group stage
3 June 2011	Hrvatski vitezovi, Dugopolje (H)	Georgia	0–1		UEFA.com
5 September 2011	Stade Tourbillon, Sion (A)	Switzerland	0–4		UEFA.com
6 October 2011	Stadion Gradski vrt, Osijek (H)	Spain	0–2		UEFA.com
10 October 2011	Tamme Stadium, Tartu (A)	Estonia	1–0	Vukušić	UEFA.com
14 November 2011	Stadion Aldo Drosina, Pula (H)	Estonia	4–0	Čop, Vukušić (2); Ademi	UEFA.com

=== Croatia U20 ===
Date	Venue	Opponents	Score	Croatia scorer(s)	Report
2011 FIFA U-20 World Cup
31 July 2011	Estadio Centenario, Armenia	Saudi Arabia	0–2		FIFA.com
3 August 2011	Estadio Centenario, Armenia	Nigeria	2–5	Lendrić, Kramarić	FIFA.com
6 August 2011	Estadio Centenario, Armenia	Guatemala	0–1		FIFA.com

=== Croatia U19 ===
Date	Venue	Opponents	Score	Croatia scorer(s)	Report
2012 UEFA European Under-19 Football Championship qualifying round
10 November 2011	De Bataven, Gendt (A)	Finland	4–2	Livaja (2), Rebić, Miškić	UEFA.com
12 November 2011	VIOD, Doetinchem (A)	Moldova	4–0	Jelavić (3), Čolak	UEFA.com
15 November 2011	De Bataven, Gendt (A)	Netherlands	0–0		

=== Croatia U17 ===
Date	Venue	Opponents	Score	Croatia scorer(s)	Report
2012 UEFA European Under-17 Football Championship qualifying round
25 October 2011	Stadion Valbruna, Rovinj (H)	Azerbaijan	1–2	Pjaca	UEFA.com
27 October 2011	Stadion Veli Jože, Poreč (H)	Ukraine	1–0	Pašalić	UEFA.com
30 October 2011	Gradski stadion Laco, Novigrad (H)	Belgium	3–4	Mandić, Faletar, Kolar	UEFA.com

== League tables ==
=== Prva HNL ===
Pos	Team	Pld	W	D	L	GF	GA	GD	Pts	Qualification or relegation
1	Dinamo Zagreb (C)	30	23	6	1	73	11	+62	75	Qualification to Champions League second qualifying round
2	Hajduk Split	30	16	6	8	50	24	+26	54	Qualification to Europa League second qualifying round (Note: Since 2011–12 Croatian Cup winners Dinamo Zagreb qualified for the 2012–13 UEFA Champions League, so cup runners-up Osijek qualified for the 2012–13 UEFA Europa League first qualifying round. Moreover, Slaven Belupo were moved up a round as the cup winner spot was not used.)
3	Slaven Belupo	30	14	10	6	41	27	+14	52	Qualification to Europa League second qualifying round
4	RNK Split	30	14	8	8	43	32	+11	50	
5	Cibalia	30	13	6	11	35	35	0	45	
6	NK Zagreb	30	13	6	11	36	42	−6	45	
7	Lokomotiva	30	12	8	10	33	33	0	44	
8	Osijek	30	11	10	9	45	38	+7	43	Qualification to Europa League first qualifying round
9	Istra 1961	30	11	9	10	35	33	+2	42	
10	Zadar	30	11	7	12	29	44	−15	40	
11	Inter Zaprešić	30	11	5	14	33	33	0	38	
12	Rijeka	30	9	11	10	29	29	0	38	
13	Lučko (R)	30	6	13	11	29	36	−7	31	Relegation to Croatian Second Football League
14	Šibenik (R)	30	6	9	15	27	39	−12	27	Relegation to Croatian Second Football League
15	Karlovac (Note: Karlovac were deducted 1 point after they failed to appear on the match against Rijeka) (R)	30	6	7	17	25	53	−28	24	Relegation to Croatian Second Football League
16	Varaždin (Note: Varaždin were deducted 1 point after they failed to play the match against Rijeka due to suspension) (D, R)	24	2	3	19	16	52	−36	8	Relegation to Croatian Second Football League (Note: After Varaždin failed to play two matches due to suspension, according to the competition rulebook they were considered to have withdrawn from the competition and since they have played more than a half of matches in the second part of the season, those matches were considered valid and all further matches were awarded as 3–0 forfeit wins to their opponents. Also according to the rulebook, since Varaždin left the competition after the 24th round, the number of matches they have played will stay at 24 in the league table.)

Source: Sportnet.hr
Rules for classification: 1) points; 2) goal difference; 3) number of goals scored.
For deciding champions, qualification to UEFA Europa League and relegation: 1st points; 2nd head-to-head points; 3rd head-to-head goal difference; 4th head-to-head away goals scored
(C) Champions; (D) Disqualified; (R) Relegated

=== Druga HNL ===
Pos	Team	Pld	W	D	L	GF	GA	GD	Pts	Promotion or relegation
1	Dugopolje (C)	28	17	6	5	50	27	+23	57	Promotion to Croatian First Football League declined
2	Pomorac	28	18	2	8	63	30	+33	56	
3	Mosor	28	15	7	6	36	16	+20	52	
4	Vinogradar	28	15	5	8	47	32	+15	50	
5	Imotski	28	11	9	8	26	21	+5	42	
6	Rudeš	28	11	8	9	42	33	+9	41	
7	Gorica	28	10	10	8	27	24	+3	40	
8	Hrvatski Dragovoljac	28	10	10	8	36	37	−1	40	
9	Radnik Sesvete	28	10	9	9	34	31	+3	39	
10	Junak	28	10	9	9	29	27	+2	39	
11	Solin	28	10	5	13	35	45	−10	35	
12	Marsonia 1909 (R)	28	8	6	14	25	50	−25	30	Relegation to Croatian Third Football League
13	Međimurje (R)	28	5	7	16	31	60	−29	22	Relegation to Croatian Third Football League
14	HAŠK	28	6	3	19	33	52	−19	21	
15	Croatia Sesvete (Note: Croatia Sesvete were deducted 1 point) (R)	28	4	4	20	23	52	−29	15	Relegation to Croatian Third Football League

Source: Druga-HNL.hr, Sportnet.hr (in Croatian)
Rules for classification: 1st points; 2nd goal difference; 3rd goals scored
For deciding champion, promotion and relegation: 1st points; 2nd head-to-head points; 3rd head-to-head goal difference; 4th head-to-head away goals scored
(C) Champions; (R) Relegated

== Croatian clubs in Europe ==
=== Summary ===
Club	Competition	Starting round	Final round	Matches played
Dinamo Zagreb	UEFA Champions League	2nd qualifying round	Group stage	12
Hajduk Split	UEFA Europa League	3rd qualifying round	3rd qualifying round	2
RNK Split	UEFA Europa League	2nd qualifying round	3rd qualifying round	4
Varaždin	UEFA Europa League	1st qualifying round	3rd qualifying round	6

=== Dinamo Zagreb ===
Date	Venue	Opponents	Score	Dinamo scorer(s)	Report
2011–12 Champions League – Second qualifying round
13 July 2011	Stadion Maksimir, Zagreb (H)	(Azerbaijan) Neftchi Baku	3–0	Badelj, Krstanović (2)	UEFA.com
19 July 2011	Tofiq Bahramov Stadium, Baku (A)	(Azerbaijan) Neftchi Baku	0–0		UEFA.com
2011–12 Champions League – Third qualifying round
27 July 2011	Sonera Stadium, Helsinki (A)	(Finland) HJK Helsinki	2–1	Rafinha (o.g.), Sammir	UEFA.com
3 August 2011	Stadion Maksimir, Zagreb (H)	(Finland) HJK Helsinki	1–0	Ibáñez	UEFA.com
2011–12 Champions League – Play-off round
17 August 2011	Stadion Maksimir, Zagreb (H)	(Sweden) Malmö FF	4–1	Sammir (2), Rukavina, Bećiraj	UEFA.com
23 August 2011	Swedbank Stadion, Malmö (A)	(Sweden) Malmö FF	0–2		UEFA.com
2011–12 Champions League – Group stage
14 September 2011	Stadion Maksimir, Zagreb (H)	(Spain) Real Madrid	0–1		UEFA.com
27 September 2011	Stade de Gerland, Lyon (A)	(France) Lyon	0–2		UEFA.com
18 October 2011	Stadion Maksimir, Zagreb (H)	(Netherlands) Ajax	0–2		UEFA.com
2 November 2011	Amsterdam Arena, Amsterdam (A)	(Netherlands) Ajax	0–4		UEFA.com
22 November 2011	Santiago Bernabéu Stadium, Madrid (A)	(Spain) Real Madrid	2–6	Bećiraj, Tomečak	UEFA.com
7 December 2011	Stadion Maksimir, Zagreb (H)	(France) Lyon	1–7	Kovačić	UEFA.com

=== Hajduk Split ===
Date	Venue	Opponents	Score	Hajduk scorer(s)	Report
2011–12 Europa League – Third qualifying round
28 July 2011	Britannia Stadium, Stoke (A)	(England) Stoke City	0–1		UEFA.com
4 August 2011	Poljud, Split (H)	(England) Stoke City	0–1		UEFA.com

=== RNK Split ===
Date	Venue	Opponents	Score	RNK Split scorer(s)	Report
2011–12 Europa League – Second qualifying round
14 July 2011	Sports Park, Domžale (A)	(Slovenia) Domžale	2–1	Čop, Vitaić	UEFA.com
21 July 2011	Stadion Hrvatski vitezovi, Dugopolje (H)	(Slovenia) Domžale	3–1	Čop, Vidić, Milović	UEFA.com
2011–12 Europa League – Third qualifying round
28 July 2011	Stadion Hrvatski vitezovi, Dugopolje (H)	(England) Fulham	0–0		UEFA.com
4 August 2011	Craven Cottage, London (A)	(England) Fulham	0–2		UEFA.com

=== Varaždin ===
Date	Venue	Opponents	Score	Varaždin scorer(s)	Report
2011–12 Europa League – First qualifying round
30 June 2011	Stadion Varteks, Varaždin (H)	(Andorra) Lusitanos	5–1	Šafarić (2), Glavica, Glavina, Vugrinec	UEFA.com
7 July 2011	Estadi Comunal d'Aixovall, Aixovall (A)	(Andorra) Lusitanos	1–0	Brlečić	UEFA.com
2011–12 Europa League – Second qualifying round
14 July 2011	The Small Arena, Tiraspol (A)	(Moldova) Iskra-Stal	1–1	Tkalčić	UEFA.com
21 July 2011	Stadion Varteks, Varaždin (H)	(Moldova) Iskra-Stal	3–1	Vugrinec (2), Glavica	UEFA.com
2011–12 Europa League – Third qualifying round
28 July 2011	Stadionul Dinamo, Bucharest (A)	(Romania) Dinamo București	2–2	Sačer, Vugrinec	UEFA.com
4 August 2011	Stadion Varteks, Varaždin (H)	(Romania) Dinamo București	1–2	Golubar	UEFA.com
