= 2010–11 in Croatian football =

First Division champions
- Dinamo Zagreb (13th title)

Second Division champions
- Gorica

Third Division champions
- Podravina (East); Raštane (South); Radnik Sesvete (West)

Croatian Cup winners
- Dinamo Zagreb (11th title)

Teams in Europe
- Cibalia, Dinamo Zagreb, Hajduk Split, Šibenik

Croatia national team
- UEFA Euro 2012 qualifying

The following article presents a summary of the 2010–11 football (soccer) season in Croatia, which was the 20th season of competitive football in the country.

== National teams ==
=== Croatia ===
Date	Venue	Opponents	Score	Croatia scorer(s)	Report
Friendly matches
11 August 2010	Štadión Pasienky, Bratislava (A)	Slovakia	1–1	Jelavić	HNS-CFF.hr
12 October 2010	Maksimir Stadium, Zagreb (H)	Norway	2–1	Mandžukić, Kranjčar	HNS-CFF.hr
9 February 2011	Stadion Aldo Drosina, Pula (H)	Czech Republic	4–2	Eduardo, Kalinić (2), Iličević	HNS-CFF.hr
29 March 2011	Stade de France, Saint-Denis (A)	France	0–0		HNS-CFF.hr
UEFA Euro 2012 qualifying
3 September 2010	Skonto Stadium, Riga (A)	Latvia	3–0	Petrić, Olić, Srna	UEFA.com
7 September 2010	Maksimir Stadium, Zagreb (H)	Greece	0–0		UEFA.com
9 October 2010	Ramat Gan Stadium, Ramat Gan (A)	Israel	2–1	Kranjčar (2)	UEFA.com
17 November 2010	Maksimir Stadium, Zagreb (H)	Malta	3–0	Kranjčar (2), Kalinić	UEFA.com
26 March 2011	Boris Paichadze Stadium, Tbilisi (A)	Georgia	0–1		UEFA.com

=== Croatia U21 ===
Date	Venue	Opponents	Score	Croatia scorer(s)	Report
2011 UEFA European Under-21 Football Championship qualification – Group stage
11 August 2010	Stadion Varteks, Varaždin (H)	Norway	4–1	Lovren (2), Jajalo, Kreilach	UEFA.com
4 September 2010	Stadion Čika Dača, Kragujevac (A)	Serbia	2–2	Perišić (2)	UEFA.com
2011 UEFA European Under-21 Football Championship qualification – Play-offs
9 October 2010	Municipal El Plantío, Burgos (A)	Spain	1–2	Školnik	UEFA.com
12 October 2010	Stadion Varteks, Varaždin (H)	Spain	0–3		UEFA.com
Friendly matches
16 November 2010	Stadion ŠRC Zaprešić, Zaprešić (H)	Slovenia	2–1	Lendrić, Sačer	HNS-CFF.hr
9 February 2011	Bonifika Stadium, Koper (A)	Slovenia	1–1	Pamić	HNS-CFF.hr
24 March 2011	Stadion Hrvatski vitezovi, Dugopolje (H)	Ukraine	1–2	Lendrić	HNS-CFF.hr
28 March 2011	Stadion Park mladeži, Split (H)	Hungary	3–2	Pavlović, F. Škvorc, Kramarić	HNS-CFF.hr

=== Croatia U19 ===
Date	Venue	Opponents	Score	Croatia scorer(s)	Report
2010 UEFA European Under-19 Football Championship
18 July 2010	Stade Henry Janne, Bayeux (A)	Spain	1–2	Andrijašević	UEFA.com
21 July 2010	Stade Michel Farré, Mondeville (A)	Italy	0–0		UEFA.com
24 July 2010	Stade Henry Janne, Bayeux (A)	Portugal	5–0	Pamić (3), Andrijašević, Ozobić	UEFA.com
27 July 2010	Stade Michel d'Ornano, Caen (A)	France	1–2	Ademi	UEFA.com
2011 UEFA European Under-19 Football Championship qualifying round
7 October 2010	Slokas Stadium, Jūrmala (A)	Faroe Islands	2–2	Jakoliš, Mance	UEFA.com
9 October 2010	SB Arkadija, Riga (A)	Latvia	2–1	Čulina, Mance	UEFA.com
12 October 2010	Slokas Stadium, Jūrmala (A)	Italy	1–3	Mance	UEFA.com
2011 UEFA European Under-19 Football Championship elite round
24 May 2011	Stadion Valbruna, Rovinj (H)	Estonia	1–0	Mić	UEFA.com
26 May 2011	Gradski stadion Laco, Novigrad (H)	Belgium	2–3	Blažević, Mić	UEFA.com
29 May 2011	Stadion Valbruna, Rovinj (H)	Portugal	0–1		UEFA.com

=== Croatia U17 ===
Date	Venue	Opponents	Score	Croatia scorer(s)	Report
2011 UEFA European Under-17 Football Championship qualifying round
27 September 2010	Gradski stadion, Crikvenica (H)	Israel	2–2	Ivančić, Špehar	UEFA.com
29 September 2010	Stadion Mavrinci, Čavle (H)	Bulgaria	2–1	Špehar (2)	UEFA.com
2 October 2010	Stadion Žuknica, Kostrena (H)	Greece	0–0		UEFA.com
2011 UEFA European Under-17 Football Championship elite round
24 March 2011	Sportcomplex Varkenoord, Rotterdam (A)	Portugal	0–0		UEFA.com
26 March 2011	Sportcomplex Varkenoord, Rotterdam (A)	Netherlands	0–0		UEFA.com
29 March 2011	Sportpark De Bongerd, Barendrecht (A)	Austria	2–0	Šimunović, Špehar	UEFA.com

== League tables ==
=== Prva HNL ===
Pos	Team	Pld	W	D	L	GF	GA	GD	Pts	Qualification or relegation
1	Dinamo Zagreb (C)	30	22	6	2	52	12	+40	72	Qualification to Champions League second qualifying round
2	Hajduk Split	30	16	7	7	54	32	+22	55	Qualification to Europa League third qualifying round
3	RNK Split	30	16	5	9	38	22	+16	53	Qualification to Europa League second qualifying round
4	Cibalia	30	12	8	10	33	24	+9	44	
5	Inter Zaprešić	30	12	6	12	31	35	−4	42	
6	Karlovac	30	11	8	11	25	27	−2	41	
7	Slaven Belupo	30	10	10	10	34	30	+4	40	
8	Osijek	30	9	12	9	31	29	+2	39	
9	Rijeka	30	9	12	9	29	35	−6	39	
10	Zadar	30	11	5	14	31	34	−3	38	
11	Varaždin	30	9	9	12	32	38	−6	36	Qualification to Europa League first qualifying round (Note: Champions League-bound Dinamo Zagreb won the 2010–11 Croatian Cup, so cup runners-up Varaždin will enter the first qualifying round of UEFA Europa League.)
12	Šibenik	30	8	11	11	37	38	−1	35	
13	NK Zagreb	30	9	8	13	32	39	−7	35	
14	Lokomotiva	30	8	9	13	24	37	−13	33	
15	Istra 1961	30	9	4	17	24	44	−20	31	
16	Hrvatski Dragovoljac (R)	30	5	8	17	24	55	−31	23	Relegation to Croatian Second Football League (Note: Despite finishing 14th NK Lokomotiva avoided relegation as only two second level clubs who had been granted first division licences by the Croatian Football Federation (HNS) managed to finish the season within top five places (Gorica and Lučko finished top two and the only remaining licensed club Dugopolje failed to clinch promotion as they ended the season in 8th place). However, on 20 June 2011 HNS rescinded Gorica's license which meant that only the last-placed Hrvatski Dragovoljac were replaced by Lučko, with 15th-placed Istra 1961 remaining in top flight as well.)

Source: Prva-HNL.hr
Rules for classification: 1) points; 2) goal difference; 3) number of goals scored.
For deciding champions, qualification to UEFA Europa League and relegation: 1st points; 2nd head-to-head points; 3rd head-to-head goal difference; 4th head-to-head away goals scored
(C) Champions; (R) Relegated

=== Druga HNL ===
Pos	Team	Pld	W	D	L	GF	GA	GD	Pts	Promotion or relegation
1	Gorica (C)	30	20	4	6	54	21	+33	64	
2	Lučko (P)	30	19	2	9	54	28	+26	59	Promotion to Croatian First Football League (Note: Only Lučko were granted top level license, Gorica's license was revoked after appeal from Istra 1961. Third placed Pomorac unsuccessfully tried to obtain it through arbitration.)
3	Pomorac	30	16	8	6	50	23	+27	56	
4	Rudeš	30	15	7	8	52	39	+13	52	
5	Imotski	30	14	6	10	35	32	+3	48	
6	Solin	30	13	6	11	35	33	+2	45	
7	Međimurje	30	12	6	12	53	49	+4	42	
8	Dugopolje	30	10	11	9	39	30	+9	41	
9	Junak	30	10	10	10	40	34	+6	40	
10	Vinogradar	30	12	4	14	43	38	+5	40	
11	Croatia Sesvete	30	12	4	14	37	41	−4	40	
12	MV Croatia	30	11	6	13	42	42	0	39	
13	HAŠK	30	11	5	14	40	42	−2	38	Relegation to Croatian Third Football League (Note: Only two teams from Treća HNL were granted license for competing in the Druga HNL, but only Radnik Sesvete was promoted as Segesta didn't finish the season within top five places.)
14	Mosor	30	9	7	14	32	41	−9	34	Relegation to Croatian Third Football League
15	Vukovar '91 (R)	30	6	2	22	21	83	−62	20	Relegation to Croatian Third Football League
16	Suhopolje (R)	30	5	2	23	22	73	−51	17	Relegation to Croatian Third Football League

Source: Druga-HNL.hr, Sportnet.hr (in Croatian)
Rules for classification: 1st points; 2nd goal difference; 3rd goals scored
For deciding champion, promotion and relegation: 1st points; 2nd head-to-head points; 3rd head-to-head goal difference; 4th head-to-head away goals scored
(C) Champions; (P) Promoted; (R) Relegated

== Croatian clubs in Europe ==
=== Summary ===
Club	Competition	Final round
Dinamo Zagreb	UEFA Champions League	Third qualifying round
Dinamo Zagreb	UEFA Europa League	Group stage
Hajduk Split	UEFA Europa League	Group stage
Cibalia	UEFA Europa League	Second qualifying round
Šibenik	UEFA Europa League	Second qualifying round

=== Dinamo Zagreb ===
Date	Venue	Opponents	Score	Dinamo scorer(s)	Report
2010–11 Champions League – Second qualifying round
13 July 2010	Maksimir, Zagreb (H)	(Slovenia) Koper	5–1	Mandžukić (2), Slepička, Sammir, Etto	UEFA.com
20 July 2010	Športni Park, Nova Gorica (A)	(Slovenia) Koper	0–3		UEFA.com
2010–11 Champions League – Third qualifying round
27 July 2010	Sheriff Stadium, Tiraspol (A)	(Moldova) Sheriff Tiraspol	1–1	Sammir	UEFA.com
4 August 2010	Maksimir, Zagreb (H)	(Moldova) Sheriff Tiraspol	1–1	Sammir	UEFA.com
2010–11 Europa League – Play-off round
19 August 2010	ETO Park, Győr (A)	(Hungary) Győri ETO	2–0	Rukavina (2)	UEFA.com
26 August 2010	Maksimir, Zagreb (H)	(Hungary) Győri ETO	2–1	Sammir (2)	UEFA.com
2010–11 Europa League – Group stage
16 Sep 2010	Maksimir, Zagreb (H)	(Spain) Villarreal	2–0	Rukavina, Sammir	UEFA.com
30 Sep 2010	Toumba Stadium, Thessaloniki (A)	(Greece) PAOK	0–1		UEFA.com
21 Oct 2010	Maksimir, Zagreb (H)	(Belgium) Club Brugge	0–0		UEFA.com
4 Nov 2010	Jan Breydel Stadium, Bruges (A)	(Belgium) Club Brugge	2–0	Sammir, Bišćan	UEFA.com
2 Dec 2010	El Madrigal, Villarreal (A)	(Spain) Villareal	0–3		UEFA.com
15 Dec 2010	Maksimir, Zagreb (H)	(Greece) PAOK	0–1		UEFA.com

=== Hajduk Split ===
Date	Venue	Opponents	Score	Hajduk scorer(s)	Report
2010–11 Europa League – Third qualifying round
29 July 2010	Stadionul Dinamo, Bucharest (A)	(Romania) Dinamo Bucharest	1–3	Tomasov	UEFA.com
5 August 2010	Poljud, Split (H)	(Romania) Dinamo Bucharest	3–0	Vukušić, Brkljača, Tomasov	UEFA.com
2010–11 Europa League – Play-off round
19 August 2010	Poljud, Split (H)	(Romania) Unirea Urziceni	4–1	Ibričić (2), Brkljača, Čop	UEFA.com
26 August 2010	Stadionul Steaua, Bucharest (A)	(Romania) Unirea Urziceni	1–1	Vukušić	UEFA.com
2010–11 Europa League – Group stage
16 Sep 2010	Olympic Stadium, Athens (A)	(Greece) AEK Athens	1–3	Ibričić	UEFA.com
30 Sep 2010	Poljud, Split (H)	(Belgium) Anderlecht	1–0	Vukušić	UEFA.com
21 Oct 2010	Petrovsky Stadium, St. Petersburg (A)	(Russia) Zenit St. Petersburg	0–2		UEFA.com
4 Nov 2010	Poljud, Split (H)	(Russia) Zenit St. Petersburg	2–3	M. Ljubičić, Vukušić	UEFA.com
1 Dec 2010	Poljud, Split (H)	(Greece) AEK Athens	1–3	J. Buljat	UEFA.com
15 Dec 2010	Constant Vanden Stock, Brussels (A)	(Belgium) Anderlecht	0–2		UEFA.com

=== Šibenik ===
Date	Venue	Opponents	Score	Šibenik scorer(s)	Report
2010–11 Europa League – First qualifying round
1 July 2010	Hrvatski vitezovi, Dugopolje (H)	(Malta) Sliema	0–0		UEFA.com
8 July 2010	Ta' Qali, Attard (A)	(Malta) Sliema	3–0	Medvid, Jakoliš, Bulat	UEFA.com
2010–11 Europa League – Second qualifying round
15 July 2010	Antonis Papadopoulos, Larnaca (A)	(Cyprus) Anorthosis	2–0	Bloudek, Bačelić-Grgić	UEFA.com
22 July 2010	Poljud, Split (H)	(Cyprus) Anorthosis	0–3		UEFA.com

=== Cibalia ===
Date	Venue	Opponents	Score	Cibalia scorer(s)	Report
2010–11 Europa League – Second qualifying round
15 July 2010	Windsor Park, Belfast (A)	(Northern Ireland) Cliftonville	0–1		UEFA.com
22 July 2010	Stadion Cibalia, Vinkovci (H)	(Northern Ireland) Cliftonville	0–0		UEFA.com
