= Croatian Academy Football League =

The Croatian Academy Football League is the top level of youth football in Croatia. It is contested by academy teams of First League clubs and is organised by the Croatian Football Federation. Since its inception, the youth league has been contested in three main age categories:

- Under-19s (Prva HNL za Juniore)
- Under-17s (Prva HNL za Kadete)
- Under-15s (Prva HNL za Pionire)

== Past winners ==
=== By season ===
The club won the senior Prva HNL and all youth level league titles in the same season.

Season	Prva HNL Academy		
Season	U19 (Juniori)	U17 (Kadeti)	U15 (Pioniri)
1991–92	Rijeka	HAŠK Građanski	NK Zagreb
1992–93	Varteks	Osijek	Hajduk Split
1993–94	Osijek	Osijek	Hajduk Split
1994–95	Hajduk Split	Hajduk Split	Osijek
1995–96	Rijeka	Hajduk Split	Rijeka
1996–97	Hajduk Split	Hajduk Split	Dinamo Zagreb
1997–98	Hajduk Split	Varteks	Dinamo Zagreb
1998–99	Varteks	Croatia Zagreb	Osijek
1999–2000	Dinamo Zagreb	Dinamo Zagreb	Rijeka
2000–01	Dinamo Zagreb	Hajduk Split	Osijek
2001–02	Dinamo Zagreb	Dinamo Zagreb	Dinamo Zagreb
2002–03	Dinamo Zagreb	Dinamo Zagreb	NK Zagreb
2003–04	Hajduk Split	Hajduk Split	Dinamo Zagreb
2004–05	Hajduk Split	Hajduk Split	Dinamo Zagreb
2005–06	Osijek	Dinamo Zagreb	Varteks
2006–07	NK Zagreb	NK Zagreb	Dinamo Zagreb
2007–08	Varteks	Dinamo Zagreb	
2008–09	Dinamo Zagreb	Dinamo Zagreb	Hajduk Split
2009–10	Dinamo Zagreb	Dinamo Zagreb	Dinamo Zagreb
2010–11	Dinamo Zagreb	Dinamo Zagreb	Hajduk Split
2011–12	Hajduk Split	Hajduk Split	
2012–13	Osijek	Dinamo Zagreb	
2013–14	Rijeka	Dinamo Zagreb	
2014–15	RNK Split	Dinamo Zagreb	Dinamo Zagreb
2015–16	Dinamo Zagreb	Dinamo Zagreb	Dinamo Zagreb
2016–17	Lokomotiva	Dinamo Zagreb	Dinamo Zagreb
2017–18	Dinamo Zagreb	Dinamo Zagreb	Dinamo Zagreb
2018–19	Dinamo Zagreb	Dinamo Zagreb	Lokomotiva
2019–20	Hajduk Split*	Dinamo Zagreb*	Istra 1961*
2020–21	Hajduk Split	Dinamo Zagreb	Osijek
2021–22	Hajduk Split	Dinamo Zagreb	Dinamo Zagreb
2022–23	Dinamo Zagreb	Osijek	Hajduk Split
2023–24	Dinamo Zagreb	Dinamo Zagreb	Gorica

- Championship canceled due to COVID-19

=== By titles ===
==== Under 19 ====
- 10 wins Dinamo Zagreb U19
- 7 wins Hajduk Split U19
- 3 wins Osijek U19, Rijeka U19, Varteks U19
- 1 win Lokomotiva U19, NK Zagreb U19

==== Under 17 ====
- 18 wins Dinamo Zagreb U17 (including two titles as "HAŠK Građanski" and "Croatia Zagreb")
- 7 wins Hajduk Split U17
- 2 wins Osijek U17
- 1 win Varteks U17, NK Zagreb U17

==== Under 15 ====
- 11 wins Dinamo Zagreb U15
- 4 wins Hajduk Split U15
- 3 wins Osijek U15
- 2 wins NK Zagreb U15
- 1 win Istra U15, Lokomotiva U15, Varteks U15

=== Top scorers ===
Season	Prva HNL Academy					
Season	U19 (Juniori)	Goals	U17 (Kadeti)	Goals	U15 (Pioniri)	Goals
2005–06	Slavko Blagojević (Cibalia)	12	Igor Prijić (Osijek)	25	Not held	
2006–07	Marko Šimić (NK Zagreb)	19	Alen Buljević (Osijek)	21	Not held	
2007–08	Nikola Frljužec (Varteks)	35	Andrej Kramarić (Dinamo Zagreb)	33	Not held	
2008–09	Mario Sačer (Varteks)	32	Armando Mance (Rijeka)	24	Not held	
2009–10	Ivan Lendrić (Hajduk Split)	20	Marko Livaja (Hajduk Split)	20	Not held	
2010–11	Armando Mance (Rijeka)	17	Tomislav Kiš (Croatia Sesvete)	27	Not held	
2011–12	Tomislav Horvat (Lokomotiva)	25	Marko Kolar (Dinamo Zagreb)	38	Not held	
2012–13	Dino Špehar (Dinamo Zagreb)	25	Robert Murić (Dinamo Zagreb)	21	Not held	
2013–14	Ivan Prskalo (Hajduk Split)	18	Borna Miklić (Dinamo Zagreb)	23	Not held	
2014–15	Not held		Bruno Rihtar (Lokomotiva)	22	Jakov Blagaić (Hajduk Split)	23
2015–16	Ivor Ljubanović (Istra 1961)	16	Dario Špikić (Dinamo Zagreb)	24	Bruno Jenjić (Hajduk Split)	23
2016–17	Edi Horvat (Inter Zaprešić)	16	Leon Šipoš (Dinamo Zagreb)	26	Nikola Pavlović (NK Zagreb)	18
2017–18	Milan Ristovski (Rijeka)	17	Ivan Šarić (Hajduk Split)	27	Bartol Barišić (Dinamo Zagreb)	48
2018–19	Ivan Šarić (Hajduk Split)	13	Ivan Laća (Šibenik)	19	Marko Batur (Lokomotiva)	19
2019–20	Mario Čuić (Hajduk Split)	12	Bartol Barišić (Dinamo Zagreb)	21	Marko Cukon (Istra)	16
2020–21						
