= Marko Pajač =

Croatian footballer (born 1993)

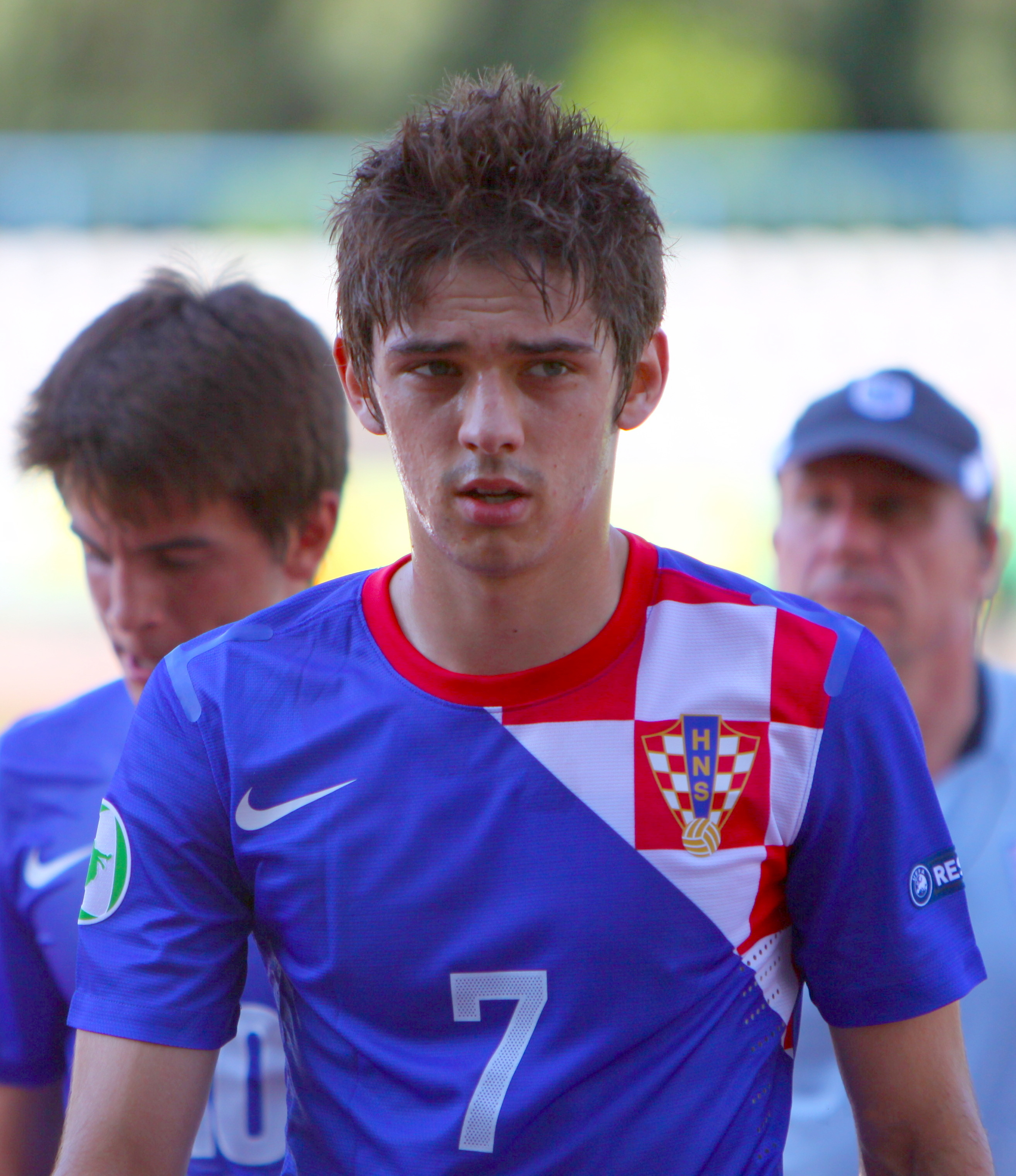
- Pajač with Croatia U19 in 2012

Personal information
- Full name: Marko Pajač
- Date of birth: 11 May 1993 (age 33)
- Place of birth: Zagreb, Croatia
- Height: 1.85 m (6 ft 1 in)
- Position: Left back

Team information
- Current team: Lokomotiva
- Number: 17

Youth career
- –2006: Zelina
- 2006–2012: Varteks / Varaždin

Senior career*
Years	Team	Apps	(Gls)
2011–2012	Varaždin	10	(0)
2012–2014	Lokomotiva	18	(1)
2012–2013	→ Radnik Sesvete (loan)	24	(5)
2014–2015	Videoton	0	(0)
2015–2016	Celje	19	(4)
2016–2021	Cagliari	4	(0)
2016–2017	→ Benevento (loan)	16	(1)
2017–2018	→ Perugia (loan)	36	(0)
2019	→ Empoli (loan)	10	(2)
2019–2020	→ Genoa (loan)	11	(0)
2021–2022	Brescia	57	(3)
2022–2024	Genoa	10	(0)
2023–2024	→ Reggiana (loan)	13	(0)
2024–	Lokomotiva	47	(6)

International career
2011	Croatia U18	3	(0)
2011–2012	Croatia U19	12	(4)
2012–2013	Croatia U20	5	(0)
2013–2014	Croatia U21	2	(0)
- * Club domestic league appearances and goals as of 15 June 2026

Marko Pajač (Croatian pronunciation: [mâːrko pǎjatʃ]; born 11 May 1993) is a Croatian professional footballer who plays as a left back for Lokomotiva.

== Club career ==
Pajač came up through the Varteks youth academy, starting in 2006. The organization lost its major sponsor, the Varteks clothes factory, and changed its name to NK Varaždin in June 2010, just a month before Pajač signed a scholarship contract with them. He made his debut for the first team against Lusitanos on 30 June 2011 in the first qualifying round of the 2011–12 UEFA Europa League as a second-half substitute. Varaždin won the match 5–1, with Pajač sent-off in the stoppage time for a professional foul. The following month, Pajač signed a professional contract with Varaždin. After the financially struggling Varaždin was expelled from the 2011–12 Prva HNL, Pajač signed a five-year contract with Lokomotiva in June 2012.

On 29 August 2014, Pajač signed a three-year contract with the Hungarian club Videoton.

On 31 January 2019, Pajac joined Empoli on loan with an option to buy until 30 June 2019.

On 20 August 2019, Pajač joined Genoa on loan with an option to buy.

On 1 February 2021, Pajač completed a move to Brescia.

On 11 July 2022, Pajač returned to Genoa.

== Career statistics ==
As of match played 1 February 2021

Appearances and goals by club, season and competition
Club	Season	League			National cup		League cup		Europe		Total	
Club	Season	Division	Apps	Goals	Apps	Goals	Apps	Goals	Apps	Goals	Apps	Goals
Varaždin	2011–12	Prva HNL	10	0	1	0	—		1 (Note: Appearance in the Europa League)	0	12	0
Lokomotiva Zagreb	2012–13	Prva HNL	0	0	0	0	—		—		0	0
Lokomotiva Zagreb	2013–14	Prva HNL	14	0	0	0	—		0	0	14	0
Lokomotiva Zagreb	2014–15	Prva HNL	4	1	0	0	—		—		4	1
Lokomotiva Zagreb	Total		18	1	0	0	—		0	0	18	1
Radnik Sesvete (loan)	2012–13	Druga HNL	24	5	0	0	—		—		24	5
Videoton	2014–15	Nemzeti Bajnokság I	0	0	2	0	6	0	—		8	0
Videoton	2015–16	Nemzeti Bajnokság I	0	0	0	0	0	0	1 (Note: Appearance in the Champions League)	0	1	0
Videoton	Total		0	0	2	0	6	0	1	0	9	0
NK Celje	2015–16	Slovenian PrvaLiga	19	4	4	1	—		0	0	23	5
Cagliari	2016–17	Serie A	1	0	0	0	—		—		1	0
Cagliari	2018–19	Serie A	3	0	1	0	—		—		4	0
Cagliari	2020–21	Serie A	0	0	0	0	—		—		0	0
Cagliari	Total		4	0	1	0	—		—		5	0
Benevento (loan)	2016–17	Serie B	16	1	0	0	—		—		16	1
Perugia (loan)	2017–18	Serie B	36	0	2	0	—		1	0	39	0
Empoli (loan)	2018–19	Serie A	10	2	0	0	—		—		10	2
Genoa (loan)	2019–20	Serie A	11	0	1	0	—		—		12	0
Brescia	2020–21	Serie B	0	0	—		—		—		0	0
Career total			148	13	11	1	6	0	3	0	168	14
