= Antolek =

Antolek is a surname. Notable people with the surname include:

- Vladimir Antolek (1905–1988), Croatian cellist
- Ivan Antolek (born 1993), Croatian footballer
