= Prva HNL Player of the Year =

Croatian soccer award

The Prva HNL Player of the Year award (Croatian: Najbolji nogometaš HNL) was an annual association football award given by the Croatian newspaper Slobodna Dalmacija. It was awarded to the best football player who plied his trade in the Prva HNL (or "1. HNL"), Croatian top flight and winners were chosen by the newspaper's sports editors. Winners for the preceding year were usually announced around 1 January and all players who had spent the entire calendar year playing in the league were eligible for the award, regardless of their nationality. The award was established in 1992 and lasted until 2010 when it was awarded for the last time.

Igor Cvitanović holds the record for most wins with three awards won between 1992 and 1997, followed by Stipe Pletikosa and Niko Kranjčar with two wins each. The current award holder is Sammir of Dinamo Zagreb.

Another similar award is the Yellow Shirt Award which is based on aggregate player ratings in matches throughout the season as judged by the country's only sports daily Sportske novosti.

== Winners ==
† denotes shared wins

Year	Player (Wins)	Club(s)
1992 †	(Croatia) Slaven Bilić (1)	Hajduk Split
1992 †	(Croatia) Igor Cvitanović (1)	Varteks / HAŠK Građanski
1992 †	(Croatia) Ardian Kozniku (1)	Hajduk Split
1993	(Croatia) Joško Jeličić (1)	Hajduk Split / Croatia Zagreb
1994	(Bosnia and Herzegovina) Mirsad Hibić (1)	Hajduk Split
1995	(Croatia) Nenad Pralija (1)	Hajduk Split
1996	(Croatia) Igor Cvitanović (2)	Croatia Zagreb
1997 †	(Croatia) Igor Cvitanović (3)	Croatia Zagreb
1997 †	(Croatia) Goran Jurić (1)	Croatia Zagreb
1998	(Croatia) Dražen Ladić (1)	Croatia Zagreb
1999	(Croatia) Tomislav Rukavina (1)	Croatia Zagreb
2000	(Croatia) Nenad Bjelica (1)	Osijek
2001	(Croatia) Stipe Pletikosa (1)	Hajduk Split
2002 †	(Croatia) Ivica Olić (1)	NK Zagreb / Dinamo Zagreb
2002 †	(Croatia) Stipe Pletikosa (2)	Hajduk Split
2003	(Croatia) Niko Kranjčar (1)	Dinamo Zagreb
2004	(Croatia) Tvrtko Kale (1)	Zadar / Hajduk Split
2005	(Croatia) Niko Kranjčar (2)	Hajduk Split
2006	(Croatia) Eduardo (1)	Dinamo Zagreb
2007	(Croatia) Luka Modrić (1)	Dinamo Zagreb
2008	(Croatia) Nikola Kalinić (1)	Hajduk Split
2009	(Croatia) Mario Mandžukić (1)	Dinamo Zagreb
2010	(Croatia) Sammir (1)	Dinamo Zagreb

Notes on club name changes:

- Dinamo Zagreb changed their name to "HAŠK Građanski" in June 1991 and then again in February 1993 to "Croatia Zagreb". They reverted to "Dinamo Zagreb" in February 2000.
- The NK Varteks changed their 52-year-old name to "NK Varaždin" in June 2010, then folded in 2015. Two newer clubs, both unassociated with the defunct team, use the defunct club's names: NK Varteks (founded 2011) and NK Varaždin (founded 2012 as "Varaždin ŠN", picked up the "NK Varaždin" name when the older club folded).

== See also ==
- Sportske novosti Yellow Shirt award, for the HNL footballer of the year, given by the Croatian sport newspaper Sportske novosti, chosen by sport journalists.
- Prva HNL Player of the Year (Tportal), given by the Croatian web site Tportal, chosen by captains of league clubs.
- Football Oscar, given by the Croatian union Football syndicate, chosen by players and managers of league clubs.
