= 2010–11 Croatian Football Cup =

Tournament details
- Country: Croatia
- Teams: 48

Final positions
- Champions: Dinamo Zagreb (11th title)
- Runners-up: Varaždin

Tournament statistics
- Matches played: 54
- Goals scored: 196 (3.63 per match)
- Top goal scorer: Fatos Beqiraj (10)

The 2010–11 Croatian Football Cup was the twentieth season of Croatia's football knockout competition.

The defending champions were Hajduk Split, having won their fifth title the previous year by defeating Šibenik in the final.

The cup kicked off with the single-legged preliminary round which was played on 25 August 2010. Most of the top flight clubs entered the competition in the following round, played on 21 and 22 September 2010, with the exception of Karlovac and Lokomotiva, as their cup coefficient (determined by their cup record over the last five seasons) was too low to skip the preliminary round. In addition, RNK Split and Zadar, two of the top-level clubs, failed to qualify for the competition.

== Calendar ==
| Round | Date(s) | Number of fixtures | Clubs | New entries this round |
|---|---|---|---|---|
| Preliminary round | 25 August 2010 | 16 | 48 → 32 | none |
| First round | 22 September 2010 | 16 | 32 → 16 | 16 |
| Second round | 27 October 2010 | 8 | 16 → 8 | none |
| Quarter-finals | 10 and 24 November 2010 | 8 | 8 → 4 | none |
| Semi-finals | 6 and 20 April 2011 | 4 | 4 → 2 | none |
| Final | 11 and 25 May 2011 | 2 | 2 → 1 | none |

== Preliminary round ==
The draw for the preliminary round was held on 4 August 2010, and matches were held on 25 August and 1 September 2010. This round consisted of 16 single-legged fixtures.

| Tie no | Home team | Score | Away team |
|---|---|---|---|
| 1 | Zagora Unešić | 3–0 | Jedinstvo Omladinac |
| 2 | Opatija | 2–1 | Velebit |
| 3 | Zmaj Blato | 1–1 (1–2 p) | Karlovac |
| 4 | Pazinka | 1–2 | Zadrugar |
| 5 | Vrbovec | 4–2 (aet) | Mladost Cernik |
| 6 | Mladost Petrinja | 1–2 | BSK Bijelo Brdo |
| 7 | Međimurje | 2–0 | Hrvace |
| 8 | Moslavina | 3–0 | Gaj Mače |
| 9 | Nosteria | 3–2 | Novalja |
| 10 | Graničar | 2–1 | Olimpija Osijek |
| 11^{*} | MV Croatia | 2–0 | Sloboda Slakovec |
| 12 | Bjelovar | 4–4 (3–4 p) | Suhopolje |
| 13 | Podravac | 0–1 | Rudar 47 |
| 14 | Vinogradar | 1–2 (aet) | Lokomotiva |
| 15 | Slavija Pleternica | 7–0 | Bilogorac |
| 16 | Rudeš | 4–1 | Borac Imbriovec |

* Match played on 1 September.

== First round ==
First round proper consisted of 16 single-legged matches, with 16 winners of the preliminary round joined by 16 clubs with the highest cup coefficients (including 12 out of the remaining 14 top-level clubs, excluding RNK Split and NK Zadar, whose cup coefficients were too low to enter competition). The draw for the first round was held on 2 September, and matches were played on 21 and 22 September 2010.

| Tie no | Home team | Score | Away team |
|---|---|---|---|
| 1 | Zadrugar | 0–6 | Dinamo Zagreb |
| 2^{*} | Rudar 47 | 2–10 | Hajduk Split |
| 3 | Nosteria | 2–4 | Rijeka |
| 4 | BSK Bijelo Brdo | 0–2 | Varaždin |
| 5 | Opatija | 0–1 | Slaven Belupo |
| 6 | Vrbovec | 0–2 | NK Zagreb |
| 7 | Slavija Pleternica | 3–4 (aet) | Šibenik |
| 8 | Rudeš | 0–3 | Cibalia |
| 9 | Lokomotiva | 1–2 | Inter Zaprešić |
| 10^{*} | MV Croatia | 1–2 | Osijek |
| 11 | Graničar | 0–2 | Pomorac |
| 12 | Suhopolje | 3–1 | Segesta |
| 13 | Zagora Unešić | 2–4 (aet) | HAŠK |
| 14 | Međimurje | 3–1 | Konavljanin |
| 15 | Istra 1961 | 3–1 | Hrvatski Dragovoljac |
| 16^{*} | Karlovac | 5–0 | Moslavina |

* Match played on 21 September.

== Second round ==
The second round will be contested by 16 winners from the first round and will be contested in 8 single-legged fixtures scheduled for 27 October 2010. It will be the last stage of the competition employing the single leg format as from the quarter-finals onwards all fixtures will be double-legged events.

| Tie no | Home team | Score | Away team |
|---|---|---|---|
| 1 | Karlovac | 0–2 | Dinamo Zagreb |
| 2 | Hajduk Split | 0–1 (aet) | Istra 1961 |
| 3^{*} | Rijeka | 3–1 | Međimurje |
| 4^{*} | Varaždin | 1–0 | HAŠK |
| 5 | Slaven Belupo | 2–0 | Suhopolje |
| 6^{*} | Pomorac | 0–1 | NK Zagreb |
| 7 | Osijek | 2–1 | Šibenik |
| 8 | Inter Zaprešić | 0–3 | Cibalia |

* Match played on 26 October.

== Quarter-finals ==
The eight clubs remaining in the competition after the second round were paired for the quarter-finals. From the quarter-finals onwards the ties will be played in a two-legged format. The draw was held on 28 October, first legs will be played on 10 November and second legs on 24 November 2010.

| Team 1 | Agg. | Team 2 | 1st leg | 2nd leg |
|---|---|---|---|---|
| Varaždin | 6–3 | Rijeka | 2–1 | 4–2 |
| NK Zagreb | 2–6 | Slaven Belupo | 1–1 | 1–5 |
| Istra 1961 | 2–5 | Cibalia | 2–3 | 0–2 |
| Dinamo Zagreb | 5–1 | Osijek | 2–0 | 3–1 |

== Semi-finals ==
5 April 2011
18:00

| Cibalia | 1–0 | Varaždin |
|---|---|---|
| Kresinger 31' | Report (in Croatian) |

Stadion HNK Cibalia, Vinkovci
Attendance: 2,000
Referee: Igor Pristovnik (Zagreb)
20 April 2011
18:00

| Varaždin | 3–0 | Cibalia |
|---|---|---|
| Vugrinec 47', 84' (pen.); F. Škvorc 80' | Report (in Croatian) | Parmaković (red card) 83' |

Stadion Varteks, Varaždin
Attendance: 4,000
Referee: Fran Jović (Zagreb)

Varaždin won 3–1 on aggregate

6 April 2011
18:00

| Dinamo Zagreb | 4–1 | Slaven Belupo |
|---|---|---|
| Sammir 7' (pen.); Sylvestr 9'; Badelj 23' (pen.); Tomečak 88' | Report (in Croatian) | Benko 35' |

Stadion Maksimir, Zagreb
Attendance: 1,000
Referee: Ivan Bebek (Rijeka)
20 April 2011
18:00

| Slaven Belupo | 0–1 | Dinamo Zagreb |
|---|---|---|
| | Report (in Croatian) | Tomečak 85' |

Gradski stadion, Koprivnica
Attendance: 3,500
Referee: Domagoj Vučkov (Rijeka)

Dinamo Zagreb won 5–1 on aggregate

== Final ==
=== First leg ===
11 May 2011
20:10

| Dinamo Zagreb | 5–1 | Varaždin |
|---|---|---|
| Sammir 10'; Tonel 45+1'; Bećiraj 72', 79'; Badelj 80' | Report (in Croatian) | D. Škvorc 35' |

Stadion Maksimir, Zagreb
Attendance: 5,000
Referee: Ivan Bebek (Rijeka)

=== Second leg ===
25 May 2011
20:10

| Varaždin | 1–3 | Dinamo Zagreb |
|---|---|---|
| Šafarić 6' | Report (in Croatian) | Ibáñez 10'; Badelj 70'; Bećiraj 82' |

Stadion Varteks, Varaždin
Attendance: 3,500
Referee: Domagoj Vučkov (Rijeka)

Dinamo Zagreb win 8–2 on aggregate.

== See also ==
- 2010–11 Croatian First Football League
- 2010–11 Croatian Second Football League
