= Petar Tomić =

Croatian footballer

Personal information
- Date of birth: 29 October 1982 (age 44)
- Place of birth: Vinkovci, SR Croatia, SFR Yugoslavia
- Height: 1.93 m (6 ft 4 in)
- Position: Defender

Youth career
- 1995–2003: Nosteria

Senior career*
Years	Team	Apps	(Gls)
2003–2005	Cibalia	7	(1)
2005–2006	Kamen Ingrad	35	(4)
2007	Inter Zaprešić	3	(0)
2007–2009	Slavonac CO	25	(5)
2009–2012	Cibalia	60	(3)
2012–2013	Šibenik	23	(1)
2014–2016	Slavonija Požega		
2016–2017	Mladost Antin		
2018	Nosteria		

International career^{‡}
1998–2000	Croatia U17	4	(0)

Managerial career
- 2018–2019: Cibalia
- 2020–2021: Cibalia
- * Club domestic league appearances and goals as of 4 December 2011 ‡ National team caps and goals as of 7 May 2003

Petar Tomić (born 29 October 1982) is a Croatian former football defender and most recently manager of Cibalia Vinkovci.

He resigned as manager of Cibalia in September 2021.
