= Nikola Tkalčić =

Croatian footballer

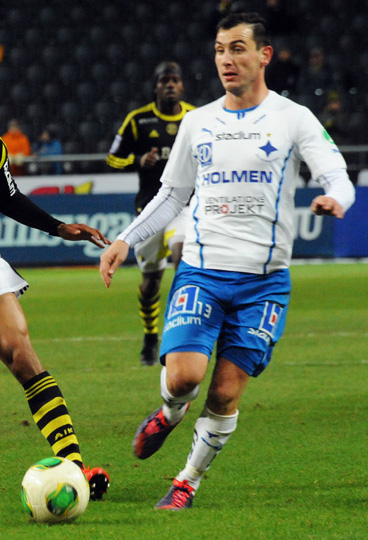

Personal information
- Date of birth: 3 December 1989 (age 36)
- Place of birth: Zagreb, SR Croatia, SFR Yugoslavia
- Height: 1.75 m (5 ft 9 in)
- Position: Right back

Team information
- Current team: Sylvia
- Number: 6

Youth career
- 1997–1999: NK Sloga Konjščina
- 1999–2008: NK Varteks

Senior career*
Years	Team	Apps	(Gls)
2008–2011	Varteks Varaždin	37	(1)
2008–2009	→ Sloboda Varaždin (loan)		
2011–2017	Norrköping	106	(8)
2018	Sarpsborg 08	0	(0)
2018	→ Aalesund (loan)	13	(0)
2019	Jönköpings Södra	8	(0)
2019–2021	Varaždin	49	(0)
2021	Norrby	14	(0)
2022–	Sylvia	24	(0)

International career
2008	Croatia U19	1	(0)
- * Club domestic league appearances and goals as of 30 December 2022

Nikola Tkalčić (born 3 December 1989) is a Croatian football defender who plays for Swedish club Sylvia. He started his senior career in 2008 with NK Varteks, which changed its name to Varaždin during his tenure, before folding in 2015 (no relation to his current club).

== Career ==
Tkalčić started his football career in his native Konjščina, playing for the local football club NK Sloga Konjščina. At the age of 10 he moved to the Varteks academy. During his first senior season he was loaned out to their fourth-tier feeder team Sloboda Varaždin, which emerged as champions of their league, before returning to Varteks to play in the top-tier Prva HNL.

A first-team regular in the 2009/2010 season, Tkalčić was sidelined for a large part of the 2010/2011 season after rupturing his frontal cruciate ligaments in the first game of the season, returning only in March 2011.

Tkalčić moved to the Swedish team IFK Norrköping on the last day of the 2011 summer transfer window, missing all but two of the remaining matches of the 2011 season, the first and the last. He stated Armin Tanković was of great help for him while he was adapting to life in Sweden. His following three seasons at the club would be marked by ups and downs, partly due to injury problems. He played both as full-back and winger during this period. In the 2015 season, however, Tkalčić missed only 4 matches and was a regular in the side that became the 2015 Allsvenskan champions. During that period, he was IFK Norrköping's fastest player and had the strongest shot with his right foot. In 2016, he was thought of as the most underestimated player of the Allsvenskan.

Transferring to Sarpsborg 08 FF, he only featured in three cup matches and fared somewhat better during a loan to Aalesund in late 2018. On 28 February 2019, Tkalčić left Sarpsborg 08 by mutual consent. On 17 May, he then signed a contract with Jönköpings Södra IF until 30 November 2019 after a trial at the club.

On 20 January 2022, Tkalčić signed with Sylvia in the Swedish third-tier Ettan.

== International career ==
Tkalčić was capped once for the Croatia U19 team in a 16.4.2008 friendly with Hungary U19, coming in the 59th minute of the 1–0 away win for Ivan Tomečak.

== Personal life ==
Tkalčić is an avid fan of fishing and plays tennis for recreation.
