= Ante Mrmić =

Croatian footballer

Personal information
- Full name: Ante Mrmić
- Date of birth: 6 August 1992 (age 34)
- Place of birth: Vinkovci, Croatia
- Height: 1.87 m (6 ft 2 in)
- Position: Goalkeeper

Team information
- Current team: Tehničar 1974
- Number: 1

Youth career
- –2011: Varaždin

Senior career*
Years	Team	Apps	(Gls)
2011–2012	Varaždin 1931	4	(0)
2012	Dinamo Zagreb	0	(0)
2013	Vinogradar	0	(0)
2013–2014	Segesta Sisak	18	(0)
2014	Zavrč	2	(0)
2015	Bistra	9	(0)
2016–2018	Inter Zaprešić	24	(0)
2018–2020	Varaždin 2012	13	(0)
2020-	Tehničar 1974		
- * Club domestic league appearances and goals

Ante Mrmić (born 6 August 1992) is a Croatian football goalkeeper who plays for Tehničar 1974.

== Career ==
Mrmić was part of the Varaždin youth system, and also started his senior career with Varaždin. This Varaždin organisation suffered repeated financial difficulties while he was with them, and eventually folded in 2015. The NK Varaždin he plays for since 2018 is not associated with his earlier club, and the two actually co-existed for three years.

He joined Tehničar 1974 in summer 2020.
