= Ivan Antolek =

Croatian footballer (born 1993)

Personal information
- Date of birth: 27 January 1993 (age 33)
- Place of birth: Čakovec, Croatia
- Height: 1.83 m (6 ft 0 in)
- Position: Forward

Team information
- Current team: Ayia Napa
- Number: 55

Youth career
- 2003–2008: Međimurje
- 2008–2012: Varteks / Varaždin

Senior career*
Years	Team	Apps	(Gls)
2011–2012	Varaždin	9	(2)
2012–2013	AEK Larnaca	0	(0)
2013–2014	Gorica	41	(7)
2014–2015	Zavrč	15	(2)
2015–2017	Ayia Napa	24	(2)
2017–2018	Varaždin		
2018–2019	UFC Bad Radkersburg-Laafeld	19	(3)
2019	Höttur/Huginn	6	(0)
2021	ASK Schlaining	0	(0)
2011–2012	Varaždin		
2022-	Polet SNnM		
- * Club domestic league appearances and goals as of 28 May 2022

Ivan Antolek (born 27 January 1993) is a Croatian footballer who plays as a forward.

== Club career ==
Antolek was in the NK Varteks (renamed NK Varaždin mid-2010) youth system, starting his professional career with the senior Varaždin club in 2012. He previously played for Gorica. He also had spells in the Austrian lower leagues with Bad Radkersburg and Schlaining and in Iceland with Höttur/Huginn.
