= Samir Toplak =

Croatian footballer and manager

Personal information
- Date of birth: 23 April 1970 (age 56)
- Place of birth: Varaždin, SR Croatia, SFR Yugoslavia
- Height: 1.86 m (6 ft 1 in)
- Position: Defender

Team information
- Current team: Kustošija (manager)

Senior career*
Years	Team	Apps	(Gls)
1988–1998	NK Varaždin	150	(2)
1998–2002	VfL Bochum	65	(3)
2002–2003	NK Varaždin	22	(0)
Total		237	(5)

International career
1994	Croatia	2	(0)

Managerial career
- 2003–2005: Varteks (youth)
- 2005–2007: Varteks (assistant)
- 2010–2011: Varaždin
- 2011–2012: Cibalia
- 2012–2013: Gorica
- 2013–2014: Zelina
- 2014–2019: Inter Zaprešić
- 2020: Varaždin
- 2021: Lokomotiva Zagreb
- 2022: Gorica
- 2023: Kustošija
- * Club domestic league appearances and goals

Samir Toplak (born 23 April 1970) is a Croatian professional football manager and former player who is the current manager of Croatian First Football League club Kustošija.

Born in Varaždin, Toplak spent most of his playing and managerial career at his hometown club Varteks.

== Playing career ==
Toplak started his career with Varteks, in Varaždin, and spent the first ten seasons of his career there. After proving himself to be one of the best defenders in the top level Prva HNL, Toplak transferred to German Bundesliga club VfL Bochum. He spent four seasons in Germany, where the club floated between first and second division. Toplak returned to Varteks in the summer of 2002, for the last season of his top-level football career.

He played two friendly matches for Croatia in 1994, against Slovakia and Israel.

== Managerial career ==
During his last two years as a player, Toplak had started working as a youth coach in the Varteks system. Upon retirement, he became a club director and became an assistant manager (2005–2007) with the senior team. In 2010, Toplak was hired as manager of the senior team, the same year that it changed its name to NK Varaždin. He led the relatively young team, consisting mainly of Varaždin's home grown players, to a successful 2011–12 UEFA Europa League campaign, beating FC Lusitanos and Iskra-Stal before they were stopped in the third qualifying round by Romanian powerhouse Dinamo București in a narrow two leg encounter. However, the success in UEFA play was soon overshadowed when the club went bankrupt and was demoted to the very bottom of the Croatian football league system.

In August 2011 Toplak took over another Prva HNL club, HNK Cibalia, from Vinkovci. In the 2011–12 Prva HNL season, Toplak led Cibalia to a top table position and the semi-finals of the Croatian Cup. However, due to disagreements with the club's executive board, Toplak chose to leave Vinkovci in July 2012.

In December 2012, Toplak was appointed as manager of HNK Gorica, a second-level Druga HNL side located in Velika Gorica. Gorica's first half of the 2012–13 Druga HNL season had been disastrous, and they finished the first half in the relegation zone. Toplak was hired to bring the club back to the top of the chart by the end of the season. After failing to move Gorica out of the relegation zone, Toplak resigned on 20 April 2013, six games before the end of the season (Gorica did avoid relegation when other teams dropped below them during those last six games).

After leaving Gorica, Toplak took over the managerial position for another Druga HNL side, NK Zelina, succeeding Dražen Biškup. After a disastrous 2013–14 season, during which Zelina struggled on the bottom of the table, Toplak resigned in April 2014.

After, Toplak was hired by Druga HNL side Inter Zaprešić. Inter and Toplak's primary goal was to secure promotion to the Prva HNL, and this goal was accomplished by finishing as champion of the 2014–15 season. They played in the Prva HNL the following season, their only goal being to avoid relegation. However, they exceeded their target by finishing the season in the middle of the league chart. The club played in the Prva HNL through the next four seasons, but during the first half of the 2019–20 season, with the club in the bottom (8th) of the league table, Toplak was sacked on 4 January 2020.

On 10 February 2020, just a few weeks after leaving Inter Zaprešić, Toplak was hired to manage Prva HNL side NK Varaždin (no relation to the long defunct Varteks/Varaždin club he previously worked with), which was at the bottom (10th) of the league table. Toplak was able to guide the team to an 8th-place finish, while Inter Zaprešić fell to last place and was relegated to Druga HNL for the 2020–21 season. Toplak was dismissed by Varaždin in December 2020.

On 14 March 2021, he succeeded Jerko Leko as manager of Prva HNL side Lokomotiva Zagreb. After another six-months spell at HNK Gorica in 2022, he was appointed manager of Kustošija in March 2023.

== Personal life ==
His given name happens to be Bosnian which has sometimes caused confusion, as his family is actually from Kneginec near Varaždin.

In 1994 Toplak married his girlfriend of two years, Vesna. Two years later, they had their first daughter, Lana, and three years after that, while living in Bochum, Germany, daughter Bianka was born. In 2004 Toplak settled down with his family in a small village outside of Varaždin.

== Career statistics ==
Appearances and goals by club, season and competition
Club	Season	League			Cup		Total	
Club	Season	Division	Apps	Goals	Apps	Goals	Apps	Goals
NK Varteks	1992–93	Prva HNL	27	0				
NK Varteks	1993–94	Prva HNL	28	1				
NK Varteks	1994–95	Prva HNL	29	0				
NK Varteks	1995–96	Prva HNL	24	0				
NK Varteks	1996–97	Prva HNL	14	0				
NK Varteks	1997–98	Prva HNL	28	1				
NK Varteks	Total		150	2				
VfL Bochum	1998–99	Bundesliga	23	1	2	0	25	1
VfL Bochum	1999–00	2. Bundesliga	15	1	1	0	16	1
VfL Bochum	2000–01	Bundesliga	10	0	0	0	10	0
VfL Bochum	2001–02	2. Bundesliga	17	1	1	0	18	1
VfL Bochum	Total		65	3	4	0	69	3
NK Varteks	2002–03	Prva HNL	22	0				
NK Varteks	Total		22	0				
Career total			237	5				

== Managerial statistics ==
As of 26 August 2022

Managerial record by team and tenure

Team	From	To	Record				
Team	From	To	G	W	D	L	Win %
Varaždin	13 March 2010	12 August 2011	52	16	16	20	30.77
Cibalia	23 August 2011	15 July 2012	24	11	5	8	45.83
Gorica	1 December 2012	4 March 2013	9	2	5	2	22.22
Zelina	2 September 2013	17 March 2014	12	2	5	5	16.67
Inter Zaprešić	29 April 2014	10 January 2020	213	69	56	88	32.39
Varaždin	23 February 2020	7 December 2020	31	11	6	14	35.48
Lokomotiva Zagreb	14 March 2021	28 May 2021	11	3	1	7	27.27
Gorica	04 March 2022	"Present"	22	6	7	9	27.27
Total			375	120	102	153	32.00
