= Mario Sačer =

Croatian footballer

Personal information
- Full name: Mario Sačer
- Date of birth: 17 January 1990 (age 36)
- Place of birth: Varaždin, SFR Yugoslavia
- Height: 1.77 m (5 ft 10 in)
- Positions: Forward; winger

Team information
- Current team: Draskovec

Youth career
- 1996–1998: Drava Sveti Đurđ
- 1998–2000: Podravina
- 2000–2009: Varteks

Senior career*
Years	Team	Apps	(Gls)
2009	Varteks	2	(0)
2009–2012	Hajduk Split	2	(0)
2010	→ Varteks (loan)	22	(2)
2011–2012	→ Varaždin (loan)	20	(1)
2012–2013	Mura 05	20	(2)
2013	Istra 1961	11	(0)
2014	Partizani	11	(1)
2014	Podravina	13	(5)
2015	Međimurje	9	(6)
2016	Velika Polana	12	(8)
2016–2017	Dugopolje	28	(7)
2017–2018	Varaždin	37	(7)
2019	Koper		
2019	Tehnicar		
2020-2021	Trofaiach	10	(10)
2022	Podravina		
2022-	Draskovec		

International career
2004–2005	Croatia U15	1	(0)
2005–2006	Croatia U16	13	(4)
2006–2007	Croatia U17	10	(4)
2007–2008	Croatia U18	4	(0)
2009–2010	Croatia U20	1	(0)
2010–2011	Croatia U21	2	(1)
- * Club domestic league appearances and goals as of 8 December 2018

Mario Sačer (born 17 November 1990 in Varaždin) is a Croatian football striker who plays for Draskovec after spending several seasons at NK Varaždin.

== Career ==
Sačer started playing football at 6 years of age for his hometown club Drava Sveti Đurđ, moving soon to Podravina in nearby Ludbreg and finally joining the youth ranks of Varteks in 2000. He came into the spotlight playing for the Varteks U-19 team, when he was named the best player and scorer of the Prva HNL Academy for the 2008–2009 season, amassing an impressive tally of 32 goals and 14 assists in 30 games, 11 goals more than the runners-up Andrej Kramarić and Valentino Stepčić. He made his first team debut for Varteks in May 2009, entering for the last 8 minutes in the game versus Osijek.

He joined the ranks of Hajduk Split, of which he stated to be an avid fan, in late June 2009. Not breaking through initially to the first team, he was sent on loan back to Varteks during the winter transfer season, losing, however, his place in the team in mid-March, due to the dispute of his two clubs regarding the transfer fee, but returning to the first team in May, scoring two goals in the last three games of the season. He remained on loan with his hometown club, which had changed its name from NK Varteks to NK Varaždin, for the first half of the 2010–11 season, finding his position moved more and more moved to the right wing, and unable to regain his scoring streak. Returning to Hajduk Split, he was again sidelined, playing in only two games, one of which was 90 minutes against his former club. The following summer, he was again sent on loan to Varaždin for the 2011–12 season. After a series of moves, he returned to his hometown in 2017, playing for the new NK Varaždin, unassociated with the club he played with at the start of his career, which folded in 2015.

He had a spell at Austrian lower league side FC Trofaiach during the COVID-19 year.
