= NK Nosteria =

Croatian football club

Nosteria
- Full name: Nogometni klub Nosteria
- Founded: 1921
- Ground: Igralište Nosteria
- Capacity: 2,000
- Chairman: Marinko Suton
- Manager: Zoran Rubić
- League: Vukovar-Syrmia County League (5th level)
- 2009–10: 2nd
Home colours	Away colours

NK Nosteria is a Croatian association football club founded in 1921 and based in the small town of Nuštar. As of the 2009–10 season they compete in the Vukovar-Syrmia County League, 5th division in the Croatian football league system.
