= Mario Brlečić =

Croatian footballer

Personal information
- Full name: Mario Brlečić
- Date of birth: 10 January 1989 (age 37)
- Place of birth: Zagreb, SFR Yugoslavia
- Height: 1.86 m (6 ft 1 in)
- Position: Midfielder

Team information
- Current team: NK Gaj Mače
- Number: 4

Youth career
- 1999–2001: Mladost Marija Bistrica
- 2001–2003: Croatia Sesvete
- 2003–2008: Varteks

Senior career*
Years	Team	Apps	(Gls)
2008–2011	Varteks Varaždin	22	(2)
2008–2009	→ Sloboda Varaždin (loan)		
2009	→ Segesta (loan)	8	(0)
2009–2010	→ Sloboda Varaždin (loan)		
2011–2012	Inter Zaprešić	3	(0)
2012	Zelina	14	(4)
2012–2013	RNK Split	2	(0)
2013–2014	Zavrč	21	(1)
2014	Concordia Chiajna	7	(0)
2015	Travnik	11	(0)
2015	ÍBV	9	(0)
2016	Celje	8	(0)
2016–2018	Inter Zaprešić	24	(1)
2018–2019	Varaždin (2012)	16	(1)
2019–	NK Gaj Mače		

International career
2007	Croatia U18	2	(0)
- * Club domestic league appearances and goals as of 18 May 2019

Mario Brlečić (born 10 January 1989) is a Croatian football midfielder, currently playing for NK Gaj Mače.

== Club career ==
He came up through the youth academy of NK Varteks, making his professional debut with their senior club in 2008; the club changed its name to NK Varaždin in 2010. He returned to the city of Varaždin in 2018, playing for a new NK Varaždin, unassociated with his original club, which folded in 2015. In 2015 he played 9 games for Icelandic top-tier club ÍB Vestmannaeyjar.
