= Dejan Glavica =

Croatian footballer

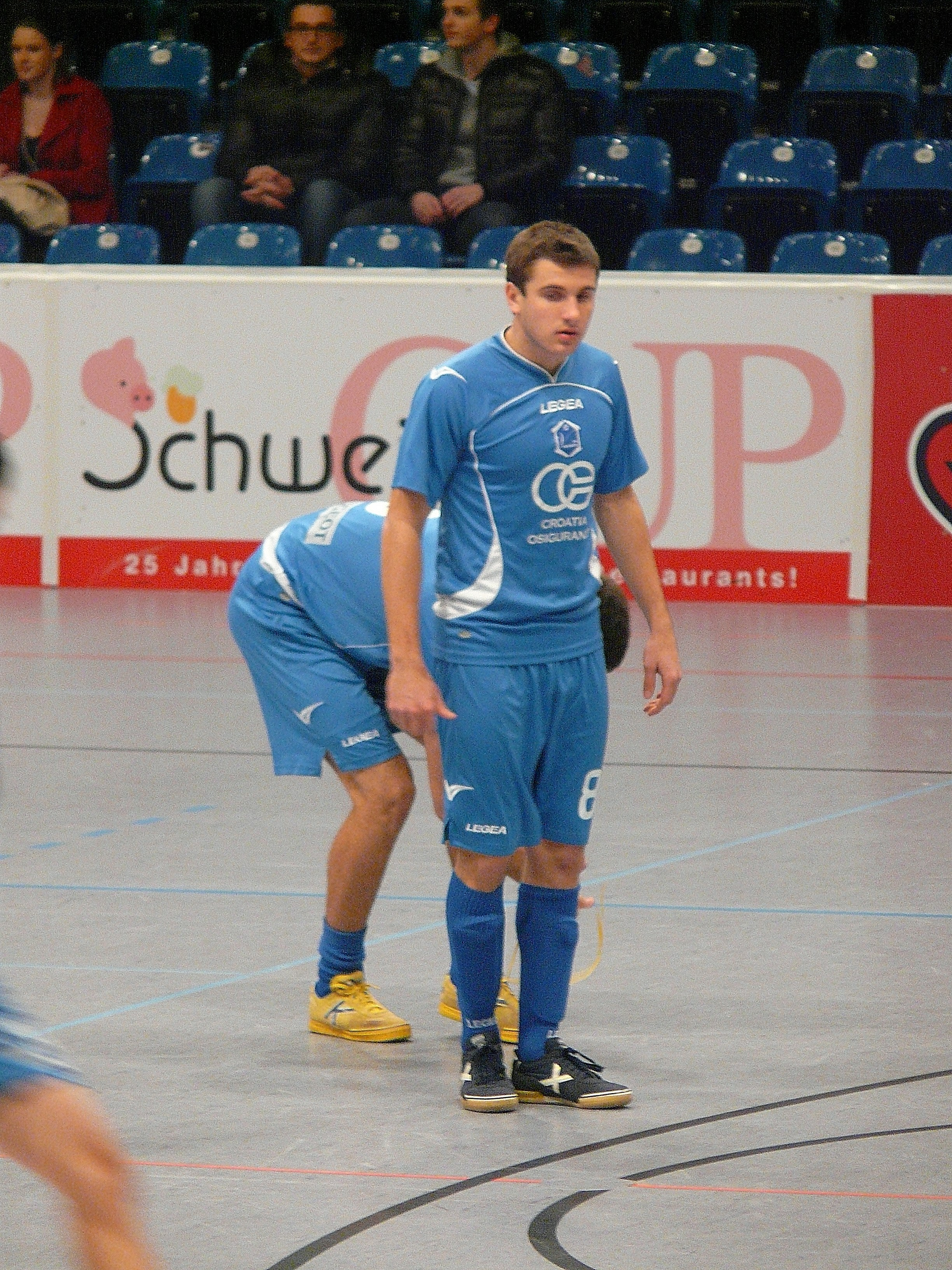

Personal information
- Full name: Dejan Glavica
- Date of birth: 20 August 1991 (age 35)
- Place of birth: Varaždin, SFR Yugoslavia
- Height: 1.72 m (5 ft 7 1/2 in)
- Position: Midfielder

Team information
- Current team: Varteks Varaždin
- Number: 30

Youth career
- 1998–2009: Varteks

Senior career*
Years	Team	Apps	(Gls)
2009–2011	Varteks / Varaždin	31	(3)
2011–2014	Slaven Belupo	73	(11)
2015	SV Horn	9	(0)
2015–2016	Zavrč	25	(3)
2016	Varteks (2011)	9	(5)
2017	Cibalia	13	(3)
2017–2022	Varaždin (2012)	69	(16)
2021-2022	→ Polet SMnM (loan)	38	(23)
2022	Polet SMnM	12	(4)
2023–	Varteks (2011)	63	(35)

International career
2010–2011	Croatia U20	4	(0)
2011–2013	Croatia U21	4	(1)
- * Club domestic league appearances and goals as of 21 April 2025

Dejan Glavica (born 20 August 1991) is a Croatian football midfielder who plays for Varteks Varaždin.

== Club career ==
Glavica came up through the NK Varteks youth academy, making his senior debut with the club's top level Prava HNL squad in 2009. The club changed its name to NK Varaždin in mid-2010. In 2011, during the 2011 Europa League Qualification Round Glavica scored an important first-leg goal against Andorran team Lusitanos. Varaždin would go on to win the game 5–1. In August 2011 he was able to terminate his contract with the financially troubled Varaždin, as they had not paid him his wages, and signed for NK Slaven Belupo.

In 2015, he signed for SV Horn in the Erste Liga.

When NK Varaždin was suspended in 2011 for financial reasons, an unassociated NK Varteks club was founded by disgruntled fans. In 2012, another NK Varaždin was founded in the city, using the name Varaždin ŠN; when the original NK Varaždin went bankrupt and folded in 2015, the Varaždin ŠN team picked up the discarded NK Varaždin name. Glavica, who started his career with the original NK Varteks / NK Varaždin organization, later played for both teams that carry the previous names – the new NK Varteks in 2016–2017, and the new NK Varaždin in 2017. Glavica is the only player to have taken the field for all variations of "NK Varteks / NK Varaždin", "NK Varteks" (of 2011) and "NK Varaždin" (of 2012).
