= Ivan Tomečak =

Croatian footballer (born 1989)

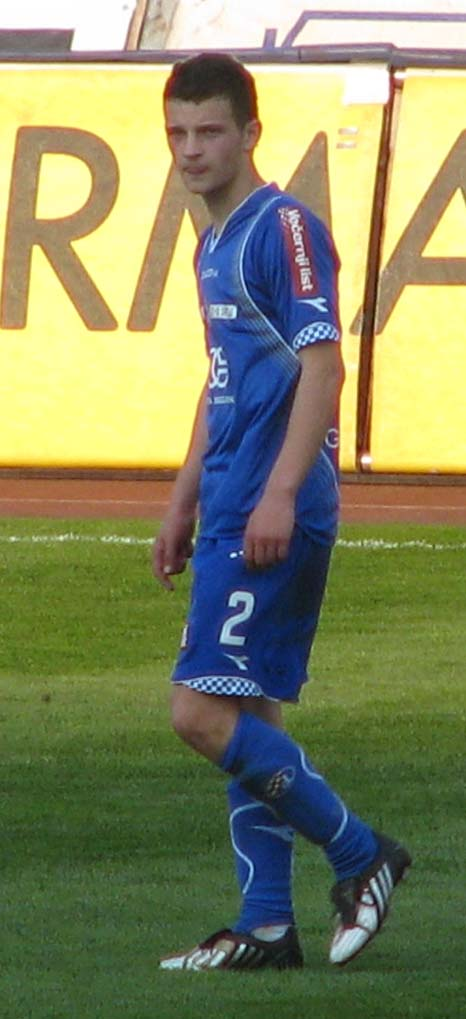
- Tomečak with Dinamo Zagreb in 2009

Personal information
- Date of birth: 7 December 1989 (age 36)
- Place of birth: Zagreb, SR Croatia, Yugoslavia
- Height: 1.76 m (5 ft 9 in)
- Positions: Right-back; winger

Team information
- Current team: Rudeš
- Number: 30

Senior career*
Years	Team	Apps	(Gls)
2007–2013	Dinamo Zagreb	74	(12)
2007–2009	→ Lokomotiva (loan)	47	(4)
2013–2015	Rijeka	65	(6)
2015–2016	Dnipro Dnipropetrovsk	9	(0)
2016–2017	Al-Nassr	26	(2)
2017–2018	Mechelen	9	(0)
2018–2019	Club Brugge	8	(1)
2019–2022	Rijeka	71	(3)
2022	→ Pafos (loan)	13	(0)
2022–2023	Lokomotiva	6	(0)
2023	Gorica	17	(0)
2023–	Rudeš	67	(2)

International career
2007	Croatia U18	4	(0)
2007–2008	Croatia U19	7	(0)
2008–2009	Croatia U20	2	(0)
2009–2010	Croatia U21	7	(0)
2014	Croatia	1	(0)
- * Club domestic league appearances and goals as of 16 June 2026

Ivan Tomečak (pronounced [ˈiʋan tɔmɛˈtʃaːk]; born 7 December 1989) is a Croatian professional footballer who plays for Rudeš. He is usually deployed as a right full-back, but is often used as a right winger or left full-back.

== Club career ==
=== Dinamo Zagreb ===
==== Loan to Lokomotiva ====
On 14 August 2007, Tomečak joined Croatian third-tier club Lokomotiva on an 18-month loan spell. He played in almost every match of 2007–08 season and helped Lokomotiva win the promotion to Druga HNL. In 2008–09 season he featured in all 15 of Lokomotiva's league matches before his loan finished.

==== Return to Dinamo Zagreb ====
Tomečak returned from loan on 1 January 2009 and has played an important part in Dinamo's 2008–09 championship title. His debut came on 1 March 2009 in a home match against Slaven Belupo, which Dinamo won 1–0. On 5 April 2009, he scored his first ever goal for Dinamo Zagreb, entering the match in 74th minute against Cibalia and scoring two crucial goals in Dinamo's 4–3 away win. He also played in both legs of 2009 Croatian Cup finals which Dinamo won third time consecutively, defeating Hajduk Split 4–3 after penalty shootout. With Dinamo Zagreb, Tomečak has won two consecutive domestic league titles, making a total of 30 league appearances for the club during the two seasons following his return. He also made his debut in the European competitions on 21 July 2009 in a 2009–10 UEFA Champions League match against Pyunik Yerevan which Dinamo Zagreb won 3–0.

At the start of the 2010–11 season, Tomečak won his fourth honour with Dinamo Zagreb, as the club won the 2010 Croatian Supercup.

On 22 November 2011, Tomečak scored Dinamo's second goal in the 2011–12 UEFA Champions League, netting a header in Dinamo's 6–2 away loss to Real Madrid at the Santiago Bernabéu.

=== Rijeka ===
On 7 June 2013, Tomečak signed a three-year contract with HNK Rijeka. He scored on his official debut for the club on 12 July 2013, opening the score in the 16th minute of a league match against NK Istra 1961. He immediately established himself as a regular starter both in Prva HNL and Europe. On 7 May 2014, Tomečak scored the winning goal in Rijeka's away win at GNK Dinamo Zagreb in the first leg of the 2014 Croatian Football Cup Final.

=== Later years ===
On 31 August 2015, Tomečak signed a two-year contract with Ukrainian club Dnipro Dnipropetrovsk, for a fee of €1 million. However, his contract was terminated in July 2016 after the club faced financial difficulties.

Subsequently, Tomečak switched clubs and countries and signed for Saudi Arabian club Al-Nassr which was managed by fellow Croatian and former Dinamo Zagreb manager Zoran Mamić. In his only season with the Saudi club he scored three goals and gave five assists.

In August 2017, he moved to Belgian club KV Mechelen and penned a two-year contract.

In January 2018, Tomečak moved to Mechelen's league rivals Club Brugge KV signing a 3 1/2-year contract. The transfer fee was reported as €1 to 1.5 million

=== Return to Rijeka ===
On 5 February 2019 Tomečak signed for HNK Rijeka as a free agent.

== International career ==
Tomečak started his international career for Croatia with the friendly match for the under-18 team in a match against Poland under-18. He made three more friendly match appearances for the under-18 team before he debuted for the under-19 team on 18 September 2007 in a friendly match against Slovenia under-19. He made a total of seven appearances for the under-19 selection before debuting for the under-20 and under-21 teams. He made two appearances in friendly matches for the under-20 team throughout the 2009 and 2010. On 7 June 2009, Tomečak debuted for the under-21 team in a qualifying match against Cyprus under-21.

He made his senior debut on 12 November 2014 in a friendly match against Argentina in London, coming as a 71st-minute substitute for Hrvoje Milić.

== Career statistics ==
As of 18 December 2021

Appearances and goals by club, season and competition
Club	Season	League			Cup		Continental		Other		Total	
Club	Season	Division	Apps	Goals	Apps	Goals	Apps	Goals	Apps	Goals	Apps	Goals
Lokomotiva (loan)	2007–08	Croatian Third League	32	2	–	–	–	–	–	–	32	2
Lokomotiva (loan)	2008–09	Croatian Second League	15	2	–	–	–	–	–	–	15	2
Lokomotiva (loan)	Total		47	4	0	0	0	0	0	0	47	4
Dinamo Zagreb	2008–09	Croatian First League	13	4	3	0	–	–	–	–	16	4
Dinamo Zagreb	2009–10	Croatian First League	17	1	5	0	8	1	–	–	30	2
Dinamo Zagreb	2010–11	Croatian First League	22	4	6	2	4	0	–	–	32	6
Dinamo Zagreb	2011–12	Croatian First League	14	3	6	0	6	1	–	–	26	4
Dinamo Zagreb	2012–13	Croatian First League	8	0	1	0	1	0	–	–	10	0
Dinamo Zagreb	Total		74	12	21	2	19	2	0	0	114	15
Rijeka	2013–14	Croatian First League	27	2	4	1	10	0	–	–	41	3
Rijeka	2014–15	Croatian First League	33	4	3	1	11	0	1	0	48	5
Rijeka	2015–16	Croatian First League	5	0	–	–	1	0	–	–	6	0
Rijeka	2018–19	Croatian First League	2	0	1	0	–	–	–	–	3	0
Rijeka	2019–20	Croatian First League	23	2	3	0	2	0	1	0	29	2
Rijeka	2020–21	Croatian First League	32	0	3	0	8	1	–	–	43	1
Rijeka	2021–22	Croatian First League	14	1	1	0	6	0	–	–	21	1
Rijeka	Total		136	9	15	2	38	1	2	0	191	12
Dnipro	2015–16	Ukrainian Premier League	9	0	–	–	4	0	–	–	13	0
Al-Nassr FC	2016–17	Saudi Professional League	26	2	2	0	–	–	–	–	28	2
Mechelen	2017–18	Belgian First Division A	9	0	–	–	–	–	–	–	9	0
Club Brugge	2017–18	Belgian First Division A	5	1	1	0	–	–	–	–	6	1
Club Brugge	2018–19	Belgian First Division A	3	0	0	0	0	0	–	–	4	0
Career total			310	28	39	4	61	3	2	0	412	35

== Honours ==
Lokomotiva

- Croatian Third League Promotion: 2007-08

Dinamo Zagreb

- Croatian First League : 2008–09, 2009–10, 2010–11, 2011–12, 2012–13
- Croatian Cup: 2008–09, 2010–11, 2011–12
- Croatian Super Cup: 2010

Rijeka

- Croatian Cup: 2013–14, 2018–19, 2019–20
- Croatian Super Cup: 2014

Club Brugge

- Belgian First Division A: 2017-18
- Belgian Super Cup: 2018
