= 2011–12 Croatian Football Cup =

Tournament details
- Country: Croatia
- Teams: 48

Final positions
- Champions: Dinamo Zagreb (12th title)
- Runners-up: Osijek

Tournament statistics
- Matches played: 54
- Goals scored: 165 (3.06 per match)
- Top goal scorer: 7 players (3)

The 2011–12 Croatian Football Cup was the twenty-first season of Croatia's football knockout competition. The defending champions were Dinamo Zagreb, having won their 11th title the previous year by defeating Varaždin in the final.

The cup kicked off with the single-legged preliminary round which was played on 24 August 2011. Most of the top flight clubs entered the competition in the following round, scheduled on 21 September 2011, with the exception of Istra 1961, Karlovac, RNK Split and Zadar, as their cup coefficient (determined by their cup record over the last five seasons) was too low to skip the preliminary round. In addition, Lučko and Lokomotiva, two of the top level clubs, failed to qualify for the competition.

== Calendar ==
Round	Date(s)	Number of fixtures	Clubs	New entries this round
Preliminary round	24 August 2011	16	48 → 32	none
First round	21 September 2011	16	32 → 16	16
Second round	26 October 2011	8	16 → 8	none
Quarter-finals	23 and 30 November 2011	8	8 → 4	none
Semi-finals	4 and 18 April 2012	4	4 → 2	none
Final	2 and 8 May 2012	2	2 → 1	none

== Preliminary round ==
The draw for the preliminary round was held on 2 August 2011 with matches scheduled on 24 August 2011. This round consists of 16 single-legged fixtures. A total of 32 clubs entered the preliminary round: 21 regional cup winners organised at the county level and 11 regional cup finalists (from the top 11 counties with the greatest number of registered football clubs) with the exception of Međimurje.

Tie no	Home team	Score	Away team
1	Slatina	2–3	Podravac Virje
2	Mladost Petrinja	3–1	Novalja
3	Karlovac	4–1	Dinamo Palovec
4	Belišće	2–2 (2–4 p)	Rudeš
5	Strmec	0–1	Graničar Laze
6	Vrbovec	2–0	Moslavina
7	Krka Lozovac	1–2	BSK Bijelo Brdo
8	Istra 1961	7–0	Mladost Ždralovi
9^{*}	Rudar Labin	5–1	Slavija Pleternica
10	Jadran Gunja	4–3	Zmaj Blato
11	Plitvica	2–3 (aet)	Opatija
12	Fruškogorac	3–1	Rudar 47
13^{*}	Marsonia 1909	1–2	RNK Split
14^{*}	Zadar	2–1	Dugopolje
15	Radnik Sesvete	3–0	Međimurje
16	Radoboj	3–0	Koprivnica

* Match played on 23 August.

== First round ==
First round proper consisted of 16 single-legged matches, with 16 winners of the preliminary round joined by 16 clubs with the highest cup coefficients (including 10 out of the remaining 12 top level clubs, excluding Lučko and Lokomotiva, whose cup coefficients were too low to enter competition). The draw for the first round was held on 29 August, where the club with the lowest cup coefficient hosts the one with the highest and so on. Matches were played on 20 and 21 September 2011. By the mutual agreement of Jadran Gunja and Hajduk Split, their fixture was moved to 15 September.

Tie no	Home team	Score	Away team
1^{*}	Radoboj	0–5	Dinamo Zagreb
2	Jadran Gunja	1–5	Hajduk Split
3	Graničar Laze	0–4	Slaven Belupo
4^{*}	Podravac Virje	0–0 (2–4 p)	Varaždin
5^{*}	Mladost Petrinja	0–7	NK Zagreb
6^{*}	Fruškogorac	1–3	Cibalia
7	Radnik Sesvete	2–0	Šibenik
8	BSK Bijelo Brdo	1–2	Rijeka
9	Vrbovec	0–1	Inter Zaprešić
10^{*}	Opatija	0–1	Osijek
11	Rudeš	2–1	Pomorac
12	RNK Split	5–0	Segesta
13	Rudar Labin	0–1	Istra 1961
14	Vinogradar	1–0	Konavljanin
15	Zadar	1–1 (8–9 p)	Karlovac
16	HAŠK	2–1	Hrvatski Dragovoljac

* Match played on 20 September.

== Second round ==
The second round was contested by 16 winners from the first round in eight single-legged fixtures scheduled for 26 October 2011. It was the last stage of the competition employing the single leg format as from the quarter-finals onwards all fixtures were double-legged events.

Tie no	Home team	Score	Away team
1^{*}	HAŠK	0–4	Dinamo Zagreb
2	Hajduk Split	3–2	Karlovac
3	Vinogradar	2–1	Slaven Belupo
4^{*}	Varaždin	0–1 (a.e.t.)	Istra 1961
5^{*}	NK Zagreb	2–1	RNK Split
6	Rudeš	0–1	Cibalia
7^{*}	Osijek	2–1	Radnik Sesvete
8^{*}	Rijeka	1–0	Inter Zaprešić

* Match played on 25 October.

== Quarter-finals ==
The eight clubs remaining in the competition after the second round were paired for the quarter-finals. From the quarter-finals onwards the ties will be played in a two-legged format. The draw was held on 28 October, first legs were played on 23 November and second legs on 30 November 2011. The tie between Dinamo Zagreb and Istra 1961 was postponed for the following year due to Dinamo's participation in European competitions. As the severe weather postponed the first round of the spring season, both clubs agreed to play the first leg at that free slot in Pula due to better weather conditions. Dinamo Zagreb were hosts in Pula and Istra 1961 in Zagreb, as the order of legs could not be reversed.

Team 1	Agg.	Team 2	1st leg	2nd leg
Hajduk Split	1–1 (4–5 p)	NK Zagreb	1–0	0–1
Dinamo Zagreb	2–2 (4–3 p)	Istra 1961	1–1	1–1
Rijeka	1–4	Osijek	1–2	0–2
Cibalia	3–2	Vinogradar	2–1	1–1

== Semi-finals ==
3 April 2012
17:00

Osijek	3–0	Cibalia
Maglica 28', 35'; Vrgoč 77'	Report (in Croatian)

Stadion Gradski vrt, Osijek
Attendance: 4,000
Referee: Goran Gabrilo (Split)
18 April 2012
18:00

Cibalia	2–1	Osijek
Vitaić 40'; Tomić 50'	Report (in Croatian)	Šorša 58'

Stadion HNK Cibalia, Vinkovci
Attendance: 3,000
Referee: Zlatko Šimčić (Koprivnica)

Osijek won 4–2 on aggregate

4 April 2012
17:30

Dinamo Zagreb	1–1	NK Zagreb
Badelj 29'	Report (in Croatian)	Mitrović 76'

Stadion Maksimir, Zagreb
Attendance: 3,000
Referee: Igor Križarić (Čakovec)
17 April 2012
18:00

NK Zagreb	1–2	Dinamo Zagreb
Medić 33'	Report (in Croatian)	Leko 78'; Krstanović 80'

Stadion Kranjčevićeva, Zagreb
Attendance: 3,000
Referee: Ivan Bebek (Rijeka)

Dinamo Zagreb won 3–2 on aggregate

== Final ==
=== First leg ===
2 May 2012
19:00

Osijek	0–0	Dinamo Zagreb
	Report (in Croatian)

Stadion Gradski vrt, Osijek
Attendance: 8,000
Referee: Vlado Svilokos (Sisak)

=== Second leg ===
9 May 2012
18:00

Dinamo Zagreb	3–1	Osijek
Kovačić 51'; Bećiraj 63'; Ibáñez 90+1'	Report (in Croatian)	Vrsaljko 69' (o.g.)

Stadion Maksimir, Zagreb
Attendance: 10,000
Referee: Ivan Bebek (Rijeka)

Dinamo Zagreb won 3–1 on aggregate

== See also ==
- 2011–12 Croatian First Football League
- 2011–12 Croatian Second Football League
