= Sammir =

Croatian footballer (born 1987)

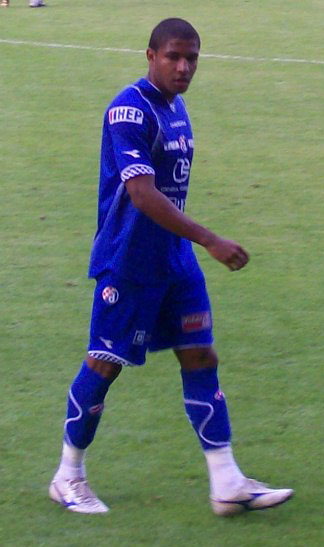
- Sammir playing for Dinamo Zagreb in 2008

Personal information
- Full name: Jorge Sammir Cruz Campos
- Date of birth: 23 April 1987 (age 39)
- Place of birth: Itabuna, Brazil
- Height: 1.78 m (5 ft 10 in)
- Position: Attacking midfielder

Team information
- Current team: Apotheos FC

Youth career
- 1998–2001: Atlético Mineiro
- 2001–2005: Atlético Paranaense

Senior career*
Years	Team	Apps	(Gls)
2004–2006	Atlético Paranaense	0	(0)
2005	→ Ferroviária (loan)		
2005–2006	→ Paulista (loan)		
2006–2007	Venda Nova		
2006	→ São Caetano (loan)		
2007	→ Dinamo Zagreb (loan)	11	(1)
2007–2014	Dinamo Zagreb	160	(45)
2014–2015	Getafe	32	(1)
2015–2016	Jiangsu Suning	43	(3)
2016	→ Hangzhou Greentown (loan)	13	(3)
2017	Dinamo Zagreb	12	(1)
2017	Wuhan Zall	13	(2)
2019	Sport Recife	12	(1)
2019–2021	Lokomotiva	23	(1)
2026–	Apotheos FC	0	(0)

International career
2004	Brazil U17		
2005	Brazil U18		
2012–2014	Croatia	7	(0)
- * Club domestic league appearances and goals

Jorge Sammir Cruz Campos (born 23 April 1987), commonly known as Sammir, is a professional footballer who plays as an attacking midfielder for USL League Two club Apotheos FC. Born in Brazil, he has been capped seven times for the Croatia national team and was selected for the 2014 FIFA World Cup.

== Club career ==
=== Brazil ===
Born in Itabuna, Bahia, Sammir joined Atlético Paranaense's youth setup in 2001, aged 14, after a brief period at Atlético Mineiro. He was promoted to the first-team in February 2004, but failed to make any appearances for the Brazilian club and was subsequently loaned out to Ferroviária.

In December 2005 Sammir joined Paulista also in a temporary deal. After struggling to find his place, he returned to Furacão in April 2006, and was released in August.

In September 2006 Sammir joined Venda Nova, a businessman club, being immediately loaned out to São Caetano. He appeared regularly for the side during his two-month spell.

=== Dinamo Zagreb ===
On 6 November 2006 Sammir joined Dinamo Zagreb on loan until the end of the season. He made his debut for the club on 17 March 2007 in a league match against Rijeka.

At the end of the season, Sammir had made eleven league appearances for the club and scored against Slaven Belupo. He also made four appearances in the 2006–07 Croatian Cup. In his first season with the club, Sammir had already won the league and cup title, which was the first of the club's three consecutive doubles they won from 2007 to 2009.

==== 2007–08 season ====
In the 2007–08 season, his move to Dinamo Zagreb was made permanent as Dinamo Zagreb paid €1.4 million to his former club according to media. Sammir made his European football debut, featuring in all of the club's UEFA Cup and Champions League matches. He played in the position of right midfielder, swapping positions with the team captain Luka Modrić, playing on the other side of the pitch. It was the club's second season that they had won both the domestic league and cup, Sammir participating in 24 league games, scoring four goals, and 4 cup matches. He made a total of 38 appearances for the club and scored five goals during the course of the season.

==== 2008–09 season ====
After the departure of Luka Modrić, Sammir was given the number 10 shirt. The club repeated the success from the previous two seasons, clinching the double again in the 2008–09 season. He missed only one league match of the 33 rounds played, scoring 8 goals in the process. He made eleven appearances in UEFA competitions and made five more in the Croatian Cup. Overall making a total of 44 appearances and scoring eleven goals.

==== 2009–10 season ====
On 16 August, at the start of the 2009–10 season, Sammir scored his first hat–trick for Dinamo in a 5–0 home victory against NK Osijek, converting two penalties and a free kick. The club failed to defend the cup title on that occasion, but won their fifth consecutive league title. Sammir helped with 26 league appearances and five goals. He made six appearances in the 2009–10 Croatian Cup, and featured in all of the club's European matches, playing in all four of the 2009–10 UEFA Champions League matches and in all eight 2009–10 UEFA Europa League matches. Overall, he made 46 appearances and scored six goals for the club.

==== 2010–11 season ====
At the start of the 2010–11 season Sammir won his first Croatian Supercup with the club as they defeated Hajduk Split by a score 1–0, captain Igor Bišćan scoring the winning goal. Sammir has scored 17 goals in his 28 appearances†. In European competitions he managed to score 7 goals in 12 European matches.

==== 2011–12 season ====
The Brazilian started the 2011–2012 season, scoring against Cibalia Vinkovci in the Prva HNL, and also the winning goal in the first leg of the Champions League 3rd Qualifying Round tie in a 2–1 win against HJK Helsinki. He scored two goals and setting up another in a 4–1 win against Malmö FF in the first leg of the Champions League Play-off. He appeared in 5 Dinamo games in group stage, playing against Real Madrid, Olympique Lyonnais and AFC Ajax. He continued to appear regularly for the first team in the Prva HNL and the Champions League group stage, netting 8 goals in 32 appearances in all.

==== 2012–13 season ====
In 2012–2013 season, he scored 8 goals in 7 matches, 6 of which were from the penalty kicks in Prva HNL. He appeared in every match of UEFA Champion's league qualify round, except a guest match against NK Maribor. In May 2011, he was partying at clubs just a few days before the match, which aggravated GNK Dinamo Zagreb's coach Ante Čačić, resulting in club suspension of him and Jerko Leko.. He apologised, rejoined the team, and appeared in all 6 of Dinamo Zagreb matches in group stage of 2012–13 UEFA Champions League.

=== Getafe ===
On 31 January 2014 Sammir signed a three-and-a-half-year with La Liga's Getafe CF. He made his debut in the competition on 1 March, coming on as a second-half substitute in a 0–0 home draw against RCD Espanyol.

Sammir appeared in eight matches as the Madrid outskirts team narrowly avoided relegation. On 24 August 2014 he scored his first goal for the Azulones, but in a 1–3 loss at Celta de Vigo.

=== Jiangsu Sainty ===
On 27 February 2015 Sammir moved to China, joining Jiangsu Sainty in a three-year deal. On 15 July 2016, he was loaned to Hangzhou Greentown for half-year.

=== Sport Recife ===
In February 2019, Sammir joined Sport Recife, but was released by the club after only few months.

=== Lokomotiva ===
In August 2019, he returned once again to Prva HNL, signing for Lokomotiva. On 1 March 2021, Lokomotiva coach Jerko Leko revealed that Sammir and his teammate Nikica Jelavić decided to retire from professional football and that the club respected their decisions.

== International career ==
After appearing for Brazil at Bunder-17 and under-18 levels, Sammir expressed his desire to play for the Croatia national team after obtaining a Croatian passport. On 27 September 2012, Sammir was called to play for Croatia for the games against Wales and Macedonia. He made his debut on 12 October 2012 as a 65th-minute substitute for Nikica Jelavić in the match against Macedonia, a 2–1 win.

He was selected for Croatia's squad for the 2014 FIFA World Cup in his native Brazil, as one of two Brazilian-born players in the squad alongside Eduardo. Neither played in the opening match against the hosts, but Sammir started the second match, a 4–0 win over Cameroon. He played 72 minutes before being taken off for Mateo Kovačić. After the tournament ended, he did not receive any future call-ups for the national team.

== Career statistics ==
Appearances and goals by club, season and competition
Club	Season	League			Cup		Continental		Other		Total	
Club	Season	Division	Apps	Goals	Apps	Goals	Apps	Goals	Apps	Goals	Apps	Goals
Dinamo Zagreb (loan)	2006–07	Croatian First Football League	11	1	4	0	0	0	0	0	15	1
Dinamo Zagreb	2007–08	Croatian First Football League	24	4	4	0	10	1	—		38	5
Dinamo Zagreb	2008–09	Croatian First Football League	32	8	5	3	11	1	—		48	12
Dinamo Zagreb	2009–10	Croatian First Football League	26	5	6	1	12	1	—		44	7
Dinamo Zagreb	2010–11	Croatian First Football League	22	10	5	2	12	7	1	0	40	19
Dinamo Zagreb	2011–12	Croatian First Football League	21	5	5	0	12	3	—		38	8
Dinamo Zagreb	2012–13	Croatian First Football League	28	13	1	0	11	0	—		40	13
Dinamo Zagreb	2013–14	Croatian First Football League	7	0	0	0	6	0	0	0	13	0
Dinamo Zagreb	Total		160	45	26	6	74	13	1	0	261	64
Getafe	2013–14	La Liga	9	0	0	0	—		—		9	0
Getafe	2014–15	La Liga	23	1	3	0	—		—		26	1
Getafe	Total		32	1	3	0	—		—		35	1
Jiangsu Suning	2015	Chinese Super League	28	2	5	2	—		—		33	4
Jiangsu Suning	2016	Chinese Super League	15	1	1	0	0	0	1	0	16	1
Jiangsu Suning	Total		43	3	6	2	0	0	1	0	50	5
Hangzhou Greentown (loan)	2016	Chinese Super League	13	3	0	0	—		—		13	3
Dinamo Zagreb	2016–17	Croatian First Football League	12	1	2	1	—		—		14	2
Wuhan Zall	2017	China League One	13	2	—		—		—		13	3
Dinamo Zagreb	2016–17	Croatian First Football League	12	1	2	1	—		—		14	2
Recife	2019	Série B	12	1	—		—		1	0	13	1
Lokomotiva	2019–20	Croatian First Football League	14	0	2	0	—		—		16	0
Lokomotiva	2020–21	Croatian First Football League	9	1	1	0	2	0	—		12	1
Lokomotiva	Total		23	1	3	0	2	0	—		28	1
Career total			319	58	44	9	76	13	3	0	442	81

== Honours ==
Dinamo Zagreb

- Croatian First League : 2006-07, 2007–08, 2008–09, 2009–10, 2010–11, 2011–12, 2012–13
- Croatian Cup: 2006–07, 2007–08, 2008–09, 2010–11, 2011–12
- Croatian Super Cup: 2010, 2013

Jiangsu Sainty

- Chinese FA Cup: 2015

Individual

- Prva HNL Player of the Year: 2010
- HNL's Footballer of the Year: 2010, 2012
- Football Oscar Best Prva HNL player: 2013
- Football Oscar Prva HNL Team of the Year: 2013
- Croatian First Football League: top assist provider 2008-09
