= Dominik Glavina =

Croatian footballer (born 1992)

Personal information
- Date of birth: 6 December 1992 (age 33)
- Place of birth: Čakovec, Croatia
- Height: 1.82 m (5 ft 11 1/2 in)
- Position: Forward

Team information
- Current team: Bjelovar
- Number: 7

Youth career
- 2002–2007: Čakovec
- 2007–2010: Varteks

Senior career*
Years	Team	Apps	(Gls)
2010–2012	Varaždin	39	(9)
2012–2013	Beitar Jerusalem	26	(3)
2013–2014	Slaven Belupo	29	(6)
2015–2016	Inter Zaprešić	37	(3)
2016–2017	Rudar Velenje	36	(16)
2018–2019	Universitatea Craiova	9	(0)
2019	Enosis Neon Paralimni	3	(0)
2019–2021	Varaždin	23	(1)
2021–2022	Međimurje		
2022–	Bjelovar		

International career
2007	Croatia U15	1	(0)
2008	Croatia U16	2	(0)
2008–2009	Croatia U17	5	(0)
2009–2010	Croatia U18	7	(0)
2010–2011	Croatia U19	2	(1)
2012	Croatia U20	1	(1)
2010	Croatia U21	1	(0)
- * Club domestic league appearances and goals as of 21 July 2019

Dominik Glavina (born 6 December 1992) is a Croatian footballer who plays as a forward for Bjelovar.

He is the grandson of the actor Ratko Glavina.

== Club career ==
Glavina came up through the NK Varteks youth system, and played for their U-19 squad. The Varteks lost their main sponsor, Varteks clothing factory, in 2010, so changed its 52-year-old name to NK Varaždin; this was the name when Glavina made his senior debut with the club in 2010. He started in both games of the 2011–12 UEFA Europa League qualifiers. During the first leg against Lusitanos, he scored Varaždin's third goal. After playing with six other clubs over the years, Glavina returned to the city of Varaždin to once again play with a club based at its Stadion Varteks, when he signed with NK Varaždin in 2019 – albeit a club not associated with the club from the start of his career, as the original "Varteks / Varaždin" never recovered from losing its sponsor, stopped paying its players, then went bankrupt and folded in 2015.

== Honours ==
Universitatea Craiova

- Cupa României: 2017–18
- Supercupa României: Runner-up 2018
