= Nikola Šafarić =

Croatian footballer (born 1981)

Personal information
- Full name: Nikola Šafarić
- Date of birth: 11 March 1981 (age 45)
- Place of birth: Čakovec, SR Croatia, Yugoslavia
- Height: 1.66 m (5 ft 5 in)
- Position: Midfielder

Team information
- Current team: Varaždin (manager)

Youth career
- Venera Sveti Juraj na Bregu
- Čakovec

Senior career*
Years	Team	Apps	(Gls)
1998–2007	Varteks	195	(40)
2007–2008	Rijeka	34	(2)
2008–2010	Slaven Belupo	51	(3)
2010–2011	Varaždin	47	(6)
2011–2013	Kaposvári	43	(1)
2013–2015	Zavrč	50	(5)
2015	Inter Zaprešić	13	(1)
2015–2016	Međimurje	28	(9)
2016–2017	Varaždin	0	(0)

International career
2004–2006	Croatia	3	(0)

Managerial career
- 2023–: Varaždin
- * Club domestic league appearances and goals

Nikola Šafarić (born 11 March 1981) is a Croatian football manager and former footballer who played as midfielder. He current works as sporting director and manager of NK Varaždin.

== Club career ==
=== Early years ===
In 1998, Šafarić started his football career in Varaždin for Varteks as a young 17-year-old midfielder. He quickly established himself as irreplaceable in the Varteks team. Before his 20th birthday he has already played around 40 league games for Varteks and scoring several goals in the process.

=== Best years with Varteks ===
Šafarić became a team regular for Varteks starting in the 2002–03 season. In the next 5 seasons, he scored 32 goals in the domestic league and was he was appointed as team's captain. In an interview, Šafarić said he "plays best as a defensive midfielder."

=== Subsequent teams ===
In the beginning of the 2007–08 season, Nikola Šafarić was sold to Rijeka. In Rijeka, Nikola was welcomed by many as a great acquisition. He instantly "grabbed" first team position and was one of the team's best players by scoring two goals and adding three more assists, which helped Rijeka to finish at the fourth place in the Prva HNL.

On 31 August 2008, Šafarić signed a 2-year contract with Slaven Belupo.

He returned to the Varteks for the 2010–2011 season. Before the season started, the club lost its main sponsorship, the Varteks clothing factory, and changed its 52-year-old name to NK Varaždin. The club immediately fell into financial difficulties, and would be expelled from the top-level Prava HNL the following season, when it stopped paying its players. Šafarić avoided this, having signed a two-year contract with Kaposvári in 2011, but this will come to play later in Šafarić's career.

Šafarić signed a two-year contract with Zavrč in 2013. In January 2015, he signed for the Druga HNL outfit NK Inter Zaprešić.

Šafarić signed with Međimurje for the 2015–2016 season, then returned to the city of Varaždin for the 2016–17 season. His earlier club, NK Varaždin, had declared bankruptcy and folded in 2015, but Šafarić had signed with a different NK Varaždin, unassociated with the earlier team. This club had formed in 2012, as Varaždin ŠN, than changed to NK Varaždin when the bankrupt team discarded the name.

== International career ==
Nikola Šafarić was a member of every Croatia national football team categories (U17, U19, U21, senior team). That's why he was predicted a great international club career. But, unfortunately, up to this date Nikola has made only three appearances for Croatia national football team. His international debut came against Israel in the 1–0 friendly win at Varaždin on 18 August 2004. His second and third international cap came on 2006 Carlsberg Cup in Hong Kong on which Croatia finished third.
