= Filip Škvorc =

Croatian footballer

Filip Škoda
Personal information
- Date of birth: 22 July 1991 (age 35)
- Place of birth: Hohenems, Austria
- Height: 1.87 m (6 ft 1 1/2 in)
- Position: Forward

Team information
- Current team: NK Bratstvo Savska Ves

Youth career
- Čakovec
- 2004–2010: Varteks

Senior career*
Years	Team	Apps	(Gls)
2010–2011	Varaždin	33	(9)
2011–2016	Dinamo Zagreb	0	(0)
2011–2013	→ Lokomotiva (loan)	28	(4)
2014	→ Sesvete (loan)	7	(1)
2014–2015	→ Dinamo Zagreb B	11	(4)
2015	→ Zavrč (loan)	1	(0)
2015–2016	→ Gorica (loan)	28	(4)
2016–2017	Hrvatski Dragovoljac	11	(1)
2017	Mura 05		
2017–2018	Međimurje		
2019	Lučko	13	(4)
2019-2020	USV Allerheiligen	15	(11)
2020	→ Kapfenberger SV (loan)	11	(2)
2020-2021	NK Rudar Mursko Sredisce		
2022	Međimurje		
2022-	NK Bratstvo Savska Ves		

International career
2009	Croatia U18	2	(0)
2011	Croatia U21	1	(1)
- * Club domestic league appearances and goals as of 17:33, 22 November 2019 (UTC)

Filip Škvorc (born 22 July 1991 in Hohenems) is a Croatian football striker who plays for NK Bratstvo Savska Ves.

== Career ==
From 2004 to 2010, Škvorc played with the Varteks youth system. He debuted with the club's senior squad in 2010, just after it changed its name to NK Varaždin. The club was financially troubled, having lost its main sponsor (the Varteks clothing factory), and had to miss some salary payments to its players. After successfully having his contract with Varaždin terminated, due to unpaid wages, in June 2011, Škvorc signed a five-year contract with Dinamo Zagreb and was loaned to Lokomotiva. He later had spells in the Austrian third and second tier with SV Allerheiligen and Kapfenberger SV.
