= NK Varaždin (1931–2015) =

Croatian football club

VŠNK Varaždin
- Full name: Varaždinski športski nogometni klub Varaždin
- Nicknames: Krojači (Tailors); Bumbari (Bumblebees)
- Founded: 3 June 1931; 95 years ago as NK Slavija
- Dissolved: 2015; 11 years ago
- Ground: Stadion Varteks
- Capacity: 8,818
Home colours	Away colours

Varaždinski športski nogometni klub Varaždin (English: Varaždin Football Club), commonly referred to as VŠNK Varaždin or simply Varaždin, was a Croatian football club based in the city of Varaždin in the north of the country. For the majority of its existence between 1958 and 2010, the club was known as NK Varteks, honouring the name of its principal sponsor, a local textile factory.

The club spent its entire history in the Yugoslav era in lower-tier divisions. However, after Croatia's independence in 1991 and the formation of the Croatian First Football League Varteks established themselves as one of the stronger sides in the new national top level. Varteks spent the next 21 seasons in Croatia's top league, finishing third three times, and reaching the national cup final on six occasions.

During this period, the club also regularly played European football, with their biggest successes in the 1998–99 season, when they reached the quarter-final of the UEFA Cup Winners' Cup, and in the 2001–02 season, when they knocked out England's Aston Villa in the first round of the UEFA Cup.

By the early 2010s both the club and the factory were in dire financial problems. In 2010 the club dropped the Varteks name, which led to angry fans forming their own club, the new NK Varteks, in 2011. In 2012 the club, now called Varaždin, were relegated from the league, and in 2013 they were suspended and sent to the third level. They languished there for two more seasons before finally folding in 2015.

The club played their home matches at the Stadion Varteks, which was renovated through the years and reached an all-seating capacity of 10,800 (further renovated to seat 8,800 by sometime before 2021).

== History ==
The club was founded on 3 June 1931 under the name of NK Slavija and existed under this name until 1941. During World War II, the club temporarily suspended operations and was then reorganised under the name of NK Tekstilac in 1945. The name NK Varteks was given to the club in 1958, to honour its main sponsor, the Varteks clothing factory (portmanteau of Varaždin Textile). In June 2010, when the Varteks factory did not renew its sponsorship, the club changed its name to NK Varaždin.

The club's first significant success came in 1938 when they qualified to participate in the premier league of the Kingdom of Yugoslavia. In SFR Yugoslavia, their biggest success was the advancement to the final of the Yugoslav Cup in 1961, but they lost the final game to Vardar Skopje from Macedonia.

In 1991, following the breakup of Yugoslavia and Croatia's independence, Croatian clubs withdrew from the Football Association of Yugoslavia, so Varteks was one of the 12 founding members of the new Croatian First Football League (Prva Liga), which operated under the auspices of the Croatian Football Federation (HNS).

The club did not win any Croatian national titles, but regularly placed near the top of the Prva Liga table and were also the runners-up in the Croatian Football Cup five times. In the spring of 1999, they had a significant international success when they advanced to the quarterfinals of the now defunct UEFA Cup Winners' Cup, where they held opponent Real Mallorca to a scoreless draw at home before losing the second-leg away match 3–1, and were eliminated from competition. They also attracted some international attention in 2001, when they eliminated Aston Villa from the UEFA Cup on away goals.

Serious financial troubles forced NK Varaždin into a period of bankruptcy, which eventually led to the suspension of the club by Croatian Football Federation before a scheduled 24 February 2012 match of the 2011–12 Prva Liga season. The club returned for its next five matches, but was suspended again before its 31 March 2012 match. Per the rules of the Federation, missing two league games in a season, even those due to suspension, meant that the club was immediately relegated to the lowest football level possible of the Croatian football league system, being the seventh-tier Third League of Varaždin County. The suspension was lifted in August 2013 and the club re-entered in the third-tier Croatian Third Football League.

== Seasons ==
Logo as NK Varteks

Season	League									Cup	European competitions		Top league scorer	
Season	Division	P	W	D	L	F	A	Pts	Pos	Cup	European competitions		Player	Goals
1992	1. HNL	22	7	6	9	32	25	20	8th	DNQ			Igor Cvitanović	9
1992–93	1. HNL	30	10	9	11	38	47	29	7th	QF			Mirza Golubica	8
1993–94	1. HNL	34	16	9	9	51	31	41	5th	QF			Davor Vugrinec	17
1994–95	1. HNL	30	11	10	9	35	27	43	6th	SF			Davor Vugrinec	8
1995–96	1. HNL	32	18	7	7	44	26	61	3rd	RU			Davor Vugrinec	17
1996–97	1. HNL	30	12	6	12	34	35	42	6th	QF	Cup Winners' Cup	R1	Davor Vugrinec	13
1997–98	1. HNL	32	10	8	14	34	44	38	10th	RU			Marko Topić	7
1998–99	1. HNL	32	12	4	16	55	57	40	5th	QF	Cup Winners' Cup	QF	Miljenko Mumlek	13
1999–2000	1. HNL	33	10	10	13	32	44	40	7th	QF	Intertoto Cup	R3	Damir Mužek, Vioresin Sinani	5
2000–01	1. HNL	32	12	9	11	56	56	45	4th	QF			Saša Bjelanović, Veldin Karić	12
2001–02	1. HNL	30	17	6	7	58	40	57	4th	RU	UEFA Cup	R2	Saša Bjelanović	17
2002–03	1. HNL	32	18	3	11	52	38	57	3rd	SF	UEFA Cup	R1	Veldin Karić	10
2003–04	1. HNL	32	9	11	12	33	42	38	5th	RU	UEFA Cup	R1	Nikola Šafarić	7
2004–05	1. HNL	32	14	3	15	53	50	45	5th	SF			Nedim Halilović	9
2005–06	1. HNL	32	15	2	15	51	48	47	3rd	RU	Intertoto Cup	R3	Leon Benko	14
2006–07	1. HNL	33	12	6	15	49	62	42	8th	R1	UEFA Cup	QR1	Enes Novinić	15
2007–08	1. HNL	33	11	7	15	46	53	40	7th	SF			Miljenko Mumlek	9
2008–09	1. HNL	33	10	5	18	41	55	35	10th	R2			Goran Mujanović	11
2009–10	1. HNL	30	9	9	12	36	43	36	10th	SF			Miljenko Mumlek	11
2010–11	1. HNL	30	9	9	12	32	38	36	11th	RU			Filip Škvorc	7
2011–12	1. HNL	24	2	3	19	16	52	8	16th	R2	UEFA Europa League	QR3	Dominik Glavina	5
2012–13	Club was suspended by Croatian Football Federation													
2013–14	3. HNL North	30	15	5	10	66	32	49	7th	PR			Marko Rog	17
2014–15	3. HNL East	30	10	9	11	42	39	39	11th	R2			Luka Ivanović	11

Key
League: P = Matches played; W = Matches won; D = Matches drawn; L = Matches lost; F = Goals for; A = Goals against; Pts = Points won; Pos = Final position;
Cup / Europe: PR = Preliminary round; QR = Qualifying round; R1 = First round; R2 = Second round; Group = Group stage; QF = Quarter-final; SF = Semi-final; RU = Runner-up; W = Competition won;

== European record ==
=== Summary ===
Competition	Pld	W	D	L	GF	GA	Last season played
UEFA Cup; UEFA Europa League	22	10	5	7	48	34	2011–12
UEFA Cup Winners' Cup	10	6	1	3	15	10	1998–99
UEFA Intertoto Cup	12	5	3	4	22	21	2005
Total	44	21	9	14	85	65	

Source: uefa.com, Last updated on 4 August 2011
Pld = Matches played; W = Matches won; D = Matches drawn; L = Matches lost; GF = Goals for; GA = Goals against. Defunct competitions indicated in italics.

=== By season ===
Season	Competition	Round	Opponent	Home	Away	Agg.
1996–97	Cup Winners' Cup	QR	Union Luxembourg	2–1	3–0	5–1
1996–97	Cup Winners' Cup	R1	(Russia) Lokomotiv Moscow	2–1	0–1	2–2 (a)
1998–99	Cup Winners' Cup	R1	(Slovenia) Rudar Velenje	1–0	1–0	2–0
1998–99	Cup Winners' Cup	R2	(Netherlands) Heerenveen	4–2 (aet)	1–2	5–4
1998–99	Cup Winners' Cup	QF	(Spain) Mallorca	0–0	1–3	1–3
1999–2000	Intertoto Cup	R1	(Belarus) Lokomotiv-96 Vitebsk	2–2	2–1	4–3
1999–2000	Intertoto Cup	R2	(Norway) Brann	3–0	0–3	3–3 (5–4 p)
1999–2000	Intertoto Cup	R3	(Russia) Rostselmash	1–2	1–0	2–2 (a)
2001–02	UEFA Cup	QR	(Liechtenstein) Vaduz	6–1	3–3	9–4
2001–02	UEFA Cup	R1	(England) Aston Villa	0–1	3–2	3–3 (a)
2001–02	UEFA Cup	R2	(Denmark) Brondby	3–1	0–5	3–6
2002–03	UEFA Cup	QR	(Republic of Ireland) Dundalk	5–0	4–0	9–0
2002–03	UEFA Cup	R1	(Denmark) Midtjylland	1–1	0–1	1–2
2003–04	UEFA Cup	QR	(Estonia) Levadia Tallinn	3–2	3–1	6–3
2003–04	UEFA Cup	R1	(Hungary) Debrecen	1–3	2–3	3–6
2005–06	Intertoto Cup	R1	(Albania) Dinamo Tirana	4–1	1–2	5–3
2005–06	Intertoto Cup	R2	(Finland) Inter Turku	4–3	2–2	6–5
2005–06	Intertoto Cup	R3	(France) Lens	1–1	1–4	2–5
2006–07	UEFA Cup	QR1	(Albania) KF Tirana	1–1	0–2	1–3
2011–12	Europa League	QR1	(Andorra) Lusitanos	5–1	1–0	6–1
2011–12	Europa League	QR2	(Moldova) Iskra-Stal	3–1	1–1	4–2
2011–12	Europa League	QR3	(Romania) Dinamo București	1–2	2–2	3–4

== Honours ==
- (Croatia) Croatian Football Cup:
  - Runners-up (6): 1995–96, 1997–98, 2001–02, 2003–04, 2005–06, 2010–11
- (Socialist Federal Republic of Yugoslavia) Yugoslav Cup:
  - Runners up (1): 1960–61
- (India) DCM Trophy:
  - Winners (1): 1993

=== Player records ===
- Most appearances in UEFA club competitions: 27 appearances
  - Miljenko Mumlek
- Top scorers in UEFA club competitions: 17 goals
  - Miljenko Mumlek

== Notable players ==
To appear in this section a player must have:

- Played at least 150 league games for the club;
- Scored at least 50 league goals for the club; or
- Played at least one international match for their national team while playing for NK Varaždin.

Years in brackets indicate their spells at the club.

- (Croatia) Zlatko Dalić (1992–1996, 1998–2000)
- (Croatia) Davor Vugrinec (1992–1997, 2010–2012)
- (Croatia) Samir Toplak (1988–1998, 2002–2005)
- (Croatia) Marijan Mrmić (1993–1996, 1998–1999, 2000)
- (Croatia) Miljenko Mumlek (1992–1999, 2000–2003, 2007–2010)
- (Croatia) Andrija Balajić (1992–1996, 1997–2000, 2001–2002, 2007–2010)
- (Croatia) Krunoslav Gregorić (1992–1999, 2002–2003)
- (Croatia) Dražen Madunović (1992, 1993–2001)
- (Croatia) Silvester Sabolčki (1998–2003)
- (Croatia) Mladen Posavec (1992–2000)
- (Croatia) Robert Težački (1992–1998, 1999–2001)

- (Croatia) Danijel Hrman (1997–2003, 2006–2007, 2007–2008)
- (Croatia) Veldin Karić (1997–2004)
- (Croatia) Nikola Šafarić (1998–2007, 2010–2011)
- (Croatia) Zoran Kastel (1998–2005)
- (Albania) Vioresin Sinani (1999–2001)
- (Bosnia and Herzegovina) Nedim Halilović (2001–2006)
- (Croatia) Leon Benko (2003–2006)
- (Croatia) Ivan Režić (1997–1998, 1999–2004)
- (Bosnia and Herzegovina) Marko Topić (1997–1998)
- (Albania) Devi Muka (2000–2002)
- (Croatia) Vladimir Vasilj (2004)
- (Croatia) Dražen Ladić (1980–1984)

== Managerial history ==
- (Croatia) Branko Ivanković (July 1991 – June 1995)
- (Croatia) Luka Bonačić (1995–1996)
- (Croatia) Dražen Besek (1998–1999)
- (Croatia) Luka Bonačić (December 1999 – April 2000)
- (Croatia) Branko Janžek (April 2000 – May 2000)
- (Croatia) Ivan Katalinić (May 2000 – April 2001)
- (Croatia) Branko Janžek (April 2001 – May 2002)
- (Croatia) Dražen Besek (May 2002 – September 2003)
- (Croatia) Miroslav Blažević (September 2003 – May 2005)

- (Croatia) Zlatko Dalić (May 2005 – May 2007)
- (Croatia) Josip Kuže (June 2007 – August 2007)
- (Croatia) Dražen Besek (August 2007 – December 2009)
- (Croatia) Damir Jagačić (January 2010 – March 2010)
- (Croatia) Samir Toplak (March 2010 – August 2011)
- (Austria) Tomica Kocijan (August 2011 – October 2011)
- (Croatia) Branko Janžek (October 2011 – July 2012)
- (Croatia) Ivica Solomun (July 2012 – January 2015)
