= 2010–11 HNK Hajduk Split season =

Hajduk Split
2010–11 season
- Chairman: Joško Svaguša (until 22 December 2010); Josip Grbić (from 22 December 2010 to 26 April 2011); Hrvoje Maleš (from 26 April 2011)
- Manager: Stanko Poklepović (until 28 October 2010); Goran Vučević (from 28 December 2010 to 16 April 2011); Ante Miše (from 18 April 2011)
- Prva HNL: 2nd
- Croatian Cup: Second round
- Europa League: Group stage
- Croatian Supercup: Runners-up
- Top goalscorer: League: Ante Vukušić (14); All: Ante Vukušić (18)
- Highest home attendance: 35,000 vs Unirea Urziceni (19 August 2010)
- Lowest home attendance: 2,500 (Three matches)
- Average home league attendance: 6,867
Home colours	Away colours

The 2010–11 season was the 100th season in Hajduk Split's history and their twentieth in the Prva HNL. Their second-place finish in the 2009–10 season meant it was their 20th successive season playing in the Prva HNL. It was the third tenure for manager Stanko Poklepović at Hajduk, after he was appointed following Edoardo Reja's departure to Lazio in February 2010. Poklepović won the Croatian Cup's previous season, his third silverware. The season covers a period from 1 June 2010 to 31 May 2011.

There were no arrivals during the pre-season transfer window, with players leaving the club or reducing their contractual obligations to ease the club's financial situation. The season started with an eleven-match unbeaten league run, but after three successive defeats in all three competitions during the October, Poklepović was sacked. Youth team coach Goran Vučević was appointed as caretaker manager and eventually signed a two-and-a-half-year contract in December. A four-match run without victory, which started with a defeat by rivals Dinamo Zagreb that diminished hope for a championship title, saw Vučević leaving the club on mutual consent. Ante Miše was appointed as his successor until the end of the season, in which time he won two out of five remaining matches. Hajduk finished the season in 2nd place in the Prva HNL behind Dinamo Zagreb for the third consecutive time. The board of directors chose not to extend the contract of Miše, and at the end of May, Krasimir Balakov was appointed as new manager.

The club reached the group stage of the UEFA Europa League, eliminating Dinamo Bucharest and Unirea Urziceni in progress. They finished in the last place, winning only one match, against Anderlecht. Hajduk reached the second round of the Croatian Cup, where the team were beaten 1–0 in the extra time by Istra 1961. Ante Vukušić was the club's top goalscorer after scoring 18 goals, with 14 in the league and four in the Europe.

== Background ==
Manager Edoardo Reja left Hajduk ten days before the start of the second part of the season with the team in 7th place, after he accepted the offer to manage Lazio. Stanko Poklepović was appointed as his successor, and led the team to a 2nd-place finish in the Prva HNL. Hajduk also won the Croatian Cup for the fifth time after defeating Šibenik in the final with an aggregate score 4–1. As the Cup winners they will enter Europa League campaign in the third qualifying round. After their contracts ended, Josip Skoko left to Australia to play for Melbourne Heart and Goran Rubil was signed by the Greek team Asteras Tripolis.

== Review ==
=== Pre-season ===
Hajduk Split opened their pre-season campaign with a 1–1 draw against Shanghai Shenhua, which was headed by former Hajduk manager Miroslav Blažević. They continued their tour of Slovenia and Austria, and won their first friendly game 5–4 against Austrian team Tondach Gleinstätten. On 30 July, Hajduk saw their first defeat in a friendly game. Slovenian team Domžale beat them 3–1, while Mirko Oremuš scored their only goal and Senijad Ibričić earned a direct red card. A 2–0 victory over Mura 05 saw midfielder Oremuš suffer an injury, but he returned to training after a week of absence. Their final game in the pre-season campaign, against Hamburger SV, ended as a 3–3 draw, with two goals from Ibričić. The game was played at Poljud in front of an attendance of 15,000 to commemorate 30 years after their quarter final match in 1979–80 European Cup which Hajduk won 3–2 but failed to advance in the semifinals due to away goals rule.

Hajduk's pre-season was busy with transfer activity, with players only leaving the club as Hajduk needed to get rid of financial ballast from last season. Hrvoje Vejić and Marijan Buljat agreed on reducing their contractual obligations, while Ivo Smoje and Ivan Rodić were released to Osijek and Rijeka, respectively. Dario Jertec refused to cut down his salary, and terminated his contract after playing only two games last season. Goalkeeper Vjekoslav Tomić and midfielder Florin Cernat left to Turkish Karabükspor, where they were soon joined by Anthony Šerić. Boris Pandža left Hajduk for €350,000 and signed a three-year contract with Belgian Mechelen.

=== July and August ===
Hajduk played against Dinamo Zagreb in the Croatian Supercup at Maksimir on 17 July. They lost 1–0, Igor Bišćan scored the winner 13 minutes from full-time. Hajduk's season started with a 6–1 victory over Istra 1961 on 24 July 2010. After the first half there was already 5–1, with five different players contributing to the score. Senijad Ibričić scored the sixth goal from a penalty kick. Hajduk started their European season with a 3–1 defeat away to Dinamo Bucharest. Second-half substitute Marin Tomasov scored the only goal for Hajduk. During the game Marin Ljubičić suffered a broken zygomatic bone. He underwent a surgery and is expected to be at least three months out of action. Only a few days later another injury hit Hajduk; Marijan Buljat broke a leg during the training meaning he would be out of action for six months.

First day of August brought the second league game which resulted in a 2–2 away draw against Osijek, with Ibričić scoring a late equalizer from a penalty kick. Same player was awarded with Heart of Hajduk on 4 August. In the second leg of Europa League qualifications Hajduk defeated Dinamo Bucharest 3–0 with goals from Vukušić, Brkljača and Tomasov. With an aggregate score 4–3 Hajduk advanced to the Europa League play-off round where they will meet another Romanian representative, Unirea Urziceni. On 8 August, Hajduk won the game against Šibenik 2–0 with goals from Vukušić and Ibričić. Same day, Mario Tičinović was loaned out to Karlovac for the remainder of the season. Hajduk took over the first place on the league table after 5–0 away win over Inter Zaprešić, with Vukušić again in the score line. On 19 August in front of the sold out Poljud, Hajduk beat Unirea Urziceni 4–1 with goals from Ibričić, Brkljača and Čop giving the team victory after being one goal down. Hajduk beat Zadar 4–1 in the next league game, again being one goal down. In the second leg of Europa League play-off, Ante Vukušić scored a late equalizing goal for a 1–1 away draw, and an aggregate 5–2 win against Unirea Urziceni. Hajduk entered the group stage of Europa League and was drawn in the group G along with Zenit St. Petersburg, Anderlecht and AEK Athens. After 50 years, Hajduk played in a local derby against RNK Split as they were promoted to top flight this season. The game was played at sold out Park Mladeži and ended with a 1–1 draw, with Vukušić scoring his sixth league goal.

=== September ===
Start of September was reserved for UEFA Euro 2012 qualifying games. Goalkeeper Danijel Subašić, defenders Ivan Strinić and Jurica Buljat received call-up to the Croatian team for their UEFA Euro 2012 qualifying games against Latvia and Greece, but Subašić was replaced after experiencing problems with knee injury. Strinić played the entire game in the 3–0 win over Latvia, and also in a goalless draw with Greece. Senijad Ibričić scored a goal for Bosnia and Herzegovina in the 3–0 win against Luxembourg, and got a yellow card in the 2–0 defeat against France.

On 11 September, Hajduk faced Dinamo in another edition of Croatian derby. Sammir scored for Dinamo in 42nd minute, while Anas Sharbini scored an equalizing goal in 59th minute for the final score 1–1, which maintained the team's unbeaten league record. Five days later, Hajduk played their first game in Europa League group stage away against AEK Athens. In the first half Rafik Djebbour scored for AEK, but Hajduk soon equalized through Ibričić. At the start of the second half Subašić saved a penalty, but his error lead AEK again to advantage when Nikos Liberopoulos scored. Hajduk's second loss in European season was confirmed when Nacho Scocco set the final score 3–1. Hajduk beat Rijeka 1–0 with a goal from Mario Brkljača in 88th minute, despite being a man down as former Rijeka's player Anas Sharbini was sent off at the start of the second half. In the first round of Croatian Cup, Duje Čop scored six goals in the 10–2 victory over Rudar 47. On 25 September, Hajduk won the game against Varaždin 2–0 with goals from Vukušić and Čop. On the last day of September, Hajduk defeated Anderlecht 1–0 at Poljud in a dramatic finish with a goal from Vukušić in the 95th minute.

=== October ===
Hajduk started October with a 1–1 draw with Karlovac, which allowed Dinamo to take over the first spot on the league table. Discipline committee suspended Anas Sharbini for two games because of hitting Mario Sačer while on the ground in the game against Varaždin. Early goal from Vukušić secured the 1–0 win against Slaven Belupo on 16 October. A 2–0 defeat by Zenit St. Petersburg ended Hajduk's streak of 18 consecutive games of scoring at least one goal. Three days later, Hajduk suffered another defeat which ended their unbeaten league record. They lost 2–1 to Cibalia with Vukušić scoring consolation goal from penalty for his 10th league goal. Hajduk was eliminated from the Croatian Cup following a 1–0 defeat in the extra time against Istra 1961 in the second round. As a result of recent poor performances and three successive losses, Poklepović was sacked as manager on 28 October, with assistant manager Joško Španjić taking over for the next fixture. Hajduk barely managed to defeat 2–1 the last placed Hrvatski Dragovoljac with Tomasov providing the late winner. On the same day Goran Vučević was appointed as caretaker manager until the winter break.

=== November ===
On 4 November, Hajduk played the second game in group stage against Zenit St. Petersburg on Poljud. Zenit led 3–0 with Jurica Buljat guilty for two penalties, but Marin Ljubičić and Ante Vukušić managed to score for a comforting 3–2 loss. After bad results in Europa League and Croatian Cup, Hajduk won the match against NK Zagreb 4–1 with two goals from Anas Sharbini and goals from Dinko Trebotić and Senijad Ibričić. In the 15th round of Prva HNL they defeated Lokomotiva 1–0 with goal from Mirko Oremuš. A week later they suffered a second defeat by Istra 1961, this time being beaten 2–0. Goalkeeper Danijel Subašić was ruled out for the rest of the year after he underwent knee surgery. The final game of November was a 2–1 win against Osijek, which saw a late own goal by Dino Gavrić.

=== December ===
Hajduk opened December with a 3–1 defeat by AEK Athens, which ended their hope for qualifying to knockout stage. They missed some good opportunities in the first half which ended goalless, but AEK triumphed thanks to goals from Nacho Scocco, Kostas Manolas and substitute Ismael Blanco. Jurica Buljat scored a late consolation goal. Last league game of the year was a 3–1 away win against Šibenik, with goals from Tomasov, Ibričić and captain Srđan Andrić who recovered from injury. A 2–0 defeat by Anderlecht followed, which meant Hajduk finished last in their group in Europa League with Zenit and Anderlecht progressing to knockout phase. At the end of 2010 calendar year Hajduk was five points behind Dinamo Zagreb in domestic league and was eliminated from Cup and Europe. Chairman Joško Svaguša was relieved from duty on 19 December, with Josip Grbić stepping in as a temporary replacement. On 28 December, Goran Vučević signed a two-and-a-half-year contract and was officially appointed as Hajduk's manager after his role as caretaker.

=== January and February ===
On 13 January, it was announced that Senijad Ibričić was transferred out to Lokomotiv Moscow for €5,000,000 and 20% of his next transfer fee. Mario Tičinović and Mario Sačer returned from their loan spells in Karlovac and Varaždin. Hajduk approached to sign Ivica Križanac after being released from Zenit earlier this month, but the deal fell through and Križanac joined city rivals RNK Split. Near the end of the month another player left Hajduk, Ivan Strinić was transferred out to Dnipro Dnipropetrovsk for €4,000,000. Hajduk sought a replacement for Strinić as they lacked left backs, and soon it was announced that Josip Barišić from Široki Brijeg signed a three-and-a-half-year contract. Srđan Andrić went to Germany for a joint surgery, which would have him ruled out for the remainder of the season but was eventually deemed unnecessary. Goran Vučević appointed top scorer Ante Vukušić as new team captain in the absence of Andrić.

During the mid-season Hajduk went on a two-week tour of Turkey, where they would play four friendly matches. They drew 0–0 with Austria Wien on 29 January, but three days later they beat Obolon Kyiv 3–2 with goals from brothers Sharbini and Vukušić. During the match with Obolon, Mario Brkljača suffered a knee ligament strain, meaning he would be out of action for at least a month. They were held to a 1–1 draw against Dinamo Bucharest as Dinko Trebotić scored the Hajduk goal. Their final game of the tour against Lech Poznań also ended as a 1–1 draw, with Marin Ljubičić scoring the goal. After their return from mid-season preparations in Antalya, Hajduk drew 0–0 with Dugopolje at Stadion Hrvatski vitezovi. On 13 February, Slavia Prague travelled to Split to commemorate the one hundredth anniversary of Hajduk. Slavia won 2–0 at sold-out Poljud with goals from Karol Kisel and Zoran Milutinović. Five days later, Hajduk defeated Dubrovnik 9–0 in the last game of the mid-season campaign. In their first league game after the winter break, Hajduk drew 0–0 against Inter Zaprešić at Poljud.

=== March ===
Anas Sharbini was suspended for the upcoming game against Zadar, after he drove his team-mates car on Poljud's athletics track. Hajduk defeated Zadar 2–0 with goals from Srđan Andrić and Marin Ljubičić. On 12 March, Hajduk faced city rival RNK Split. After a goalless first half, RNK Split took the lead thanks to a Hrvoje Vejić own goal. Hajduk recovered and won the game 3–1 with goals coming from Andrić and Vukušić. This was followed by the second derby of the season against Dinamo Zagreb at Maksimir. Milan Badelj and Fatos Bećiraj scored in a 2–0 Dinamo victory, which left Hajduk eight points behind them in the league.

=== April ===
At the start of April, Hajduk drew 1–1 with Rijeka, who equalised after Hajduk took the lead through Vukušić. This was followed by a heavy 3–0 defeat against Varaždin. Hajduk's next game against Karlovac ended as the first home defeat of the season. Although Hajduk successfully overturned the early lead with Vejić and Brkljača scoring for 2–1 at half-time, Karlovac staged a second half come-back to win 3–2. After four games without a win, Vučević left Hajduk after having his contract terminated by mutual consent. Two days later, Ante Miše was appointed as Hajduk's manager for the second time, after a spell in 2008–09 season when he also replaced Vučević at the helm. Hajduk beat Slaven Belupo 2–1 after going behind to an Elvis Kokalović goal, with Vukušić scoring the equaliser and Duje Čop scoring the winning goal. On 26 April, 32-year-old Hrvoje Maleš was elected as the new chairman of Hajduk, one of the youngest in club's history. At the end of April, Hajduk suffered their second home defeat of the month after being beaten 2–1 by Cibalia.

=== May ===
Hajduk suffered another defeat, a shock 2–0 by the last placed Hrvatski Dragovoljac. Several days later, Hajduk received a 40,000 euros fine from UEFA over conduct of their fans in the away game against Anderlecht. That brought the total of fines to 232,000 euros because of various incidents during their Europa League campaign. In their penultimate game of the season, Hajduk drew 2–2 with NK Zagreb bringing their second place in question. However, the final game of the Prva HNL season was a 2–0 win against Lokomotiva, which saw Hajduk finish the season in second place.

Following the end of the playing season, board decided not to extended contract with manager Ante Miše. On 27 May, it was announced that Krasimir Balakov will take over the helm of Hajduk. Four days later, Balakov officially signed a two-year contract with a possibility of one-year extension if a championship title is won. That same day, it was officially confirmed that Hajduk will play a friendly match against Barcelona, scheduled on 23 July and this way continuing the celebration of the club's centennial. However, Barcelona will be without their main stars who are participating in the Copa América.

== First-team squad ==
As of 26 January 2011

Note: Flags indicate national team as defined under FIFA eligibility rules; some limited exceptions apply. Players may hold more than one non-FIFA nationality.

No.	Pos.	Nation	Player
1	GK	CRO	Danijel Subašić
4	MF	CRO	Marin Ljubičić
5	DF	CRO	Jurica Buljat
6	MF	CRO	Franko Andrijašević
7	DF	CRO	Hrvoje Vejić
8	MF	CRO	Krešo Ljubičić
9	FW	CRO	Ahmad Sharbini
10	MF	CRO	Dinko Trebotić
11	MF	CRO	Srđan Andrić (captain)
12	GK	CRO	Lovre Kalinić
13	FW	CRO	Ante Vukušić
14	MF	CRO	Marin Tomasov
16	DF	CRO	Goran Jozinović

No.	Pos.	Nation	Player
18	MF	CRO	Mirko Oremuš
19	DF	CRO	Marijan Buljat
20	MF	CRO	Ante Režić
21	MF	CRO	Mario Brkljača
22	DF	CRO	Mario Maloča
24	MF	CRO	Mario Tičinović
25	GK	CRO	Božidar Radošević
26	DF	BIH	Josip Barišić
27	DF	CRO	Matej Jonjić
29	FW	CRO	Mario Sačer
88	MF	ALB	Ervin Bulku
90	FW	CRO	Duje Čop
99	MF	CRO	Anas Sharbini

== Competitions ==
=== Overall record ===
Performance by competition
Competition	Starting round	Final position/round	First match	Last match
Prva HNL	—N/a	Runners-up	24 July 2010	21 May 2011
Croatian Football Cup	First round	Second round	22 September 2010	27 October 2010
Super Cup	—N/a	Runners-up	17 July 2010	
UEFA Europa League	Third qualifying round	Group stage (4th)	29 July 2010	16 December 2010

Statistics by competition
Competition	Pld	W	D	L	GF	GA	GD	Win%
Prva HNL	30	16	7	7	54	32	+22	53.33
Croatian Football Cup	2	1	0	1	10	3	+7	50.00
Super Cup	1	0	0	1	0	1	−1	0.00
UEFA Europa League	10	3	1	6	14	18	−4	30.00
Total	43	20	8	15	78	54	+24	46.51

=== Prva HNL ===
==== Classification ====
Pos	Team	Pld	W	D	L	GF	GA	GD	Pts	Qualification or relegation
1	Dinamo Zagreb (C)	30	22	6	2	52	12	+40	72	Qualification to Champions League second qualifying round
2	Hajduk Split	30	16	7	7	54	32	+22	55	Qualification to Europa League third qualifying round
3	RNK Split	30	16	5	9	38	22	+16	53	Qualification to Europa League second qualifying round
4	Cibalia	30	12	8	10	33	24	+9	44	
5	Inter Zaprešić	30	12	6	12	31	35	−4	42	

Source: Prva-HNL.hr
Rules for classification: 1) points; 2) goal difference; 3) number of goals scored.
For deciding champions, qualification to UEFA Europa League and relegation: 1st points; 2nd head-to-head points; 3rd head-to-head goal difference; 4th head-to-head away goals scored
(C) Champions

==== Results summary ====
Overall								Home						Away					
Pld	W	D	L	GF	GA	GD	Pts	W	D	L	GF	GA	GD	W	D	L	GF	GA	GD
30	16	7	7	54	32	+22	55	10	3	2	33	13	+20	6	4	5	21	19	+2

Last updated: 21 May 2011.
Source: Sportnet.hr

==== Results by round ====
Round	1	2	3	4	5	6	7	8	9	10	11	12	13	14	15	16	17	18	19	20	21	22	23	24	25	26	27	28	29	30
Ground	H	A	H	A	H	A	H	A	H	A	H	A	H	H	A	A	H	A	H	A	H	A	H	A	H	A	H	A	A	H
Result	W	D	W	W	W	D	D	W	W	D	W	L	W	W	W	L	W	W	D	W	W	L	D	L	L	W	L	L	D	W
Position	1	4	3	1	1	2	2	1	1	2	2	2	2	2	2	2	2	2	2	2	2	2	2	2	2	2	2	2	2	2

Source: Competitive matches
A = Away; H = Home; W = Win; D = Draw; L = Loss

==== Results by opponent ====
Team	Results		Points
Team	1	2	Points
Cibalia	1–2	1–2	0
Dinamo Zagreb	1–1	0–2	1
H. Dragovoljac	2–1	0–2	3
Inter Zaprešić	5–0	0–0	4
Istra 1961	6–1	0–2	3
Karlovac	1–1	2–3	1
Lokomotiva	1–0	2–0	6
Osijek	2–2	2–1	4
Rijeka	1–0	1–1	4
Šibenik	2–0	3–1	6
Slaven Belupo	4–1	1–1	4
RNK Split	1–1	3–1	4
Varaždin	2–0	0–3	3
Zadar	4–1	2–0	6
NK Zagreb	4–1	2–2	4

Source: 2010–11 Croatian First Football League article

== Matches ==
=== Friendlies ===
==== Pre-season ====
Match	Date	Venue	Opponent	Score	Attendance	Hajduk Scorers	Report
1	23 Jun	N (Slovenia)	Shanghai Shenhua (China)	1–1	100	Čop	Sportnet.hr
2	26 Jun	A (Austria)	Tondach Gleinstätten (Austria)	5–4	600	Ah. Sharbini (2), An. Sharbini, M. Ljubičić, Ibričić	Sportnet.hr
3	30 Jun	A (Slovenia)	Domžale (Slovenia)	1–3	1,200	Oremuš	Sportnet.hr
4	1 Jul	A (Slovenia)	Mura 05 (Slovenia)	2–0	500	Oremuš, Lendrić	Sportnet.hr
5	14 Jul	H	HSV (Germany)	3–3	15,000	Ibričić (2), Rozehnal (o.g.)	Sportnet.hr

==== On-season ====
Match	Date	Venue	Opponent	Score	Attendance	Hajduk Scorers	Report
1	10 Aug	A	Omladinac Vranjic	1–3	–	Tomasov	hajduk.hr
2	9 Sep	A	Zadar	0–1	1,200		hajduk.hr
3	8 Oct	A (Bosnia and Herzegovina)	Široki Brijeg (Bosnia and Herzegovina)	0–2	4,000		hajduk.hr
4	11 Oct	A (Bosnia and Herzegovina)	Troglav Livno (Bosnia and Herzegovina)	4–0	–	Ibričić, Čop, Trebotić, K. Ljubičić	hajduk.hr
5	11 Dec	H	Rosenborg (Norway)	1–2	1,500	Vukušić	hajduk.hr
5	27 Apr	H	Jadran KS	4–1	–	Jonjić, Trebotić, Ah. Sharbini, Sačer	hajduk.hr

==== Mid-season ====
Match	Date	Venue	Opponent	Score	Attendance	Hajduk Scorers	Report
1	29 Jan	N (Turkey)	Austria Wien	0–0	50		Sportnet.hr
2	1 Feb	N (Turkey)	Obolon Kyiv (Ukraine)	3–2	50	An. Sharbini, Vukušić, Ah. Sharbini	Sportnet.hr
3	4 Feb	N (Turkey)	Dinamo Bucharest (Romania)	1–1	100	Trebotić	Sportnet.hr
4	7 Feb	N (Turkey)	Lech Poznań (Poland)	1–1	100	M. Ljubičić	Sportnet.hr
5	10 Feb	A	Dugopolje	0–0	1,000		Sportnet.hr
6	13 Feb	H	Slavia Prague (Czech Republic)	0–2	40,000		Sportnet.hr
7	18 Feb	A	Dubrovnik 1919	9–0	3,000	Vukušić, Ah. Sharbini, Andrijašević (2), Čop (4), Sačer	Sportnet.hr

=== Croatian Football Super Cup ===
17 July 2010 Final	Dinamo Zagreb	1–0	Hajduk Split	Zagreb
21:00 CEST (UTC+02:00)	Dodô (yellow card) 67'; Bišćan 77'; Sammir (yellow card) 82'	Report	Režić (yellow card) 18'; Brkljača (yellow card) 34'	Stadium: Stadion Maksimir; Attendance: 8,000; Referee: Draženko Kovačić (Križevci)

Source: HRnogomet.com

=== Prva HNL ===
24 July 2010 1	Hajduk Split	6–1	Istra 1961	Split
20:00 CEST (UTC+02:00)	An. Sharbini 19'; Oremuš 25'; Andrić 34'; Ah. Sharbini 36'; M. Ljubičić 44'; Ibričić 81' (pen.)	Report	Šehić 20'; Alimi (yellow card) 43'; Kovačević (yellow card) 65'; Stranatić (yellow card) 81'	Stadium: Stadion Poljud; Attendance: 5,000; Referee: Mario Zebec (Cestica)

1 August 2010 2	Osijek	2–2	Hajduk Split	Osijek
20:00 CEST (UTC+02:00)	S. Vidaković 14'; Miličević 38'; Šorša (yellow card) 86'	Report	J. Buljat 36'; An. Sharbini (yellow card) 52'; Ibričić 86' (pen.); Strinić (yellow card) 89'	Stadium: Stadion Gradski vrt Attendance: 6,000; Referee: Igor Pristovnik (Zagreb)

8 August 2010 3	Hajduk Split	2–0	Šibenik	Split
20:00 CEST (UTC+02:00)	Ibričić 8'; Vukušić 73'; An. Sharbini (yellow card) 79'	Report	Elez (yellow card) 76'	Stadium: Stadion Poljud; Attendance: 8,000; Referee: Lukša Klaić (Konavle)

14 August 2010 4	Inter Zaprešić	0–5	Hajduk Split	Zaprešić
20:15 CEST (UTC+02:00)		Report	An. Sharbini 15'; Tomasov 16'; Vukušić 22', 26'; Trebotić (yellow card) 23'; Čop 66'	Stadium: Stadion ŠRC Zaprešić; Attendance: 2,500; Referee: Ante Vučemilović-Šimunović (Osijek)

22 August 2010 5	Hajduk Split	4–1	Zadar	Split
20:00 CEST (UTC+02:00)	Tomasov 39'; Vukušić 48', 80'; Ibričić 90'	Report	Bilaver (yellow card) 24'; Pezo 34'; Puljić (yellow card) 43'; Peraić (yellow card) 64'	Stadium: Stadion Poljud; Attendance: 10,000; Referee: Marijo Strahonja (Zagreb)

29 August 2010 6	RNK Split	1–1	Hajduk Split	Split
20:00 CEST (UTC+02:00)	Obilinović (yellow card) 57'; Golubović 67'; Lojić (yellow card) 80'; Šimić (yellow card) 87'; Vitaić (yellow card) 90+1'	Report	Vukušić 13'; J. Buljat (yellow card) 90'	Stadium: Stadion Park Mladeži; Attendance: 5,500; Referee: Goran Gabrilo (Split)

11 September 2010 7	Hajduk Split	1–1	Dinamo Zagreb	Split
19:00 CEST (UTC+02:00)	An. Sharbini 59'	Report	Sammir 42'; Etto (yellow card) 44'	Stadium: Stadion Poljud; Attendance: 35,000; Referee: Andrej Burilo (Osijek)

19 September 2010 8	Rijeka	0–1	Hajduk Split	Rijeka
20:05 CEST (UTC+02:00)	Rodić (yellow card) 26'; Rukavina (yellow card) 33'; Čagalj (yellow card) 64'; Švrljuga (yellow card) 75'; Vukman (yellow card) 77'	Report	Ibričić (yellow card) 33'; An. Sharbini (red card) 46'; Brkljača (yellow card) 60', (goal) 88'	Stadium: Stadion Kantrida; Attendance: 3,000; Referee: Dalibor Mlakar (Zagreb)

25 September 2010 9	Hajduk Split	2–0	Varaždin	Split
18:00 CEST (UTC+02:00)	Vukušić 44'; An. Sharbini (yellow card) 57'; Brkljača (yellow card) 66'; Tomasov (yellow card) 81'; Čop 87'	Report	Brlečić (yellow card) 26'; Šimek (yellow card) 37'	Stadium: Stadion Poljud; Attendance: 3,500; Referee: Ante Vučemilović-Šimunović (Osijek)

3 October 2010 10	Karlovac	1–1	Hajduk Split	Karlovac
17:30 CEST (UTC+02:00)	Novinić 66'	Report	Vukušić 25'; M. Ljubičić (yellow card) 65'; Ibričić (yellow card) 66'; Čop (yellow card) 74' (yellow-red card) 90+3'	Stadium: Stadion Branko Čavlović-Čavlek; Attendance: 4,000; Referee: Domagoj Ljubičić (Osijek)

16 October 2010 11	Hajduk Split	1–0	Slaven Belupo	Split
18:00 CEST (UTC+02:00)	Vukušić 3'; Ibričić (yellow card) 27'; Bulku (yellow card) 73'	Report	Milardović (yellow card) 24'; Kokalović (yellow card) 80'	Stadium: Stadion Poljud; Attendance: 4,500; Referee: Igor Križarić (Čakovec)

24 October 2010 12	Cibalia	2–1	Hajduk Split	Vinkovci
18:00 CEST (UTC+02:00)	Prgomet 6', (yellow card) 50'; Jurić (yellow card) 14'; Bartolović 71' (pen.); Čuljak (yellow card) 80'	Report	Režić (yellow card) 11'; K. Ljubičić (yellow card) 71'; Vukušić 76' (pen.)	Stadium: Stadion HNK Cibalia; Attendance: 6,000; Referee: Fran Jović (Zagreb)

30 October 2010 13	Hajduk Split	2–1	Hrvatski Dragovoljac	Split
17:00 CEST (UTC+02:00)	J. Buljat 39'; Tomasov 82'	Report	Novak 59', (yellow card) 60'; Jurin (yellow card) 60'	Stadium: Stadion Poljud; Attendance: 3,000; Referee: Mario Zebec (Cestica)

7 November 2010 14	Hajduk Split	4–1	NK Zagreb	Split
16:00 CET (UTC+01:00)	Trebotić 48'; Maloča (yellow card) 59'; An. Sharbini 61', 88'; Ibričić 73'	Report	Krstanović 77'	Stadium: Stadion Poljud; Attendance: 2,500; Referee: Domagoj Vučkov (Rijeka)

13 November 2010 15	Lokomotiva	0–1	Hajduk Split	Zagreb
14:00 CET (UTC+01:00)	Maleš (yellow card) 45'	Report	Oremuš 22'; M. Ljubičić (yellow card) 61'; Bulku (yellow card) 90+2'	Stadium: Stadion Maksimir; Attendance: 2,000; Referee: Zlatko Šimčić (Koprivnica)

20 November 2010 16	Istra 1961	2–0	Hajduk Split	Pula
13:30 CET (UTC+01:00)	Alimi 51', (yellow card) 51'; Šehić 70'	Report	Maloča (yellow card) 59'; M. Ljubičić (yellow card) 77'	Stadium: Stadion Veruda; Attendance: 4,000; Referee: Igor Pristovnik (Zagreb)

27 November 2010 17	Hajduk Split	2–1	Osijek	Split
16:00 CET (UTC+01:00)	Vukušić 18'; Ibričić (yellow card) 40'; Jozinović (yellow card) 54'; Strinić (yellow card) 82'; Gavrić 86' (o.g.); Maloča (yellow card) 90+2'	Report	Pavličić 16'; Gavrić (yellow card) 45+1'; Pavličić (yellow card) 60'; Kurtović (yellow card) 77'; Kardum (yellow card) 86'	Stadium: Stadion Poljud; Attendance: 3,000; Referee: Marijo Strahonja (Zagreb)

5 December 2010 18	Šibenik	1–3	Hajduk Split	Šibenik
14:00 CET (UTC+01:00)	Alispahić 90' (pen.)	Report	Tomasov 47'; Andrić 49'; Jonjić (yellow card) 61'; Ibričić 87'	Stadium: Stadion Šubićevac; Attendance: 3,000; Referee: Alen Gerek (Zabok)

26 February 2011 19	Hajduk Split	0–0	Inter Zaprešić	Split
17:00 CET (UTC+01:00)		Report	Balić (yellow card) 39'; Valentić (yellow card) 61'; Barišić (yellow card) 68'; Babić (yellow card) 84'; Santini (yellow card) 90'; Abilaliaj (yellow card) 90+1'	Stadium: Stadion Poljud; Attendance: 5,000; Referee: Ante Vučemilović-Šimunović (Osijek)

5 March 2011 20	Zadar	0–2	Hajduk Split	Zadar
15:00 CET (UTC+01:00)	Mršić (yellow card) 36'	Report	Vejić (yellow card) 12'; Andrić 48'; Vukušić (yellow card) 50'; Tičinović (yellow card) 62'; M. Ljubičić 86'	Stadium: Stadion Stanovi; Attendance: 4,000; Referee: Vlado Svilokos (Sisak)

12 March 2011 21	Hajduk Split	3–1	RNK Split	Split
20:10 CET (UTC+01:00)	M. Ljubičić (yellow card) 12'; Vejić (yellow card) 25'; Vukušić (yellow card) 55', (goal) 81'; Andrić 59', 90+1', (yellow card) 61'	Report	Pehar (yellow card) 29'; Vejić 52' (o.g.); Križanac (yellow card) 89'	Stadium: Stadion Poljud; Attendance: 8,000; Referee: Fran Jović (Zagreb)

19 March 2011 22	Dinamo Zagreb	2–0	Hajduk Split	Zagreb
20:10 CET (UTC+01:00)	Badelj (yellow card) 15', (goal) 23'; Cufré (yellow card) 34'; Bećiraj 69'	Report	Oremuš (yellow card) 20'; Trebotić (yellow card) 79'; Ah. Sharbini (red card) 83'	Stadium: Stadion Maksimir; Attendance: 15,000; Referee: Andrej Burilo (Osijek)

2 April 2010 23	Hajduk Split	1–1	Rijeka	Split
18:00 CEST (UTC+02:00)	Vukušić 33' (pen.); Vejić (yellow card) 80'	Report	Budicin (yellow card) 32', (goal) 41'; Štrok (yellow card) 34'	Stadium: Stadion Poljud; Attendance: 6,000; Referee: Igor Križarić (Čakovec)

9 April 2011 24	Varaždin	3–0	Hajduk Split	Varaždin
20:10 CEST (UTC+02:00)	Vugrinec 12', 82'; Brlečić 52'; Glavica (yellow card) 66'	Report	M. Ljubičić (yellow card) 25'	Stadium: Stadion Varteks; Attendance: 2,000; Referee: Tihomir Pejin (Donji Miholjac)

16 April 2011 25	Hajduk Split	2–3	Karlovac	Split
18:00 CEST (UTC+02:00)	Vejić 11'; Brkljača 29'; K. Ljubičić (yellow card) 83'	Report	Primorac 6'; Štefančić 49', (yellow card) 50'; Husić 58'; Budimir (yellow card) 70'; Špišić (yellow card) 90'	Stadium: Stadion Poljud; Attendance: 2,500; Referee: Ivan Bebek (Rijeka)

23 April 2011 26	Slaven Belupo	1–2	Hajduk Split	Koprivnica
20:10 CEST (UTC+02:00)	Kokalović 6'; Gregurina (yellow card) 80'; Frljužec (yellow card) 84'	Report	Vukušić 34'; Čop 74', (yellow card) 79'	Stadium: Gradski stadion Attendance: 3,000; Referee: Marko Matoc (Zaprešić)

30 April 2011 27	Hajduk Split	1–2	Cibalia	Split
19:00 CEST (UTC+02:00)	Čop 11'; Andrić (yellow card) 77'; Bulku (red card) 88'	Report	Prgomet (yellow card) 11', (goal) 13'; Čuljak 59'	Stadium: Stadion Poljud; Attendance: 3,000; Referee: Marijo Strahonja (Zagreb)

6 May 2011 28	Hrvatski Dragovoljac	2–0	Hajduk Split	Zagreb
19:00 CEST (UTC+02:00)	Grgić 54'; Žugaj (yellow card) 57'; Jazvić 76'; I. Vidaković (yellow card) 85'	Report	Jozinović (yellow card) 53'; J. Buljat (yellow card) 57'; Režić (yellow card) 83'	Stadium: Stadion NŠC Stjepan Spajić; Attendance: 2,000; Referee: Mario Novak (Osijek)

14 May 2011 29	NK Zagreb	2–2	Hajduk Split	Zagreb
20:10 CEST (UTC+02:00)	Krstanović 20', 77' (pen.); Jugović (yellow card) 35'; Pavlović (yellow card) 63'; Šovšić (yellow card) 64'; Chiavarini (yellow card) 78'	Report	Brkljača 12', (yellow card) 18'; Jozinović (yellow card) 32' (yellow-red card) 47'; Čop 48'; Maloča (yellow card) 59'; M. Ljubičić (yellow card) 90+4'	Stadium: Stadion Kranjčevićeva; Attendance: 1,500; Referee: Damir Batinić (Osijek)

21 May 2011 30	Hajduk Split	2–0	Lokomotiva	Split
18:00 CEST (UTC+02:00)	M. Buljat (yellow card) 33'; Ah. Sharbini 40'; Subašić (yellow card) 41'; Trebotić 47'; Bulku (yellow card) 70'	Report	Samateh (red card) 30'; Peko (yellow card) 63'; Martinac (yellow card) 81'	Stadium: Stadion Poljud; Attendance: 4,000; Referee: Andrej Burilo (Osijek)

Source: HRnogomet.com

=== Croatian Football Cup ===
21 September 2010 R1	Rudar 47	2–10	Hajduk Split	Ladanje Donje
15:30 CEST (UTC+02:00)	Stolnik (yellow card) 33'; Martan (yellow card) 35'; Turković (yellow card) 40'; Tekić 54'; Petrić 59'	Report	Čop 6', 8', 10', 12', 45', 52'; M. Ljubičić (yellow card) 26'; Tomasov 32', 33'; Andrijašević 57'; Oremuš 78'	Stadium: Igraliste Šofta; Attendance: 2,000; Referee: Igor Križarić (Čakovec)

27 October 2010 R2	Hajduk Split	0–1 (a.e.t.)	Istra 1961	Split
17:00 CEST (UTC+02:00)	Ibričić (yellow card) 72'; M. Ljubičić (yellow card) 102'	Report	Marković (yellow card) 24'; Žuržinov (yellow card) 75'; Pauletić (yellow card) 77'; Hadžić 105', (yellow card) 110'; Škorić (yellow card) 119'	Stadium: Stadion Poljud; Attendance: 3,000; Referee: Damir Batinić (Osijek)

Source: HRnogomet.com

=== Europa League ===
==== Third qualifying round ====
29 July 2010 First leg	Dinamo București (Romania)	3–1	(Croatia) Hajduk Split	Bucharest, Romania
21:00 EEST (UTC+03:00)	An. Cristea 6' (pen.); N'Doye (yellow card) 25'; Torje (yellow card) 34'; Garat 40'; Pulhac (yellow card) 42'; Koné 70', (yellow card) 70'	Report	Subašić (yellow card) 5'; Oremuš (yellow card) 29'; J. Buljat (yellow card) 45+2'; Tomasov 64'; Brkljača (yellow card) 87'	Stadium: Stadionul Dinamo; Attendance: 8,000; Referee: Lee Probert (England)

5 August 2010 Second leg	Hajduk Split (Croatia)	3–0 (4–3 agg.)	(Romania) Dinamo București	Split, Croatia
20:30 CEST (UTC+02:00)	Vukušić 12'; Brkljača 23'; Tomasov 38'; Ibričić (yellow card) 42'; Subašić (yellow card) 82'	Report	Cristea (yellow card) 34'; N'Doye (yellow card) 74'; Homei (yellow card) 86'	Stadium: Stadion Poljud; Attendance: 28,000; Referee: Carlos Xistra (Portugal)

==== Play-off round ====
19 August 2010 First leg	Hajduk Split (Croatia)	4–1	(Romania) Unirea Urziceni	Split, Croatia
20:30 CEST (UTC+02:00)	Ibričić 39', 66'; Brkljača 78'; Čop 85', (yellow card) 85'	Report	Frunza 34'; Paraschiv (yellow card) 51'; Brandán (yellow card) 68'	Stadium: Stadion Poljud; Attendance: 35,000; Referee: Antonio Damato (Italy)

26 August 2010 Second leg	Unirea Urziceni (Romania)	1–1 (2–5 agg.)	(Croatia) Hajduk Split	Bucharest, Romania
20:30 EEST (UTC+03:00)	Bilașco 2'; Rusescu (yellow card) 56'; Bordeanu (yellow card) 59'; Mehmedović (yellow card) 76'; Maftei (red card) 82'	Report	Brkljača (yellow card) 37' (yellow-red card) 66'; Subašić (yellow card) 45'; Andrić (yellow card) 73'; Vukušić 88', (yellow card) 89'	Stadium: Stadionul Steaua; Attendance: 918; Referee: Claudio Circhetta (Switzerland)

==== Group stage ====
Pos	Team	Pld	W	D	L	GF	GA	GD	Pts	Qualification	ZNT	AND	AEK	HAJ
1	(Russia) Zenit Saint Petersburg	6	6	0	0	18	6	+12	18	Advance to knockout phase	—	3–1	4–2	2–0
2	(Belgium) Anderlecht	6	2	1	3	8	8	0	7	Advance to knockout phase	1–3	—	3–0	2–0
3	(Greece) AEK Athens	6	2	1	3	9	13	−4	7		0–3	1–1	—	3–1
4	(Croatia) Hajduk Split	6	1	0	5	5	13	−8	3		2–3	1–0	1–3	—

Source: Soccerway

16 September 2010 1	AEK Athens (Greece)	3–1	(Croatia) Hajduk Split	Athens, Greece
22:05 EEST (UTC+03:00)	Djebbour 12'; Diop (yellow card) 28'; Liberopoulos 65'; Scocco 89'	Report	Ibričić 29' (pen.); Strinić (yellow card) 58'	Stadium: Olympic Stadium; Attendance: 16,182; Referee: Bas Nijhuis (Netherlands)

30 September 2010 2	Hajduk Split (Croatia)	1–0	(Belgium) Anderlecht	Split, Croatia
19:00 CEST (UTC+02:00)	Bulku (yellow card) 88'; Maloča (yellow card) 90'; Vukušić 90+5'	Report		Stadium: Stadion Poljud; Attendance: 33,000; Referee: Bülent Yıldırım (Turkey)

21 October 2010 3	Zenit Saint Petersburg (Russia)	2–0	(Croatia) Hajduk Split	Saint Petersburg, Russia
21:00 MSD (UTC+04:00)	Bukharov 25'; Danny 68'; Zyryanov (yellow card) 79'	Report	Ibričić (yellow card) 26'	Stadium: Petrovsky Stadium; Attendance: 20,200; Referee: Libor Kovařik (Czech Republic)

4 November 2010 4	Hajduk Split (Croatia)	2–3	(Russia) Zenit Saint Petersburg	Split, Croatia
21:05 CET (UTC+01:00)	Vejić (yellow card) 67'; M. Ljubičić 69'; Vukušić 82'; Maloča (yellow card) 85'; Ah. Sharbini (yellow card) 89'	Report	Ionov (yellow card) 12', (goal) 32'; Huszti 47' (pen.); Rosina 51'	Stadium: Stadion Poljud; Attendance: 28,000; Referee: Eduardo Iturralde González (Spain)

1 December 2010 5	Hajduk Split (Croatia)	1–3	(Greece) AEK Athens	Split, Croatia
19:00 CET (UTC+01:00)	Maloča (yellow card) 11'; J. Buljat (yellow card) 30', (goal) 90'; M. Ljubičić (yellow card) 36'; Jozinović (yellow card) 53'; Ibričić (yellow card) 88'	Report	Gentsoglou (yellow card) 31'; Scocco 50' (pen.); Manolas 61'; Blanco 84'	Stadium: Stadion Poljud; Attendance: 15,000; Referee: Mike Dean (England)

16 December 2010 6	Anderlecht (Belgium)	2–0	(Croatia) Hajduk Split	Brussels, Belgium
21:05 CET (UTC+01:00)	De Sutter 12'; Suárez 41'	Report	Strinić (yellow card) 64'; Vejić (yellow card) 73'	Stadium: Constant Vanden Stock Stadium; Attendance: 14,979; Referee: Stefan Johannesson (Sweden)

Source: uefa.com

== Player seasonal records ==
Competitive matches only. Updated to games played 21 May 2011.

=== Top scorers ===
Rank	Name	League	Europe	Cup	Total
1	(Croatia) Ante Vukušić	14	4	–	18
2	(Croatia) Duje Čop	5	1	6	12
3	(Bosnia and Herzegovina) Senijad Ibričić	6	3	–	9
4	(Croatia) Marin Tomasov	4	2	2	8
5	(Croatia) Srđan Andrić	5	–	–	5
5	(Croatia) Mario Brkljača	3	2	–	5
5	(Croatia) Anas Sharbini	5	–	–	5
8	(Croatia) Jurica Buljat	2	1	–	3
8	(Croatia) Marin Ljubičić	2	1	–	3
8	(Croatia) Mirko Oremuš	2	–	1	3
11	(Croatia) Ahmad Sharbini	2	–	–	2
11	(Croatia) Dinko Trebotić	2	–	–	2
13	(Croatia) Franko Andrijašević	–	–	1	1
13	(Croatia) Hrvoje Vejić	1	–	–	1
	Own goals	1	–	–	1
	TOTALS	54	14	10	78

Source: Competitive matches

=== Disciplinary record ===
Includes all competitive matches. Players with 1 card or more included only.

Number	Position	Name	1. HNL (Note: Two yellow cards resulting in a red are counted as a total of three cards - i.e. two yellow and one red card.)		Europa League		Croatian Cup		Total	
Number	Position	Name	Booked	Sent off (straight red)	Booked	Sent off (straight red)	Booked	Sent off (straight red)	Booked	Sent off (straight red)
1	GK	(Croatia) Danijel Subašić	2	0	3	0	0	0	5	0
4	MF	(Croatia) Marin Ljubičić	6	0	1	0	2	0	9	0
5	DF	(Croatia) Jurica Buljat	3	0	2	0	0	0	5	0
7	DF	(Croatia) Hrvoje Vejić	3	0	3	0	0	0	6	0
8	MF	(Croatia) Krešo Ljubičić	2	0	0	0	0	0	2	0
9	FW	(Croatia) Ahmad Sharbini	0	1	0	0	0	0	0	1
10	MF	(Croatia) Dinko Trebotić	2	0	0	0	0	0	2	0
10	MF	(Bosnia and Herzegovina) Senijad Ibričić	4	0	3	0	1	0	8	0
11	MF	(Croatia) Srđan Andrić	2	0	1	0	0	0	3	0
13	FW	(Croatia) Ante Vukušić	2	0	1	0	0	0	3	0
14	MF	(Croatia) Marin Tomasov	1	0	0	0	0	0	1	0
16	DF	(Croatia) Goran Jozinović	4	1	1	0	0	0	5	1
17	DF	(Croatia) Ivan Strinić	2	0	2	0	0	0	4	0
18	MF	(Croatia) Mirko Oremuš	1	0	1	0	0	0	2	0
19	DF	(Croatia) Marijan Buljat	1	0	0	0	0	0	1	0
20	MF	(Croatia) Ante Režić	2	0	0	0	0	0	2	0
21	MF	(Croatia) Mario Brkljača	3	0	3	1	0	0	6	1
22	DF	(Croatia) Mario Maloča	4	0	3	0	0	0	7	0
24	MF	(Croatia) Mario Tičinović	1	0	0	0	0	0	1	0
27	DF	(Croatia) Matej Jonjić	1	0	0	0	0	0	1	0
88	MF	(Albania) Ervin Bulku	3	1	1	0	0	0	4	1
90	FW	(Croatia) Duje Čop	3	1	1	0	0	0	4	1
99	MF	(Croatia) Anas Sharbini	3	1	1	0	0	0	4	1
		TOTALS	55	5	27	1	3	0	85	6

Sources: Prva-HNL.hr, UEFA.com

=== Appearances and goals ===
Number	Position	Player	Apps	Goals	Apps	Goals	Apps	Goals	Apps	Goals
Number	Position	Player	Total		1. HNL (Note: First number represents appearances in starting eleven, while the second number indicates a substitute appearance.)		Europa League		Croatian Cup	
1	GK	(Croatia) Danijel Subašić	27	0	20+0	0	7+0	0	0+0	0
4	MF	(Croatia) Marin Ljubičić	29	3	15+5	2	6+1	1	2+0	0
5	DF	(Croatia) Jurica Buljat	35	3	24+0	2	10+0	1	1+0	0
6	MF	(Croatia) Franko Andrijašević	9	1	4+3	0	0+1	0	0+1	1
6	MF	(Croatia) Tonći Kukoč	1	0	0+1	0	0+0	0	0+0	0
7	DF	(Croatia) Hrvoje Vejić	30	1	17+3	1	5+3	0	1+1	0
8	MF	(Croatia) Krešo Ljubičić	11	0	5+4	0	0+0	0	1+1	0
9	FW	(Croatia) Ahmad Sharbini	13	2	4+9	2	0+0	0	0+0	0
10	MF	(Croatia) Dinko Trebotić	28	2	14+7	2	2+4	0	1+0	0
10	MF	(Bosnia and Herzegovina) Senijad Ibričić	29	9	17+0	6	10+0	3	2+0	0
11	MF	(Croatia) Srđan Andrić	22	5	16+0	5	5+1	0	0+0	0
12	GK	(Croatia) Lovre Kalinić	1	0	1+0	0	0+0	0	0+0	0
13	FW	(Croatia) Ante Vukušić	40	18	28+1	14	9+0	4	1+1	0
14	MF	(Croatia) Marin Tomasov	37	8	16+10	4	7+2	2	2+0	2
16	DF	(Croatia) Goran Jozinović	27	0	15+7	0	3+1	0	1+0	0
17	DF	(Croatia) Ivan Strinić	22	0	11+1	0	9+0	0	1+0	0
18	MF	(Croatia) Mirko Oremuš	32	3	17+4	2	7+2	0	2+0	1
19	DF	(Croatia) Marijan Buljat	2	0	1+1	0	0+0	0	0+0	0
20	MF	(Croatia) Ante Režić	12	0	6+3	0	1+1	0	0+1	0
21	MF	(Croatia) Mario Brkljača	29	5	11+11	3	4+2	2	1+0	0
22	DF	(Croatia) Mario Maloča	37	0	26+1	0	9+0	0	1+0	0
24	MF	(Croatia) Mario Tičinović	9	0	7+2	0	0+0	0	0+0	0
25	GK	(Croatia) Božidar Radošević	14	0	9+0	0	3+0	0	2+0	0
26	DF	(Bosnia and Herzegovina) Josip Barišić	5	0	4+1	0	0+0	0	0+0	0
27	DF	(Croatia) Matej Jonjić	7	0	4+0	0	1+1	0	1+0	0
29	FW	(Croatia) Mario Sačer	2	0	1+1	0	0+0	0	0+0	0
88	MF	(Albania) Ervin Bulku	19	0	12+3	0	3+1	0	0+0	0
90	FW	(Croatia) Duje Čop	22	12	8+6	5	0+6	1	1+1	6
99	MF	(Croatia) Anas Sharbini	30	5	18+2	5	9+0	0	1+0	0

Sources: Prva-HNL.hr, UEFA.com

== Transfers ==
=== In ===
Date	Position	Player	From	Fee
19 August 2010	MF	(Albania) Ervin Bulku	Kryvbas Kryvyi Rih	Free
29 January 2011	DF	(Bosnia and Herzegovina) Josip Barišić	Široki Brijeg	€150,000

=== Out ===
Date	Position	Player	To	Fee
10 June 2010	GK	(Croatia) Vjekoslav Tomić	Karabükspor	Free
16 June 2010	DF	(Croatia) Mladen Pelaić	Osijek	Free
19 June 2010	DF	(Croatia) Ivo Smoje	Osijek	Free
23 June 2010	MF	(Croatia) Dario Jertec	Al-Faisaly	Free
28 June 2010	MF	(Romania) Florin Cernat	Karabükspor	Free
3 July 2010	DF	(Croatia) Anthony Šerić	Karabükspor	Free
9 July 2010	DF	(Bosnia and Herzegovina) Boris Pandža	Mechelen	€350,000
10 August 2010	DF	(Croatia) Ante Aračić	Šibenik	Free
14 January 2011	MF	(Bosnia and Herzegovina) Senijad Ibričić	Lokomotiv Moscow	€5,000,000
27 January 2011	DF	(Croatia) Ivan Strinić	Dnipro Dnipropetrovsk	€4,000,000

=== Loans out ===
Date	Position	Player	To	Until
10 July 2010	MF	(Croatia) Toni Pezo	Zadar	End of season
15 July 2010	FW	(Croatia) Leopold Novak	Hrvatski Dragovoljac	9 January 2011
28 July 2010	GK	(Croatia) Dante Stipica	Solin	12 January 2011
28 July 2010	FW	(Croatia) Ivan Lendrić	Zrinjski Mostar	End of season
9 August 2010	MF	(Croatia) Mario Tičinović	Karlovac	13 January 2011
21 August 2010	FW	(Croatia) Tedi Surać	Mosor	13 January 2011
21 August 2010	FW	(Croatia) Hrvoje Tokić	Mosor	12 February 2011
13 January 2011	FW	(Croatia) Tedi Surać	Dugopolje	End of season
21 January 2011	MF	(Croatia) Tonći Kukoč	Hrvatski Dragovoljac	End of season
26 January 2011	FW	(Croatia) Leopold Novak	NK Zagreb	End of season
27 January 2011	MF	(Croatia) Marin Zulim	Zadar	End of season
2 February 2011	GK	(Croatia) Dante Stipica	Zmaj Makarska	End of season
12 February 2011	FW	(Croatia) Hrvoje Tokić	MV Croatia	End of season

Sources: nogometni-magazin.com
