= 2009–10 HNK Hajduk Split season =

Hajduk Split
2009–10 season
- Chairman: Mate Peroš (until 7 August 2009); Joško Svaguša (from 8 August 2009)
- Manager: Ante Miše (until 2 August 2009); Ivica Kalinić (from 3 August to 18 August 2009); Edoardo Reja (from 18 August 2009 to 9 February 2010); Stanko Poklepović (from 12 February 2010)
- Prva HNL: 2nd
- Croatian Cup: Winners
- Europa League: Third qualifying round
- Top goalscorer: League: Senijad Ibričić (17); All: Senijad Ibričić (24)
- Highest home attendance: 30,000 vs Dinamo Zagreb (7 April 2010)
- Lowest home attendance: 0 vs Zadar (2 August 2009)
- Average home league attendance: 4,633
Home colours	Away colours

The 2009–10 season was the 99th season in Hajduk Split’s history and their nineteenth in the Prva HNL. Their 2nd place finish in the 2008–09 season meant it was their 19th successive season playing in the Prva HNL.

== First-team squad ==
As of 7 October 2009

Note: Flags indicate national team as defined under FIFA eligibility rules; some limited exceptions apply. Players may hold more than one non-FIFA nationality.

No.	Pos.	Nation	Player
1	GK	CRO	Danijel Subašić
2	MF	CRO	Jure Obšivač
3	MF	CRO	Toni Pezo
4	DF	CRO	Anthony Šerić
5	DF	CRO	Jurica Buljat
6	DF	CRO	Ivo Smoje
7	DF	CRO	Hrvoje Vejić
8	MF	CRO	Krešo Ljubičić
9	FW	CRO	Ahmad Sharbini
10	MF	BIH	Senijad Ibričić
11	MF	CRO	Srđan Andrić (captain)
12	GK	CRO	Vjekoslav Tomić
13	FW	CRO	Ante Vukušić
14	MF	CRO	Marin Tomasov
15	FW	CRO	Mario Sačer
16	DF	BRA	Thiaguinho (on loan from Grêmio)

No.	Pos.	Nation	Player
17	DF	CRO	Ivan Strinić
18	MF	CRO	Mirko Oremuš
19	DF	CRO	Marijan Buljat
20	MF	AUS	Josip Skoko (vice-captain)
21	FW	CRO	Ivan Rodić
22	DF	CRO	Mario Maloča
23	DF	CRO	Ante Aračić
24	MF	CRO	Mario Tičinović
25	GK	CRO	Dante Stipica
26	MF	CRO	Goran Rubil
28	DF	BIH	Boris Pandža
29	MF	CRO	Dario Jertec
30	FW	BRA	Rafael Paraíba (on loan from Grêmio)
50	MF	ROU	Florin Cernat
90	FW	CRO	Duje Čop
99	MF	CRO	Anas Sharbini

== Competitions ==
=== Overall record ===
Performance by competition
Competition	Starting round	Final position/round	First match	Last match
Prva HNL	—N/a	Runners-up	25 July 2009	13 May 2010
Croatian Football Cup	First round	Winners	23 September 2009	5 May 2010
UEFA Europa League	Third qualifying round		30 July 2009	6 August 2009

Statistics by competition
Competition	Pld	W	D	L	GF	GA	GD	Win%
Prva HNL	30	17	7	6	50	21	+29	56.67
Croatian Football Cup	8	6	2	0	19	6	+13	75.00
UEFA Europa League	2	0	1	1	1	2	−1	0.00
Total	40	23	10	7	70	29	+41	57.50

=== Prva HNL ===
==== Classification ====
Pos	Team	Pld	W	D	L	GF	GA	GD	Pts	Qualification or relegation
1	Dinamo Zagreb (C)	30	18	8	4	70	20	+50	62	Qualification to Champions League second qualifying round
2	Hajduk Split	30	17	7	6	50	21	+29	58	Qualification to Europa League third qualifying round (Note: Hajduk Split won the 2009–10 Croatian Cup and thus qualified for the third qualifying round of the 2010–11 UEFA Europa League.)
3	Cibalia	30	16	9	5	46	20	+26	57	Qualification to Europa League second qualifying round
4	Šibenik	30	14	8	8	34	37	−3	50	Qualification to Europa League first qualifying round
5	Osijek	30	13	8	9	49	36	+13	47	

Source: Sportnet.hr
Rules for classification: 1) points; 2) goal difference; 3) number of goals scored.
For deciding champions, qualification to UEFA Europa League and relegation: 1st points; 2nd head-to-head points; 3rd head-to-head goal difference; 4th head-to-head away goals scored.
(C) Champions

==== Results summary ====
Overall								Home						Away					
Pld	W	D	L	GF	GA	GD	Pts	W	D	L	GF	GA	GD	W	D	L	GF	GA	GD
30	17	7	6	50	21	+29	58	11	2	2	30	8	+22	6	5	4	20	13	+7

Last updated: 13 May 2010.
Source: Sportnet.hr

==== Results by round ====
Round	1	2	3	4	5	6	7	8	9	10	11	12	13	14	15	16	17	18	19	20	21	22	23	24	25	26	27	28	29	30
Ground	A	H	A	H	A	H	A	H	A	A	H	A	H	A	H	H	A	H	A	H	A	H	A	H	H	A	H	A	H	A
Result	D	L	L	D	L	W	W	W	D	W	L	L	W	D	W	W	W	W	W	D	L	W	D	W	W	W	W	D	W	W
Position	6	12	13	13	14	14	12	8	9	7	9	10	9	8	7	7	7	5	4	4	5	5	5	4	3	2	2	3	3	2

Source: Competitive matches
A = Away; H = Home; W = Win; D = Draw; L = Loss

==== Results by opponent ====
Team	Results		Points
Team	1	2	Points
Cibalia	0–0	2–1	4
Croatia Sesvete	6–0	5–2	6
Dinamo Zagreb	2–1	0–0	4
Inter Zaprešić	2–2	3–0	4
Istra 1961	1–0	1–0	6
Karlovac	0–1	1–0	3
Lokomotiva	1–0	1–2	3
Međimurje	1–1	4–1	4
Osijek	1–1	1–0	4
Rijeka	0–2	1–1	1
Šibenik	0–1	1–0	3
Slaven Belupo	1–2	5–0	3
Varteks	3–0	2–0	6
Zadar	0–1	2–1	3
NK Zagreb	2–0	1–1	4

Source: 2009–10 Croatian First Football League article

== Matches ==
=== Friendlies ===
==== Pre-season ====
Match	Date	Venue	Opponent	Score	Attendance	Hajduk Scorers	Report
1	19 Jun	H	Libya U–21	1 – 1	0	Oremuš	HRnogomet.com
2	25 Jun	A (Austria)	Stein Allerheiligen (Austria)	3 – 2	600	Tomasov, Brkljača, Vukušić	HRnogomet.com
3	27 Jun	A (Slovenia)	Nafta Lendava (Slovenia)	0 – 1	2,000		HRnogomet.com
4	1 Jul	N (Slovenia)	Baku (Azerbaijan)	1 – 1	100	Rafael Paraíba	HRnogomet.com
5	3 Jul	A (Slovenia)	Domžale (Slovenia)	1 – 0	500	Ibričić	HRnogomet.com
6	8 Jul	N (Austria)	Ried (Austria)	2 – 1	2,500	Gabrić, Ibričić	HRnogomet.com
7	11 Jul	A (Austria)	Vorwärts Steyr (Austria)	3 – 1	3,500	Ibričić, Tomasov (2)	hajduk.hr
8	22 Jul	A	Dugopolje	2 – 0	5,300	Ibričić, Cernat	hajduk.hr

===== Trokut turnir (18 July) =====
Match	Venue	Opponent	Score	Attendance	Hajduk Scorers	Report
1	H	Nacional (Portugal)	0 – 1	7,000		hajduk.hr
2	H	Blackburn (England)	1 – 0	8,000	Ibričić	hajduk.hr

==== On-season ====
Match	Date	Venue	Opponent	Score	Attendance	Hajduk Scorers	Report
1	11 Aug	A	RNK Split	2 – 1	5,000	Vejić, Vukušić	hajduk.hr
2	3 Sep	A	Solin	0 – 1	1,500		hajduk.hr
3	15 Sep	H	British Army (United Kingdom)	9 – 1	500	Rodić, Smoje (2), Jertec (2), Sačer, Tokić, Barač	hajduk.hr
4	6 Oct	A	Urania Baška Voda	0 – 0 (abd.)	–		hajduk.hr
5	14 Nov	H	Poljičanin 1921	4 – 0	No reports for this match		
5	17 Nov	A	Primorac (BnM)	2 – 1	2,500	Tomasov, Čop	hajduk.hr

==== Mid-season ====
Match	Date	Venue	Opponent	Score	Attendance	Hajduk Scorers	Report
1	20 Jan	N (Spain)	Málaga B (Spain)	3 – 1	–	Vukušić, Lendrić, Ah. Sharbini	hajduk.hr
2	23 Jan	N (Spain)	Arka Gdynia (Poland)	1 – 2	50	Lendrić	hajduk.hr
3	26 Jan	N (Spain)	Young Boys (Switzerland)	2 – 1	50	Ibričić, Čop	hajduk.hr
4	29 Jan	N (Spain)	Austria Wien	3 – 3	50	Vukušić (2), Tomasov	hajduk.hr
5	30 Jan	N (Spain)	Legia Warsaw (Poland)	1 – 0	50	Ah. Sharbini	hajduk.hr
6	10 Feb	A	Junak Sinj	3 – 2	1,000	Livaja, Matas (o.g.), Tomasov	hajduk.hr
7	13 Feb	H	Željezničar (Bosnia and Herzegovina)	0 – 0	6,500		hajduk.hr
8	17 Feb	A	Glavice	6 – 1	800	Vukušić (4), Zulim, Jozinović	hajduk.hr
9	18 Feb	A	Primorac (BnM)	3 – 3	600	Ah. Sharbini, Mišlov (o.g.), Ibričić	hajduk.hr
10	21 Feb	N	Zadar	1 – 2	1,500	Tomasov	hajduk.hr

=== Prva HNL ===
25 July 2009 1	Osijek	1–1	Hajduk Split	Osijek
20:15 CEST (UTC+02:00)	Pranjić (yellow card) 5'; Todorčev (yellow card) 18'; Jugović 56'; Knežević (yellow card) 74'	Report	Vukušić (yellow card) 12'; Skoko (yellow card) 43'; Šerić (yellow card) 69'; Pranjić 87' (o.g.)	Stadium: Stadion Gradski vrt Attendance: 5,000; Referee: Marin Mlinar (Zagreb)

2 August 2009 2	Hajduk Split	0–1	Zadar	Split
20:00 CEST (UTC+02:00)	Smoje (yellow card) 56'; J. Buljat (yellow card) 58'	Report	Bečiri (yellow card) 34'; M. Ljubičić (yellow card) 42'; Šaranović (yellow card) 61' (goal) 68'; Puljić (yellow card) 62'; Ježina (yellow card) 86'; Ćurjurić (yellow card) 87'	Stadium: Stadion Poljud; Attendance: 0 Referee: Ivo Krečak (Šibenik)

9 August 2009 3	Slaven Belupo	2–1	Hajduk Split	Koprivnica
20:15 CEST (UTC+02:00)	Poldrugač (yellow card) 38'; Jurić (yellow card) 48' (goal) 71'; Kokalović (yellow card) 54'; Posavec 69'; Vojnović (yellow card) 79'	Report	Ibričić (yellow card) 33' (goal) 38'; Rodić (yellow card) 42'; Tičinović (yellow card) 48'; Pandža (yellow card) 64'; Smoje (yellow card) 90+1'	Stadium: Gradski stadion Attendance: 3,000; Referee: Alan Gerek (Zabok)

15 August 2009 4	Hajduk Split	2–2	Inter Zaprešić	Split
20:00 CEST (UTC+02:00)	Ibričić (yellow card) 21' (goal) 69' (pen.); Tičinović 31'; Skoko (yellow card) 90'	Report	Šarić (yellow card) 10' (goal) 22'; Jonjić 18'; Buden (yellow card) 81'	Stadium: Stadion Poljud; Attendance: 3,500; Referee: Domagoj Vučkov (Rijeka)

23 August 2009 5	Rijeka	2–0	Hajduk Split	Rijeka
20:15 CEST (UTC+02:00)	Fernández 14' (pen.), 34' (pen.) (yellow card) 35'; A. Pamić (yellow card) 22'; Budicin (yellow card) 87'	Report	Subašić (yellow card) 13'; An. Sharbini (yellow card) 37'	Stadium: Stadion Kantrida; Attendance: 7,000; Referee: Damir Batinić (Osijek)

29 August 2009 6	Hajduk Split	1–0	Lokomotiva	Split
20:00 CEST (UTC+02:00)	Ibričić 59' (pen.) (yellow card) 86'; K. Ljubičić (yellow card) 77'	Report	Herceg (yellow card) 28'; Musa (yellow card) 31'; Vrsaljko (yellow card) 51'; Antolić (yellow card) 85'	Stadium: Stadion Poljud; Attendance: 6,000; Referee: Danijel Trampus (Osijek)

13 September 2009 7	Varteks	0–3	Hajduk Split	Varaždin
19:00 CEST (UTC+02:00)	Ivančić (yellow card) 10'; Punčec (yellow card) 38'; Krklec (yellow card) 84'	Report	Maloča (yellow card) 18'; Čop (yellow card) 22'; Oremuš 30'; Šerić 53'; Rodić (yellow card) 74'; An. Sharbini 84' (pen.)	Stadium: Stadion Varteks; Attendance: 3,000; Referee: Ivan Bebek (Rijeka)

19 September 2009 8	Hajduk Split	2–0	NK Zagreb	Split
20:30 CEST (UTC+02:00)	An. Sharbini 54'; Pandža 64'	Report	Parlov (yellow card) 29'	Stadium: Stadion Poljud; Attendance: 8,000; Referee: Goran Proleta (Opuzen)

27 September 2009 9	Cibalia	0–0	Hajduk Split	Vinkovci
19:00 CEST (UTC+02:00)	Milardović (yellow card) 15'; Tomić (yellow card) 55'; I. Grgić (yellow card) 64'	Report	Skoko (red card) 22'	Stadium: Stadion HNK Cibalia; Attendance: 7,000; Referee: Domagoj Vučkov (Rijeka)

3 October 2009 10	Istra 1961	0–1	Hajduk Split	Rijeka
20:30 CEST (UTC+02:00)	Marković (yellow card) 75'	Report	Vukušić 22'	Stadium: Stadion Kantrida; Attendance: 2,500; Referee: Draženko Kovačić (Križevci)

18 October 2009 11	Hajduk Split	0–1	Šibenik	Split
20:15 CEST (UTC+02:00)		Report	Bačelić-Grgić (yellow card) 19'; Zec 43'; Alispahić (yellow card) 45'; Božić (yellow card) 83'; Blažević (yellow card) 90'	Stadium: Stadion Poljud; Attendance: 5,000; Referee: Andrej Burilo (Osijek)

24 October 2009 12	Karlovac	1–0	Hajduk Split	Karlovac
20:45 CEST (UTC+02:00)	Redžepi 72'; Lajtman (yellow card) 84'	Report	Smoje (yellow card) 45+1'; An. Sharbini (yellow card) 79'; Andrić (yellow card) 86'	Stadium: Stadion Branko Čavlović-Čavlek; Attendance: 5,000; Referee: Igor Pristovnik (Zagreb)

31 October 2009 13	Hajduk Split	2–1	Dinamo Zagreb	Split
18:00 CET (UTC+01:00)	Lovren 44' (o.g.); Strinić 48'; Pandža (yellow card) 54' (yellow-red card) 55'; Vejić (yellow card) 73'; M. Buljat (yellow card) 90'	Report	Sivonjić 45'; Slepička (yellow card) 50'; Sammir (red card) 90+3'	Stadium: Stadion Poljud; Attendance: 4,000; Referee: Damir Batinić (Osijek)

7 November 2009 14	Međimurje	1–1	Hajduk Split	Čakovec
20:30 CET (UTC+01:00)	Golubović 36'; Eliomar (yellow card) 39'; Melnjak (yellow card) 89'	Report	J. Buljat (yellow card) 25'; Šerić (yellow card) 31'; Ibričić 7' (yellow card) 90+2'	Stadium: Stadion SRC Mladost; Attendance: 3,500; Referee: Vlado Svilokos (Sisak)

21 November 2009 15	Hajduk Split	6–0	Croatia Sesvete	Split
20:30 CET (UTC+01:00)	Vejić 20'; Ibričić 43', 73'; Rafael Paraíba 52' (yellow card) 55'; Vukušić 76'; An. Sharbini 83' (pen.)	Report	Radoš (yellow card) 20'; Čižmek (yellow card) 33'; Tominac (yellow card) 75'	Stadium: Stadion Poljud; Attendance: 3,000; Referee: Šime Bugarija (Bibinje)

28 November 2009 16	Hajduk Split	1–0	Osijek	Split
20:15 CET (UTC+01:00)	Šerić (yellow card) 73'; Ibričić 85' (pen.)	Report	Kurtović (yellow card) 63'; Šorša (yellow card) 81'	Stadium: Stadion Poljud; Attendance: 4,000; Referee: Ivan Bebek (Rijeka)

5 December 2009 17	Zadar	1–2	Hajduk Split	Zadar
15:30 CET (UTC+01:00)	Ćurjurić (yellow card) 18'; Bilaver (yellow card) 20'; Mršić 71'; Mitrović (yellow card) 80'	Report	Skočibušić 2' (o.g.); Strinić (yellow card) 58'; Čop 68'	Stadium: Stadion Stanovi; Attendance: 4,000; Referee: Dalibor Mlakar (Zagreb)

28 February 2010 18	Hajduk Split	5–0	Slaven Belupo	Split
16:00 CET (UTC+01:00)	Andrić 49' (yellow card) 59'; Tomasov 53'; Vukušić 64'; Strinić 73'; Cernat 82'	Report	Kokalović (yellow card) 70'	Stadium: Stadion Poljud; Attendance: 6,000; Referee: Dalibor Mlakar (Zagreb)

6 March 2010 19	Inter Zaprešić	0–3	Hajduk Split	Zaprešić
15:00 CET (UTC+01:00)	Balić (yellow card) 13'; Golem (yellow card) 15'	Report	Strinić 18'; Ibričić 60', 82'	Stadium: Stadion ŠRC Zaprešić; Attendance: 3,000; Referee: Draženko Kovaćić (Križevci)

13 March 2010 20	Hajduk Split	1–1	Rijeka	Split
20:15 CET (UTC+01:00)	Jonjić (yellow card) 67'; Skoko 73'Oremuš (yellow card) 77'; Ibričić (yellow card) 83'	Report	A. Pamić (yellow card) 57'; Lazarevski (yellow card) 80'; Kreilach 88'	Stadium: Stadion Poljud; Attendance: 10,000; Referee: Andrej Burilo (Osijek)

20 March 2010 21	Lokomotiva	2–1	Hajduk Split	Zagreb
15:00 CET (UTC+01:00)	Rubil 9' (o.g.); Martinac (yellow card) 29'; Bule 45' (pen.); Horvat (yellow card) 61'; Sopić (yellow card) 62'	Report	Vukušić 16'; M. Ljubičić (yellow card) 69'; Andrić (yellow card) 90+1'	Stadium: Stadion Maksimir; Attendance: 1,100; Referee: Vlado Svilokos (Sisak)

27 March 2010 22	Hajduk Split	2–0	Varteks	Split
15:00 CET (UTC+01:00)	Vukušić 42' (yellow card) 61'; Ibričić 52'; Rubil (yellow card) 69'	Report	Golubar (yellow card) 17'	Stadium: Stadion Poljud; Attendance: 4,000; Referee: Bruno Marić (Daruvar)

2 April 2010 23	NK Zagreb	1–1	Hajduk Split	Zagreb
18:00 CEST (UTC+02:00)	Krstanović (yellow card) 39'; Tokić (yellow card) 81'; Ljubojević 84'; Dedić (yellow card) 87'; Celjak (yellow card) 90'	Report	Skoko (yellow card) 9'; M. Ljubičić (yellow card) 36'; Strinić 52' (yellow card) 85'; Subašić (yellow card) 84'	Stadium: Stadion Kranjčevićeva; Attendance: 5,000; Referee: Alen Gerek (Zabok)

10 April 2010 24	Hajduk Split	2–1	Cibalia	Split
20:00 CEST (UTC+02:00)	Tičinović 66'; Jozinović (yellow card) 76'; Vukušić 86'	Report	Radotić (yellow card) 5'; Milardović (yellow card) 19'; Kresinger 63'	Stadium: Stadion Poljud; Attendance: 4,000; Referee: Draženko Kovačić (Križevci)

14 April 2010 25	Hajduk Split	1–0	Istra 1961	Split
18:00 CEST (UTC+02:00)	Ibričić 78'	Report		Stadium: Stadion Poljud; Attendance: 4,000; Referee: Marko Matoc (Zaprešić)

17 April 2010 26	Šibenik	0–1	Hajduk Split	Šibenik
20:15 CEST (UTC+02:00)	Zec (yellow card) 90+2'	Report	Ibričić 53'; Oremuš (yellow card) 56'; M. Ljubičić (yellow card) 66'; Jozinović (yellow card) 78'	Stadium: Stadion Šubićevac; Attendance: 4,000; Referee: Domagoj Ljubičić (Osijek)

24 April 2010 27	Hajduk Split	1–0	Karlovac	Split
18:00 CEST (UTC+02:00)	Ibričić 77' (pen.)	Report	Lajtman (yellow card) 49'; Bunoza (yellow card) 77'; Z. Pamić (yellow card) 82'	Stadium: Stadion Poljud; Attendance: 3,500; Referee: Domagoj Ljubičić (Osijek)

1 May 2010 28	Dinamo Zagreb	0–0	Hajduk Split	Zagreb
20:15 CEST (UTC+02:00)	Ibáñez (yellow card) 64'; Etto (yellow card) 71'	Report	Strinić (yellow card) 23'; Cernat (yellow card) 85'	Stadium: Stadion Maksimir; Attendance: 13,000; Referee: Vlado Svilokos (Sisak)

8 May 2010 29	Hajduk Split	4–1	Međimurje	Split
18:00 CEST (UTC+02:00)	Jozinović 45+1'; Tomasov 56'; Čop 70'; Ibričić 78'; M. Ljubičić (yellow card) 90'	Report	M. Grgić 81'; Kovač (yellow card) 85'	Stadium: Stadion Poljud; Attendance: 4,500; Referee: Davor Grizelj (Vinkovci)

13 May 2010 30	Croatia Sesvete	2–5	Hajduk Split	Zagreb
17:00 CEST (UTC+02:00)	Zubak 27'; Agić (yellow card) 41'; Pejić 89'	Report	Ibričić 42', 78', 90+1' (penalty missed) 78'; Cernat 49'; Čop 87'	Stadium: Stadion Kranjčevićeva; Attendance: 800; Referee: Damir Batinić (Osijek)

Source: HRnogomet.com

=== Croatian Football Cup ===
23 September 2009 R1	Lipik	3–5	Hajduk Split	Lipik
15:30 CEST (UTC+02:00)	Šepović (yellow card) 26'; Šimunović 24', 42'; Baltić (yellow card) 38' (goal) 44'	Report	Ibričić 26' (pen.), 59', 72'; Šerić (yellow card) 43'; Cernat 55'; Vejić (yellow card) 58'; Vukušić 76'	Stadium: Stadion NK Lipik; Attendance: 3,000; Referee: Domagoj Ljubičić (Osijek)

28 October 2009 R2	Hajduk Split	5–1	Moslavina	Split
17:00 CET (UTC+01:00)	Čop 19', 63', 78'; Tičinović 37'; Jertec 71'	Report	Iveković 35'	Stadium: Stadion Poljud; Attendance: 2,500; Referee: Mario Zebec (Cestica)

25 November 2009 QF	NK Zagreb	0–0	Hajduk Split	Zagreb
16:00 CET (UTC+01:00)	Oršulić (yellow card) 43'	Report	Pandža (yellow card) 30'; Šerić (yellow card) 34'; Andrić (yellow card) 43'; Ibričić (yellow card) 50'; Vejić (yellow card) 59' (yellow-red card) 83'	Stadium: Stadion Kranjčevićeva; Attendance: 2,500; Referee: Ivan Bebek (Rijeka)

9 December 2009 QF	Hajduk Split	4–1 (4–1 agg.)	NK Zagreb	Split
16:00 CET (UTC+01:00)	Vejić (yellow card) 30'; Tičinović 39', 53'; Andrić 58' (yellow card) 77'; Ibričić 74'	Report	Celjak (yellow card) 42'; Jurendić 69'; Pavlović (yellow card) 90'	Stadium: Stadion Poljud; Attendance: 4,000; Referee: Vlado Svilokos (Sisak)

24 March 2010 SF	Dinamo Zagreb	0–0	Hajduk Split	Zagreb
17:30 CET (UTC+01:00)	Mandžukić (yellow card) 63'; Barbarić (yellow card) 83'	Report	J. Buljat (yellow card) 75' (yellow-red card) 80'	Stadium: Stadion Maksimir; Attendance: 13,000; Referee: Igor Križarić (Čakovec)

7 April 2010 SF	Hajduk Split	1–0 (1–0 agg.)	Dinamo Zagreb	Split
17:30 CEST (UTC+02:00)	Ibričić 51'	Report	Cufré (yellow card) 73'; Barbarić (yellow card) 79'	Stadium: Stadion Poljud; Attendance: 30,000; Referee: Andrej Burilo (Osijek)

21 April 2010 Final	Hajduk Split	2–1	Šibenik	Split
17:30 CEST (UTC+02:00)	Ibričić (penalty missed) 45' 88'; Tičinović 62'; M. Ljubičić (yellow card) 72'; Vukušić (yellow card) 90'	Report	Bulat (yellow card) 23'; Zec 65' (pen.); Elez (yellow card) 74'; Husmani (yellow card) 83'; Budiša (yellow card) 84'; Alispahić (yellow card) 87'	Stadium: Stadion Poljud; Attendance: 15,000; Referee: Draženko Kovačić (Križevci)

5 May 2010 Final	Šibenik	0–2 (1–4 agg.)	Hajduk Split	Šibenik
17:30 CEST (UTC+02:00)	Bloudek (yellow card) 39'; Zec (yellow card) 89'; Bulat (yellow card) 90+2'	Report	Vukušić 16'; Skoko (yellow card) 78'; Ibričić 90+3' (pen.)	Stadium: Stadion Šubićevac; Attendance: 5,500; Referee: Domagoj Vučkov (Rijeka)

Source: HRnogomet.com

=== Europa League ===
==== Third qualifying round ====
30 July 2009 First leg	Žilina (Slovakia)	1–1	(Croatia) Hajduk Split	Žilina, Slovakia
19:30 CEST (UTC+02:00)	Guldan (yellow card) 45'; Mráz (yellow card) 54'; Kobylík 73' (pen.); Piaček (yellow card) 88'	Report	Maloča (yellow card) 24'; Šerić (yellow card) 30'; Brkljača (yellow card) 45'; Rafael Paraíba 52'; Rubil (yellow card) 72'	Stadium: Štadión pod Dubňom; Attendance: 6,000; Referee: Anastassios Kakos (Greece)

6 August 2009 Second leg	Hajduk Split (Croatia)	0–1 (1–2 agg.)	(Slovakia) Žilina	Split, Croatia
21:00 CEST (UTC+02:00)	Rubil (yellow card) 3'; Ibričić (yellow card) 64'	Report	Kobylík (yellow card) 39'; Oravec (yellow card) 57'; Lietava (yellow card) 70' (goal) 76'; Pečalka (yellow card) 78'	Stadium: Stadion Poljud; Attendance: 25,000; Referee: Bas Nijhuis (Netherlands)

Source: uefa.com

== Player seasonal records ==
Competitive matches only. Updated to games played 13 May 2010.

=== Top scorers ===
Rank	Name	League	Europe	Cup	Total
1	(Bosnia and Herzegovina) Senijad Ibričić	17	–	7	24
2	(Croatia) Ante Vukušić	6	–	2	8
3	(Croatia) Duje Čop	3	–	3	6
3	(Croatia) Mario Tičinović	2	–	4	6
5	(Croatia) Ivan Strinić	4	–	–	4
6	(Croatia) Anas Sharbini	3	–	–	3
6	(Romania) Florin Cernat	2	–	1	3
8	(Croatia) Marin Tomasov	2	–	–	2
8	(Croatia) Srđan Andrić	1	–	1	2
8	(Brazil) Rafael Paraíba	1	1	–	2
11	(Croatia) Goran Jozinović	1	–	–	1
11	(Croatia) Mirko Oremuš	1	–	–	1
11	(Bosnia and Herzegovina) Boris Pandža	1	–	–	1
11	(Australia) Josip Skoko	1	–	–	1
11	(Croatia) Anthony Šerić	1	–	–	1
11	(Croatia) Hrvoje Vejić	1	–	–	1
11	(Croatia) Dario Jertec	–	–	1	1
	Own goals	3	–	–	3
	TOTALS	50	1	19	70

Source: Competitive matches

=== Appearances and goals ===
No.	Pos	Nat	Player	Total		Prva HNL		Europa League		Croatian Cup	
No.	Pos	Nat	Player	Apps	Goals	Apps	Goals	Apps	Goals	Apps	Goals
1	GK	(Croatia) CRO	Danijel Subašić	36	0	28	0	2	0	6	0
2	MF	(Croatia) CRO	Jure Obšivač	20	0	20	0	0	0	0	0
2	MF	(Croatia) CRO	Franko Andrijašević	1	0	1	0	0	0	0	0
3	MF	(Croatia) CRO	Toni Pezo	3	0	1	0	2	0	0	0
4	DF	(Croatia) CRO	Anthony Šerić	16	1	11	1	2	0	3	0
5	DF	(Croatia) CRO	Jurica Buljat	17	0	12	0	0	0	5	0
6	DF	(Croatia) CRO	Ivo Smoje	6	0	4	0	0	0	2	0
7	DF	(Croatia) CRO	Hrvoje Vejić	15	1	12	1	0	0	3	0
8	MF	(Croatia) CRO	Krešo Ljubičić	8	0	6	0	0	0	2	0
9	FW	(Croatia) CRO	Ahmad Sharbini	10	0	9	0	0	0	1	0
10	MF	(Bosnia and Herzegovina) BIH	Senijad Ibričić	38	24	29	17	2	0	7	7
11	MF	(Croatia) CRO	Srđan Andrić	22	2	15	1	1	0	6	1
12	GK	(Croatia) CRO	Vjekoslav Tomić	3	0	1	0	0	0	2	0
13	FW	(Croatia) CRO	Ante Vukušić	30	8	22	6	3	0	5	2
14	MF	(Croatia) CRO	Marin Tomasov	29	2	20	2	2	0	7	0
15	MF	(Croatia) CRO	Drago Gabrić	4	0	2	0	2	0	0	0
16	DF	(Croatia) CRO	Goran Jozinović	5	1	5	1	0	0	0	0
17	DF	(Croatia) CRO	Ivan Strinić	29	4	22	4	1	0	6	0
18	MF	(Croatia) CRO	Mirko Oremuš	34	1	26	1	2	0	6	0
19	DF	(Croatia) CRO	Marijan Buljat	9	0	6	0	1	0	2	0
20	MF	(Australia) AUS	Josip Skoko	31	1	23	1	2	0	6	0
21	FW	(Croatia) CRO	Ivan Rodić	7	0	5	0	2	0	0	0
22	DF	(Croatia) CRO	Mario Maloča	28	0	20	0	2	0	6	0
24	MF	(Croatia) CRO	Mario Tičinović	24	6	17	2	0	0	7	4
25	GK	(Croatia) CRO	Dante Stipica	1	0	1	0	0	0	0	0
26	MF	(Croatia) CRO	Goran Rubil	26	0	19	0	2	0	5	0
27	MF	(Croatia) CRO	Mario Brkljača	2	0	0	0	2	0	0	0
27	DF	(Croatia) CRO	Matej Jonjić	2	0	2	0	0	0	0	0
28	DF	(Bosnia and Herzegovina) BIH	Boris Pandža	27	1	19	1	2	0	6	0
29	MF	(Croatia) CRO	Dario Jertec	3	1	1	0	0	0	2	1
30	FW	(Brazil) BRA	Rafael Paraíba	11	2	7	1	2	1	2	0
30	MF	(Croatia) CRO	Marin Ljubičić	12	0	9	0	0	0	3	0
50	MF	(Romania) ROU	Florin Cernat	31	3	25	2	2	0	4	1
90	FW	(Croatia) CRO	Duje Čop	14	6	10	3	0	0	4	3
99	MF	(Croatia) CRO	Anas Sharbini	25	3	21	3	0	0	4	0

== See also ==
- 2009–10 Croatian First Football League
- 2009–10 Croatian Football Cup

== External sources ==
- 2009–10 Prva HNL at HRnogomet.com
- 2009–10 Croatian Cup at HRnogomet.com
- 2009–10 UEFA Europa League at rsssf.com
