= List of Croatian football transfers summer 2010 =

This is a list of Croatian football transfers for the 2010 summer transfer window. Only moves featuring at least one Prva HNL club are listed.

== Transfers ==
=== Dinamo Zagreb ===
==== In ====
Date	Name	Nat.	Age	Moving from	Fee (€)	Contract	Source
27 April	Dario Šimić	(Croatia)	34	AS Monaco	Free transfer	Indefinite	
June	Mathias Chago	(Cameroon)	27	NK Istra 1961	Loan return	1 year	
June	Ilija Sivonjić	(Croatia)	23	NK Inter Zaprešić	Loan return	Undisclosed	
15 June	Arijan Ademi	(Croatia)	19	HNK Šibenik	250,000	7 years	
23 June	Leonard Mesarić	(Croatia)	26	NK Lokomotiva Zagreb	Free transfer	4 years	
16 July	Almir Bekić	(Bosnia and Herzegovina)	21	FK Sloboda Tuzla	100,000	Undisclosed	
26 July	Ante Rukavina	(Croatia)	24	Panathinaikos F.C.	700,000	4 years	
August	Ivan Kelava	(Croatia)	22	NK Lokomotiva Zagreb	Free transfer	5 years	
27 August	Tonel	(Portugal)	30	Sporting Clube de Portugal	Undisclosed	2 years	
29 August	Jakub Sylvestr	(Slovakia)	21	ŠK Slovan Bratislava	650,000	5 years	
30 August	Fatos Beqiraj	(Montenegro)	22	FK Budućnost Podgorica	650,000	5 years	
19 September	Marin Skender	(Croatia)	30	NK Zagreb	Free transfer	3 months	

==== Out ====
Date	Name	Nat.	Age	Moving to	Fee (€)	Contract	Source
28 May	Ivan Turina	(Croatia)	29	Allmänna Idrottsklubben	Free transfer	3 years	
28 May	Ivica Vrdoljak	(Croatia)	26	KP Legia Warszawa	1,500,000	4 years	
1 June	Robert Kovač	(Croatia)	36	—	Retirement	—	
July	Guillermo Suárez	(Argentina)	26	—	Free transfer	—	
July	Karlo Primorac	(Croatia)	26	NK Karlovac	Free transfer	1 year	
16 July	Mario Mandžukić	(Croatia)	24	VfL Wolfsburg	7,000,000	4 years	
August	Gheorghe Andronic	(Moldova)	19	HNK Gorica	Undsiclosed	1 year loan	
August	Domagoj Antolić	(Croatia)	20	NK Lokomotiva Zagreb	Free transfer	Undisclosed	
August	Almir Bekić	(Bosnia and Herzegovina)	21	NK Lokomotiva Zagreb	Free transfer	Undisclosed	
August	Ante Tomić	(Croatia)	27	FC Koper	Free transfer	1 year	
10 August	Dario Šimić	(Croatia)	34	—	Retirement	—	
17 August	Tomislav Butina	(Croatia)	36	—	Retirement	—	
30 August	Ilija Sivonjić	(Croatia)	23	NK Lokomotiva Zagreb	Free transfer	Undisclosed	

==== Summary ====
- Players in: 12
- Players out: 13
- Total expenditure: €2,350,000
  - Domestic transfers: €250,000 (10,64%)
  - International transfers: €2,100,000 (89,36%)
- Total income: €8,500,000
  - Domestic transfers: €0
  - International transfers: €8,500,000 (100,00%)
- Financial outcome: ▲€6,150,000

=== Hajduk Split ===
==== In ====
Date	Name	Nat.	Age	Moving from	Fee (€)	Contract	Source
June	Mario Brkljača	(Croatia)	25	Cagliari Calcio	Loan return	2 years	
June	Lovre Kalinić	(Croatia)	20	NK Novalja	Loan return	3 years	
June	Božidar Radošević	(Croatia)	21	FK Željezničar Sarajevo	Loan return	2 years	
June	Ante Režić	(Croatia)	22	NK Mosor Žrnovnica	Loan return	1 year	
June	Dinko Trebotić	(Croatia)	19	NK Rudeš	Loan return	2 years	
20 August	Ervin Bulku	(Albania)	29	FC Kryvbas Kryvyi Rih	Free transfer	1 year	

==== Out ====
Date	Name	Nat.	Age	Moving to	Fee (€)	Contract	Source
18 May	Goran Rubil	(Croatia)	29	Asteras Tripolis	Free transfer	2 years	
19 May	Josip Skoko	(Australia)	34	Melbourne Heart FC	Free transfer	Undisclosed	
21 May	Ivan Rodić	(Croatia)	24	HNK Rijeka	Free transfer	1 year	
June	Ante Aračić	(Croatia)	24	Al-Faisaly	Free transfer	2 years	
June	Dario Jertec	(Croatia)	28	HNK Šibenik	Free transfer	2 years	
5 June	Miro Varvodić	(Croatia)	21	1. FC Köln	100,000	3 years	
6 June	Ivo Smoje	(Croatia)	31	NK Osijek	Free transfer	3 years	
6 June	Mladen Pelaić	(Croatia)	26	NK Osijek	Free transfer	1 year	
27 June	Florin Cernat	(Romania)	30	Kardemir Karabükspor	Free transfer	2 years	
2 July	Anthony Šerić	(Croatia)	31	Kardemir Karabükspor	Free transfer	2 years	
6 July	Boris Pandža	(Bosnia and Herzegovina)	23	KV Mechelen	350,000	4 years	
5 September	Marko Livaja	(Croatia)	17	FC Lugano	180,000	Undisclosed	
