= 2010 Croatian Football Super Cup =

Dinamo Zagreb	Hajduk Split
1	0
- Date: 17 July 2010
- Venue: Stadion Maksimir, Zagreb
- Referee: Draženko Kovačić (Križevci)
- Attendance: 8,000
- Weather: Clear; 29 °C (84 °F)

The 2010 Croatian Football Super Cup was the ninth edition of the Croatian Football Super Cup, a football match contested by the winners of the previous season's Croatian First League and Croatian Football Cup competitions. The match was played on 17 July 2010 at Stadion Maksimir in Split between 2009–10 Croatian First League winners Dinamo Zagreb and 2009–10 Croatian Football Cup winners Hajduk Split.

== Match details ==
17 July 2010
21:00

Dinamo Zagreb	1–0	Hajduk Split
Bišćan 77'	Report (in Croatian)

Stadion Maksimir, Zagreb
Attendance: 8,000
Referee: Draženko Kovačić (Križevci)

Dinamo Zagreb	Hajduk Split

DINAMO ZAGREB:
GK	1	(Croatia) Tomislav Butina
DF	4	(Croatia) Leonard Mesarić
DF	7	(Brazil) Etto
DF	13	(Croatia) Dario Šimić		(substituted off) 46'
MF	5	(Argentina) Adrián Calello
MF	15	(Cameroon) Mathias Chago
MF	16	(Croatia) Milan Badelj		(substituted off) 74'
MF	22	(Croatia) Igor Bišćan (c)
FW	10	(Brazil) Sammir	(yellow card) 82'
FW	23	(Brazil) Dodô	(yellow card) 67'	(substituted off) 87'
FW	24	(Croatia) Ilija Sivonjić
Substitutes:
DF	19	(Croatia) Tomislav Barbarić		(substituted on) 46'
DF	3	(Argentina) Luis Ibáñez		(substituted on) 74'
MF	77	(Chile) Pedro Morales		(substituted on) 87'
Manager:
(Croatia) Velimir Zajec

HAJDUK SPLIT:
GK	1	(Croatia) Danijel Subašić
DF	5	(Croatia) Jurica Buljat
DF	17	(Croatia) Ivan Strinić
DF	20	(Croatia) Ante Režić	(yellow card) 18'	(substituted off) 88'
DF	22	(Croatia) Mario Maloča
MF	4	(Croatia) Marin Ljubičić		(substituted off) 32'
MF	11	(Croatia) Srđan Andrić (c)
MF	18	(Croatia) Mirko Oremuš
FW	10	(Bosnia and Herzegovina) Senijad Ibričić
FW	90	(Croatia) Duje Čop		(substituted off) 90+1'
FW	99	(Croatia) Anas Sharbini
Substitutes:
MF	21	(Croatia) Mario Brkljača	(yellow card) 34'	(substituted on) 32'
MF	14	(Croatia) Marin Tomasov		(substituted on) 88'
FW	9	(Croatia) Ahmad Sharbini		(substituted on) 90+1'
Manager:
(Croatia) Stanko Poklepović

Assistant referees:
Željko Grgec (Bistra)
Josip Havaić (Koprivnica)

Match rules

- 90 minutes.
- 30 minutes of extra-time if necessary.
- Penalty shoot-out if scores still level
- Seven named substitutes.
- Maximum of three substitutions.
