= List of Croatian football transfers summer 2009 =

This is a list of Croatian football transfers for the 2009 summer transfer window. Only moves featuring at least one Prva HNL club are listed.

== Transfers ==
Date	Name	Moving from	Moving to	Fee	Source
21 May 2009	(Croatia) Dino Drpić	(Croatia) Dinamo Zagreb	(Germany) Karlsruher SC	€900,000	
01 Jun 2009	(Croatia) Mato Jajalo	(Croatia) Slaven Belupo	(Italy) Siena	€2,000,000	Sportnet.hr
07 Jun 2009	(Croatia) Krešo Ljubičić	(Germany) Eintracht Frankfurt	(Croatia) Hajduk Split	Free transfer	Sportnet.hr
09 Jun 2009	(Croatia) Igor Budiša	Free agent	(Croatia) Šibenik	Undisclosed	Sportnet.hr
09 Jun 2009	(Bosnia and Herzegovina) Samir Duro	(Bosnia and Herzegovina) Čelik Zenica	(Croatia) Šibenik	Free transfer	Sportnet.hr
09 Jun 2009	(Croatia) Ninoslav Parmaković	(Croatia) Zadar	(Croatia) Cibalia	Undisclosed	Sportnet.hr
13 Jun 2009	(Hungary) Csaba Csizmadia	(Italy) Grosseto	(Croatia) Slaven Belupo	Undisclosed	Sportnet.hr
15 Jun 2009	(Croatia) Damir Milanović	(Croatia) Šibenik	(Hungary) Fehérvár	Undisclosed	Sportnet.hr
15 Jun 2009	(Croatia) Joško Kovač	(Croatia) Šibenik	(Croatia) Međimurje	Undisclosed	Sportnet.hr
17 Jun 2009	(Bosnia and Herzegovina) Mensur Mujdža	(Croatia) NK Zagreb	(Germany) SC Freiburg	€500,000	Sportnet.hr
17 Jun 2009	(Croatia) Nino Bule	(Greece) Panserraikos	(Croatia) Lokomotiva	Undisclosed	Sportnet.hr
17 Jun 2009	(Croatia) Marko Šimić	(Russia) Khimki	(Croatia) Lokomotiva	Undisclosed	Sportnet.hr
17 Jun 2009	(Croatia) Boris Bajto	(Croatia) Segesta	(Croatia) Lokomotiva	Undisclosed	Sportnet.hr
18 Jun 2009	(Croatia) Ivan Lajtman	(Croatia) Istra 1961	(Croatia) Karlovac	Undisclosed	Sportnet.hr
18 Jun 2009	(Bosnia and Herzegovina) Borislav Pilipović	(Croatia) Istra 1961	(Croatia) Karlovac	Undisclosed	Sportnet.hr
19 Jun 2009	(Croatia) Enes Novinić	(Croatia) Varteks	(Croatia) Karlovac	Undisclosed	Sportnet.hr
19 Jun 2009	(Albania) Emiljano Vila	(Albania) Teuta Durrës	(Croatia) Dinamo Zagreb	Undisclosed	Sportnet.hr
26 Jun 2009	(Greece) Dimitrios Papadopoulos	(Italy) Lecce	(Croatia) Dinamo Zagreb	Undisclosed	Sportnet.hr
26 Jun 2009	(Bosnia and Herzegovina) Dalibor Pandža	(Bosnia and Herzegovina) FK Sarajevo	(Croatia) Dinamo Zagreb	€300,000	Sportnet.hr
28 Jun 2009	(Croatia) Mario Sačer	(Croatia) Varteks	(Croatia) Hajduk Split	Undisclosed	Sportnet.hr
29 Jun 2009	(Croatia) Valentin Babić	(Croatia) Osijek	(Hungary) Győri ETO	Free transfer	Sportnet.hr
29 Jun 2009	(Romania) Florin Cernat	(Ukraine) Dynamo Kyiv	(Croatia) Hajduk Split	Undisclosed	
04 Jul 2009	(Croatia) Josip Tadić	(Croatia) Dinamo Zagreb	(France) Grenoble	Undisclosed	Sportnet.hr
09 Jul 2009	(Croatia) Ivan Rodić	(Croatia) Šibenik	(Croatia) Hajduk Split	€200,000	
17 Jul 2009	(Bosnia and Herzegovina) Mirko Hrgović	(Croatia) Dinamo Zagreb	(Germany) Greuther Fürth	Free Transfer	
21 Jul 2009	(Croatia) Stipe Lapić	(Croatia) Slaven Belupo	(South Korea) Gangwon FC	Free Transfer	sportnet.hr
21 Jul 2009	(Croatia) Siniša Linić	(Croatia) Hajduk Split	(Israel) Bnei Yehuda	Free Transfer	sportnet.hr
03 Aug 2009	(Croatia) Nikola Kalinić	(Croatia) Hajduk Split	(England) Blackburn Rovers	€7,000,000	sportnet.hr
03 Aug 2009	(Serbia) Marjan Marković	Free agent	(Croatia) Istra 1961	Free transfer	
13 Aug 2009	(Croatia) Anas Sharbini	(Croatia) Rijeka	(Croatia) Hajduk Split		
13 Aug 2009	(Croatia) Ahmad Sharbini	(Croatia) Rijeka	(Croatia) Hajduk Split		
19 Aug 2009	(Argentina) Leandro Cufré	(Argentina) La Plata	(Croatia) Dinamo Zagreb	Free Transfer	
