= Marin Ljubičić =

Marin Ljubičić may refer to:

- Marin Ljubičić (footballer, born 1988), Croatian football defensive midfielder
- Marin Ljubičić (footballer, born 2002), Croatian football forward
