= Igor Vidaković =

Croatian footballer

Personal information
- Date of birth: 15 January 1983 (age 43)
- Place of birth: Slavonski Brod, SR Croatia, SFR Yugoslavia
- Height: 1.85 m (6 ft 1 in)
- Position: Goalkeeper

Senior career*
| Years | Team | Apps | (Gls) |
| 2001–2005 | Marsonia | 53 | (0) |
| 2005–2008 | Hrvatski Dragovoljac | 76 | (0) |
| 2008–2011 | Lokomotiva | 33 | (0) |
| 2010 | → Dinamo Zagreb (loan) | 0 | (0) |
| 2011 | → Hrvatski Dragovoljac (loan) | 11 | (0) |
| 2011–2012 | NK Zagreb | 34 | (0) |
| 2013 | SC Ritzing | 9 | (0) |
| 2013–2015 | Maksimir | 23 | (0) |
| 2015 | HAŠK | | |

International career^{‡}
| 2003 | Croatia U20 | 1 | (0) |
| 2004 | Croatia U21 | 3 | (0) |
- * Club domestic league appearances and goals as of 3 April 2013 ‡ National team caps and goals as of 29 May 2004

Igor Vidaković (born 15 January 1983) is a Croatian retired football goalkeeper, who last played for NK HAŠK.

== Club career ==
He had his professional debut at Marsonia in the 2003–04 Prva HNL, when he went on to earn 23 appearances in his first season of top-flight football. Following the club's relegation he established himself as Marsonia's first-choice goalkeeper before being transferred to another second-level club Hrvatski Dragovoljac in July 2005. After three seasons with Dragovoljac he was signed by Lokomotiva in August 2008, and subsequently joined Dinamo Zagreb in January 2010, during the winter break of the 2009–10 season.

He was hired to be Dinamo's third-choice goalkeeper, behind Ivan Kelava and Filip Lončarić. After failing to get any playing time under coach Vahid Halilhodžić Vidaković spent the latter half of the 2010–11 season on loan at Hrvatski Dragovoljac, after which he signed for NK Zagreb. He had a short spell in Austria in 2013.

== International career ==
Internationally, Vidaković was capped four times for Croatia U20 and Croatia U21 between 2003 and 2004.
