= Krešimir Prgomet =

Croatian footballer

Personal information
- Date of birth: June 11, 1986 (age 40)
- Place of birth: Slavonski Brod, SR Croatia, SFR Yugoslavia
- Height: 1.79 m (5 ft 10 in)
- Position: Forward

Senior career*
Years	Team	Apps	(Gls)
2008	Marsonia		
2009	Oriolik		
2008–2009	Graničar Županja		
2009–2012	Cibalia	67	(9)
2012–2013	Istra 1961	15	(1)
2013	Primorac Biograd		
2013	Toronto Croatia	21	(10)
2014–2015	Pajde Möhlin		
- * Club domestic league appearances and goals as of April 30, 2017

Krešimir Prgomet (born June 11, 1986) is a Croatian retired footballer, who most notably played for Croatian top tier-outfit Cibalia.

== Career ==
Prgomet began his career in 2008 with NK Marsonia in the Croatian Third Football League (3. HNL) and later with NK Oriolik. In 2008, he signed with NK Graničar Županja and finished as the top goalscorer in the Western division of the 3. HNL. In 2009, he signed with HNK Cibalia in the Croatian First Football League. During his time with Cibalia he appeared in the 2010–11 UEFA Europa League against Cliftonville F.C. In 2012, he signed with NK Istra 1961 where he appeared in 17 matches and recorded 1 goal.

In 2013, he played with HNK Primorac Biograd na Moru. Shortly after he played abroad with Toronto Croatia in the Canadian Soccer League. He made his debut on May 25, 2013, against London City, where he scored a goal in a 4–1 victory. In his debut season he finished as the club's top goalscorer with 10 goals. He also featured in the postseason against SC Waterloo, where Toronto was eliminated from the competition after losing 5–4 in a penalty shootout. In 2014, he played in Switzerland with NK Pajde Möhlin, where he participated in the Croatian World Club Championship.
