= Matej Jonjić =

Croatian footballer

Personal information
- Date of birth: 29 January 1991 (age 35)
- Place of birth: Split, SR Croatia, Yugoslavia
- Height: 1.87 m (6 ft 2 in)
- Position: Centre back

Team information
- Current team: Tochigi City FC
- Number: 2

Youth career
- Hajduk Split

Senior career*
Years	Team	Apps	(Gls)
2009–2015	Hajduk Split	20	(1)
2009–2010	→ Zadar (loan)	13	(0)
2011–2012	→ Zadar (loan)	26	(0)
2014	→ Osijek (loan)	31	(7)
2015–2016	Incheon United	71	(0)
2017–2020	Cerezo Osaka	135	(11)
2021	Shanghai Shenhua	18	(1)
2022–2024	Cerezo Osaka	48	(1)
2024	Incheon United	29	(1)
2025–	Tochigi City FC	52	(6)

International career^{‡}
2007	Croatia U-16	8	(0)
2007–2008	Croatia U-17	10	(0)
2009	Croatia U-18	6	(0)
2008–2010	Croatia U-19	18	(0)
- * Club domestic league appearances and goals as of 16 August 2026 ‡ National team caps and goals as of 27 July 2010

Matej Jonjić (Croatian pronunciation: [mǎtej jǒːɲitɕ]; born 29 January 1991) is a Croatian professional footballer who plays as centre back for J2 League club, Tochigi City FC.

He has represented Croatia at youth level, having earned caps with all of the youth teams beginning with the Croatia under-16 team.

== Club career ==
Born in Split, Jonjić is a product of the Hajduk Split academy. He was loaned out to NK Zadar in June 2009 where he made his professional debut and went on to appear in 13 matches for Zadar before he returned to Hajduk in January 2010. He later appeared in two matches for Hajduk in the second part of the 2009–10 season. After collecting only seven appearances in competitive matches in the following season, Jonjić was loaned to Zadar for the second time in June 2011.

On 23 January 2025, Jonjić was announce official transfer to J3 promoted club, Tochigi City FC for 2025 season.

== Career statistics ==
=== Club ===
As of the start for 2025 season.

Appearances and goals by club, season and competition
Club	Season	League			National cup		League cup		Continental		Other		Total	
Club	Season	Division	Apps	Goals	Apps	Goals	Apps	Goals	Apps	Goals	Apps	Goals	Apps	Goals
Hajduk Split	2009–10	Prva HNL	2	0	0	0	—		—		—		2	0
Hajduk Split	2010–11	Prva HNL	4	0	0	0	—		2	0	—		6	0
Hajduk Split	2012–13	Prva HNL	11	1	2	0	—		2	0	—		15	1
Hajduk Split	2013–14	Prva HNL	3	0	2	0	—		0	0	—		5	0
Hajduk Split	Total		20	1	4	0	—		4	0	—		28	1
Zadar (loan)	2009–10	Prva HNL	13	0	0	0	—		—		—		13	0
Zadar (loan)	2011–12	Prva HNL	26	0	0	0	—		—		—		26	0
Zadar (loan)	Total		39	0	0	0	—		—		—		39	0
Osijek (loan)	2013–14	Prva HNL	13	3	2	0	—		—		—		15	3
Osijek (loan)	2014–15	Prva HNL	18	4	2	1	—		—		—		20	5
Osijek (loan)	Total		31	7	4	1	—		—		—		35	8
Incheon United	2015	K League Classic	37	0	5	0	—		—		—		42	0
Incheon United	2016	K League Classic	34	0	3	0	—		—		—		37	0
Incheon United	Total		71	0	8	0	—		—		—		79	0
Cerezo Osaka	2017	J1 League	34	6	3	0	5	1	—		—		42	7
Cerezo Osaka	2018	J1 League	33	2	2	0	2	0	4	0	1 (Note: Appearance in Japanese Super Cup)	0	42	2
Cerezo Osaka	2019	J1 League	34	1	2	1	2	0	—		—		38	2
Cerezo Osaka	2020	J1 League	34	2	—		4	0	—		—		38	2
Cerezo Osaka	Total		135	11	7	1	13	1	4	0	1	0	160	13
Shanghai Shenhua	2021	Chinese Super League	18	1	5	0	—		—		—		23	1
Cerezo Osaka	2022	J1 League	26	1	2	1	7	1	—		—		35	3
Cerezo Osaka	2023	J1 League	22	0	2	0	2	0	—		—		26	0
Cerezo Osaka	Total		48	1	4	1	9	1	—		—		61	3
Incheon United	2024	K League 1	29	1	1	0	—		—		—		30	1
Tochigi City FC	2025	J3 League	0	0	0	0	0	0	—		—		0	0
Career total			391	23	33	3	22	2	8	0	1	0	455	28

== Honours ==
Cerezo Osaka

- J.League Cup: 2017
- Emperor's Cup: 2017
- Japanese Super Cup: 2018

=== Individual ===
- K League Best XI: 2015, 2016
- J.League Outstanding player awards: 2017, 2019, 2020
