= Nikola Frljužec =

Croatian footballer

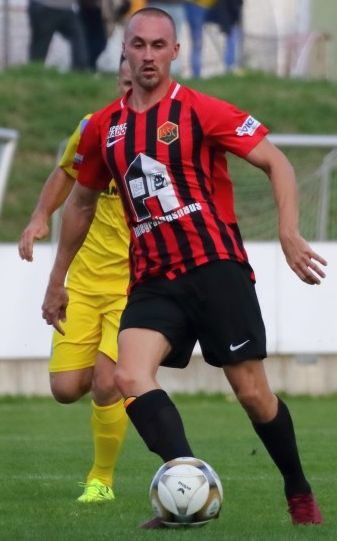

Personal information
- Date of birth: 29 July 1989
- Place of birth: Ptuj, Croatia
- Height: 1.76 m (5 ft 9 1/2 in)
- Position: Forward

Team information
- Current team: Pitten

Youth career
- 1999–2004: Zagorec Krapina
- 2004–2008: Varteks Varazdin

Senior career*
Years	Team	Apps	(Gls)
2008–2010	Varteks Varazdin	15	(1)
2009	→ Sloboda Varaždin (loan)	13	(7)
2010–2011	Hrvatski Dragovoljac	9	(0)
2011	Slaven Belupo	5	(0)
2011–2012	NK Zagreb	22	(2)
2013–2015	SV Lebring	51	(20)
2015–2016	Kalsdorf	42	(10)
2017–2018	Lafnitz	48	(19)
2019–2020	Simmering	37	(25)
2021	Waldbach	11	(7)
2022-	Pitten	13	(8)
- * Club domestic league appearances and goals as of 24 July 2022

Nikola Frljužec (born 29 July 1989 in Ptuj) is a Croatian football player currently playing for Austrian amateur side Pitten.

== Club career ==
He has previously played for NK Zagreb, NK Slaven Belupo, NK Hrvatski Dragovoljac and NK Varazdin, before moving to Austria where he played for several clubs at different levels.

== Honours ==
=== Club ===
SV Lafnitz

- Austrian Regionalliga Central (1) 2017-18
