= Adrian Valentić =

Croatian footballer

Personal information
- Full name: Adrian Valentić
- Date of birth: 10 August 1987 (age 39)
- Place of birth: Zagreb, SR Croatia, SFR Yugoslavia
- Height: 1.85 m (6 ft 1 in)
- Position: Defender

Senior career*
Years	Team	Apps	(Gls)
2006–2007	Mainz 05 II	11	(0)
2007–2008	Varteks	0	(0)
2008–2009	Lokomotiva	4	(0)
2009–2010	Vinodol	0	(0)
2010	Međimurje	9	(1)
2010–2012	Inter Zaprešić	18	(0)
2012–2013	Karlsruher SC II	15	(2)
2013–2014	Rudeš	8	(0)
2014	SHB Đà Nẵng	23	(6)
2015	Can Tho	11	(1)

International career
2005–2006	Croatia U19	12	(0)
- * Club domestic league appearances and goals as of 09:12, 20 June 2014 (UTC)

Adrian Valentić (born 10 August 1987) is a Croatian footballer who plays as a defender.

== Career ==
He left Inter Zaprešić in February 2012.
