= Dinko Trebotić =

Croatian footballer

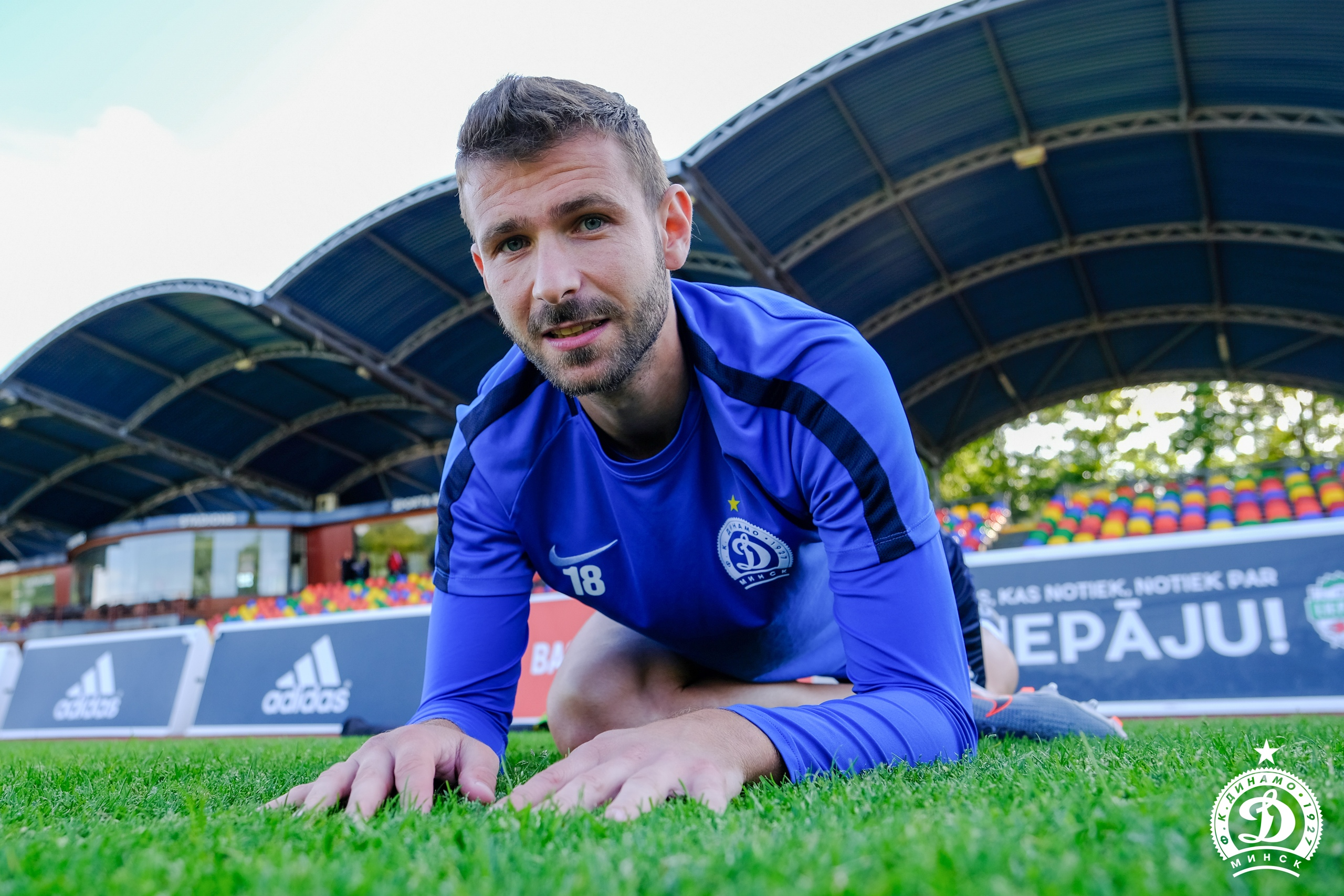

Personal information
- Date of birth: 30 July 1990 (age 36)
- Place of birth: Split, SR Croatia, SFR Yugoslavia
- Height: 1.88 m (6 ft 2 in)
- Position: Midfielder

Team information
- Current team: NK Ravnice
- Number: 23

Youth career
- 1997–2009: Hajduk Split

Senior career*
Years	Team	Apps	(Gls)
2008–2012	Hajduk Split	28	(2)
2009	→ Junak Sinj (loan)	12	(0)
2009–2010	→ Rudeš (loan)	18	(2)
2012	→ NK Zagreb (loan)	9	(1)
2012–2014	Lokomotiva	55	(6)
2014–2016	Videoton	32	(3)
2016–2017	Bnei Yehuda	7	(0)
2017	Fredrikstad	13	(1)
2017–2018	Slaven Belupo	28	(2)
2018–2020	Dinamo Minsk	19	(4)
2020	→ Kaposvár (loan)	11	(0)
2020–2021	Zrinjski Mostar	23	(2)
2021–2022	Águilas	7	(0)
2022–2023	Gloria Buzău	34	(4)
2024	NK Ravnice	8	(5)
2024–	Castelfidardo	2	(0)

International career
2010–2013	Croatia U21	6	(0)
- * Club domestic league appearances and goals as of 17 November 2024

Dinko Trebotić (born 30 July 1990) is a Croatian professional footballer who plays as a midfielder for Italian Serie D club Castelfidardo.

== Career ==
A product of the Hajduk Split academy, Trebotić had his professional debut for the club in the 2008–09 season on 5 October 2008 against Croatia Sesvete under manager Goran Vučević. However, fe failed to impress and it proved to be his only league appearance of the season, as he was loaned to second-tier sides Junak Sinj and Rudeš. After returning from loan in July 2010, Trebotić joined Hajduk's first team for the 2010–11 season and was made a regular in the starting squad under manager Stanko Poklepović. In February 2012, he joined Zagreb on loan for the rest of the 2011–12 season.

After having his contract with Hajdu terminated in August 2012, Trebotić joined Lokomotiva. After two seasons with Lokomotiva, which yielded seven goals and seven assists in 57 matches in all competitions, Trebotić departed Croatia to join Nemzeti Bajnokság I club Videoton, where he signed a four-year deal. His two years with Videoton saw him manage four goals and four assists in 45 matches in all competitions.

In July 2016, Trebotić signed three-year deal with Israeli side Bnei Yehuda. After Bnei Yehuda, he also played for Fredrikstad, Slaven Belupo, Dinamo Minsk and was sent on a loan from Dinamo Minsk to Kaposvár.

On 6 August 2020, Trebotić signed a two-year contract with Bosnian Premier League club Zrinjski Mostar. He made his official debut for Zrinjski on 12 August 2020 in a league match against Radnik Bijeljina. Trebotić scored his first goal for Zrinjski in a league match against Krupa on 28 September 2020. He left Zrinjski in June 2021.

== Honours ==
Lokomotiva Zagreb

- Croatian Cup runner-up: 2012–13

Videoton

- Nemzeti Bajnokság I: 2014–15
- Magyar Kupa runner-up: 2014–15
- Szuperkupa runner-up: 2015
