= Krešo Ljubičić =

Croatian footballer (born 1988)

Personal information
- Date of birth: 26 September 1988 (age 38)
- Place of birth: Hanau, West Germany
- Height: 1.80 m (5 ft 11 in)
- Position: Midfielder

Team information
- Current team: Hanau 93
- Number: 8

Youth career
- Germania Dörnigheim
- 1997–2007: Eintracht Frankfurt

Senior career*
Years	Team	Apps	(Gls)
2007–2009	Eintracht Frankfurt	6	(0)
2009–2015	Hajduk Split	20	(0)
2013–2014	→ Hrvatski Dragovoljac (loan)	23	(1)
2014–2015	→ Hajduk Split II	13	(2)
2015–2016	FC Biel-Bienne	27	(1)
2016–2018	FC Winterthur	39	(0)
2018–2021	Bayern Alzenau	55	(7)
2021–	Hanau 93	25	(2)

International career^{‡}
2004–2005	Croatia U17	11	(2)
2006	Croatia U18	2	(0)
2006–2007	Croatia U19	13	(0)
2008–2009	Croatia U20	2	(0)
2007–2009	Croatia U21	10	(4)

Managerial career
- 2021–: Hanau 93 (player-coach)
- * Club domestic league appearances and goals as of 7 October 2022 ‡ National team caps and goals as of 4 June 2011

Krešo Ljubičić (born 26 September 1988) is a footballer. He is a player-coach with German fifth-tier Hessenliga club Hanau 93. Born in Germany, he represented Croatia at various youth international levels up to the under-21s.

== Club career ==
In 2007–08, Ljubičić joined Eintracht Frankfurt coming from the club's youth academy where he got regular experience at Eintracht Frankfurt U23. In June 2009, he moved to Hajduk Split after his contract in Frankfurt expired.

On 3 February 2021, he joined Hanau 93.

== Career statistics ==
Club	Season	League		Cup		Europe		Total	
Club	Season	Apps	Goals	Apps	Goals	Apps	Goals	Apps	Goals
Eintracht Frankfurt	2007–08	1	0	–		–		1	0
Eintracht Frankfurt	2008–09	5	0	–		–		5	0
Eintracht Frankfurt	Total	6	0	0	0	0	0	6	0
Hajduk Split
Hajduk Split	2009–10	6	0	1	0	–		7	0
Hajduk Split	2010–11	9	0	2	0	–		11	0
Hajduk Split	2011–12	5	0	0	0	1	0	6	0
Hajduk Split	Total	20	0	3	0	1	0	24	0
Career Total		26	0	3	0	1	0	30	0
Last Update: 13 May 2012
