= Elvis Kokalović =

Croatian footballer (born 1988)

Personal information
- Date of birth: 17 July 1988 (age 38)
- Place of birth: Novo Mesto, SFR Yugoslavia
- Height: 1.84 m (6 ft 0 in)
- Position: Defender

Team information
- Current team: Kamen Sirač
- Number: 9

Youth career
- 1998–1999: Dinamo Badljevina
- 1999–2000: Daruvar
- 2001–2002: Lipik
- 2002–2003: Daruvar
- 2003–2007: Slaven Belupo

Senior career*
Years	Team	Apps	(Gls)
2007–2013	Slaven Belupo	140	(5)
2007	→ Koprivnica (loan)		
2013–2015	Konyaspor	39	(0)
2015–2017	Karabükspor	40	(1)
2017	Lech Poznań	0	(0)
2019–2020	Novigrad	13	(0)
2021–	Kamen Sirač	70	(11)

International career
2007	Croatia U19	2	(0)
2008–2009	Croatia U20	5	(0)
2008–2009	Croatia U21	5	(0)
- * Club domestic league appearances and goals as of 14 February 2024

Elvis Kokalović (born 17 July 1988) is a Croatian professional footballer who plays as a defender for Kamen Sirač.

== Club career ==
In February 2018, Kokalović joined NK Novigrad.

== Club statistics ==
As of 21 February 2017.

Appearances and goals by club, season and competition
Club	Season	League			National cup (Note: Includes Croatian Cup, Turkish Cup)		Europe		Total	
Club	Season	Division	Apps	Goals	Apps	Goals	Apps	Goals	Apps	Goals
NK Slaven Belupo	2007–08	1. HNL	14	0	1	0	—		15	0
NK Slaven Belupo	2008–09	1. HNL	24	1	3	0	3 (Note: Appearances in UEFA Cup/UEFA Europa League)	0	30	1
NK Slaven Belupo	2009–10	1. HNL	26	1	4	0	3	0	33	1
NK Slaven Belupo	2010–11	1. HNL	25	3	6	0	—		31	3
NK Slaven Belupo	2011–12	1. HNL	25	0	1	0	—		26	0
NK Slaven Belupo	2012–13	1. HNL	26	0	4	0	4	0	34	0
NK Slaven Belupo	Total		140	5	19	0	10	0	169	5
Konyaspor	2013–14	Süper Lig	14	0	1	0	—		15	0
Konyaspor	2014–15	Süper Lig	25	0	5	0	—		30	0
Konyaspor	Total		39	0	6	0	—		45	0
Kardemir Karabükspor	2015–16	TFF First League	32	1	6	1	—		38	2
Kardemir Karabükspor	2016–17	Süper Lig	8	0	0	0	—		8	0
Kardemir Karabükspor	Total		40	1	6	1	—		46	2
Lech Poznań	2016–17	Ekstraklasa	0	0	0	0	—		0	0
Career total			219	6	31	1	10	0	260	7
