= Ivan Elez =

Croatian football player (born 1981)

Personal information
- Full name: Ivan Elez
- Date of birth: 9 September 1981 (age 45)
- Place of birth: Split, SFR Yugoslavia
- Height: 1.82 m (6 ft 0 in)
- Position: Midfielder

Youth career
- –1994: Omladinac Vranjic
- 1994–1999: Hajduk Split

Senior career*
Years	Team	Apps	(Gls)
1999–2003	Mosor		
2003–2005	Uskok	47	(6)
2005–2007	Slaven Belupo	17	(0)
2007–2008	Zadar	24	(1)
2008	Solin	12	(7)
2009–2011	Šibenik	41	(1)
2011	Dugopolje	9	(0)
2012	Šmartno	9	(0)
2013–2014	Érdi	1	(0)
2014–2016	NK Tehničar 1974		
2016–2017	NK GOŠK Kastel Gomlica		
- * Club domestic league appearances and goals as of 10 August 2010

Ivan Elez (born 9 September 1981) is a Croatian retired footballer.

== Club career ==
Elez was born in Split and started to play football in the mid-1990s at local club NK Omladinac Vranjic. In 1994, he was spotted by Hajduk Split, and started his professional career by joining the club in March of that year. He played for Hajduk until 1999, before moving to then second-division club NK Mosor, originally starting in the reserve team. After two seasons, he was promoted to the first team.

After two seasons with Mosor, he left and signed with NK Uskok, where he played for two seasons with some success. In the summer of 2005, Elez left Uskok and started to play for NK Slaven Belupo in the Croatian First Division, where he remained for two seasons, before joining NK Zadar. Elez remained at Zadar for one season, before leaving to play with Second Division side NK Solin.

After just half a season with Solin, Ivan returned to the first division, signing a contract with HNK Šibenik.
