= Hrvoje Tokić =

Croatian footballer

Personal information
- Date of birth: 17 June 1990 (age 36)
- Place of birth: Zagreb, SR Croatia, SFR Yugoslavia
- Height: 1.89 m (6 ft 2 1/2 in)
- Position: Forward

Team information
- Current team: Ægir
- Number: 9

Youth career
- 1998–2009: Hrvatski Dragovoljac

Senior career*
Years	Team	Apps	(Gls)
2008–2009	Hrvatski Dragovoljac	6	(0)
2009–2012	Hajduk Split	0	(0)
2010–2011	→ Mosor (loan)	18	(3)
2011	→ MV Croatia (loan)	14	(16)
2011–2012	→ Vinogradar (loan)	11	(10)
2012	→ Zadar (loan)	9	(2)
2012–2013	Vinogradar	14	(9)
2013	Leoben	11	(6)
2013–2014	Cibalia	28	(16)
2014–2015	Aris Limassol	10	(4)
2015	Dugopolje	2	(0)
2015–2016	Víkingur Ólafsvík	29	(21)
2017–2018	Breiðablik	21	(5)
2018–2022	Selfoss	69	(58)
2023–	Ægir	2	(0)

International career^{‡}
2008	Croatia U19	9	(5)
- * Club domestic league appearances and goals as of 20 May 2023 ‡ National team caps and goals as of 5 October 2008

Hrvoje Tokić (born 17 June 1990) is a Croatian football forward who plays for Ægir in the 1. deild karla in Iceland. Besides Croatia, he has played in Austria, Cyprus, and Iceland.

== Club career ==
A product of the Hrvatski Dragovoljac academy, Tokić was the top scorer of the autumn part of the 2008–09 season of the Croatian U19 football league, before being pulled to the first team, where he didn't get many chances. Still, his games for the junior team earned him a transfer to the Prva HNL giant Hajduk Split in the summer of 2009. Tokić spent his first season playing for the reserve team, and was subsequently loaned to Druga HNL sides NK Mosor and MV Croatia. While unimpressive on his first loan, he excelled at the latter of the two, scoring a stunning sixteen goals in fourteen matches, becoming the Druga HNL top scorer for the 2010–11 season with a total of 19 goals and helping immensely with saving MV Croatia, who ended up on the bottom of the table after the autumn part of the season, from relegation. Faced with a strong competition in the attack at his main club, Tokić went on loan again to another Druga HNL side, Vinogradar at the beginning of the 2011–12 season. Impressing again with ten goals in eleven matches, Tokić was given in 2012 a chance to play in Prva HNL, on loan at Zadar as a replacement for Ivan Santini. He scored his first goal in Prva HNL in a 2–1 win against Inter Zaprešić on 10 March 2012.

In September 2014, Tokić signed a contract with Aris Limassol.

In January 2017, Tokic signed for Icelandic club Breiðablik, after spending two years at Víkingur Ólafsvík.

In July 2018, Tokic dropped down to 1. deild karla and signed for Selfoss despite his 7 goals in 10 games Selfoss got relegated to 2. deild karla

Tokic was in great form during the 2019 season and scored amazing 22 goals in 20 games but still Selfoss missed out on promotion on the last day of the season by a point.

Despite missing 7 games in an injury hit 2020 season Tokic again proved his worth and scored 15 goals in 15 games including a double in the last game of the season which clinched a promotion back to 1. deild karla for Selfoss.

In October 2022, Selfoss announced that Tokic would not return for the 2023 season.
