= Ivan Lajtman =

Croatian footballer

Personal information
- Full name: Ivan Lajtman
- Date of birth: 1 July 1979 (age 47)
- Place of birth: Đakovo, SFR Yugoslavia
- Height: 1.75 m (5 ft 9 in)
- Position: Midfielder

Senior career*
Years	Team	Apps	(Gls)
1999–2004	Cibalia	78	(6)
2004–2005	Široki Brijeg	13	(1)
2005–2008	NK Zagreb	50	(2)
2008–2009	Istra 1961	31	(2)
2009–2011	Karlovac	26	(4)
2011	Rovinj		
- * Club domestic league appearances and goals as of 2010-05-08

Ivan Lajtman (born 1 July 1979 in Đakovo) is a Croatian retired footballer who last played for NK Rovinj.

== Club career ==
Lajtman previously played for HNK Cibalia and NK Zagreb in the Croatian First League.
