= Ante Režić =

Croatian footballer (born 1988)

Personal information
- Date of birth: 4 June 1988 (age 38)
- Place of birth: Solin, SFR Yugoslavia
- Height: 1.76 m (5 ft 9 1/2 in)
- Positions: Right back; right winger

Youth career
- Hajduk Split

Senior career*
Years	Team	Apps	(Gls)
2007–2012	Hajduk Split	9	(0)
2007–2008	→ Solin (loan)	21	(1)
2008–2009	→ Junak Sinj (loan)	25	(1)
2009–2010	→ Međimurje (loan)	5	(0)
2010	→ Mosor (loan)	12	(1)
2011–2012	→ Šibenik (loan)	3	(0)
2012	→ Varaždin (loan)	0	(0)
2013–2014	Junak Sinj	10	(0)
2014	Konavljanin		
2014–2016	Dugopolje	57	(4)
2017	Imotski	6	(0)
2017-2020	Lupo-Martini	27	(3)

International career
2004–2005	Croatia U17	4	(0)
- * Club domestic league appearances and goals as of 20 March 2017 (UTC)

Ante Režić (born 4 June 1988 in Solin, Yugoslavia) is a Croatian footballer who most recently played for German side USI Lupo-Martini.

== Club career ==
A product of Hajduk Split academy, Režić had several loan spells between 2007 and 2010 at Croatian sides Solin, Junak Sinj, Međimurje and Mosor before debuting for Hajduk in the 2010–11 season under manager Stanko Poklepović.

== International career ==
Režić was also capped 4 times for Croatia under-17s in 2004 and 2005.
