= Marijan Buljat =

Croatian football player

Personal information
- Full name: Marijan Buljat
- Date of birth: 12 September 1981 (age 45)
- Place of birth: Zadar, SR Croatia, Yugoslavia
- Height: 1.87 m (6 ft 2 in)
- Position: Right wing back

Youth career
- NK Zadar

Senior career*
Years	Team	Apps	(Gls)
1997–1999	Mosor	4	(0)
1999–2001	Rijeka	13	(0)
2002	Greuther Fürth	0	(0)
2002	Greuther Fürth II	5	(0)
2003–2004	Osijek	43	(0)
2004–2008	Dinamo Zagreb	86	(4)
2008–2014	Hajduk Split	37	(0)
2012	→ Primorac Stobreč (loan)		
2014	NK Arbanasi Zadar		

International career^{‡}
2006	Croatia	2	(0)
- * Club domestic league appearances and goals as of 21 May 2011 ‡ National team caps and goals as of 5 January 2008

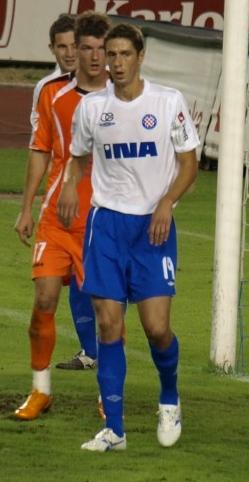
Marijan Buljat

Marijan Buljat (born 12 September 1981) is a Croatian retired football player who last played as a wingback for Arbanasi Zadar.

== Club career ==
Born in Zadar and a product of the NK Zadar academy, Buljat moved soon after finishing his youth career to NK Rijeka. After a year and a half there he moved in January 2002 to the 2. Bundesliga side Greuther Fürth, signing a 2.5-year contract. After featuring in only a few friendlies for the first side and playing mostly for the Greuther Fürth amateur team in the Oberliga Bayern, he moved in January 2003 back to Croatia, to NK Osijek. After another one and half there, he was signed, in summer 2004, by Dinamo Zagreb. In January 2007 Buljat's left leg was broken by the Croatia national team striker Eduardo in training. In a cruel twist of irony Eduardo's own leg was broken by a tackle by Birmingham City's Martin Taylor in 2008. In July 2008 he was reported that he was transferred to biggest Dinamo rival Hajduk Split on a free transfer, signing a four-year contract. After securing a first eleven spot in the 2008/2009 season, he was removed from the first team squad in late 2009 for refusing to sign a new contract with a wage cut. A new contract was signed six months later, and was set to feature in the first team again, but broke his right leg in training in July 2010, after featuring only in a single league match. He returned to play in 2011, after a 10-month recovery.

== International career ==
He made his debut for Croatia in a March 2006 friendly match against Argentina, coming on as a late substitute for Niko Kranjčar, and earned a total of 2 caps, scoring no goals. His second and final international was a June 2006 friendly against Poland.
