= Josip Bilaver =

Croatian football player

Personal information
- Date of birth: 14 August 1984 (age 42)
- Place of birth: Zadar, SFR Yugoslavia
- Height: 1.79 m (5 ft 10 1/2 in)
- Positions: Right back; right wing

Youth career
- Zadar

Senior career*
Years	Team	Apps	(Gls)
2003–2018	Zadar	178	(4)

International career
2004	Croatia U21	2	(0)
- * Club domestic league appearances and goals

Josip Bilaver (born 14 August 1984) is a Croatian retired footballer who spent his entire career at hometown club Zadar.

In 2020, he was appointed coach of NK Zadarnova.
