= Goran Rubil =

Croatian footballer (born 1981)

Personal information
- Date of birth: 9 March 1981 (age 45)
- Place of birth: Slavonski Brod, SFR Yugoslavia
- Height: 1.73 m (5 ft 8 in)
- Positions: Midfielder; right-back

Youth career
- Marsonia
- 1998–2000: Nantes

Senior career*
Years	Team	Apps	(Gls)
1999–2005	Nantes	11	(0)
2003–2004	→ Laval (loan)	8	(1)
2005	Shonan Bellmare	11	(0)
2005–2007	Rijeka	14	(1)
2007–2010	Hajduk Split	61	(4)
2010–2012	Asteras Tripolis	11	(0)
Total		116	(6)

International career
1997	Croatia U-15	1	(0)
1998	Croatia U-17	7	(2)
2000	Croatia U-18	2	(0)
1999–2000	Croatia U-19	7	(0)
2002–2003	Croatia U-21	10	(2)
- * Club domestic league appearances and goals

Goran Rubil (born 9 March 1981) is a Croatian former professional footballer who played as a midfielder.

== Career ==
Rubil started his career in his hometown club Marsonia Slavonski Brod. At the age of 17 he moved to France to play for FC Nantes, where he remained until the end of the 2004–05 season. During his time at Nantes he played only ten league matches for the club, but was a regular in the Croatian U19 and U21 sides. He spent the 2003–04 season on loan with Stade Lavallois where he had eight appearances and scored one goal. He acquired French nationality by naturalization on 1 August 2005.

In mid-2005 he signed for the J2 League team Shonan Bellmare. In early 2006 he moved back to Croatia to join HNK Rijeka, where he stayed until the mutual termination of his contract in December of the same year. Several clubs, both in Croatia and abroad showed interest. He went to England on trial for Leeds United, and looked set to sign for them, but apparently got tired of waiting, and returned to Croatia to sign a 3.5-year contract for Hajduk Split.

== Career statistics ==
Appearances and goals by club, season and competition
Club	Season	League		
Club	Season	Division	Apps	Goals
Nantes	1999–00	Division 1	2	0
Nantes	2000–01	Division 1	1	0
Nantes	2001–02	Division 1	2	0
Nantes	2002–03	Division 1	5	0
Nantes	2004–05	Division 1	1	0
Nantes	Total		11	0
Laval (loan)	2003–04	Ligue 2	8	1
Shonan Bellmare	2005	J2 League	11	0
Rijeka	2005–06	Croatian First Football League	4	0
Rijeka	2006–07	Croatian First Football League	10	1
Rijeka	Total		14	1
Hajduk Split	2006–07	Croatian First Football League	9	0
Hajduk Split	2007–08	Croatian First Football League	27	3
Hajduk Split	2008–09	Croatian First Football League	15	1
Hajduk Split	2009–10	Croatian First Football League	10	0
Hajduk Split	Total		61	4
Asteras Tripolis	2010–11	Super League Greece	11	0
Asteras Tripolis	2011–12	Super League Greece	0	0
Asteras Tripolis	Total		11	0
Total			116	6
