= Ilija Sivonjić =

Croatian footballer

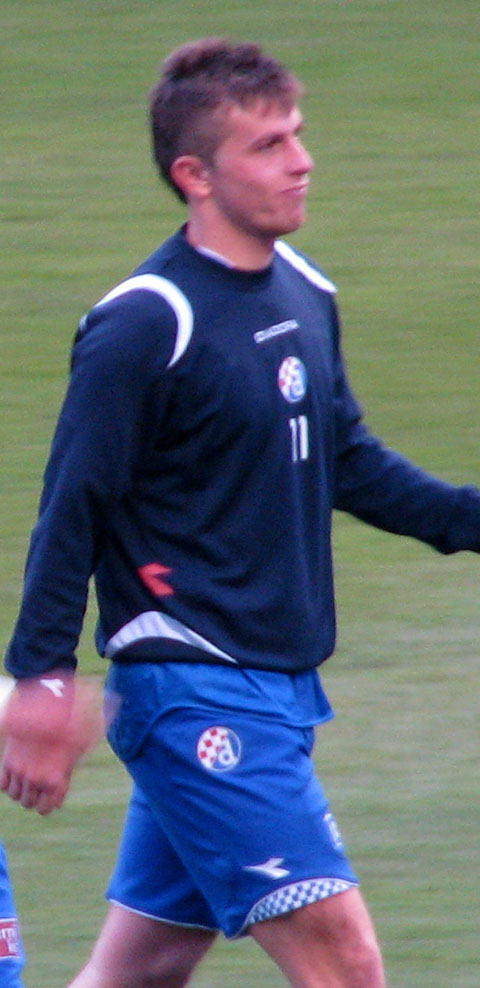
- Sivonjić with Dinamo Zagreb

Personal information
- Date of birth: 13 January 1987 (age 39)
- Place of birth: Zubovići, SR Bosnia and Herzegovina, Yugoslavia
- Height: 1.81 m (5 ft 11 in)
- Positions: Striker; winger

Youth career
- Dinamo Dežanovac
- 2003–2005: Kamen Ingrad

Senior career*
Years	Team	Apps	(Gls)
2005–2007	Kamen Ingrad	49	(9)
2007–2008	Inter Zaprešić	38	(12)
2008–2010	Dinamo Zagreb	30	(9)
2010	→ Inter Zaprešić (loan)	13	(3)
2010–2011	Lokomotiva	6	(0)
2011–2012	Rijeka	5	(0)
2013–2014	Hrvatski Dragovoljac	35	(6)
2014–2015	SC Oberweikertshofen	20	(8)
2015–2016	VSST Günzlhofen-Oberschweinbach	26	(13)
2016–2018	SC Fürstenfeldbruck	37	(26)
2018–2019	KAV Dendermonde		(6)

International career^{‡}
2006	Croatia U19	3	(1)
2006	Croatia U20	1	(0)
- * Club domestic league appearances and goals as of 6 May 2020 ‡ National team caps and goals as of 26 September 2006

Ilija Sivonjić (Croatian pronunciation: [ˈiliːa ˈsiːʋɔɲitɕ]; born 13 January 1987) is a Croatian professional footballer who plays as a striker and winger.

== Club career ==
Sivonjić started his senior career in top flight, debuting for Kamen Ingrad on 21 May 2005. He spent three seasons playing as midfielder and scored 9 goals in 49 appearances. Following Kamen's relegation at the end of the 2006–07 season, he was bought by Inter Zaprešić and made his first appearance for the club on 14 September 2007 against Međimurje, netting a brace in his debut. He ended the 2007–08 season with 4 goals in 21 appearances. In the 2008–09 season Sivonjić was Inter's top goalscorer before he was transferred to Croatian champions Dinamo Zagreb on 18 December 2008. In his debut season for Dinamo Sivonjič made 14 league and 3 more in the Croatian Cup, scoring 4 goals. Sivonjić started 2009–10 season with a goal at Dinamo's opening league match against Istra 1961 and also came in as a late substitute in Champions League match against Pyunik. Between 2014 and 2018 Sivonjić played for a string of lower-tier German clubs followed by a season at the Belgian 6th tier team KAV Dendermonde.

== International career ==
Sivonjić was capped four times in Croatia's under–19 team, all in 2006 in their under–19 European Championship qualifying campaign. He is also eligible to play for the Bosnia and Herzegovina national team.

== Career statistics ==
As of 9 September 2009

Club performance			League		Cup		League Cup		Continental		Total	
Season	Club	League	Apps	Goals	Apps	Goals	Apps	Goals	Apps	Goals	Apps	Goals
Croatia			League		Croatian Cup		League Cup		Europe		Total	
2004–05	Kamen Ingrad	Prva HNL	1	0							1	0
2005–06	Kamen Ingrad	Prva HNL	18	2							18	2
2006–07	Kamen Ingrad	Prva HNL	28	7							28	7
2007–08	Kamen Ingrad	Druga HNL	2	0							2	0
2007–08	Inter Zaprešić	Prva HNL	21	4							21	4
2008–09	Inter Zaprešić	Prva HNL	17	8							17	8
2008–09	Dinamo Zagreb	Prva HNL	14	3	3	1			0	0	17	4
2009–10	Dinamo Zagreb	Prva HNL	4	2	0	0			1	0	5	2
Career total			105	26	3	1	0	0	1	0	108	27

== Honours ==
Dinamo Zagreb

- Prva HNL: 2008–09
- Croatian Cup: 2008–09
- Croatian Supercup: 2010
