= Ante Aračić =

Croatian footballer

Personal information
- Date of birth: 28 September 1981 (age 45)
- Place of birth: Imotski, SR Croatia, SFR Yugoslavia
- Height: 1.88 m (6 ft 2 in)
- Position: Defender

Youth career
- 1986–1994: Imotski
- 1994–1999: Hajduk Split

Senior career*
Years	Team	Apps	(Gls)
1999–2000	NK Zagreb		
2000–2001	Segesta		
2001–2003	Imotski		
2003–2004	Oostende		
2004–2005	Posušje		
2005–2006	Zmaj Makarska		
2006–2007	Slavia Prague	17	(0)
2007–2008	Brussels	0	(0)
2008–2010	Hajduk Split	4	(1)
2010–2012	Šibenik	0	(0)
2012	Varaždin	4	(0)
2012–2014	Imotski	9	(0)
2014–2015	Croatia Zmijavci		
2016–2021	Mracaj Runovic		
- * Club domestic league appearances and goals as of 17 September 2012

Ante Aračić (born 28 September 1981, in Imotski) is a Croatian retired football defender.

== Club career ==
He started his career with the local side Imotski before moving to Segesta and later Zmaj Makarska. He moved to Slavia Prague for the 2005–06 season and played with the club until August 2007, when he was sent off during UEFA Champions League qualifying match against Žilina. Since then, he played only for the Slavia reserve squad and he was subsequently sold to Brussels. He was released in summer 2008 without participating in a single league match and was signed up by Hajduk Split three months later, after a trial. The opportunities were scarce at Hajduk as well, but he managed to score in a match against Slaven Belupo. This turned out to be his last league match for Hajduk, as he was injured in a pre-season friendly against Blackburn Rovers, missing the larger part of the 2009–10 season and unable to get into the first team afterwards. He was released on a free transfer to Šibenik in August 2010.
