= Ivan Rodić =

Croatian footballer (born 1985)

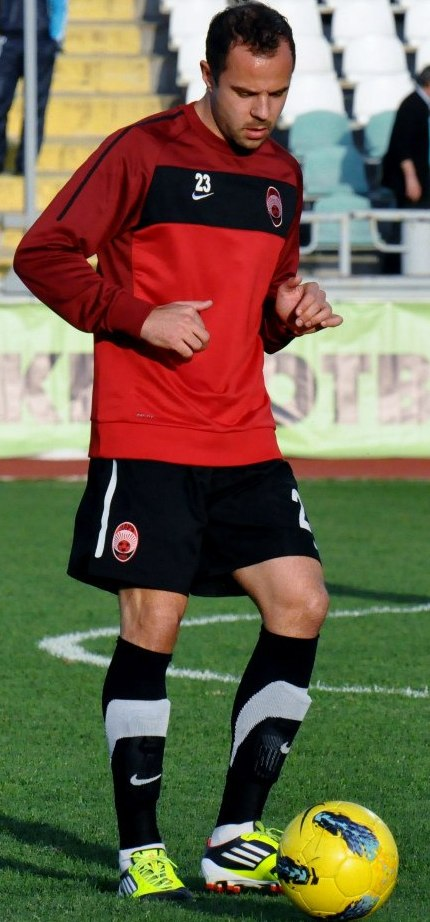
- Rodić with Zorya Luhsnsk

Personal information
- Date of birth: 11 November 1985 (age 40)
- Place of birth: Split, SR Croatia, SFR Yugoslavia
- Height: 1.79 m (5 ft 10 1/2 in)
- Position: Forward

Youth career
- Orkan Dugi Rat
- 2002–2004: Primorac 1929

Senior career*
Years	Team	Apps	(Gls)
2004	Primorac Stobreč		
2005–2007	Mosor	61	(21)
2007–2008	Imotski	29	(18)
2008–2009	Šibenik	27	(9)
2009–2010	Hajduk Split	5	(0)
2010	Rijeka	13	(3)
2011	Istra 1961	5	(0)
2011–2013	Zorya Luhansk	19	(1)
2014–2015	Hoverla Uzhhorod	4	(0)
2015–2016	Metalist Kharkiv	11	(2)
2017	Atyrau	5	(0)
2018	Arsenal Kyiv	7	(1)
2019–2021	Dugopolje	40	(7)
2021	Split	16	(2)
2021– 2024	Dugopolje	81	(17)
2024–2026	Uskok	54	(8)
- * Club domestic league appearances and goals as of 14 July 2026

Ivan Rodić (born 11 November 1985), is a retired Croatian football striker. In 2023 he played his 100th game in the second tier of Croatian club football, along with two in the Croatian Cup.
