= Mario Brkljača =

Croatian footballer

Personal information
- Date of birth: 7 February 1985 (age 41)
- Place of birth: Zagreb, SR Croatia, SFR Yugoslavia
- Height: 1.83 m (6 ft 0 in)
- Position: Midfielder

Youth career
- –2004: Zagreb

Senior career*
Years	Team	Apps	(Gls)
2004–2008	Zagreb	128	(12)
2009–2011	Hajduk Split	35	(3)
2009–2010	→ Cagliari (loan)	0	(0)
2012–2013	Sibir Novosibirsk	36	(0)
2014	SV Mattersburg	12	(1)
2015	CSKA Sofia	7	(0)
2015–2016	Krka	11	(0)

International career
2004–2008	Croatia U21	14	(3)

Managerial career
- 2018–: Hajduk Split (scout)
- * Club domestic league appearances and goals as of 31 May 2015

Mario Brkljača (born 7 February 1985) is a retired Croatian footballer who played as a midfielder.

== Club career ==
Born in Zagreb, Brkljača began his senior career with hometown side Zagreb.

During the winter transfer window of 2008–09, Brkljača joined Hajduk Split. After a successful short spell at Hajduk, he signed for Italian club side Cagliari Calcio on 8 August 2009 on loan. After an unsuccessful loan spell at the Italian club, he returned to Hajduk.

On 16 January 2015, Brkljača signed a one-and-a-half-year contract with CSKA Sofia in Bulgaria. He left the team after the conclusion of the second half of the 2014/2015 season.
