= Marin Ljubičić (footballer, born 1988) =

Croatian footballer

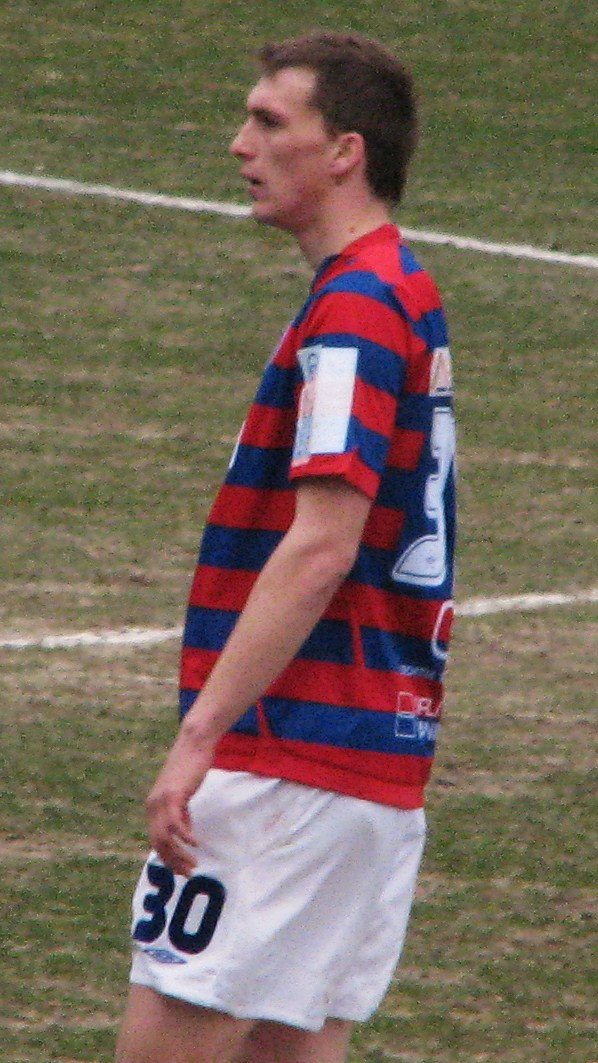

Personal information
- Full name: Marin Ljubičić
- Date of birth: 15 June 1988 (age 38)
- Place of birth: Metković, SR Croatia, SFR Yugoslavia
- Height: 1.86 m (6 ft 1 in)
- Positions: Defensive midfielder; centre-back

Youth career
- ONK Metković
- 1999-2001: Neretva
- 2001-2006: Hajduk Split

Senior career*
Years	Team	Apps	(Gls)
2005–2008	Hajduk Split	31	(2)
2008–2009	Zadar	39	(4)
2010–2011	Hajduk Split	29	(2)
2011–2014	Tavriya Simferopol	71	(4)
2014	Puskás Akadémia FC	0	(0)
2015–2018	DAC Dunajská Streda	100	(8)
2018–2020	Slovan Bratislava	37	(8)
2021	Senica	7	(1)
2021–2022	Sereď	22	(1)
2022–2024	Dugopolje	23	(0)

International career
2004	Croatia U17	3	(0)
2006	Croatia U18	2	(0)
2007	Croatia U19	3	(1)
2008–2009	Croatia U20	5	(2)
2007–2009	Croatia U21	10	(0)
- * Club domestic league appearances and goals

Marin Ljubičić (born 15 June 1988) is a Croatian professional footballer who last played as a defensive midfielder for ONK Metković.

== Club career ==
Ljubičić started playing football at his local club ONK Metković, shortly moving on to NK Neretva, before joining the HNK Hajduk Split academy. Becoming professional for the club, he played in top-tier 31 match before moving on to NK Zadar in the summer of 2008. After a season and a half, Ljubičić rejoined Hajduk, featuring in further 29 league matches for the club before being transferred to the Ukrainian side SC Tavriya Simferopol in the summer of 2011, for the sum of 400 thousand Euros.

After three years in Tavriya, in the summer of 2014, Ljubičić joined the Hungarian side Puskás Akadémia FC. After 4 months at the club, without a single game for the first team, Ljubičić moved on to Slovakia, signing for DAC Dunajská Streda.

After three years at the club, having played in 100 games for DAC, Ljubičić joined their rivals Slovan Bratislava in August 2018.

After further stints in Senica and Sereď, Ljubičić returned to Croatia, signing for second-tier NK Dugopolje in the summer of 2022.

== Honours ==
Slovan Bratislava

- Fortuna Liga: 2018–19, 2019–20
- Slovnaft Cup: 2019–20
