= 2008–09 HNK Hajduk Split season =

Hajduk Split
2008–09 season
- Chairman: Mate Peroš
- Manager: Goran Vučević (until 26 October 2008); Ante Miše
- Prva HNL: 2nd
- Croatian Cup: Runners-up
- UEFA Cup: Second qualifying round
- Top goalscorer: League: Nikola Kalinić (15); All: Nikola Kalinić (18)
- Highest home attendance: 38,000 vs Dinamo Zagreb (22 February 2009)
- Lowest home attendance: 1,500 vs Šibenik (14 September 2008)
- Average home league attendance: 9,471
Home colours	Away colours

The 2008–09 season was the 98th season in Hajduk Split's history and their eighteenth in the Prva HNL. Their 5th-place finish in the 2007–08 season meant it was their 18th successive season playing in the Prva HNL.

== First-team squad ==
Squad at end of season

Note: Flags indicate national team as defined under FIFA eligibility rules; some limited exceptions apply. Players may hold more than one non-FIFA nationality.

No.	Pos.	Nation	Player
1	GK	CRO	Danijel Subašić
2	DF	CRO	Matej Jonjić
3	FW	CRO	Tomislav Bušić
4	DF	CRO	Anthony Šerić
5	DF	CRO	Jurica Buljat
6	DF	CRO	Boris Živković
7	DF	CRO	Hrvoje Vejić
8	MF	CRO	Siniša Linić
9	FW	CRO	Nikola Kalinić
10	MF	BIH	Senijad Ibričić
11	MF	CRO	Srđan Andrić (captain)
12	GK	CRO	Vjekoslav Tomić
13	FW	CRO	Ante Vukušić
14	MF	CRO	Marin Tomasov
15	MF	CRO	Drago Gabrić
16	FW	BIH	Mladen Bartolović

No.	Pos.	Nation	Player
17	DF	CRO	Ivan Strinić
18	FW	CRO	Mirko Oremuš
19	MF	CRO	Marijan Buljat
20	MF	AUS	Josip Skoko
21	MF	CRO	Đovani Roso
22	DF	CRO	Mario Maloča
23	DF	CRO	Ante Aračić
24	MF	CRO	Mario Tičinović
25	GK	CRO	Božidar Radošević
26	MF	CRO	Goran Rubil
27	MF	CRO	Mario Brkljača
28	DF	BIH	Boris Pandža
29	MF	CRO	Dario Jertec
30	FW	CRO	Tedi Surać
31	DF	CRO	Mladen Pelaić

== Competitions ==
=== Overall record ===
Performance by competition
Competition	Starting round	Final position/round	First match	Last match
Prva HNL	—N/a	Runners-up	27 July 2008	31 May 2009
Croatian Football Cup	First round	Runners-up	23 September 2008	28 May 2009
UEFA Cup	First qualifying round	Second qualifying round	17 July 2008	28 August 2008

Statistics by competition
Competition	Pld	W	D	L	GF	GA	GD	Win%
Prva HNL	33	21	5	7	59	25	+34	63.64
Croatian Football Cup	8	4	3	1	13	5	+8	50.00
UEFA Cup	4	2	1	1	7	2	+5	50.00
Total	45	27	9	9	79	32	+47	60.00

=== Prva HNL ===
==== Classification ====
Pos	Team	Pld	W	D	L	GF	GA	GD	Pts	Qualification or relegation
1	Dinamo Zagreb (C)	33	23	5	5	71	26	+45	74	Qualification to Champions League second qualifying round
2	Hajduk Split	33	21	5	7	59	25	+34	68	Qualification to Europa League third qualifying round
3	Rijeka	33	17	5	11	50	44	+6	56	Qualification to Europa League second qualifying round
4	Slaven Belupo	33	16	7	10	46	39	+7	55	Qualification to Europa League first qualifying round (Note: Because both cup finalists, Dinamo and Hajduk, qualified for Europe through their league positions, all three UEFA Europa League spots were given to teams according to their league positions, what means that fourth-placed Slaven Belupo also earned a spot in Europa League.)
5	NK Zagreb	33	13	8	12	38	39	−1	47	

Source: Sportnet.hr
Rules for classification: 1) points; 2) goal difference; 3) number of goals scored.
(C) Champions

==== Results summary ====
Overall								Home						Away					
Pld	W	D	L	GF	GA	GD	Pts	W	D	L	GF	GA	GD	W	D	L	GF	GA	GD
33	21	5	7	59	25	+34	68	13	3	1	36	9	+27	8	2	6	23	16	+7

Last updated: 31 May 2009.
Source: Sportnet.hr

==== Results by round ====
Round	1	2	3	4	5	6	7	8	9	10	11	12	13	14	15	16	17	18	19	20	21	22	23	24	25	26	27	28	29	30	31	32	33
Ground	H	H	A	A	H	A	H	A	H	A	H	A	A	H	H	A	H	A	H	A	H	A	H	A	H	A	H	A	H	A	H	A	H
Result	W	D	L	L	W	W	W	W	D	L	W	L	W	W	W	W	W	W	W	W	W	D	W	L	W	W	W	W	L	L	W	D	D
Position	4	5	8	10	7	5	3	2	2	2	3	3	3	2	2	2	2	2	1	1	1	1	1	2	2	2	2	2	2	2	2	2	2

Source: Competitive matches
A = Away; H = Home; W = Win; D = Draw; L = Loss

==== Results by opponent ====
Team	Results			Points
Team	1	2	3	Points
Cibalia	2–0	1–1	2–0	7
Croatia Sesvete	0–1	1–0	5–0	6
Dinamo Zagreb	2–0	2–0	2–2	7
Inter Zaprešić	3–3	4–0	2–0	7
Osijek	2–1	3–1	0–1	6
Rijeka	1–3	2–0	1–2	3
Slaven Belupo	3–1	2–1	1–1	7
Šibenik	1–0	2–1	2–0	9
Varteks	1–1	2–0	0–1	4
Zadar	1–0	0–1	3–0	6
NK Zagreb	0–3	4–0	2–0	6

Source: 2008–09 Croatian First Football League article

== Matches ==
=== Prva HNL ===
27 July 2008 1	Hajduk Split	1–0	Zadar	Split
20:00 CEST (UTC+02:00)	Pandža (yellow card) 26'; Ibričić 86'	Report	Parmaković (yellow card) 69'; Župan (yellow card) 79'	Stadium: Stadion Poljud; Attendance: 10,000; Referee: Ivo Krečak (Šibenik)

3 August 2008 2	Hajduk Split	1–1	Varteks	Split
20:10 CEST (UTC+02:00)	Kalinić 56'; Skoko (yellow card) 76'	Report	Smrekar 1'	Stadium: Stadion Poljud; Attendance: 10,000; Referee: Damir Batinić (Osijek)

10 August 2008 3	NK Zagreb	3–0	Hajduk Split	Zagreb
20:10 CEST (UTC+02:00)	Vugrinec 17' (pen.); Brkljača (yellow card) 51'; Ivanković (yellow card) 57'; Piškor 62'; Parlov 68' (yellow card) 90'	Report	Strinić (yellow card) 16'; Ibričić (yellow card) 27'; Skoko (yellow card) 56'	Stadium: Stadion Maksimir; Attendance: 2,000; Referee: Ivan Bebek (Rijeka)

17 August 2008 4	Rijeka	3–1	Hajduk Split	Rijeka
20:10 CEST (UTC+02:00)	Pamić (yellow card) 25'; An. Sharbini 66' (yellow card) 50' (yellow-red card) 67'; Čagalj 66'; Križman (yellow card) 68' (goal) 90+3'	Report	Andrić (yellow card) 28'; Kalinić 45+1'; Linić (yellow card) 47'; Gabrić (yellow card) 78'; J. Buljat (red card) 90+2'; Živković (yellow card) 90+3'	Stadium: Stadion Kantrida; Attendance: 4,000; Referee: Vlado Svilokos (Sisak)

23 August 2008 5	Hajduk Split	3–1	Slaven Belupo	Split
20:00 CEST (UTC+02:00)	Andrić (yellow card) 8'; Kalinić 40', 71' (pen.), 77' (pen.); M. Buljat (yellow card) 51'; Maloča (yellow card) 74'; Živković (yellow card) 87'	Report	Jurić 6'; Bošnjak (yellow card) 10'; Čaval (yellow card) 25'; Posavec (yellow card) 31'; Rogulj (yellow card) 70'	Stadium: Stadion Poljud; Attendance: 4,000; Referee: Ivan Bebek (Rijeka)

31 August 2008 6	Osijek	1–2	Hajduk Split	Osijek
20:00 CEST (UTC+02:00)	Vida (yellow card) 30'; Hrnčević (yellow card) 47'; Primorac 63'; Prijić (yellow card) 89'; V. Babić (yellow card) 90'	Report	Linić (yellow card) 38' (yellow-red card) 66'; Kalinić 39' (yellow card) 90'; Pandža (yellow card) 44'; Gabrić 52' (yellow card) 90'; J. Buljat (yellow card) 90'; Bartolović (yellow card) 90'	Stadium: Stadion Gradski vrt Attendance: 7,000; Referee: Zlatko Šimčić (Koprivnica)

14 September 2008 7	Hajduk Split	1–0	Šibenik	Split
18:00 CEST (UTC+02:00)	Gabrić 24'; Živković (yellow card) 51'	Report	Kulušić (yellow card) 39'; Celišćak (yellow card) 43'; Ademi (yellow card) 49'	Stadium: Stadion Poljud; Attendance: 1,500; Referee: Andrej Burilo (Osijek)

21 September 2008 8	Dinamo Zagreb	0–2	Hajduk Split	Zagreb
20:15 CEST (UTC+02:00)	Bišćan (yellow card) 33'; Mandžukić (yellow card) 70'	Report	Rubil (yellow card) 48'; Gabrić 51'; Ibričić (yellow card) 65' (goal) 76'	Stadium: Stadion Maksimir; Attendance: 8,000; Referee: Vlado Svilokos (Sisak)

28 September 2008 9	Hajduk Split	3–3	Inter Zaprešić	Split
16:30 CEST (UTC+02:00)	Kalinić 37' (pen.), 43' (pen.); Pandža (yellow card) 51'; Andrić (yellow card) 54' (goal) 79'; Tičinović (yellow card) 60'	Report	Gulić 16', 42'; Batarelo 35' (yellow card) 75'; Budimir (yellow card) 37'; Iftić (yellow card) 43'; Brašnić (yellow card) 82'	Stadium: Stadion Poljud; Attendance: 9,000; Referee: Bruno Marić (Daruvar)

5 October 2008 10	Croatia Sesvete	1–0	Hajduk Split	Zagreb
16:30 CEST (UTC+02:00)	Palić 8'; Šušak (yellow card) 19'; Radoš (yellow card) 88'; Mamić (yellow card) 90+2'	Report	Strinić (yellow card) 35'; Oremuš (yellow card) 42'; Maloča (yellow card) 69'	Stadium: Stadion Kranjčevićeva; Attendance: 4,000; Referee: Igor Križarić (Čakovec)

19 October 2008 11	Hajduk Split	2–0	Cibalia	Split
15:30 CEST (UTC+02:00)	Kalinić 13' (pen.), 67' (pen.) (yellow card) 43'; Strinić (yellow card) 60'; Skoko (yellow card) 90+1'	Report	Mešić (yellow card) 19'; Mazalović (yellow card) 45'; Radaš (yellow card) 48'	Stadium: Stadion Poljud; Attendance: 4,000; Referee: Danijel Trampus (Osijek)

26 October 2008 12	Zadar	1–0	Hajduk Split	Zadar
15:30 CET (UTC+01:00)	Parmaković (yellow card) 43'; Milin (yellow card) 56'; Ljubičić 59'; Bilaver (yellow card) 82'	Report	Pandža (yellow card) 29'; Maloča (yellow card) 67'; Gabrić (yellow card) 81'; Oremuš (yellow card) 90+3'	Stadium: Stadion Stanovi; Attendance: 3,500; Referee: Ivo Krečak (Šibenik)

2 November 2008 13	Varteks	0–2	Hajduk Split	Varaždin
20:30 CET (UTC+01:00)	Prahić (yellow card) 14'; Mumlek (yellow card) 86'; Smrekar (yellow card) 90+3'	Report	Ibričić (yellow card) 9' (goal) 47'; Bušić 36'; Andrić (yellow card) 45'; Oremuš (yellow card) 78'; Pandža (yellow card) 90'; J. Buljat (yellow card) 90+1'	Stadium: Stadion Varteks; Attendance: 4,000; Referee: Ivan Bebek (Rijeka)

9 November 2008 14	Hajduk Split	4–0	NK Zagreb	Split
20:15 CET (UTC+01:00)	Linić 27'; Oremuš 29'; Rubil 30'; J. Buljat (yellow card) 70'; Bartolović 75'	Report	Pavlović (yellow card) 76'	Stadium: Stadion Poljud; Attendance: 5,000; Referee: Domagoj Ljubičić (Osijek)

16 November 2008 15	Hajduk Split	2–0	Rijeka	Split
20:15 CET (UTC+01:00)	Pandža (yellow card) 3'; Bodrušić 8' (o.g.); Ibričić 24'; Strinić (yellow card) 61' (yellow-red card) 83'	Report	Dabac (yellow card) 51'	Stadium: Stadion Poljud; Attendance: 7,000; Referee: Igor Pristovnik (Zagreb)

23 November 2008 16	Slaven Belupo	1–2	Hajduk Split	Koprivnica
20:15 CET (UTC+01:00)	Čaval 50'; Jurić (yellow card) 59'	Report	Maloča (yellow card) 38'; Oremuš 58', 73'; J. Buljat (yellow card) 75'	Stadium: Gradski stadion Attendance: 3,000; Referee: Domagoj Vučkov (Rijeka)

30 November 2008 17	Hajduk Split	3–1	Osijek	Split
15:30 CET (UTC+01:00)	Andrić 25', 49' (red card) 73'; Ibričić 57'	Report	V. Babić (yellow card) 24'; Pranjić (yellow card) 37'; Vida (yellow card) 44'; Barišić 60'	Stadium: Stadion Poljud; Attendance: 8,000; Referee: Ivan Bebek (Rijeka)

7 December 2008 18	Šibenik	1–2	Hajduk Split	Šibenik
20:15 CET (UTC+01:00)	Milanović (yellow card) 36' (goal) 70'; Gović (yellow card) 69'; Ademi (yellow card) 90+2'	Report	Kalinić 5'; Pandža (yellow card) 24'; Gabrić 52' (yellow card) 81'	Stadium: Stadion Šubićevac; Attendance: 6,000; Referee: Draženko Kovačić (Križevci)

22 February 2009 19	Hajduk Split	2–0	Dinamo Zagreb	Split
20:15 CET (UTC+01:00)	Andrić (yellow card) 3'; Pandža (yellow card) 24'; Vejić (yellow card) 34'; Kalinić 45+2' (pen.); Ibričić 51'; J. Buljat (yellow card) 82' (yellow-red card) 87'; Roso (yellow card) 90+5'	Report	Hrgović (yellow card) 16'; Lovren (yellow card) 40' (yellow-red card) 90+4'; Mandžukić (yellow card) 45+2'	Stadium: Stadion Poljud; Attendance: 38,000; Referee: Ivan Bebek (Rijeka)

1 March 2009 20	Inter Zaprešić	0–4	Hajduk Split	Zaprešić
15:30 CET (UTC+01:00)	Budimir (yellow card) 10'; Pecelj (yellow card) 41' (yellow-red card) 64'	Report	Gabrić 11'; Ibričić 55'; Andrić 65'; Vejić (yellow card) 76'; Bartolović 81'	Stadium: Stadion ŠRC Zaprešić; Attendance: 5,000; Referee: Igor Križarić (Čakovec)

8 March 2009 21	Hajduk Split	1–0	Croatia Sesvete	Split
15:30 CET (UTC+01:00)	Tomasov 52'; Šerić (yellow card) 71'	Report	Agić (yellow card) 53'; Landeka (yellow card) 70'	Stadium: Stadion Poljud; Attendance: 18,000; Referee: Andrej Burilo (Osijek)

15 March 2009 22	Cibalia	1–1	Hajduk Split	Vinkovci
20:15 CET (UTC+01:00)	Mazalović (yellow card) 39'; Baraban (yellow card) 55'; Pavličić 90' (yellow card) 90'	Report	Kalinić 52'; Šerić (yellow card) 90+1'; Skoko (yellow card) 90+3'	Stadium: Stadion HNK Cibalia; Attendance: 8,000; Referee: Zlatko Šimčić (Koprivnica)

22 March 2009 23	Hajduk Split	2–0	NK Zagreb	Split
20:15 CET (UTC+01:00)	Kalinić 45+2' (pen.); M. Buljat (yellow card) 48'; Andrić 54'; Gabrić (yellow card) 64'	Report	Špičić (yellow card) 31'; Mujdža (yellow card) 45+1'; Kartelo (yellow card) 70'; Pejić (yellow card) 85'	Stadium: Stadion Poljud; Attendance: 10,000; Referee: Damir Batinić (Osijek)

5 April 2009 24	Osijek	1–0	Hajduk Split	Osijek
16:30 CEST (UTC+02:00)	Vida (yellow card) 71'; Barišić 76'; Vidaković (yellow card) 85'; Ibriks (yellow card) 90'	Report	Skoko (yellow card) 69'; J. Buljat (yellow card) 82'	Stadium: Stadion Gradski vrt Attendance: 15,000; Referee: Igor Pristovnik (Zagreb)

11 April 2009 25	Hajduk Split	2–0	Cibalia	Split
16:30 CEST (UTC+02:00)	Šerić (yellow card) 28'; Gabrić 47'; Ibričić 62'	Report	Matić (yellow card) 11'; Medvid (yellow card) 66'; Grgić (yellow card) 78'; Radotić (yellow card) 90'	Stadium: Stadion Poljud; Attendance: 10,000; Referee: Ante Vučemilović-Šimunović (Osijek)

19 April 2009 26	Inter Zaprešić	0–2	Hajduk Split	Zaprešić
16:30 CEST (UTC+02:00)	Budimir (yellow card) 40' (yellow-red card) 65'; Krznar (yellow card) 65'; Ceraj (yellow card) 75'	Report	Gabrić 40', 66'; Andrić (yellow card) 45'; Kalinić (yellow card) 65' (penalty missed) 66'; Pandža (yellow card) 87'; Maloča (red card) 90'	Stadium: Stadion ŠRC Zaprešić; Attendance: 4,000; Referee: Domagoj Ljubičić (Osijek)

22 April 2009 27	Hajduk Split	5–0	Croatia Sesvete	Split
16:30 CEST (UTC+02:00)	Ibričić 11', 18'; Vejić 54' (yellow card) 69'; Skoko (yellow card) 59'; Tičinović 57'; Jertec 72' (yellow card) 89'	Report	Tabi (yellow card) 67'; Položani (yellow card) 78'	Stadium: Stadion Poljud; Attendance: 5,500; Referee: Danijel Trampus (Osijek)

26 April 2009 28	Zadar	0–3	Hajduk Split	Zadar
16:30 CEST (UTC+02:00)	Ljubičić (red card) 56'; Bilaver (yellow card) 65'; Pletikosić (yellow card) 85'	Report	Ibričić 6' (yellow card) 90'; Pandža (yellow card) 23'; Šerić (yellow card) 42'; Andrić (yellow card) 51' (goal) 63'; Tičinović 69'; Subašić (yellow card) 90'	Stadium: Stadion Stanovi; Attendance: 6,000; Referee: Bruno Marić (Daruvar)

3 May 2009 29	Hajduk Split	0–1	Varteks	Split
20:15 CEST (UTC+02:00)	Linić (yellow card) 32'; Skoko (yellow card) 76'	Report	Carlos (yellow card) 50'; Golubar (yellow card) 51'; Smrekar 57'; Dreven (yellow card) 62'; Lesjak (yellow card) 76'	Stadium: Stadion Poljud; Attendance: 8,000; Referee: Dalibor Mlakar (Zagreb)

10 May 2009 30	Rijeka	2–1	Hajduk Split	Rijeka
20:15 CEST (UTC+02:00)	An. Sharbini (yellow card) 18' (goal) 90+2'; Pamić (yellow card) 21' (goal) 85'; Ah. Sharbini (yellow card) 90+2'	Report	M. Buljat (yellow card) 24'; Kalinić (yellow card) 34'; Pandža (yellow card) 59'; Ibričić (yellow card) 60'; Vejić (yellow card) 65' (goal) 75'; Gabrić (yellow card) 81'; Andrić (yellow card) 83'	Stadium: Stadion Kantrida; Attendance: 7,000; Referee: Igor Pristovnik (Zagreb)

17 May 2009 31	Hajduk Split	2–0	Šibenik	Split
16:30 CEST (UTC+02:00)	Maloča (yellow card) 13'; Pandža 25' (yellow card) 73'; Kalinić 44'	Report	Zec (yellow card) 30'; Husmani (yellow card) 31'; Ademi (yellow card) 34'; Spahija (yellow card) 63'; Bonacin (yellow card) 90'	Stadium: Stadion Poljud; Attendance: 3,500; Referee: Damir Batinić (Osijek)

24 May 2009 32	Slaven Belupo	1–1	Hajduk Split	Koprivnica
16:30 CEST (UTC+02:00)	Vručina (yellow card) 58'; Poldrugač (yellow card) 86'; Maras 87'; Kokalović (yellow card) 90'	Report	Roso (yellow card) 80'; Aračić 90+3'	Stadium: Gradski stadion Attendance: 3,500; Referee: Damir Batinić (Osijek)

31 May 2009 33	Hajduk Split	2–2	Dinamo Zagreb	Split
20:15 CEST (UTC+02:00)	Vejić (yellow card) 32'; Ibričić 67'; Vukušić 81'	Report	Chago 8' (yellow card) 30'; Mandžukić 14'; Hrgović (yellow card) 45'; Tomečak (yellow card) 57'; Barbarić (yellow card) 72'	Stadium: Stadion Poljud; Attendance: 10,000; Referee: Andrej Burilo (Osijek)

Source: HRnogomet.com

=== Croatian Football Cup ===
23 September 2008 R1	Orijent	1–4	Hajduk Split	Rijeka
15:30 CEST (UTC+02:00)	Weitzer 34' (pen.); Orlović (yellow card) 41'; Topolnjak (yellow card) 53'	Report	Jertec 5', 15'; Maloča 50'; Gabrić (yellow card) 83'; M. Buljat 86'	Stadium: Stadion Krimeja; Attendance: 2,000; Referee: Domagoj Ljubičić (Osijek)

29 October 2008 R2	Konavljanin	0–2	Hajduk Split	Gruda, Konavle
14:00 CET (UTC+01:00)	Žižić (yellow card) 23'; Čeliković (yellow card) 47'; Karamatić (yellow card) 50'; Špalj (yellow card) 77'	Report	Andrić 24'; Pandža (yellow card) 33'; Ibričić 49'; Strinić (yellow card) 51'; Tičinović (yellow card) 80'	Stadium: Igralište Gnjile; Attendance: 4,000; Referee: Ivan Bebek (Rijeka)

12 November 2008 QF	Hajduk Split	0–0	Slaven Belupo	Split
17:00 CET (UTC+01:00)	Bušić (yellow card) 52'; Ibričić (yellow card) 89'	Report	Lapić (yellow card) 34'; Nynkeu (red card) 39'; Pelin (yellow card) 90+1'	Stadium: Stadion Poljud; Attendance: 5,000; Referee: Vlado Svilokos (Sisak)

26 November 2008 QF	Slaven Belupo	0–0 (0–0 agg.) (6–7 p)	Hajduk Split	Koprivnica
17:00 CET (UTC+01:00)	Maras (yellow card) 18'; Bošnjak (yellow card) 44'	Report; Penalties	Strinić (yellow card) 13'; Gabrić (yellow card) 66'	Stadium: Gradski stadion Attendance: 3,000; Referee: Bruno Marić (Daruvar)
	Penalties
	Vručina (penalty scored); Šafarić (penalty scored); Maras (penalty scored); Jajalo (penalty scored); Bilen (penalty scored); Kokalović (penalty scored); Purić (penalty missed)		(penalty scored) Kalinić; (penalty scored) Andrić; (penalty scored) Bušić; (penalty scored) J. Buljat; (penalty scored) Skoko; (penalty scored) Gabrić; (penalty scored) Rubil

4 March 2009 SF	Hajduk Split	4–1	Cibalia	Split
15:30 CET (UTC+01:00)	Tomasov 12'; Gabrić 34' (yellow card) 65'; Oremuš 37' (yellow card) 59'; Pandža 85' (yellow card) 74'	Report	Milardović (yellow card) 20'; Malčić 29'; Mazalović (yellow card) 42'; I. Babić (yellow card) 72'; Husić (yellow card) 75'	Stadium: Stadion Poljud; Attendance: 5,000; Referee: Domagoj Vučkov (Rijeka)

18 March 2009 SF	Cibalia	0–0 (1–4 agg.)	Hajduk Split	Vinkovci
17:00 CET (UTC+01:00)	Šimunac (yellow card) 31'	Report	Linić (yellow card) 88'	Stadium: Stadion HNK Cibalia; Attendance: 2,500; Referee: Danijel Trampus (Osijek)

13 May 2009 Final	Dinamo Zagreb	3–0	Hajduk Split	Zagreb
20:15 CEST (UTC+02:00)	Mandžukić 13', 57' (yellow card) 35'; Sammir 29' (pen.); Bišćan (yellow card) 38'; Vrdoljak (yellow card) 47'; Lovren (yellow card) 74'; Hrgović (yellow card) 75'	Report	Ibričić (yellow card) 23'; Pandža (yellow card) 29'; J. Buljat (red card) 34'; Šerić (yellow card) 35'; Linić (red card) 45+1'	Stadium: Stadion Maksimir; Attendance: 20,000; Referee: Bruno Marić (Daruvar)

28 May 2009 Final	Hajduk Split	3–0 (3–3 agg.) (3–4 p)	Dinamo Zagreb	Split
20:00 CEST (UTC+02:00)	Maloča (yellow card) 41'; Kalinić 56', 75'; Bartolović 58'; Gabrić (yellow card) 78'	Report	Hrgović (yellow card) 30'; Badelj (yellow card) 37'	Stadium: Stadion Poljud; Attendance: 18,000; Referee: Domagoj Ljubičić (Osijek)
	Penalties
	Kalinić (penalty scored); Roso (penalty missed); Bartolović (penalty scored); Ibričić (penalty scored); Andrić (penalty missed)		(penalty scored) Bišćan; (penalty scored) Sammir; (penalty scored) Badelj; (penalty scored) Morales; (penalty missed) Hrgović

Source: HRnogomet.com

=== UEFA Cup ===
==== First qualifying round ====
17 July 2008 First leg	Hajduk Split (Croatia)	4–0	(Malta) Birkirkara	Split, Croatia
21:00 CEST (UTC+02:00)	Ibričić 3'; Rubil (yellow card) 24'; Kalinić 24'; Bušić 55'; Tičinović 71'	Report		Stadium: Stadion Poljud; Attendance: 20,000; Referee: Carlo Bertolini (Switzerland)

31 July 2008 Second leg	Birkirkara (Malta)	0–3 (0–7 agg.)	(Croatia) Hajduk Split	Ta' Qali, Malta
18:00 CEST (UTC+02:00)		Report	Strinić 5' (yellow card) 36'; Bartolović 45'; Ibričić 90+2'	Stadium: Ta' Qali National Stadium; Attendance: 1,800; Referee: David McKeon (Republic of Ireland)

==== Second qualifying round ====
14 August 2008 First leg	Deportivo La Coruña (Spain)	0–0	(Croatia) Hajduk Split	A Coruña, Spain
21:00 CEST (UTC+02:00)		Report	Oremuš (yellow card) 17'; Rubil (yellow card) 41'; Skoko (yellow card) 61'; Ibričić (yellow card) 68'; Gabrić (yellow card) 77'; Subašić (yellow card) 90'	Stadium: Estadio Riazor; Attendance: 13,000; Referee: Cüneyt Çakır (Turkey)

28 August 2008 Second leg	Hajduk Split (Croatia)	0–2 (0–2 agg.)	(Spain) Deportivo La Coruña	Split, Croatia
20:45 CEST (UTC+02:00)	Maloča (yellow card) 33'; J. Buljat (yellow card) 40'; Andrić (yellow card) 55' (yellow-red card) 65'	Report	Laure (yellow card) 12'; De Guzman (yellow card) 15' (yellow-red card) 90'; Riki 42'; Verdú 87' (pen.)	Stadium: Stadion Poljud; Attendance: 35,000; Referee: Gianluca Rocchi (Italy)

Source: uefa.com

== Player seasonal records ==
Competitive matches only. Updated to games played 31 May 2009.

=== Top scorers ===
Rank	Name	League	Europe	Cup	Total
1	(Croatia) Nikola Kalinić	15	2	1	18
2	(Bosnia and Herzegovina) Senijad Ibričić	12	1	2	15
3	(Croatia) Drago Gabrić	8	1	–	9
4	(Croatia) Srđan Andrić	6	1	–	7
5	(Croatia) Mirko Oremuš	3	1	–	4
6	(Bosnia and Herzegovina) Boris Pandža	2	1	–	3
6	(Croatia) Mario Tičinović	2	–	1	3
6	(Croatia) Dario Jertec	1	2	–	3
6	(Bosnia and Herzegovina) Mladen Bartolović	1	1	1	3
10	(Croatia) Hrvoje Vejić	2	–	–	2
10	(Croatia) Marin Tomasov	1	1	–	2
10	(Croatia) Tomislav Bušić	1	–	1	2
13	(Croatia) Ante Aračić	1	–	–	1
13	(Croatia) Siniša Linić	1	–	–	1
13	(Croatia) Goran Rubil	1	–	–	1
13	(Croatia) Ante Vukušić	1	–	–	1
13	(Croatia) Marijan Buljat	–	1	–	1
13	(Croatia) Mario Maloča	–	1	–	1
13	(Croatia) Ivan Strinić	–	–	1	1
	TOTALS	58	13	7	78

Source: Competitive matches

== See also ==
- 2008–09 Croatian First Football League
- 2008–09 Croatian Football Cup
