= 2009 Croatian Football Cup final =

- Event: 2008–09 Croatian Cup
Dinamo Zagreb	Hajduk Split
3	3
- Dinamo Zagreb won 4–3 on penalties

First leg
Dinamo Zagreb	Hajduk Split
3	0
- Date: 13 May 2009
- Venue: Stadion Maksimir, Zagreb
- Man of the Match: Mario Mandžukić (Dinamo Zagreb)
- Referee: Bruno Marić (Daruvar)
- Attendance: 20,000
- Weather: Clear

Second leg
Hajduk Split	Dinamo Zagreb
3	0
- Date: 28 May 2009
- Venue: Stadion Poljud, Split
- Man of the Match: Nikola Kalinić (Hajduk Split)
- Referee: Domagoj Ljubičić (Osijek)
- Attendance: 18,000
- Weather: Clear

The 2009 Croatian Cup final was a two-legged affair played between Hajduk Split and Dinamo Zagreb. The first leg was played in Zagreb on 13 May 2009, while the second leg on 28 May 2009 in Split.

Dinamo Zagreb won the trophy after the penalty shoot-out after was an affair finished on aggregate result of 3–3.

== Road to the final ==
Dinamo Zagreb		Round	Hajduk Split	
Opponent	Result		Opponent	Result
Gaj Mače	5–1	First round	Orijent	4–1
Hrvatski Dragovoljac	6–0	Second round	Konavljanin	2–0
Zagora Unešić	2–1	Quarter-finals	Slaven Belupo	0–0
Zagora Unešić	5–1	Quarter-finals	Slaven Belupo	0–0 (7–6 p)
NK Zagreb	2–0	Semi-finals	Cibalia	4–1
NK Zagreb	4–1	Semi-finals	Cibalia	0–0

== First leg ==
13 May 2009
20:15

Dinamo Zagreb	3–0	Hajduk Split
Mandžukić 13', 57'; Sammir 29' (pen.)	Report (in Croatian)

Stadion Maksimir, Zagreb
Attendance: 20,000
Referee: Bruno Marić (Daruvar)

Dinamo Zagreb	Hajduk Split

DINAMO ZAGREB:
GK	1	(Croatia) Tomislav Butina
DF	6	(Croatia) Dejan Lovren	(yellow card) 74'
DF	19	(Croatia) Tomislav Barbarić
DF	21	(Croatia) Ivica Vrdoljak	(yellow card) 47'
DF	22	(Croatia) Igor Bišćan (c)	(yellow card) 38'
MF	2	(Croatia) Ivan Tomečak
MF	10	(Brazil) Sammir		(substituted off) 90'
MF	16	(Croatia) Milan Badelj		(substituted off) 77'
MF	18	(Bosnia and Herzegovina) Mirko Hrgović	(yellow card) 75'
FW	17	(Croatia) Mario Mandžukić	(yellow card) 35'
FW	24	(Croatia) Ilija Sivonjić		(substituted off) 84'
Substitutes:
MF	13	(Cameroon) Mathias Chago		(substituted on) 77'
FW	11	(Croatia) Josip Tadić		(substituted on) 84'
DF	3	(Argentina) Luis Ibáñez		(substituted on) 90'
Manager:
(Croatia) Krunoslav Jurčić

HAJDUK SPLIT:
GK	1	(Croatia) Danijel Subašić
DF	4	(Croatia) Anthony Šerić	(yellow card) 35'
DF	7	(Croatia) Hrvoje Vejić
DF	19	(Croatia) Marijan Buljat
DF	28	(Bosnia and Herzegovina) Boris Pandža	(yellow card) 29'	(substituted off) 30'
MF	8	(Croatia) Siniša Linić	(red card) 45+1'
MF	10	(Bosnia and Herzegovina) Senijad Ibričić	(yellow card) 23'	(substituted off) 89'
MF	14	(Croatia) Marin Tomasov		(substituted off) 37'
MF	15	(Croatia) Drago Gabrić
MF	20	(Australia) Josip Skoko (c)
FW	9	(Croatia) Nikola Kalinić
Substitutes:
DF	5	(Croatia) Jurica Buljat	(red card) 34'	(substituted on) 30'
DF	22	(Croatia) Mario Maloča		(substituted on) 37'
FW	16	(Bosnia and Herzegovina) Mladen Bartolović		(substituted on) 89'
Manager:
(Croatia) Ante Miše

Assistant referees:
Željko Perak (Karlovac)
Damir Pervan (Bjelovar)

Match rules

- 90 minutes.
- Seven named substitutes.
- Maximum of three substitutions.

== Second leg ==
28 May 2009
20:00

Hajduk Split	3–0	Dinamo Zagreb
Kalinić 56', 75'; Bartolović 58'	Report (in Croatian)
Penalties
Kalinić (penalty scored); Roso (penalty missed); Bartolović (penalty scored); Ibričić (penalty scored); Andrić (penalty missed)	3–4	(penalty scored) Bišćan; (penalty scored) Sammir; (penalty scored) Badelj; (penalty scored) Morales; (penalty missed) Hrgović

Stadion Poljud, Split
Attendance: 18,000
Referee: Domagoj Ljubičić (Osijek)

Hajduk Split	Dinamo Zagreb

HAJDUK SPLIT:
GK	1	(Croatia) Danijel Subašić
DF	4	(Croatia) Anthony Šerić
DF	7	(Croatia) Hrvoje Vejić
DF	19	(Croatia) Marijan Buljat		(substituted off) 78'
DF	22	(Croatia) Mario Maloča	(yellow card) 41'
MF	10	(Bosnia and Herzegovina) Senijad Ibričić
MF	11	(Croatia) Srđan Andrić (c)
MF	15	(Croatia) Drago Gabrić	(yellow card) 78'
MF	20	(Australia) Josip Skoko		(substituted off) 86'
FW	9	(Croatia) Nikola Kalinić
FW	16	(Bosnia and Herzegovina) Mladen Bartolović
Substitutes:
DF	17	(Croatia) Ivan Strinić		(substituted on) 78'
MF	21	(Croatia) Đovani Roso		(substituted on) 86'
Manager:
(Croatia) Ante Miše

DINAMO ZAGREB:
GK	1	(Croatia) Tomislav Butina
DF	6	(Croatia) Dejan Lovren
DF	18	(Bosnia and Herzegovina) Mirko Hrgović	(yellow card) 30'
DF	19	(Croatia) Tomislav Barbarić
DF	22	(Croatia) Igor Bišćan (c)
MF	5	(Argentina) Adrián Calello
MF	10	(Brazil) Sammir
MF	13	(Cameroon) Mathias Chago		(substituted off) 90'
MF	16	(Croatia) Milan Badelj	(yellow card) 37'
FW	17	(Croatia) Mario Mandžukić
FW	24	(Croatia) Ilija Sivonjić		(substituted off) 55'
Substitutes:
MF	2	(Croatia) Ivan Tomečak		(substituted on) 55'
MF	77	(Chile) Pedro Morales		(substituted on) 90'
Manager:
(Croatia) Krunoslav Jurčić

Assistant referees:
Dalibor Conjar (Osijek)
Zdenko Mergeduš (Nova Gradiška)

Match rules

- 90 minutes.
- Penalty shoot-out if scores still level; no extra time.
- Seven named substitutes.
- Maximum of three substitutions.
