= 2008–09 in Croatian football =

Football in Croatia
- Season: 2008–09

2008–09 in Croatian football

First Division champions
- Dinamo Zagreb (11th title)

Second Division champions
- Istra 1961

Third Division champions
- Grafičar Vodovod (East); RNK Split (South); Rudeš (West)

Croatian Cup winners
- Dinamo Zagreb (10th title)

Teams in Europe
- Dinamo Zagreb, Hajduk Split, Rijeka, Slaven Belupo

Croatia national team
- 2010 World Cup qualification

The following article presents a summary of the 2008–09 football (soccer) season in Croatia, which was the 18th season of competitive football in the country.

== National team ==
The home team is on the left column; the away team is on the right column.

=== Friendly matches ===
20 August 2008

| Slovenia | 2 – 3 | Croatia |
|---|---|---|
| Šuler 4'; Šišić 55' (pen.) | Report (in Croatian) | Rakitić 37', 64'; Srna 59' (pen.) |

Ljudski vrt Maribor
Attendance: 8,000
Referee: Claudio Circhetta (Switzerland)

11 February 2009

| Romania | 1 – 2 | Croatia |
|---|---|---|
| Marica 22' | Report (in Croatian) | Rakitić 28'; Kranjčar 75' |

Steaua Stadium, Bucharest
Attendance: 6,000
Referee: Cristian Balaj (Romania)

=== World Cup qualifiers ===
Croatia is currently in Group 6 of the 2010 FIFA World Cup qualification process.

6 September 2008

| Croatia | 3 – 0 | Kazakhstan |
|---|---|---|
| N. Kovač 13'; Modrić 36'; Petrić 81' | Report |

Stadion Maksimir, Zagreb
Attendance: 17,424
Referee: Stefan Johannesson (Sweden)

10 September 2008

| Croatia | 1 – 4 | England |
|---|---|---|
| Mandžukić 78' | Report | Walcott 26' 59' 82'; Rooney 63' |

Stadion Maksimir, Zagreb
Attendance: 35,218
Referee: Lubos Michel (Slovakia)

11 October 2008

| Ukraine | 0 – 0 | Croatia |
|---|---|---|
| | Report |

Metalist Stadium, Kharkiv
Attendance: 38,500
Referee: Eric Braamhaar (Netherlands)

15 October 2008

| Croatia | 4 – 0 | Andorra |
|---|---|---|
| Rakitić 16' 87' (pen.); Olić 32'; Modrić 75' | Report |

Stadion Maksimir, Zagreb
Attendance: 14,441
Referee: István Vad (Hungary)

1 April 2009

| Andorra | 0 – 2 | Croatia |
|---|---|---|
| | Report | Klasnić 15'; Eduardo 35' |

Comunal, Andorra la Vella
Attendance: 1,100
Referee: Leontios Trattou (Cyprus)

6 June 2009

| Croatia | 2 – 2 | Ukraine |
|---|---|---|
| Petrić 2'; Modrić 68' | Report | Shevchenko 13'; Gai 54' |

Stadion Maksimir, Zagreb
Attendance: 32,073
Referee: Terje Hauge (Norway)

== League tables ==
=== Prva HNL ===
| Pos | Team | Pld | W | D | L | GF | GA | GD | Pts | Qualification or relegation |
|---|---|---|---|---|---|---|---|---|---|---|
| 1 | Dinamo Zagreb (C) | 33 | 23 | 5 | 5 | 71 | 26 | +45 | 74 | Qualification to Champions League second qualifying round |
| 2 | Hajduk Split | 33 | 21 | 5 | 7 | 59 | 25 | +34 | 68 | Qualification to Europa League third qualifying round |
| 3 | Rijeka | 33 | 17 | 5 | 11 | 50 | 44 | +6 | 56 | Qualification to Europa League second qualifying round |
| 4 | Slaven Belupo | 33 | 16 | 7 | 10 | 46 | 39 | +7 | 55 | Qualification to Europa League first qualifying round (Note: Because both cup finalists, Dinamo and Hajduk, qualified for Europe through their league positions, all three UEFA Europa League spots were given to teams according to their league positions, what means that fourth-placed Slaven Belupo also earned a spot in Europa League.) |
| 5 | NK Zagreb | 33 | 13 | 8 | 12 | 38 | 39 | −1 | 47 | |
| 6 | Šibenik | 33 | 13 | 7 | 13 | 44 | 35 | +9 | 46 | |
| 7 | Osijek | 33 | 10 | 11 | 12 | 40 | 41 | −1 | 41 | |
| 8 | Cibalia | 33 | 10 | 8 | 15 | 33 | 53 | −20 | 38 | |
| 9 | Inter Zaprešić | 33 | 9 | 9 | 15 | 41 | 50 | −9 | 36 | |
| 10 | Varteks | 33 | 10 | 5 | 18 | 41 | 55 | −14 | 35 | |
| 11 | Zadar | 33 | 7 | 8 | 18 | 28 | 49 | −21 | 29 | |
| 12 | Croatia Sesvete (Note: Croatia Sesvete were docked 1 point due to unpaid debts to Imotski over player Darko Vučić.) (O) | 33 | 6 | 8 | 19 | 31 | 66 | −35 | 25 | Qualification to relegation play-off |

Source: Sportnet.hr
Rules for classification: 1) points; 2) goal difference; 3) number of goals scored.
(C) Champions; (O) Play-off winners

=== Druga HNL ===
| Pos | Team | Pld | W | D | L | GF | GA | GD | Pts | Promotion or relegation |
|---|---|---|---|---|---|---|---|---|---|---|
| 1 | Istra 1961 (C, P) | 30 | 18 | 6 | 6 | 46 | 20 | +26 | 60 | Promotion to Croatian First Football League |
| 2 | Karlovac (P) | 30 | 18 | 5 | 7 | 50 | 24 | +26 | 59 | Promotion to Croatian First Football League |
| 3 | Lokomotiva (P) | 30 | 18 | 5 | 7 | 50 | 30 | +20 | 59 | Promotion to Croatian First Football League |
| 4 | Slavonac CO (Note: Slavonac CO had to step back from promotion after they were not able to find a satisfiable ground, and were demoted to the 1st county league; therefore Međimurje were promoted directly and Hrvatski Dragovoljac entered the playoff, while Moslavina were not relegated.) (R) | 30 | 15 | 12 | 3 | 39 | 18 | +21 | 57 | Relegation to county leagues |
| 5 | Međimurje (P) | 30 | 16 | 2 | 12 | 61 | 34 | +27 | 50 | Promotion to Croatian First Football League |
| 6 | Hrvatski Dragovoljac | 30 | 13 | 10 | 7 | 38 | 36 | +2 | 49 | Qualification to promotion play-offs |
| 7 | Solin | 30 | 14 | 5 | 11 | 37 | 31 | +6 | 47 | |
| 8 | Vinogradar | 30 | 11 | 7 | 12 | 40 | 50 | −10 | 40 | |
| 9 | Imotski | 30 | 10 | 4 | 16 | 31 | 45 | −14 | 34 | |
| 10 | Suhopolje | 30 | 8 | 9 | 13 | 33 | 37 | −4 | 33 | |
| 11 | Segesta | 30 | 8 | 9 | 13 | 33 | 47 | −14 | 33 | |
| 12 | Junak | 30 | 9 | 6 | 15 | 35 | 51 | −16 | 33 | |
| 13 | Pomorac | 30 | 9 | 5 | 16 | 29 | 45 | −16 | 32 | |
| 14 | Mosor | 30 | 8 | 6 | 16 | 25 | 44 | −19 | 30 | |
| 15 | Moslavina | 30 | 7 | 7 | 16 | 33 | 51 | −18 | 28 | |
| 16 | Trogir (R) | 30 | 3 | 12 | 15 | 32 | 49 | −17 | 21 | Relegation to Croatian Third Football League |

Source: Sportnet.hr (in Croatian)
Rules for classification: 1) points; 2) goal difference; 3) number of goals scored.
(C) Champions; (P) Promoted; (R) Relegated

=== Treća HNL ===
==== Division East ====
| Pos | Team | Pld | W | D | L | GF | GA | GD | Pts |
|---|---|---|---|---|---|---|---|---|---|
| 1 | Grafičar Vodovod (C) | 33 | 19 | 9 | 5 | 66 | 28 | +38 | 66 |
| 2 | Graničar | 33 | 20 | 6 | 7 | 69 | 47 | +22 | 66 |
| 3 | Križevci | 33 | 18 | 7 | 8 | 54 | 32 | +22 | 61 |
| 4 | Vukovar '91 (P) | 33 | 17 | 7 | 9 | 52 | 39 | +13 | 58 |
| 5 | NK Đakovo | 33 | 17 | 6 | 10 | 46 | 33 | +13 | 57 |
| 6 | Slavija Pleternica | 33 | 16 | 5 | 12 | 57 | 42 | +15 | 53 |
| 7 | Virovitica | 33 | 15 | 8 | 10 | 51 | 39 | +12 | 53 |
| 8 | Bjelovar | 33 | 15 | 7 | 11 | 54 | 49 | +5 | 52 |
| 9 | Nedelišće | 33 | 13 | 5 | 15 | 48 | 61 | −13 | 44 |
| 10 | Višnjevac | 33 | 14 | 1 | 18 | 47 | 57 | −10 | 43 |
| 11 | Mladost Cernik | 33 | 12 | 5 | 16 | 41 | 45 | −4 | 41 |
| 12 | Mladost Prelog | 33 | 11 | 8 | 14 | 54 | 61 | −7 | 41 |
| 13 | Olimpija Osijek | 33 | 11 | 8 | 14 | 53 | 60 | −7 | 41 |
| 14 | NAŠK | 33 | 10 | 7 | 16 | 47 | 52 | −5 | 37 |
| 15 | Croatia Đakovo (R) | 33 | 10 | 3 | 20 | 37 | 61 | −24 | 33 |
| 16 | Koprivnica (R) | 33 | 8 | 8 | 17 | 48 | 58 | −10 | 32 |
| 17 | Belišće (R) | 33 | 10 | 2 | 21 | 48 | 66 | −18 | 32 |
| 18 | Marsonia (R) | 17 | 1 | 2 | 14 | 12 | 54 | −42 | 5 |

(C) Champions; (P) Promoted; (R) Relegated

==== Division South ====
| Pos | Team | Pld | W | D | L | GF | GA | GD | Pts |
|---|---|---|---|---|---|---|---|---|---|
| 1 | RNK Split (C) | 34 | 23 | 8 | 3 | 79 | 20 | +59 | 77 |
| 2 | Raštane | 34 | 20 | 8 | 6 | 70 | 35 | +35 | 68 |
| 3 | Zmaj | 34 | 19 | 7 | 8 | 44 | 28 | +16 | 64 |
| 4 | Velebit | 34 | 17 | 8 | 9 | 54 | 35 | +19 | 59 |
| 5 | Primorac (BnM) | 34 | 17 | 5 | 12 | 59 | 42 | +17 | 56 |
| 6 | GOŠK (D) | 34 | 15 | 7 | 12 | 38 | 42 | −4 | 52 |
| 7 | Zagora | 34 | 14 | 8 | 12 | 47 | 44 | +3 | 50 |
| 8 | Konavljanin | 34 | 15 | 3 | 16 | 47 | 55 | −8 | 48 |
| 9 | Hrvace | 34 | 13 | 8 | 13 | 56 | 46 | +10 | 47 |
| 10 | Primorac 1929 | 34 | 15 | 2 | 17 | 52 | 62 | −10 | 47 |
| 11 | Jadran (KS) | 34 | 10 | 10 | 14 | 50 | 54 | −4 | 40 |
| 12 | Jadran LP | 34 | 12 | 4 | 18 | 31 | 49 | −18 | 40 |
| 13 | Dugopolje | 34 | 12 | 3 | 19 | 44 | 45 | −1 | 39 |
| 14 | Neretva | 34 | 9 | 11 | 14 | 39 | 54 | −15 | 38 |
| 15 | Neretvanac (R) | 34 | 10 | 7 | 17 | 38 | 57 | −19 | 37 |
| 16 | Omiš (R) | 34 | 9 | 8 | 17 | 28 | 41 | −13 | 35 |
| 17 | Val (R) | 34 | 11 | 1 | 22 | 35 | 66 | −31 | 34 |
| 18 | GOŠK (KG) (R) | 34 | 8 | 6 | 20 | 30 | 66 | −36 | 30 |

(C) Champions; (R) Relegated

==== Division West ====
| Pos | Team | Pld | W | D | L | GF | GA | GD | Pts |
|---|---|---|---|---|---|---|---|---|---|
| 1 | Rudeš (C) | 34 | 22 | 10 | 2 | 63 | 24 | +39 | 76 |
| 2 | Lučko (P) | 34 | 19 | 7 | 8 | 75 | 45 | +30 | 64 |
| 3 | Vrapče | 34 | 16 | 8 | 10 | 58 | 45 | +13 | 56 |
| 4 | Jadran Poreč | 34 | 17 | 5 | 12 | 46 | 34 | +12 | 56 |
| 5 | Polet Buševec | 34 | 14 | 6 | 14 | 59 | 51 | +8 | 48 |
| 6 | HAŠK | 34 | 15 | 3 | 16 | 56 | 53 | +3 | 48 |
| 7 | Novalja | 34 | 13 | 9 | 12 | 40 | 39 | +1 | 48 |
| 8 | Rovinj | 34 | 10 | 14 | 10 | 59 | 48 | +11 | 44 |
| 9 | Rudar Labin | 34 | 12 | 8 | 14 | 48 | 51 | −3 | 44 |
| 10 | Nehaj | 34 | 12 | 8 | 14 | 37 | 41 | −4 | 44 |
| 11 | Vrbovec | 34 | 12 | 8 | 14 | 39 | 45 | −6 | 44 |
| 12 | Grobničan | 34 | 13 | 4 | 17 | 40 | 58 | −18 | 43 |
| 13 | Orijent | 34 | 12 | 8 | 14 | 45 | 41 | +4 | 42 (Note: 2 points deducted?) |
| 14 | Medulin 1921 | 34 | 11 | 9 | 14 | 43 | 49 | −6 | 42 |
| 15 | Radnik (R) | 34 | 11 | 7 | 16 | 38 | 46 | −8 | 40 |
| 16 | Maksimir (R) | 34 | 10 | 10 | 14 | 34 | 52 | −18 | 40 |
| 17 | Istra Pula (R) | 34 | 10 | 7 | 17 | 36 | 67 | −31 | 35 (Note: 2 points deducted?) |
| 18 | Samobor (R) | 34 | 6 | 11 | 17 | 35 | 62 | −27 | 29 |

(C) Champions; (P) Promoted; (R) Relegated

== Honours ==
| Competition | Winner | Details |
|---|---|---|
| Croatian Cup | Dinamo Zagreb | 2008–09 Croatian Cup; Beat Hajduk Split 4–3 on penalties (3–3 on aggregate) |
| 1.HNL | Dinamo Zagreb | 2008–09 Prva HNL |
| 2.HNL | Istra 1961 | 2008–09 Druga HNL |
| 3.HNL East Division | Grafičar Vodovod | |
| 3.HNL South Division | RNK Split | |
| 3.HNL West Division | Rudeš | |

== Croatian clubs in Europe ==
=== Summary ===
| Club | Competition | Final round |
|---|---|---|
| Dinamo Zagreb | UEFA Champions League; UEFA Cup | Third qualifying round Group stage |
| Slaven Belupo | UEFA Cup | First round |
| Hajduk Split | UEFA Cup | Second qualifying round |
| Rijeka | UEFA Intertoto Cup | First round |

=== Dinamo Zagreb ===
| Date | Venue | Opponents | Score | Dinamo scorer(s) | Report |
Champions League - First qualifying round
| 16 July | Windsor Park, Belfast (A) | (Northern Ireland) Linfield | 2–0 | Mario Mandžukić, Dino Drpić | uefa.com |
| 23 July | Maksimir, Zagreb (H) | (Northern Ireland) Linfield | 1–1 | Mario Mandžukić | uefa.com |
Champions League - Second qualifying round
| 30 July | Sports Park, Domžale (A) | (Slovenia) Domžale | 3–0 | Ivica Vrdoljak, Sammir, Josip Tadić | uefa.com |
| 6 August | Maksimir, Zagreb (H) | (Slovenia) Domžale | 3–2 | Igor Bišćan, Mirko Hrgović, Dino Drpić | uefa.com |
Champions League - Third qualifying round
| 13 August | RSC Olimpiyskiy, Donetsk (A) | (Ukraine) Shakhtar Donetsk | 0–2 | | uefa.com |
| 27 August | Maksimir, Zagreb (H) | (Ukraine) Shakhtar Donetsk | 1–3 | Boško Balaban | uefa.com |
UEFA Cup - First round
| 18 September | Maksimir, Zagreb (H) | (Czech Republic) Sparta Prague | 0–0 | | uefa.com |
| 2 October | AXA Arena, Prague (A) | (Czech Republic) Sparta Prague | 3–3 | Pedro Morales, Dejan Lovren, Milan Badelj | uefa.com |
UEFA Cup - Group stage
| 23 October | Maksimir, Zagreb (H) | (Netherlands) NEC | 3–2 | Mario Mandžukić, Boško Balaban, Ivica Vrdoljak | uefa.com |
| 6 November | White Hart Lane, London (A) | (England) Tottenham Hotspur | 0–4 | | uefa.com |
| 27 November | Maksimir, Zagreb (H) | (Russia) Spartak Moscow | 0–1 | | uefa.com |
| 3 December | Stadio Friuli, Udine (A) | (Italy) Udinese | 1–2 | Igor Bišćan | uefa.com |

=== Slaven Belupo ===
| Date | Venue | Opponents | Score | Slaven scorer(s) | Report |
UEFA Cup - First qualifying round
| 17 July | Ta' Qali Stadium, Ta' Qali (A) | (Malta) Marsaxlokk | 4–0 | Matija Kristić, Dalibor Poldrugač, Franjo Tepurić, Bojan Vručina | uefa.com |
| 31 July | Gradski stadion, Koprivnica (H) | (Malta) Marsaxlokk | 4–0 | Mario Bilen, Kristijan Čaval, Bojan Vručina (2) | uefa.com |
UEFA Cup - Second qualifying round
| 14 August | Kleanthis Vikelidis, (A) | (Greece) Aris | 0–1 | | uefa.com |
| 28 August | Gradski stadion, Koprivnica (H) | (Greece) Aris | 2–0 | Bojan Vručina (2) | uefa.com |
UEFA Cup - First round
| 18 September | Gradski stadion, Koprivnica (H) | (Russia) CSKA Moscow | 1–2 | Mario Jurić | uefa.com |
| 30 September | Luzhniki, Moscow (A) | (Russia) CSKA Moscow | 0–1 | | uefa.com |

=== Hajduk Split ===
| Date | Venue | Opponents | Score | Hajduk scorer(s) | Report |
UEFA Cup - First qualifying round
| 17 July | Poljud, Split (H) | (Malta) Birkirkara | 4–0 | Senijad Ibričić, Nikola Kalinić, Tomislav Bušić, Mario Tičinović | uefa.com |
| 31 July | Ta' Qali Stadium, Ta' Qali (A) | (Malta) Birkirkara | 3–0 | Ivan Strinić, Mladen Bartolović, Senijad Ibričić | uefa.com |
UEFA Cup - Second qualifying round
| 14 August | Riazor, La Coruña (A) | (Spain) Deportivo La Coruña | 0–0 | | uefa.com |
| 28 August | Poljud, Split (H) | (Spain) Deportivo La Coruña | 0–2 | | uefa.com |

=== Rijeka ===
| Date | Venue | Opponents | Score | Rijeka scorer(s) | Report |
Intertoto Cup - First round
| 21 June | Kantrida, Rijeka (H) | (North Macedonia) Renova | 0–0 | | |
| 28 June | Gradski stadion, Skopje (A) | (North Macedonia) Renova | 0–2 | | |
