= 2010 Croatian Football Cup final =

- Event: 2009–10 Croatian Cup
Hajduk Split	Šibenik
4	1

First leg
Hajduk Split	Šibenik
2	1
- Date: 21 April 2010
- Venue: Stadion Poljud, Split
- Man of the Match: Goran Blažević (Šibenik)
- Referee: Draženko Kovačić (Križevci)
- Attendance: 15,000
- Weather: Clear; 20 °C (68 °F)

Second leg
Šibenik	Hajduk Split
0	2
- Date: 5 May 2010
- Venue: Stadion Šubićevac, Šibenik
- Man of the Match: Senijad Ibričić (Hajduk Split)
- Referee: Domagoj Vučkov (Rijeka)
- Attendance: 5,500
- Weather: Clear; 23 °C (73 °F)

The 2010 Croatian Cup final was a two-legged affair played between Hajduk Split and Šibenik. The first leg was played in Split on 21 April 2010, with the second leg on 5 May 2010 in Šibenik.

Hajduk Split won the trophy with an aggregate result of 4–1.

== Road to the final ==
Hajduk Split		Round	Šibenik	
Opponent	Result		Opponent	Result
Lipik	5–3	First round	Belišće	3–0
Moslavina	5–1	Second round	Rijeka	4–0
NK Zagreb	0–0	Quarter-finals	Osijek	1–1
NK Zagreb	4–1	Quarter-finals	Osijek	4–0
Dinamo Zagreb	0–0	Semi-finals	Varteks	0–0
Dinamo Zagreb	1–0	Semi-finals	Varteks	2–0

== First leg ==
21 April 2010
17:30

Hajduk Split	2–1	Šibenik
Tičinović 62'; Ibričić 88'	Report (in Croatian)	Zec 65' (pen.)

Stadion Poljud, Split
Attendance: 15,000
Referee: Draženko Kovačić (Križevci)

Hajduk Split	Šibenik

HAJDUK SPLIT:
GK	1	(Croatia) Danijel Subašić
DF	5	(Croatia) Jurica Buljat
DF	17	(Croatia) Ivan Strinić
DF	18	(Croatia) Mirko Oremuš		(substituted off) 61'
DF	22	(Croatia) Mario Maloča
MF	10	(Bosnia and Herzegovina) Senijad Ibričić
MF	20	(Australia) Josip Skoko (c)
MF	30	(Croatia) Marin Ljubičić	(yellow card) 72'
MF	50	(Romania) Florin Cernat		(substituted off) 70'
MF	99	(Croatia) Anas Sharbini		(substituted off) 83'
FW	13	(Croatia) Ante Vukušić	(yellow card) 90'
Substitutes:
MF	24	(Croatia) Mario Tičinović		(substituted on) 61'
MF	11	(Croatia) Srđan Andrić		(substituted on) 70'
MF	14	(Croatia) Marin Tomasov		(substituted on) 83'
Manager:
(Croatia) Stanko Poklepović

ŠIBENIK:
GK	1	(Croatia) Goran Blažević
DF	3	(Croatia) Igor Budiša	(yellow card) 84'
DF	4	(Bosnia and Herzegovina) Velimir Vidić
DF	8	(Croatia) Ivan Elez	(yellow card) 74'
DF	19	(Croatia) Ivan Fuštar		(substituted off) 74'
MF	10	(Bosnia and Herzegovina) Mehmed Alispahić	(yellow card) 87'
MF	11	(North Macedonia) Zeni Husmani	(yellow card) 83'
MF	14	(Croatia) Stipe Bačelić-Grgić		(substituted off) 88'
MF	20	(Croatia) Arijan Ademi (c)
MF	24	(Croatia) Ante Bulat	(yellow card) 23'
FW	7	(Bosnia and Herzegovina) Ermin Zec
Substitutes:
FW	21	(Bosnia and Herzegovina) Ivan Božić		(substituted on) 74'	(substituted off) 90+1'
MF	29	(Slovenia) Sandro Bloudek		(substituted on) 88'
MF	17	(Croatia) Antonio Jakoliš		(substituted on) 90+1'
Manager:
(Croatia) Branko Karačić

Assistant referees:
Tomislav Petrović (Osijek)
Josip Havaić (Koprivnica)

Match rules

- 90 minutes.
- Seven named substitutes.
- Maximum of three substitutions.

== Second leg ==
5 May 2010
17:30

Šibenik	0–2	Hajduk Split
	Report (in Croatian)	Vukušić 16'; Ibričić 90+3' (pen.)

Stadion Šubićevac, Šibenik
Attendance: 5,500
Referee: Domagoj Vučkov (Rijeka)

Šibenik	Hajduk Split

ŠIBENIK:
GK	1	(Croatia) Goran Blažević
DF	3	(Croatia) Igor Budiša
DF	4	(Bosnia and Herzegovina) Velimir Vidić
DF	18	(Bosnia and Herzegovina) Ivan Medvid
MF	11	(North Macedonia) Zeni Husmani		(substituted off) 71'
MF	14	(Croatia) Stipe Bačelić-Grgić
MF	20	(Croatia) Arijan Ademi (c)
MF	24	(Croatia) Ante Bulat	(yellow card) 90+2'
MF	29	(Slovenia) Sandro Bloudek	(yellow card) 39'	(substituted off) 62'
FW	7	(Bosnia and Herzegovina) Ermin Zec	(yellow card) 89'
FW	9	(Bosnia and Herzegovina) Jusuf Dajić		(substituted off) 46'
Substitutes:
DF	19	(Croatia) Ivan Fuštar		(substituted on) 46'
DF	8	(Croatia) Ivan Elez		(substituted on) 62'
MF	17	(Croatia) Antonio Jakoliš		(substituted on) 71'
Manager:
(Croatia) Branko Karačić

HAJDUK SPLIT:
GK	1	(Croatia) Danijel Subašić
DF	5	(Croatia) Jurica Buljat
DF	17	(Croatia) Ivan Strinić
DF	22	(Croatia) Mario Maloča
DF	26	(Croatia) Goran Rubil
MF	10	(Bosnia and Herzegovina) Senijad Ibričić
MF	11	(Croatia) Srđan Andrić (c)
MF	18	(Croatia) Mirko Oremuš		(substituted off) 46'
MF	20	(Australia) Josip Skoko	(yellow card) 78'	(substituted off) 79'
MF	99	(Croatia) Anas Sharbini		(substituted off) 85'
FW	13	(Croatia) Ante Vukušić
Substitutes:
MF	30	(Croatia) Marin Ljubičić		(substituted on) 46'
DF	11	(Bosnia and Herzegovina) Boris Pandža		(substituted on) 79'
MF	24	(Croatia) Mario Tičinović		(substituted on) 85'
Manager:
(Croatia) Stanko Poklepović

Assistant referees:
Željko Novosel (Vrbovec)
Igor Krmar (Zagreb)

Match rules

- 90 minutes.
- Penalty shoot-out if scores still level; no extra time.
- Seven named substitutes.
- Maximum of three substitutions.
