= 2008–09 Croatian Football Cup =

Tournament details
- Country: Croatia
- Teams: 48

Final positions
- Champions: Dinamo Zagreb (10th title)
- Runners-up: Hajduk Split

Tournament statistics
- Matches played: 53
- Goals scored: 178 (3.36 per match)
- Top goal scorer: Josip Fuček (6)

The 2008–09 Croatian Football Cup was the eighteenth season of Croatia's football knockout competition. Dinamo Zagreb were the defending champions since they won the last year's cup by defeating Hajduk Split 3–0 on aggregate.

== Calendar ==
Round	Main date	Number of fixtures	Clubs	New entries this round
Preliminary round	27 August 2008	16	48 → 32	none
First round	23 and 24 September 2008	16	32 → 16	16
Second round	29 October 2008	8	16 → 8	none
Quarter-finals	12 and 26 November 2008	8	8 → 4	none
Semi-finals	4 and 18 March 2009	4	4 → 2	none
Final	13 and 28 May 2009	2	2 → 1	none

== Preliminary round ==
The preliminary round was held on 27 August 2008.

Tie no	Home team	Score	Away team
1	Žminj	0–2	Gaj Mače
2	Moslavina	7–0	Istra Tar
3	Croatia Đakovo	1–3	Polet Buševec
4	Bjelovar	2–4	Zagora Unešić
5	Orijent	1–0	Raštane
6	Novalja	0–1	Metalac Sisak
7	Međimurje	3–0	Trogir
8	Suhopolje	1–1 (5–4 p)	Križevci
9	Mladost Cernik	2–0	Slavija Pleternica
10	Vukovar '91	3–2	Podravina
11	Nedelišće	1–3	Karlovac
12	Garić Garešnica	1–4	Grafičar Vodovod
13	Mladost Molve	3–4 (aet)	Konavljanin
14	Hrvatski Dragovoljac	1–0	Graničar
15	Lučko	11–1	Sračinec
16	Vinogradar	1–2	Oriolik

== First round ==
The matches were played on 23 and 24 September 2008.

Tie no	Home team	Score	Away team
1	Gaj Mače	1–5	Dinamo Zagreb
2	Metalac Sisak	0–6	Rijeka
3	Orijent	1–4	Hajduk Split
4	Mladost Cernik	0–1	Varteks
5	Polet Buševec	0–2	Slaven Belupo
6	Zagora Unešić	2–1	Osijek
7	Grafičar Vodovod	1–3	NK Zagreb
8	Suhopolje	1–2	Cibalia
9	Oriolik	w/o^{1}	Kamen Ingrad
10	Lučko	3–5	Inter Zaprešić
11	Karlovac	1–1 (7–6 p)	Istra 1961
12	Moslavina	2–1	Šibenik
13	Vukovar '91	0–1	Pomorac
14	Konavljanin	1–0	Belišće
15	Zadar	3–0	Naftaš HAŠK
16	Hrvatski Dragovoljac	1–0	Međimurje

^{1}Due to financial difficulties, Kamen Ingrad ceased competing on a senior professional level, and therefore withdrew from the competition.

== Second round ==
The matches were played on 29 October 2008.

Tie no	Home team	Score	Away team
1	Hrvatski Dragovoljac	0–6	Dinamo Zagreb
2	Zadar	2–2 (6–7 p)	Rijeka
3	Konavljanin	0–2	Hajduk Split
4	Pomorac	2–0	Varteks
5	Moslavina	0–2	Slaven Belupo
6	Zagora Unešić	2–1	Karlovac
7	Inter Zaprešić	0–2	NK Zagreb
8	Oriolik	0–4	Cibalia

== Quarter-finals ==
The draw was held on 30 October. First legs were held on 12 November and second legs on 26 November 2008.

Team 1	Agg.	Team 2	1st leg	2nd leg
Rijeka	4–4 (2–4 p)	NK Zagreb	2–2	2–2 (aet)
Pomorac	2–2 (2–4 p)	Cibalia	1–1	1–1 (aet)
Hajduk Split	0–0 (7–6 p)	Slaven Belupo	0–0	0–0 (aet)
Zagora Unešić	2–7	Dinamo Zagreb	1–2	1–5

== Semi-finals ==
4 March 2009
17:00 CET

NK Zagreb	0–2	Dinamo Zagreb
	Report (in Croatian)	Sivonjić 29'; Morales 55'

Stadion Kranjčevićeva, Zagreb
Attendance: 2,500
Referee: Marijo Strahonja (Zagreb)
18 March 2009
17:00 CET

Dinamo Zagreb	4–1	NK Zagreb
Mandžukić 10', 18', 38'; Morales 88'	Report (in Croatian)	Vugrinec 87' (pen.)

Stadion Maksimir, Zagreb
Attendance: 1,000
Referee: Igor Pristovnik (Zagreb)

Dinamo Zagreb won 6–1 on aggregate

4 March 2009
15:30 CET

Hajduk Split	4–1	Cibalia
Tomasov 12'; Gabrić 34'; Oremuš 37'; Pandža 85'	Report (in Croatian)	Malčić 29'

Stadion Poljud, Split
Attendance: 5,000
Referee: Domagoj Vučkov (Rijeka)
18 March 2009
17:00 CET

Cibalia	0–0	Hajduk Split
	Report (in Croatian)

Stadion HNK Cibalia, Vinkovci
Attendance: 2,500
Referee: Danijel Trampus (Osijek)

Hajduk Split won 4–1 on aggregate

== Final ==
=== First leg ===
13 May 2009
20:15

Dinamo Zagreb	3–0	Hajduk Split
Mandžukić 13', 57'; Sammir 29' (pen.)	Report (in Croatian)

Stadion Maksimir, Zagreb
Attendance: 20,000
Referee: Bruno Marić (Daruvar)

=== Second leg ===
28 May 2009
20:00

Hajduk Split	3–0	Dinamo Zagreb
Kalinić 56', 75'; Bartolović 58'	Report (in Croatian)
Penalties
Kalinić (penalty scored); Roso (penalty missed); Bartolović (penalty scored); Ibričić (penalty scored); Andrić (penalty missed)	3–4	(penalty scored) Bišćan; (penalty scored) Sammir; (penalty scored) Badelj; (penalty scored) Morales; (penalty missed) Hrgović

Stadion Poljud, Split
Attendance: 18,000
Referee: Domagoj Ljubičić (Osijek)

3–3 on aggregate. Dinamo Zagreb won 4–3 in penalty shootout.

== See also ==
- 2008–09 Croatian First Football League
- 2008–09 Croatian Second Football League
