= Goran Brašnić =

Bosnian footballer (born 1973)

Personal information
- Date of birth: 26 September 1973 (age 53)
- Place of birth: Gradačac, SR Bosnia and Herzegovina, SFR Yugoslavia
- Height: 1.90 m (6 ft 3 in)
- Position: Goalkeeper

Senior career*
Years	Team	Apps	(Gls)
2001–2002	Troglav Livno		
2002–2005	Žepče	43	(0)
2006–2007	Inter Zaprešić	44	(0)
2007–2008	Segesta	26	(0)
2010–2012	Sông Lam Nghệ An	17	(0)

International career
2004–2008	Bosnia and Herzegovina	8	(0)

Managerial career
- ?–: Bosnia and Herzegovina U19 (goalkeeping coach)
- 2017–2018: NK Čelik Zenica (goalkeeping coach)
- 2020: Bosnia and Herzegovina (goalkeeping coach)
- 2022–2023: Auda (goalkeeping coach)
- 2023–2024: Riga (goalkeeping coach)
- 2024: CSKA Sofia (goalkeeping coach)
- 2025-: NK Krivaja
- * Club domestic league appearances and goals

Goran Brašnić (born 26 September 1973) is a Bosnian former professional football goalkeeper.

== Club career ==
Brašnić left Troglav Livno in summer 2002 due to the club relegated to the First League of FBiH and joined the new promoted side Žepče. He played in the Premier League of BiH until signed by Prva HNL side Inter Zaprešić in mid of 2005–06 season.

== International career ==
Brašnić was called-up to the Bosnia and Herzegovina national team in September 2003, at age of 29. He earned his second call-up in February 2004, and made his debut in the 85th minute, replacing Almir Tolja and has earned a total of eight caps. His final international was a November 2008 friendly match against Slovenia.

== Coaching career ==
In January 2023 Brašnić was appointed goalkeeping coach of Latvian Higher League club Riga, following manager Tomislav Stipić having worked together the previous season at Auda.
