= 2006–07 Croatian First Football League =

Prva HNL Ožujsko
- Season: 2006–07
- Champions: Dinamo Zagreb; 9th Croatian title 13th domestic title
- Runner up: Hajduk Split
- Relegated: Kamen Ingrad; Pula
- Champions League: Dinamo Zagreb
- UEFA Cup: Hajduk Split; Slaven Belupo (via Cup)
- Intertoto Cup: NK Zagreb
- Matches: 198
- Goals: 561 (2.83 per match)
- Top goalscorer: Eduardo da Silva (34)
- Biggest home win: Osijek 6–1 Međimurje
- Biggest away win: Kamen I. 0–6 Zagreb
- Highest scoring: Osijek 6–1 Međimurje; 4–3 four matches
- Average attendance: 3,067

The 2006–07 Croatian First Football League (also known as 1. HNL; officially styled as Prva HNL Ožujsko for sponsorship reasons) was the sixteenth season of the Croatian First Football League, the national championship for men's association football teams in Croatia, since its establishment in 1992. The season started on 29 July 2006 and ended on 19 May 2007. Dinamo Zagreb were the defending champions, having won their eleventh championship title the previous season, and they defended the title again, after a win against Međimurje on Matchday 29, played on 28 April 2007.

== Teams ==
=== Stadia and personnel ===
Locations of teams in 2006–07 Prva HNL

Team	Manager^{1}	Location	Stadium	Capacity
Cibalia	(Croatia) Mile Petković	Vinkovci	Stadion HNK Cibalia	10,000
Dinamo Zagreb	(Croatia) Branko Ivanković	Zagreb	Stadion Maksimir	37,168
Hajduk Split	(Croatia) Ivan Pudar	Split	Stadion Poljud	35,000
Kamen Ingrad	(Croatia) Dalibor Bognar	Velika	Stadion Kamen Ingrad	8,000
Međimurje	(Croatia) Želimir Orehovec	Čakovec	Stadion SRC Mladost	8,000
Osijek	(Croatia) Ilija Lončarević	Osijek	Stadion Gradski vrt	19,500
Pula	(Croatia) Stanko Mršić	Pula	Stadion Veruda	3,000
Rijeka	(Croatia) Josip Kuže	Rijeka	Stadion Kantrida	10,275
Slaven Belupo	(Croatia) Elvis Scoria	Koprivnica	Gradski stadion u Koprivnici	4,000
Šibenik	(Croatia) Anel Karabeg	Šibenik	Stadion Šubićevac	8,000
Varteks	(Croatia) Zlatko Dalić	Varaždin	Stadion Varteks	10,800
NK Zagreb	(Croatia) Miroslav Blažević	Zagreb	Stadion Kranjčevićeva	8,850

- ^{1} On final match day of the season, played on 19 May 2007.

== League table ==
Pos	Team	Pld	W	D	L	GF	GA	GD	Pts	Qualification or relegation
1	Dinamo Zagreb (C)	33	30	2	1	84	22	+62	92	Qualification to Champions League first qualifying round
2	Hajduk Split	33	22	6	5	60	25	+35	72	Qualification to UEFA Cup first qualifying round
3	NK Zagreb	33	18	4	11	57	40	+17	58	Qualification to Intertoto Cup first round
4	Šibenik	33	14	7	12	50	47	+3	49	
5	Slaven Belupo (Note: Qualified for Europe as 2006–07 Croatian Football Cup finalists.)	33	14	7	12	40	37	+3	49	Qualification to UEFA Cup first qualifying round
6	Osijek	33	11	10	12	42	45	−3	43	
7	Rijeka	33	12	6	15	51	53	−2	42	
8	Varteks	33	12	6	15	49	62	−13	42	
9	Međimurje	33	11	4	18	40	60	−20	37	
10	Cibalia	33	9	5	19	33	53	−20	32	
11	Pula (R)	33	6	11	16	28	40	−12	29	Qualification to relegation play-off
12	Kamen Ingrad (Note: Kamen Ingrad were docked 2 points.) (R)	33	3	4	26	27	77	−50	11	Relegation to Croatian Second Football League

Source: prva-hnl.hr (in Croatian)
Rules for classification: 1) points; 2) goal difference; 3) number of goals scored.
(C) Champions; (R) Relegated

== Results ==
The schedule consisted of three rounds. During the first two rounds, each team played each other once home and away for a total of 22 matches. The pairings of the third round were then set according to the standings after the first two rounds, giving every team a third game against each opponent for a total of 33 games per team.

Home \ Away	CIB	DIN	HAJ	KAM	MEĐ	OSI	PUL	RIJ	SLA	ŠIB	VAR	ZAG	CIB	DIN	HAJ	KAM	MEĐ	OSI	PUL	RIJ	SLA	ŠIB	VAR	ZAG
Cibalia		0–1	0–0	1–3	0–3	3–0	3–1	3–4	2–0	0–1	1–2	0–1			0–1		3–0		1–0			2–1	1–0	
Dinamo Zagreb	4–0		2–1	2–0	4–1	1–0	5–1	1–0	1–0	4–3	4–1	2–1	4–0		3–0		4–1	1–0		1–0		3–0		
Hajduk Split	2–0	2–2		4–0	2–0	3–0	2–0	3–0	2–0	3–0	3–1	2–0				4–0			0–1	2–2	1–1		2–0	3–1
Kamen Ingrad	2–2	0–2	2–3		0–2	1–1	1–0	0–1	1–3	3–1	1–4	1–3	1–3	0–1				0–2			1–2			0–6
Međimurje	3–1	2–3	0–2	2–0		2–0	1–0	1–2	0–3	2–1	5–1	2–0			2–4	1–1			1–0	1–1		0–1	1–2	
Osijek	3–1	0–4	1–0	2–1	1–1		0–0	1–0	1–1	1–1	4–1	1–1	2–2		1–2		6–1					2–2	1–0	
Pula	0–0	0–2	0–0	2–0	3–0	2–2		2–3	2–1	1–1	1–1	0–2		1–2		0–0		3–1			0–0			2–3
Rijeka	4–1	2–3	0–1	4–2	1–3	2–2	2–0		2–0	1–3	2–2	2–1	1–2			2–0		0–2	1–1				3–0	
Slaven Belupo	2–0	1–1	0–1	2–1	1–0	1–0	1–0	3–2		1–1	3–2	0–1	1–0	0–3			2–0	0–1		3–0				4–2
Šibenik	1–0	2–1	1–2	4–1	3–0	1–2	1–0	2–2	2–1		2–0	1–0			2–2	3–1			1–0	3–1	0–0		3–4	
Varteks	1–0	1–3	0–1	3–0	3–1	3–1	0–0	2–1	0–0	2–1		1–3		2–3		3–2			2–2		4–3			1–1
NK Zagreb	3–0	0–3	3–0	2–1	4–0	2–0	0–3	1–0	3–0	3–0	3–0		1–1	0–4			1–1	2–1		1–3		2–1		

Source: Sportnet.hr
Legend: Blue = home team win; Yellow = draw; Red = away team win.

=== Relegation play-off ===
==== First leg ====
27 May 2007

Zadar	3–0	Pula
Terkeš 12'; Župan 45' (pen.); Barnjak 67' (pen.)	Report (in Croatian)

Stadion Stanovi, Zadar
Attendance: 5,000
Referee: Vlado Svilokos (Sisak)

==== Second leg ====
30 May 2007

Pula	2–3	Zadar
Raić-Sudar 8'; Halilović 72'	Report (in Croatian)	Terkeš 42', 74'; Surać 71'

Stadion Veruda, Pula
Attendance: 1,500
Referee: Ivan Bebek (Rijeka)

Zadar win 6–2 on aggregate and are promoted to 2007–08 Prva HNL.

== Top goalscorers ==
Rank	Player	Club	Goals
1	(Croatia) Eduardo da Silva	Dinamo Zagreb	34
2	(Croatia) Ahmad Sharbini	Rijeka	21
3	(Croatia) Krunoslav Lovrek	NK Zagreb	18
4	(Croatia) Enes Novinić	Varteks	15
5	(Bosnia and Herzegovina) Mladen Bartolović	Hajduk Split	12
5	(Croatia) Davor Vugrinec	Dinamo Zagreb	12
5	(Croatia) Zoran Zekić	Cibalia	12
8	(Croatia) Tomislav Bušić	Hajduk Split	11
8	(Croatia) Mario Mandžukić	NK Zagreb	11
8	(Croatia) Bojan Vručina	Slaven Belupo	11

== Attendances ==
#	Club	Average
1	Hajduk	7,559
2	Dinamo Zagreb	7,265
3	Šibenik	3,500
4	Osijek	2,744
5	Varteks	2,500
6	Rijeka	2,150
7	Slaven	2,012
8	Zagreb	1,965
9	Cibalia	1,775
10	Međimurje	1,612
11	Istra	1,531
12	Kamen	1,281

== See also ==
- 2006–07 Croatian Second Football League
- 2006–07 Croatian Football Cup
