= Dragan Župan =

Croatian footballer

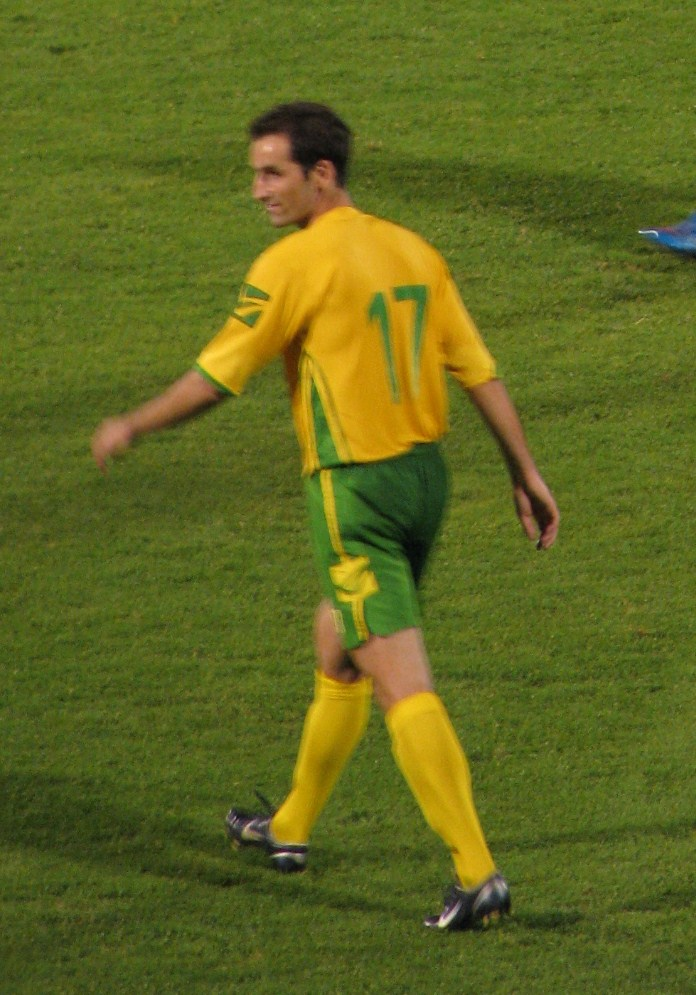
- Župan in 2009

Personal information
- Date of birth: 29 November 1982 (age 43)
- Place of birth: Zadar, SFR Yugoslavia
- Height: 1.82 m (6 ft 0 in)
- Position: Midfielder

Team information
- Current team: Zagora Unešić
- Number: 20

Youth career
- Zadar
- Hajduk Split

Senior career*
Years	Team	Apps	(Gls)
–2001	Hajduk Split		
2001–2002	Uskok		
2002–2004	Šibenik	23+	(2+)
2004–2005	Posušje	0	(0)
2005–2006	Zadar	7	(4)
2006	Međimurje	9	(0)
2006–2009	Zadar	71	(18)
2009–2010	Istra 1961	23	(2)
2010–2012	Raštane	44	(19)
2012–2013	Zadar	5	(0)
2013–2014	Primorac Biograd	13	(3)
2014	Velebit		
2014–2016	Škabrnja		
2016–2020	Zadar	83	(12)
2020–	Zagora Unešić		
- * Club domestic league appearances and goals

Dragan Župan (born 29 November 1982) is a Croatian footballer that currently plays in the Treća HNL for Zagora Unešić.

== Career ==
Župan started his career at Hajduk Split. After that, he played for NK Uskok Klis, HNK Šibenik and NK Posušje. In 2005, he signed for NK Zadar, which at that time was playing in Druga HNL. After a short episode in Međimurje in 2006, he returns to Zadar, where he played for the next three seasons including to two of the Prva HNL. In 2009, he moved to NK Istra 1961, where he played until 2010 before joining NK Raštane, a third-tier team . In season 2012/13 season, he returned to NK Zadar.
