= Nicolás Nynkeu =

Cameroonian footballer

Personal information
- Full name: Nicolás Niverge Nynkeu
- Date of birth: 14 December 1982 (age 43)
- Place of birth: Douala, Cameroon
- Height: 1.78 m (5 ft 10 in)
- Position: Midfielder

Youth career
- –2000: AS Babimbi

Senior career*
Years	Team	Apps	(Gls)
2000–2003	AS Babimbi		
2003–2004	Kiseljak		
2004–2006	Žepče		
2006	Junak Sinj		
2007	Croatia Sesvete	1	(0)
2007–2008	Hrvatski Dragovoljac	13	(0)
2008–2011	Slaven Belupo	51	(1)
2011–2012	Vinogradar	9	(0)
2012–2014	Međimurje	13	(3)
2014	Vrbovec	20	(0)
2014–2016	Savski Marof		
- * Club domestic league appearances and goals

Nicolás Niverge Nynkeu (born 14 December 1982) is a Cameroonian former footballer who played as a midfielder.

Born in Douala, Nynkeu started his career with local club AS Babimbi in 2000, before signing for Bosnian side Kiseljak in 2003. After spending a year as a player at Kiseljak, Nynkeu moved to Žepče, where he first started playing professionally. In July 2006 he left for Croatian lower level side Junak Sinj, where he stayed for six months and then had spells with Croatia Sesvete and Hrvatski Dragovoljac before joining Slaven Belupo in July 2008. In 2011 Nynkeu moved to Vinogradar.
