= NK Mladost Cernik =

Croatian football club

- Full name: NK Mladost Cernik
- Founded: 1948
- Ground: NK Mladost, Cernik
- Capacity: 5,000
- Manager: Dinko Terzić
- League: Croatian Third Football League East

NK Mladost Cernik is a Croatian football club based in the village of Cernik in the Brod-Posavina County in Slavonia. As of 2016, Mladost Cernik is currently playing in Croatian Third Football League East.
