= Jurica Buljat =

Croatian footballer (born 1986)

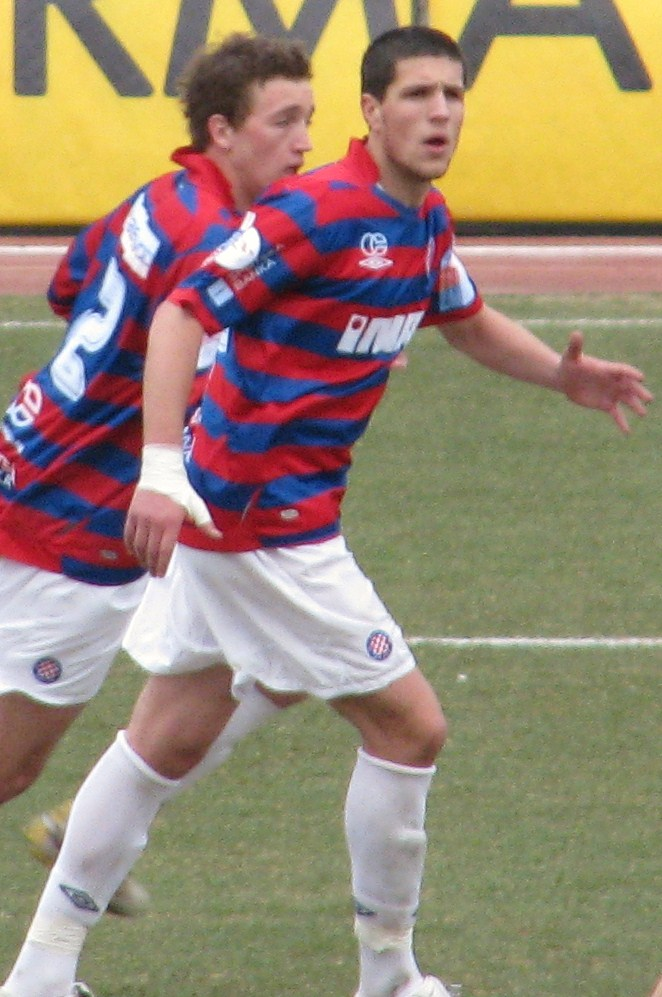
- Buljat with Hajduk Split in 2010

Personal information
- Date of birth: 12 September 1986 (age 40)
- Place of birth: Zadar, SR Croatia, Yugoslavia
- Height: 1.87 m (6 ft 2 in)
- Position: Centre back

Youth career
- NK Zemunik
- NK Zadar

Senior career*
Years	Team	Apps	(Gls)
2004–2005	Zadar	31	(4)
2005–2011	Hajduk Split	98	(2)
2011–2012	Maccabi Haifa	31	(0)
2013	NK Zadar	9	(1)
2013–2014	Energie Cottbus	24	(0)
2014–2015	NK Zadar	8	(2)
2015	Metalist Kharkiv	10	(0)
2016	Bunyodkor	25	(0)
2017	Pakhtakor Tashkent	9	(0)
2017	BATE Borisov	4	(0)
2018	Lokomotiv Plovdiv	7	(0)
2019	Inter Zaprešić	7	(0)
2020	Hetten	0	(0)
2021–2022	HNK Zadar		
2022–2023	NK Novalja		

International career
2004	Croatia U18	2	(0)
2004–2005	Croatia U19	7	(0)
2006	Croatia U20	2	(0)
2006	Croatia U21	1	(0)
2010	Croatia	2	(0)
- * Club domestic league appearances and goals

Jurica Buljat (born 12 September 1986) is a Croatian former professional footballer who played as a defender.

== Club career ==
On 20 June 2011, Buljat signed a three-year contract with Israeli defending champion Maccabi Haifa.

Buljat made his debut on 2011–12 UEFA Champions League second qualifying round, 13 July 2011, against Borac Banja Luka. He was released from the Israeli club after one year.

Buljat signed for Ukrainian side FC Metalist Kharkiv in February, 2015. At Metalist, Buljat made 11 appearances. He was released at the end of the season.

On 13 January 2017, Buljat signed for Uzbekistani club Pakhtakor Tashkent for the 2017 season after having featured 25 times for Bunyodkor of the same country. On 20 July 2017, he moved to FC BATE Borisov of Belarus.

On 14 March 2018, Buljat signed a short-term contract with Bulgarian First League side Lokomotiv Plovdiv. He left the club at the end of the 2017–18 season.

== International career ==
He made his debut for Croatia in a May 2010 friendly match away against Estonia, coming on as a late substitute for Milan Badelj, and earned a total of 2 caps, scoring no goals. His second and final international was an October 2010 friendly against Norway.

== Career statistics ==
=== Club ===
As of match played 26 November 2016

Club	Season	League			National Cup		League Cup		Continental		Other		Total	
Club	Season	Division	Apps	Goals	Apps	Goals	Apps	Goals	Apps	Goals	Apps	Goals	Apps	Goals
Zadar	2003–04	1. HNL	6	0			-		-		-		6	0
Zadar	2004–05	1. HNL	25	4			-		-		-		54	4
Zadar	Total		31	4			-	-	-	-	-	-	31	4
Hajduk Split	2005–06	1. HNL	3	0			-		0	0	-		3	0
Hajduk Split	2006–07	1. HNL	17	0			-		-		-		17	0
Hajduk Split	2007–08	1. HNL	21	0			-		-		-		21	0
Hajduk Split	2008–09	1. HNL	15	0			-		3	0	-		18	0
Hajduk Split	2009–10	1. HNL	17	0	4	0	-		-		-		21	0
Hajduk Split	2010–11	1. HNL	24	2	0	0	-		10	1	1	0	25	3
Hajduk Split	Total		97	2			-	-	13	1	1	0	111	3
Maccabi Haifa	2011–12	Ligat HaAl	31	0					9	1	-		40	1
Zadar	2012–13	1. HNL	9	1	0	0	–		-		–		9	1
Energie Cottbus	2013–14	2. Bundesliga	24	0	2	0	–		-		–		26	0
Zadar	2014–15	1. HNL	8	2	1	0	–		-		–		9	2
Metalist Kharkiv	2014–15	Ukrainian Premier League	10	0	1	0	–		-		–		11	0
Bunyodkor	2016	Uzbek League	25	0	6	0	–		6	0	-		37	0
Pakhtakor Tashkent	2017	Uzbek League	9	0	0	0	–		–		-		9	0
BATE Borisov	2017	Belarusian Premier League	2	0	0	0	–		4	-	6	0		
Career total			246	9	14	0			32	2	1	0	292	11

=== International ===
Croatia national team
Year	Apps	Goals
2010	2	0
Total	2	0

Statistics accurate as of match played 12 October 2010
