= NK Krivaja Zavidovići =

Krivaja Zavidovići
- Full name: Nogometni klub Krivaja Zavidovići
- Founded: 22 June 1919; 107 years ago
- Ground: Gradski Stadion
- Capacity: 2,000
- Chairman: Adnan Haćimić
- Manager: Goran Brašnić
- League: Second League of FBiH Center
- 2025–26: Second League of FBiH Center, 3rd
Home colours	Away colours

Nogometni klub Krivaja Zavidovići (English: Football Club Krivaja Zavidovići, short NK Krivaja) is a professional football club based in Zavidovići, Bosnia and Herzegovina that competes in the Second League of the Federation of Bosnia and Herzegovina.

== History ==
The club was founded in 1919 and thus became the first sports club in the town of Zavidovići. An urban legend states that the first club meeting was held in local resident Mamil Musafija's restaurant. In the pre-Second World War period from the early 1930s until the Axis invasion of the Kingdom of Yugoslavia, the club was considered among the best in Bosnia and Herzegovina. After the end of the Second World War the club was reestablished and took part in lower levels of the Yugoslav league system. After the independence of Bosnia and Herzegovina, Krivaja has competed in the second and third-tier.

Krivaja is a regular member in the Second league of Federation of Bosnia and Herzegovina (third-tier).

== See also ==
- Football in Bosnia and Herzegovina
- Football Federation of Bosnia and Herzegovina
