= Mario Tičinović =

Croatian footballer (born 1991)

Personal information
- Date of birth: 20 August 1991 (age 35)
- Place of birth: Sinj, Croatia
- Height: 1.72 m (5 ft 8 in)
- Positions: Full-back; winger

Team information
- Current team: Uskok Klis
- Number: 18

Youth career
- Junak Sinj
- 2004–2008: Hajduk Split

Senior career*
Years	Team	Apps	(Gls)
2008–2012	Hajduk Split	50	(4)
2010–2011	→ Karlovac (loan)	7	(1)
2012	→ FC Nordsjælland (loan)	11	(1)
2012–2015	FC Nordsjælland	85	(4)
2015–2019	Lokeren	76	(1)
2018	→ Hajduk Split (loan)	7	(0)
2019–2025	Zrinjski Mostar	115	(11)
2025–2026	Vukovar 1991	26	(0)
2026–	Uskok Klis	0	(0)

International career
2005	Croatia U14	1	(0)
2007	Croatia U16	8	(0)
2007–2008	Croatia U17	9	(0)
2008–2010	Croatia U19	13	(2)
2008–2011	Croatia U20	7	(1)
2009–2012	Croatia U21	10	(0)
- * Club domestic league appearances and goals as of 8 August 2026

Mario Tičinović (born 20 August 1991) is a Croatian professional footballer who plays as a winger for 2. NL club Uskok Klis.

He has amassed a total 44 youth caps for Croatia under six different age groups.

== Club career ==
=== Hajduk Split ===
Tičinović began his playing career at Hajduk Split, he didn't graduate from all the youth levels of Hajduk. That decision would later affect his career. His first game for Hajduk was on 3 August 2008 against Varteks, he came on for Mladen Bartolović which made him at that time the youngest player ever that debuted for Hajduk on senior level with only 16 years of age. The game ended in a one all draw. Tičinović scored his first goal for the team in a 4–0 win over Birkirkara, becoming the youngest Hajduk's scorer in European competitions ever. Tičinović was often hailed by the media as the new Croatian star and was expected to make a significant international career. Despite his talent he did manage to find himself in the starting 11 and was mostly used as a substitute which affected him negatively.

In 2008, he suffered an injury which kept him of the field for nearly 1 year. In 2009 under manager Edoardo Reja he was used more often in the first team but after suffering another injury during the winter preparations in Marbella he paused for 2 months and after Reja left the club Tičinović found himself again on the bench. He won the Croatian Cup in 2010. In the following season he joined Karlovac on loan but after 6 months he returned to Hajduk again to find himself with minor minutes on the field.

In 2011, manager Krasimir Balakov came to Hajduk and started using young Tičinović as a left back. He did not prove himself to the new manager and was used again as a late substitute. In November 2011 Tičinović was kicked from the first team for breaking the door in the club restaurant and for disrespecting manager Balakov. He was given the status as a not needed player and was loaned to F.C. Nordsjælland. Finally he was sold to them at the end of the season.

=== Nordsjælland ===
In January 2012, Tičinović was loaned to Danish club Nordsjælland for the rest of the season. He would make 11 appearances and score 1 goal during his loan spell, helping the Farum club win their first Danish Superliga championship.

On 1 June 2012, Nordsjælland confirmed the purchase of Tičinović from Hajduk Split who signed a three-year contract.

=== Lokeren ===
On 9 July 2015, it was confirmed that Tičinović had signed a four-year contract with Belgian club Lokeren.

On 31 January 2019, it was announced, that Tičinović, Julian Michel and Đorđe Jovanović had been promoted to reserve team due to a lack of commitment. The club was in a very bad position, which with 7 matches to go was very close to relegation. On 4 March 2019, Tičinović got his contract terminated by mutual consent.

=== Zrinjski Mostar ===
On 5 July 2019, Tičinović signed with Bosnian Premier League club Zrinjski Mostar on a free transfer. He made his official debut for Zrinjski on 25 July 2019, in a 1–1 away draw against Utrecht in the 2019–20 UEFA Europa League second qualifying round.

== Honours ==
Hajduk Split

- Croatian Cup: 2009–10

Nordsjælland

- Danish Superliga: 2011–12

Zrinjski Mostar

- Bosnian Premier League: 2021–22, 2022–23
- Bosnian Cup: 2022–23, 2023–24
