= Drago Gabrić =

Croatian footballer (born 1986)

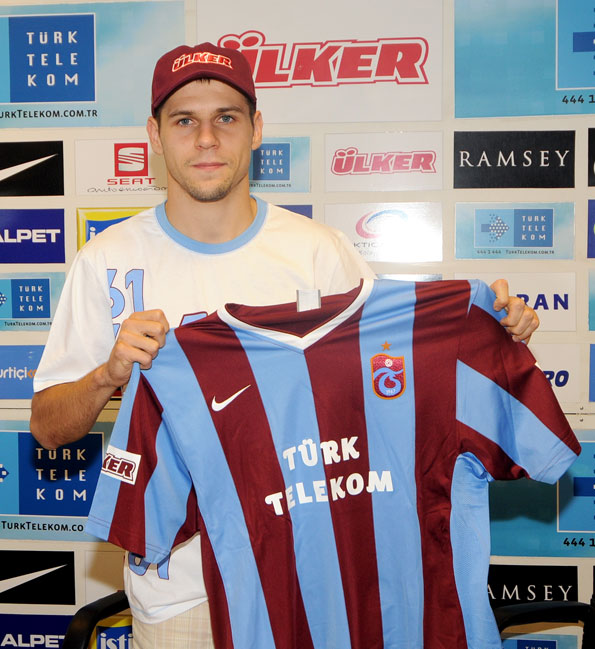
- Gabrić with Trabzonspor in 2009

Personal information
- Date of birth: 27 September 1986 (age 40)
- Place of birth: Split, SR Croatia, Yugoslavia
- Height: 1.76 m (5 ft 9 in)
- Positions: Midfielder; winger

Team information
- Current team: Zagora Unešić
- Number: 77

Youth career
- Orkan Dugi Rat
- 1996–2005: Hajduk Split
- 2003–2004: → Omiš (loan)

Senior career*
Years	Team	Apps	(Gls)
2004–2009	Hajduk Split	70	(13)
2005	→ Solin (loan)	16	(3)
2006	→ Novalja (loan)	9	(1)
2009–2011	Trabzonspor	25	(4)
2010–2011	→ MKE Ankaragücü (loan)	22	(4)
2011–2012	Hajduk Split	10	(1)
2012–2015	Rijeka	12	(0)
2013–2014	→ Domžale (loan)	14	(1)
2015	→ Zadar (loan)	13	(2)
2016	Koper	5	(0)
2017	Junak Sinj	23	(7)
2018–2019	RNK Split	43	(31)
2019–	Zagora Unešić		

International career
2007	Croatia U20	3	(0)
2007–2008	Croatia U21	6	(0)
2009–2010	Croatia	5	(1)
- * Club domestic league appearances and goals

Drago Gabrić (born 27 September 1986) is a Croatian professional footballer who plays as a midfielder for Croatian side Zagora Unešić. He also plays futsal.

He is a versatile player, able to play on both sides of the field. His father, Tonči, was a former Hajduk Split and Rijeka player, and a Croatian international goalkeeper.

== Club career ==
=== Hajduk Split ===
Gabrić made his 1. HNL debut on 16 September 2006 in a home match against Varteks, replacing double goalscorer Josip Balatinac in the 80th minute. Varteks again proved to be a favoured opponent for Gabrić, with his first Hajduk goal coming against the same side on 17 March 2007. He scored two further goals by the end of that season, one against Međimurje and the other against Zagreb.

When Robert Jarni was appointed as head manager of Hajduk, Gabrić became a more prominent member of the first team, managing 23 appearances in the 2007–08 season. His side struggled, though, as they finished in fifth place in the league, 30 points behind league champions and fierce rivals Dinamo Zagreb. Under Jarni, Gabrić played in a variety of positions al across the midfield and even occasionally in defence.

After Jarni resigned, Gabrić blossomed under the management of both Goran Vučević and Ante Miše, with both managers using Gabrić in a more advanced role either as a right or left winger or even as a number 10 behind the striker. This improved his scoring return, with the player netting eight times in 30 league games in the 2008–09 season. In December 2008, Gabrić signed a new three-and-a-half-year deal with the club worth a rumoured amount of €180,000 annually. He also received the Heart of Hajduk Award as a result of his performances in the 2007–08 season.

=== Trabzonspor ===
In August 2009, Gabrić was signed by Turkish giants Trabzonspor in a €2.5m deal. He made 28 appearances in his maiden year in Turkey, scoring four times but largely struggled to impress and was therefore sent out on loan to MKE Ankaragücü for the 2010–11 season. At Ankaragücü, Gabrić made 26 appearances and again scored four league goals.

On 23 June 2011, Gabrić was seriously injured in an accident after losing control of his car on the A1 motorway near Split, Croatia. He sustained a fractured skull and was in a coma for four days. His club at the time, Trabzonspor, terminated his contract. After the accident, Gabrić was initially unable to walk, and had to undergo extensive rehabilitation in order to regain his motor skills. He filed a suit against Trabzonspor for breach of contract, which ended in settlement in 2014.

=== Return to Hajduk Split ===
In September 2011, Gabrić signed for Hajduk Split. He made his return to football on 5 November 2011, in a round 14 1. HNL clash against NK Varaždin, the side he made his debut against and scored his first professional league goal against. He made another nine appearances that season but largely disappointed.

=== Rijeka ===
In June 2012, Gabrić moved from Hajduk to Rijeka on a free transfer, following his father's footsteps, who made the same move. At Rijeka, Drago again struggled to impress and was dropped from the squad for the last 14 matches of the season. He moved on loan to Slovenian side NK Domžale for the 2013–14 season, but once again having a poor season, scoring once in 14 games and hardly playing a part in the side's second half of the season.

Upon his return to Rijeka and with one year still left on his contract, Rijeka manager Matjaž Kek dropped the player from the squad completely and so Drago was forced to play with teammate in a similar situation Mehmed Alispahić in Rijeka's second team – playing in Croatia's third division.

Later on, Gabrić continued his career in Zadar where he played under the tutelage of former Croatia national football team manager Igor Štimac.

== International career ==
Gabrić made his debut for Croatia in a November 2009 friendly match against Liechtenstein and earned a total of five caps, scoring one goal. His final international was a May 2010 friendly away against Estonia.

== Career statistics ==
=== Club ===
Appearances and goals by club, season and competition
Club	Season	League			National cup		Continental		Total	
Club	Season	Division	Apps	Goals	Apps	Goals	Apps	Goals	Apps	Goals
Hajduk Split	2006–07	Prva HNL	16	3	4	0	1	0	21	3
Hajduk Split	2007–08	Prva HNL	23	2	4	0	4	0	31	2
Hajduk Split	2008–09	Prva HNL	29	8	7	1	2	0	38	9
Trabzonspor	2009–10	Süper Lig	25	4	–	–	–	–	25	4
MKE Ankaragücü (loan)	2010–11	Süper Lig	22	4	4	0	–	–	26	4
Hajduk Split	2011–12	Prva HNL	10	1	2	0	–	–	12	1
Rijeka	2012–13	Prva HNL	12	0	–	–	–	–	12	0
Domžale (loan)	2013–14	PrvaLiga	14	1	1	0	2	0	17	1
Zadar (loan)	2014–15	Prva HNL	13	2	1	–	–	–	14	2
Total			154	25	23	1	9	0	186	26

=== International ===
Goal	Date	Venue	Opponent	Score	Result	Competition
1.	23 May 2010	Gradski vrt, Osijek, Croatia	Wales	2–0	2–0	Friendly

== Honours ==
Trabzonspor

- Turkish Cup: 2009–10
