= Đovani Roso =

Croatian footballer (born 1972)

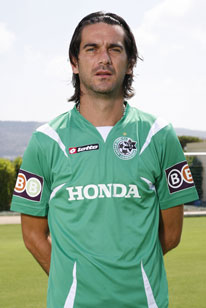
- Roso with Maccabi Haifa

Personal information
- Full name: Đovani Roso
- Date of birth: 17 November 1972 (age 53)
- Place of birth: Split, SR Croatia, Yugoslavia
- Height: 1.87 m (6 ft 2 in)
- Position: Attacking midfielder

Senior career*
Years	Team	Apps	(Gls)
1992–1993	Zadar	30	(9)
1993–1996	NK Zagreb	64	(11)
1996–1997	Hapoel Be'er Sheva	34	(6)
1997–2000	Hapoel Haifa	89	(26)
2000–2001	Beitar Jerusalem	33	(6)
2001–2005	Maccabi Haifa	101	(23)
2005–2007	Maccabi Tel Aviv	52	(5)
2007–2008	Maccabi Haifa	28	(3)
2008–2009	Hajduk Split	4	(0)
Total		435	(89)

International career
2002–2004	Croatia	19	(1)
- * Club domestic league appearances and goals

Đovani Roso (Italian: Giovanni Rosso; born 17 November 1972) is a Croatian former professional footballer who played as an attacking midfielder. Aside from his native Croatia, Roso notably played for a number of renowned Israeli clubs, where he became noted for his technique and free kicks.

== Club career ==
Roso played for NK Zagreb between 1994 and 1996 before moving to Israel. Roso enjoyed great success in the decade. He played for top teams in Israel, including a campaign in the UEFA Champions League with Maccabi Haifa. He has been acknowledged as being among the very best foreign players to ever play in the Israeli Premier League.

His return to Hajduk Split was ruined by injuries. He only ended up playing four games in the Croatian first league during this stretch. He retired from club football in June 2009.

== International career ==
He made his debut for Croatia in a November 2002 friendly match away against Romania and earned a total of 19 caps, scoring one goal. His final international was a June 2004 European Championship game against England in Lisbon.

== Post-playing career ==
Roso appeared as the Pit Stop greeter during Leg 3 of HaMerotz LaMillion 2 ("The Amazing Race: Israel"), which took place in Dubrovnik, Croatia.

In 2015, he participated in the reality TV series "Goalstar". In 2019, he participated in and won the reality TV series "Survivor VIP" that was broadcast on Channel 13 in Israel.

== Personal life ==
Roso speaks fluent Hebrew and is a naturalized Israeli citizen.

== Honours ==
Hapoel Be'er Sheva

- Israel State Cup: 1997

Hapoel Haifa

- Israeli Championships: 1998–99

Maccabi Haifa

- Israeli Championships: 2001–02, 2003–04, 2004–05
- Toto Cup: 2001–02

Individual

- Israeli Footballer of the Year: 1998–99, 2001–02
