= Srđan Andrić =

Croatian footballer

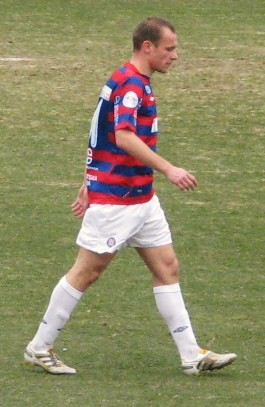
- Andrić with Hajduk Split in 2010

Personal information
- Date of birth: 5 January 1980 (age 46)
- Place of birth: Dubrovnik, SR Croatia, Yugoslavia
- Height: 1.83 m (6 ft 0 in)
- Positions: Defensive midfielder; centre-back

Youth career
- HNK Dubrovnik
- Hajduk Split

Senior career*
Years	Team	Apps	(Gls)
1999–2004	Hajduk Split	103	(10)
2004–2007	Panathinaikos	25	(2)
2007–2012	Hajduk Split	97	(16)
2012–2013	Al-Wahda	6	(1)
Total		231	(29)

International career
1998–1999	Croatia U19	7	(1)
1999–2001	Croatia U21	11	(1)
2002–2003	Croatia	2	(1)
- * Club domestic league appearances and goals

Srđan Andrić (born 5 January 1980) is a Croatian former professional footballer who played as a defensive midfielder. He was most recently the youth academy director of Hajduk Split.

== Club career ==
Andrić started his career with Croatia's Hajduk Split. He made his debut for the club in the 1999–2000 Prva HNL aged 19 years old. He spent the next four seasons at Hajduk, becoming the captain for the 2003–04 season.

Andric then moved to Greek club, Panathinaikos in 2004 in a deal worth €150,000.

He was released from Panathinaikos upon the expiration of his contract in May 2007, before rejoining Hajduk. He quickly became club captain again after the departure of Mirko Hrgović.

After over 100 appearances and five years in his second stint at the Split based side, on 1 August 2012, he joined UAE Pro-League outfit Al-Wahda for the 2012–13 season. After a relatively unsuccessful season in the UAE, he retired from football in 2013.

In total, Andric made 266 appearances for Hajduk over his two stints.

== International career ==
He made his debut for Croatia in a March 2002 friendly match against Slovenia and has earned a total of 2 caps, scoring 1 goal. His final international was a February 2003 friendly draw with Macedonia in which game he scored the final goal of the game.

== Post-playing career ==
Hajduk announced that he had been appointed the chief of the youth academy on 19 March 2014, after a period out of the game. On 24 May 2016, he resigned as youth academy director after his contract was not renewed.

== Career statistics ==
Appearances and goals by club, season and competition
Club	Season	League		
Club	Season	Division	Apps	Goals
Hajduk Split	1999–00	Prva HNL	9	0
Hajduk Split	2000–01	Prva HNL	19	1
Hajduk Split	2001–02	Prva HNL	26	5
Hajduk Split	2002–03	Prva HNL	26	2
Hajduk Split	2003–04	Prva HNL	21	2
Panathinaikos	2004–05	Alpha Ethniki	10	0
Panathinaikos	2005–06	Alpha Ethniki	14	2
Panathinaikos	2006–07	Super League Greece	1	0
Hajduk Split	2007–08	Prva HNL	22	2
Hajduk Split	2008–09	Prva HNL	24	6
Hajduk Split	2009–10	Prva HNL	15	1
Hajduk Split	2010–11	Prva HNL	16	5
Hajduk Split	2011–12	Prva HNL	20	2
