= Mirko Hrgović =

Bosnian football manager (born 1979)

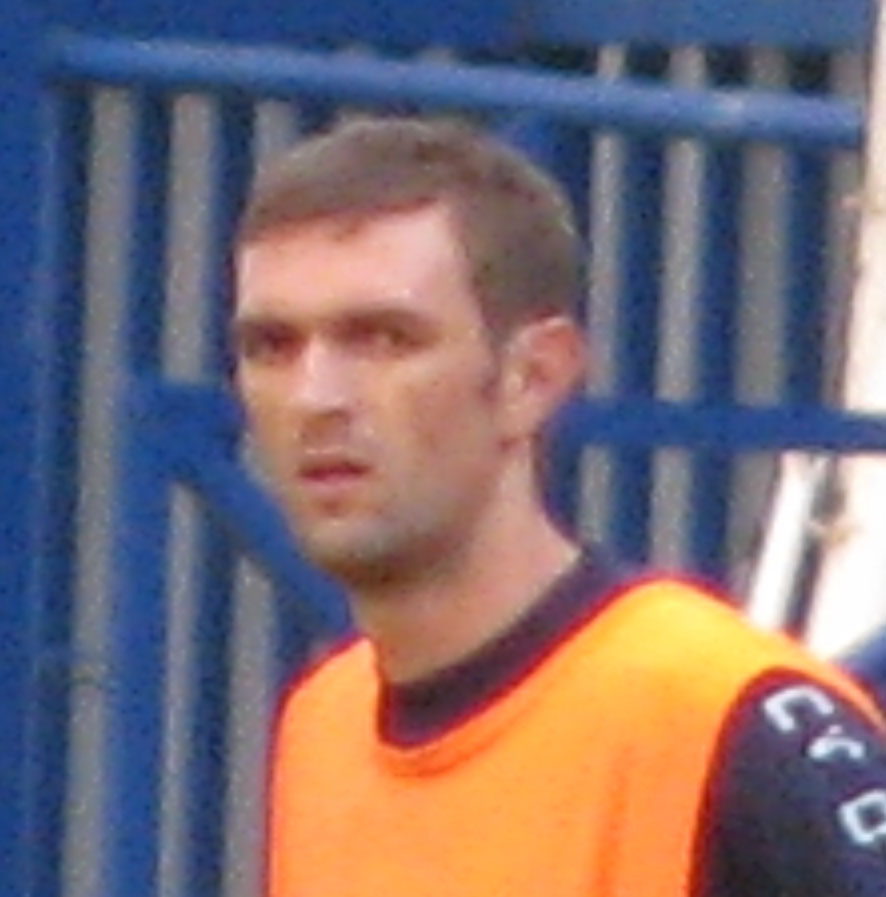
- Hrgović in 2008

Personal information
- Date of birth: 5 February 1979 (age 47)
- Place of birth: Sinj, SFR Yugoslavia
- Height: 1.86 m (6 ft 1 in)
- Position: Left winger

Team information
- Current team: Bosnia and Herzegovina (assistant)

Youth career
- Junak Sinj

Senior career*
Years	Team	Apps	(Gls)
1997–1999	Junak Sinj		
1999–2001	Hajduk Split	2	(0)
2000	→ Posušje (loan)		
2001	Gamba Osaka	4	(0)
2001–2003	Široki Brijeg	35	(15)
2003–2006	VfL Wolfsburg	23	(0)
2006–2008	Hajduk Split	63	(6)
2008	JEF United Chiba	7	(0)
2008–2009	Dinamo Zagreb	25	(2)
2009	Greuther Fürth	7	(0)
2010	Široki Brijeg	13	(0)
2010–2011	Kavala	23	(0)
2011–2013	RNK Split	39	(1)
2013–2015	Zadar	20	(2)

International career
2003–2009	Bosnia and Herzegovina	29	(2)

Managerial career
- 2017–2018: Široki Brijeg (assistant)
- 2018–2019: Sheriff Tiraspol (assistant)
- 2021–2022: Beijing Guoan (assistant)
- 2022–2023: Šibenik (assistant)
- 2024–: Bosnia and Herzegovina (assistant)
- * Club domestic league appearances and goals

Mirko Hrgović (born 5 February 1979) is a Bosnian professional football manager and former player currently working as an assistant coach for the Bosnia and Herzegovina national team.

== Club career ==
=== Široki Brijeg ===
Hrgović has played for Posušje and Široki Brijeg in the Bosnian Premier League, Gamba Osaka and JEF United Chiba in the Japanese J1 League, VfL Wolfsburg in the Bundesliga and rivals Hajduk Split and Dinamo Zagreb in the Croatian First League among others.

=== Dinamo Zagreb ===
On 18 July 2008, Hrgović signed a three-year contract with Dinamo Zagreb. His move, albeit not directly from Hajduk Split to Dinamo, stirred quite a controversy among both Hajduk and Dinamo fans. While Hajduk fans tend to see the move as treason to their beloved club, Dinamo fans cannot forgive the physical altercation between Hrgović and a couple of them that occurred seven months earlier during the national futsal competition. Graffiti against Hrgović and death threats, including a puppet of him being hanged by the Dinamo stadium fence, were registered.

=== Greuther Fürth ===
On 17 July 2009, Hrgović signed a two-year contract with 2. Bundesliga side Greuther Fürth. He was released on 25 November 2009.

=== Return to Široki Brijeg ===
After his release in November 2009 by Greuther Fürth, Hrgović returned to his former club Široki Brijeg in March 2010.

== International career ==
Born in Croatia, Hrgović decided to play for Bosnia and Herzegovina after his games went unnoticed in Croatia. He decided to take Bosnia and Herzegovina nationality while playing for Široki Brijeg. He was called up by national team head coach Blaž Slišković.

Hrgović made his debut for Bosnia and Herzegovina in a February 2003 friendly game away against Wales. He has earned a total of 29 caps, scoring 2 goals.

Hrgović played regularly during Blaž Slišković's time as the national team's head coach. After Slišković's resignation in 2006, he also played under Fuad Muzurović and Meho Kodro. When Miroslav Blažević became head coach, Hrgović was dropped for several games. He would eventually be called back to represent the country in the last two games of the 2010 FIFA World Cup qualifying campaign against Estonia and Spain. His final international was an October 2009 World Cup qualifying game against the latter.

== Managerial career ==
Following his retirement from active football, Hrgović became a manager. He worked as an assistant at Široki Brijeg, Sheriff Tiraspol, Beijing Guoan and Šibenik.

In May 2024, Hrgović was named as an assistant of newly appointed Bosnia and Herzegovina national team head coach Sergej Barbarez.

== Career statistics ==
=== International ===
Appearances and goals by national team and year
National team	Year	Apps	Goals
Bosnia and Herzegovina	2003	7	0
Bosnia and Herzegovina	2004	4	0
Bosnia and Herzegovina	2005	2	0
Bosnia and Herzegovina	2006	8	1
Bosnia and Herzegovina	2007	6	1
Bosnia and Herzegovina	2008	1	0
Bosnia and Herzegovina	2009	1	0
Total		29	2

Scores and results list Bosnia and Herzegovina's goal tally first

#	Date	Venue	Opponent	Score	Result	Competition
1.	2 September 2006	Ta' Qali Stadium, Ta' Qali	Malta	2–1	5–2	UEFA Euro 2008 qualifying
2.	13 October 2007	Olympic Stadium, Athens	Greece	1–1	2–3	UEFA Euro 2008 qualifying

== Honours ==
=== Player ===
Hajduk Split

- Croatian First League: 2000–01

Dinamo Zagreb

- Croatian First League: 2008–09
- Croatian Cup: 2008–09

Awards
Preceded by None	Heart of Hajduk Award; 2007	Succeeded by Drago Gabrić
