= NK Konavljanin =

Croatian football club

Konavljanin
- Full name: Hrvatski nogometni klub Konavljanin Čilipi
- Founded: 1947
- Ground: Šupjaka
- Capacity: 1,500
- Chairman: Ivan Pavlović
- Manager: Mateo Kristić
- League: 3. HNL – South
Home colours	Away colours

HNK Konavljanin is a Croatian professional football club based in Čilipi.

== Honours ==
(Croatia) 3. HNL – South:

- Winners (1): 2004–05

(Croatia) 1. ŽNL:

- Winners (1): 2025–26
