= Ivan Strinić =

Croatian footballer (born 1987)

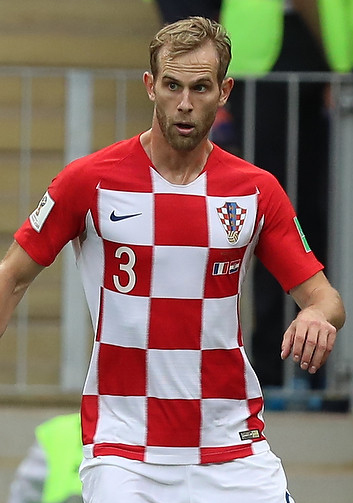
- Strinić playing for Croatia in the 2018 FIFA World Cup final

Personal information
- Full name: Ivan Strinić
- Date of birth: 17 July 1987 (age 39)
- Place of birth: Split, SR Croatia, Yugoslavia
- Height: 1.86 m (6 ft 1 in)
- Position: Left-back

Youth career
- Hajduk Split

Senior career*
Years	Team	Apps	(Gls)
2006–2007	Le Mans B	11	(0)
2007–2008	Hrvatski Dragovoljac	22	(1)
2008–2011	Hajduk Split	51	(4)
2011–2015	Dnipro Dnipropetrovsk	85	(4)
2015–2017	Napoli	26	(0)
2017–2018	Sampdoria	17	(0)
2018–2019	AC Milan	0	(0)
Total		212	(9)

International career
2002	Croatia U15	1	(0)
2002–2003	Croatia U16	9	(0)
2003	Croatia U17	8	(0)
2004	Croatia U18	2	(1)
2005–2006	Croatia U19	10	(0)
2008	Croatia U21	2	(0)
2010–2018	Croatia	49	(0)
Medal record
Men's football
Representing Croatia
FIFA World Cup
Runner-up	2018 Russia
- * Club domestic league appearances and goals

Ivan Strinić (Croatian pronunciation: [ǐʋan strǐːnitɕ]; born 17 July 1987) is a Croatian former professional footballer who played as a left-back. Strinić spent his professional career playing in a number of clubs from Croatian, Ukrainian and Italian top flight, including Hajduk Split, Napoli and Dnipro Dnipropetrovsk.

== Club career ==
=== Early career ===
Born in Split, Strinić started his youth career with Hajduk Split, where he stayed until 2006, then he moved to France to play for Le Mans B. Following his return to Croatia he played for NK Hrvatski Dragovoljac where he was spotted by his native club Hajduk Split.

=== Hajduk Split ===
Even though he was close to finishing a deal with Dinamo Zagreb, Strinić decided to sign for his youth club Hajduk Split. His first competitive match for Hajduk came on the opening of the 2008–09 season against NK Zadar on Poljud Stadium, ending in 1–0 win for Hajduk. During his first season with Hajduk he appeared in 17 domestic league games, playing in the position of left-back.

In the 2009–10 season he proved himself as the first team regular starter, earning his first call-up for national team as well. He managed to score four goals in the league, including one in the eternal derby against Dinamo Zagreb in a 2–1 win.

In the 2010–11 season, Strinić played in all of Hajduk's matches in 2010–11 UEFA Europa League campaign against RSC Anderlecht, AEK and Zenit St. Petersburg. He also became the starting left-back in the national side, playing in eight out of nine qualifiers for Euro 2012.

He left Hajduk in January 2011 after amassing 77 appearances in all competitions for the Split-based side, scoring five goals.

=== FC Dnipro Dnipropetrovsk ===
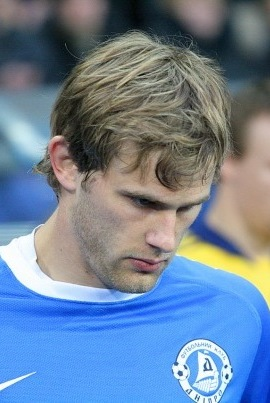
Strinić playing for Dnipro Dnipropetrovsk in 2011

On 27 January 2011, Strinić signed with Dnipro Dnipropetrovsk for reported fee of 4 million euro. Strinić made his debut for Dnipro in a league match against Tavriya Simferopol in a 2–2 draw with the left back scoring a stunning goal. He made five other appearances that season in a slow start to his Dnipro career.

The 2011–12 season was far better for Strinić as he made 27 appearances in all competitions and played all three games in Croatia's Euro 2012 campaign.

The 2012–13 season was similarly successful for Strinić as he maintained his starting places with both the national side and his club side, amassing 35 appearances for Dnipro in all competitions.

In December 2014, Strinić announced that he would not be renewing his contract with the club with his contract expiring at the end of that month.

=== Napoli ===
The player subsequently signed with S.S.C. Napoli, after 112 games over four years with the Italian club.

=== Sampdoria ===
On 31 August 2017, Strinić joined Sampdoria for a reported fee of €2 million, signing a one-year deal.

=== AC Milan ===
In March 2018, Strinić signed a pre-contract with AC Milan. The deal was officialized on 2 July 2018 while he was in Russia playing for the national team at the World Cup. On 18 August 2018, a heart condition which was found meant the temporary withdrawal from football training sessions. He became available again for selection into matchday squads since 12 January 2019 and was on the team's bench 10 times before the end of season. In July 2019, he made his unofficial debut for Milan, starting in a friendly against Bayern Munich as a center back. On 26 August 2019, Strinić and the club's management mutually agreed to the terms of contract termination, ending the deal two years in advance.

== International career ==
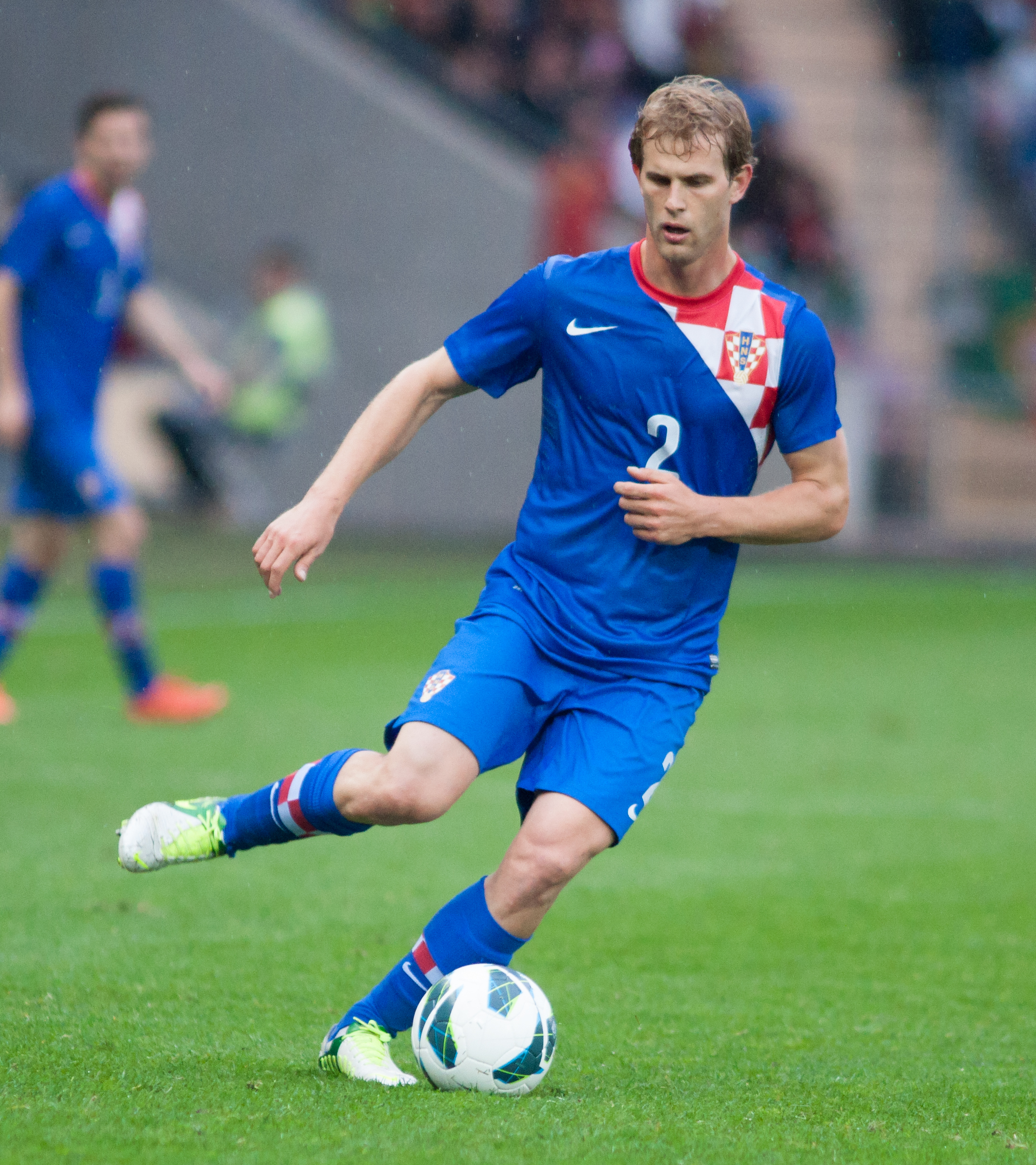
Strinić playing for Croatia in 2013

Strinić received his first call-up for the Croatia senior team under manager Slaven Bilić for a friendly match against Austria on 19 May 2010. He went on to be a regular starter for Croatia and the first choice for their left-back position. He was a part of the Croatia squad for UEFA Euro 2012 in Poland and Ukraine, where he played in all three of the side's group stage games. He provided an assist for Mario Mandžukić in the match against Italy, to equalize the result at 1–1. Although he was the first choice left-back during the qualification matches, Strinić missed out on the 2014 World Cup finals in Brazil due to a hamstring injury.

In May 2018, Strinić was named in Croatia's squad for the 2018 World Cup in Russia. He started in six of the seven matches in the team's runner-up finish, including the final. However, due to a diagnosed heart condition, Strinić was forced to withdraw from football. When he recovered, he was out of shape and has never been called up again. He earned a total of 49 caps, scoring no goals.

== Career statistics ==
=== International ===
Appearances and goals by national team and year
National team	Year	Apps	Goals
Croatia	2010	7	0
Croatia	2011	8	0
Croatia	2012	10	0
Croatia	2013	7	0
Croatia	2014	1	0
Croatia	2015	0	0
Croatia	2016	6	0
Croatia	2017	2	0
Croatia	2018	8	0
Total		49	0

== Honours ==
Hajduk Split

- Croatian Cup: 2009–10

Croatia

- FIFA World Cup runner-up: 2018

Orders

- Order of Duke Branimir: 2018
