= Boris Pandža =

Bosnian footballer (born 1986)

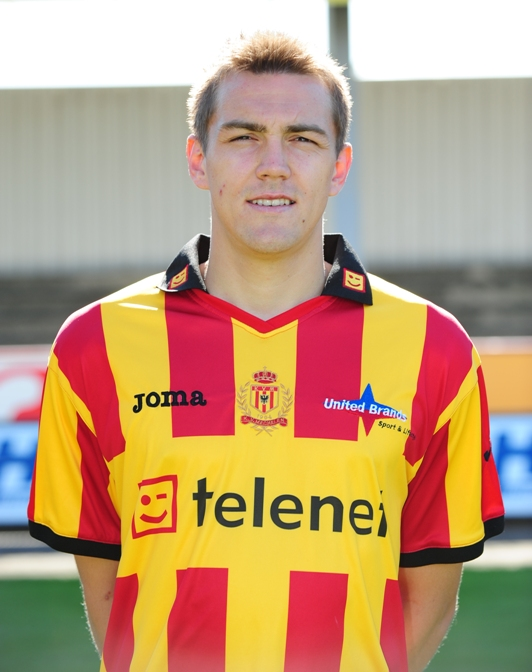
- Pandža with Mechelen in 2010

Personal information
- Date of birth: 15 December 1986 (age 39)
- Place of birth: Mostar, SFR Yugoslavia
- Height: 1.86 m (6 ft 1 in)
- Position: Defender

Team information
- Current team: Široki Brijeg (assistant)

Youth career
- Zrinjski Mostar

Senior career*
Years	Team	Apps	(Gls)
2004–2006	Široki Brijeg	23	(2)
2006–2010	Hajduk Split	61	(2)
2010–2013	Mechelen	68	(5)
2013–2014	Górnik Zabrze	11	(0)
2014–2017	Široki Brijeg	43	(5)
2018	Čelik Zenica	13	(0)
2018–2021	Šibenik	47	(2)
Total		266	(16)

International career
2006–2008	Bosnia and Herzegovina U21	13	(0)
2007–2014	Bosnia and Herzegovina	21	(0)

Managerial career
- 2024: Široki Brijeg (caretaker)
- 2024: Široki Brijeg (caretaker)
- 2024–2026: Široki Brijeg (assistant)
- * Club domestic league appearances and goals

Boris Pandža (born 15 December 1986) is a Bosnian football manager and former player.

== Club career ==
=== Early career ===
Pandža, who played solely in defense, started his youth career at hometown club Zrinjski Mostar before moving to Široki Brijeg, where he started his professional career.

=== Hajduk Split ===
After two-years at Široki Brijeg, Pandža joined Croatian First League club Hajduk Split in January 2006, but the move was completed in late-2006 and the fee was worth about €200,000 on a four-and-a-half-year contract. After spending two season limited in the first team, he started to be used more regularly under the management of Ante Miše.

On 17 May 2009, Pandža scored his first goal for the club, in a 2–0 victory against Šibenik. After an impressive display at the club, he attracted interests from Premier League side Stoke City. Upon his departure from Hajduk, Pandža said he wasn't sorry for leaving the club.

=== Mechelen ===
In July 2010, Pandža joined Belgian side Mechelen as a replacement for Jonas Ivens on a three-year contract, with a €350,000 transfer fee. He made his debut for the opening game of the season, in a 2–0 win over Lokeren on 31 July 2010 and then scored his first goal for the club, in a 2–1 win over Zulte Waregem one week after his debut. He then scored his second goal, in a 1–0 win over Standard Liège on 17 September 2010 and a third goal came on 1 October 2010, in a 2–2 draw against Genk. In his first full season at the club, Pandža scored four goals in thirty-seven appearances in all competitions. His second season was more enjoyable, scoring the club's first goal of the season, as they beat Sint-Truidense 2–1 on 30 July 2011. He then scored another on 25 January 2012, in a 3–2 win over Genk.

In his second season at the club, Pandža scored two goals in thirty-one appearances in all competitions. His last season with the club saw him stay at the club after his scheduled move to Arsenal Kyiv collapsed following a failure to meet Pandža's requirements. However, it went appalling for Pandža when he sustained a knee injury, in a 2–0 loss against Beerschot on 1 September 2012 and was out for four weeks. However, it was announced furthermore that he was to be out for 6 months with an injury that could miss the rest of the season. His knee surgery was a success. After three years at the club, Pandža left the club upon after his contract expired. Upon leaving Mechelen, he expressed "disappointment" for leaving the club.

In July 2013, Pandža was linked with a move to Scottish League One side Rangers. He then began talks with the club over possibly joining Rangers. He himself pleaded to Rangers, quoting: "come and get him" and even willing to risk his wages. Despite the expected agreement which lasted for two months, the move appeared to be stalled. The move was stalled, which was believed to put on hold by the club's chief executive Craig Mather and Pandža would later accuse the club of lacking professionalism for shattering his move to Rangers.

=== Górnik Zabrze ===
Despite a shattered move to Rangers, Pandža joined Polish side Górnik Zabrze on a one-year contract with an option to extend it. However, after making only thirteen appearances in all competitions, he was released by the club after one season.

=== Later stage of career ===
Pandža then returned to Široki Brijeg for the 2014–15 season, making 17 appearances as the club finished in 4th place. The following season, he managed just 9 league appearances. After Široki Brijeg, he also played at Čelik Zenica and Croatian club Šibenik. He finished his career at the end of the 2020–21 season at Šibenik.

== International career ==
Pandža was part of the Bosnia and Herzegovina U21 national team together with players like Edin Džeko, Vedad Ibišević and Sejad Salihović. He captained the team on a few occasions. He received his first senior call up for a game against Norway on 18 March 2007. He made his international debut on 2 June 2007 against Turkey in a 3–2 win. He then became a regular member of the squad.

In May 2014, Pandža was left out of the final squad for the 2014 FIFA World Cup. On 5 September 2014, he announced his retirement from the Bosnia and Herzegovina national team.

== Managerial career ==
On 12 May 2024, Pandža was appointed as Široki Brijeg's caretaker manager for the remainder of the 2023–24 Bosnian Premier League season.

== Managerial statistics ==
As of match played 8 December 2024

Managerial record by team and tenure
Team	From	To	Record							
Team	From	To	G	W	D	L	GF	GA	GD	Win %
Široki Brijeg (caretaker)	12 May 2024	3 June 2024	2	1	1	0	5	4	+1	50.00
Široki Brijeg (caretaker)	27 November 2024	20 December 2024	3	2	0	1	6	3	+3	66.67
Total			5	3	1	1	11	7	+4	60.00

== Honours ==
=== Player ===
Široki Brijeg

- Bosnian Premier League: 2005–06
- Bosnian Cup: 2016–17

Hajduk Split

- Croatian Cup: 2009–10

Šibenik

- Croatian Second League: 2019–20
