= NK Zagora Unešić =

Croatian football club

Zagora Unešić
- Full name: Nogometni klub Zagora Unešić
- Nickname: Crveni (The Reds)
- Founded: 1948
- Ground: Borovište, Unešić
- Capacity: 2,500
- Chairman: Mario Paić
- Manager: Boris Pavić
- League: Druga NL
- 2025–26: Treća NL South, 1st (promoted)
Home colours	Away colours

Nogometni klub Zagora Unešić (English: Football Club Zagora Unešić), commonly referred to as NK Zagora Unešić or simply Zagora Unešić, is a Croatian professional football club based in Unešić. They currently play in the Second Football League. The club has 400 members, in spite of being from a village of only 1500 people.

== History ==
NK Zagora was founded in 1948.

One of the club's most significant moments came in its cup runs in 2007–08. Zagora won the 2007 County Cup, in which scorer Ivo Šupe was given a lamb for his efforts. The county cup qualified them for the national cup, where Zagora made a run to the quarterfinal. Šupe, a postman, would score twice in Zagora's 7–2 two-legged quarterfinal loss against Dinamo Zagreb. Šupe would clarify that Zagora "did not play for lambs."

== Honours ==
Croatian football league system

- Treća NL (2): 2022–23, 2025–26
- 1. ŽNL (2): 2003–04, 2016–17
- County Cup (10): 1995–96, 1997–98, 2006–07, 2007–08, 2009–10, 2012–13, 2014–15, 2015–16, 2016–17

== Squad (2023) ==
Note: Flags indicate national team as defined under FIFA eligibility rules; some limited exceptions apply. Players may hold more than one non-FIFA nationality.

No.	Pos.	Nation	Player
1	GK	CRO	Gabriel Mihael Sablić
2	DF	CRO	Josip Mijić
4	MF	CRO	Bruno Šupe
6	DF	CRO	Jakov Arambašić
7	FW	CRO	Roko Bulat
8	MF	CRO	Antonio Blažević
10	MF	CRO	Toni Ivanišević
14	MF	CRO	Josip Zeljković
17		CRO	Bepo Božić
20	MF	CRO	Ante Arambašić
21	MF	CRO	Tomislav Dadić

No.	Pos.	Nation	Player
22	MF	CRO	Toni Vidović
23		CRO	David Bačić-Cvrlje
30	DF	CRO	Luka Klisović
33	DF	CRO	Mate Mrčela
44	GK	CRO	Domagoj Lukač
55	DF	CRO	Mario Mornar
77	FW	CRO	Drago Gabrić
81	MF	CRO	Ivan-Nikola Rodić
88	MF	CRO	Luka Božić
92	FW	CRO	Dino Barada
99	FW	CRO	Ivan Krajina
