= Mladen Bartolović =

Bosnian footballer (1977–2026)

Personal information
- Date of birth: 10 April 1977
- Place of birth: Zavidovići, SR Bosnia and Herzegovina, SFR Yugoslavia
- Date of death: 19 January 2026 (aged 48)
- Height: 1.69 m (5 ft 7 in)
- Position: Winger

Youth career
- Krivaja

Senior career*
Years	Team	Apps	(Gls)
1996–1998	Segesta		
1998–2003	Cibalia	98	(24)
2000–2001	→ 1. FC Saarbrücken (loan)	33	(6)
2003–2004	Dinamo Zagreb	24	(4)
2004–2006	NK Zagreb	47	(12)
2006–2009	Hajduk Split	70	(14)
2009–2010	Foolad	27	(1)
2010–2015	Cibalia	113	(25)

International career
2003–2008	Bosnia and Herzegovina	17	(1)

Managerial career
- 2015–2016: Cibalia (youth)
- 2016–2017: Bedem Ivankovo
- 2017–2018: Cibalia
- * Club domestic league appearances and goals

Mladen Bartolović (10 April 1977 – 19 January 2026) was a football coach and player from Bosnia and Herzegovina who spent a large part of his career in Croatia.

== Club career ==
Born in Zavidovići, Bartolović played basketball until the age of 16. However, as basketball came to a standstill during the Bosnian war, he turned to football. He began his professional career in 1996 at Segesta Sisak and moved to Croatian Football League club Cibalia Vinkovci two years later.

In the 2000–01 season, he was transferred to 1. FC Saarbrücken in the 2. Bundesliga for a season-long loan during which he scored six goals in 33 appearances for the club. He then returned to Cibalia. He played for Dinamo Zagreb in the 2003–04 season and won the 2003–04 Croatian Football Cup with the club. In the following two seasons, he played for city rivals NK Zagreb. From 2006 to 2009, he played for Hajduk Split.

He moved to Foolad Khuzestan in the summer of 2009 and secured a starting lineup spot within the team. After a season in the Iran Pro League, he returned to Cibalia where retired in 2015. In total, he scored 78 goals in 338 Croatian Football League matches.

== International career ==
Bartolović made his debut for Bosnia and Herzegovina in a June 2003 European Championship qualification match away against Romania. Between 2003 and 2008, he earned a total of 17 caps. His final international game was a November 2008 friendly match against Slovenia.

== Coaching career ==
After his playing career, Bartolović initially worked as a youth coach at Cibalia. Prior to the 2016–17 season, he was appointed the coach of third division club Bedem Ivankovo.

In March 2017, he became head coach of Cibalia Vinkovci's first team, taking over from Peter Pacult, who had previously been sacked after five games without a win. At the time Bartolović took over, Cibalia were threatened with relegation from the Croatian Football League, as they were in last place and seven points behind the relegation play-off spot. By the end of the 2016–17 season, the team had won eleven points under Bartolović and qualified for the relegation play-offs. The play-off matches against HNK Gorica were won 2:0 and 3:1 and Cibalia successfully avoided relegation.

He was sacked in March 2018, after a 5–1 defeat to HNK Rijeka, but continued to work for Cibalia Vinkovci as head scout and youth coordinator.

== Illness and death ==
In 2021, it was reported that Bartolović was fighting a serious illness. He died after a long illness on 19 January 2026, at the age of 48.

== Career statistics ==
=== Club ===
Appearances and goals by club, season and competition
Club	Season	League			National cup (Note: Includes DFB-Pokal,Hazfi Cup.)		Continental		Total	
Club	Season	Division	Apps	Goals	Apps	Goals	Apps	Goals	Apps	Goals
1. FC Saarbrücken	2000–01	2. Bundesliga	33	6	1	0	–		34	6
Foolad	2009–10	Persian Gulf Cup	27	1	1	0	–		28	1
Career total			60	7	2	0	0	0	62	7

=== International ===
Appearances and goals by national team and year
National team	Year	Apps	Goals
Bosnia and Herzegovina
Bosnia and Herzegovina	2003	1	0
Bosnia and Herzegovina	2005	5	0
Bosnia and Herzegovina	2006	8	1
Bosnia and Herzegovina	2007	2	0
Bosnia and Herzegovina	2008	1	0
Total		17	1

Scores and results list Bosnia and Herzegovina's goal tally first, score column indicates score after each Bartolović goal.

List of international goals scored by Mladen Bartolović
No.	Date	Venue	Cap	Opponent	Score	Result	Competition
1	2 September 2006	National Stadium, Ta' Qali, Malta	11	Malta	3–1	5–2	UEFA Euro 2008 qualifying
