= Senijad Ibričić =

Bosnian footballer (born 1985)

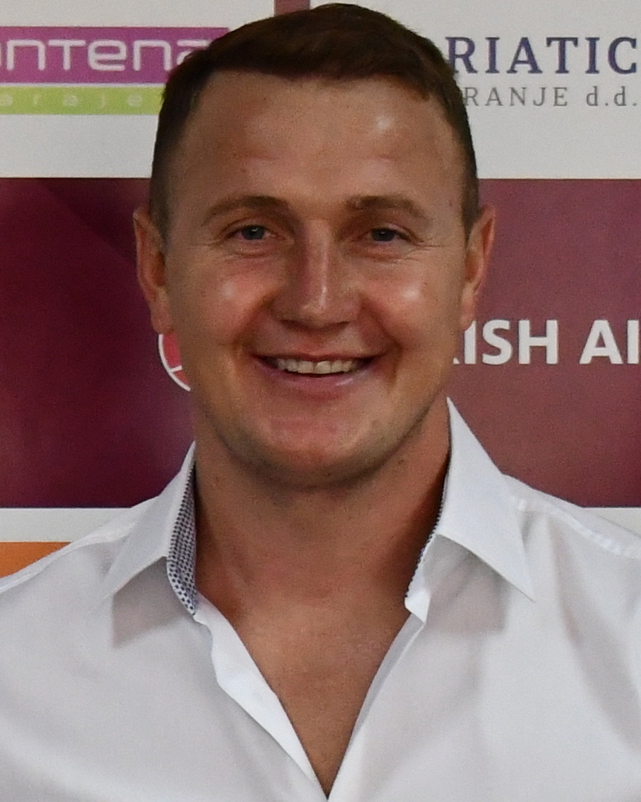
- Ibričić in 2023

Personal information
- Full name: Senijad Ibričić
- Date of birth: 26 September 1985 (age 41)
- Place of birth: Kotor Varoš, SFR Yugoslavia
- Height: 1.81 m (5 ft 11 in)
- Position: Attacking midfielder

Youth career
- –2003: Podgrmeč

Senior career*
Years	Team	Apps	(Gls)
2003–2004	Podgrmeč	23	(16)
2004–2008	Zagreb	100	(22)
2008–2011	Hajduk Split	76	(35)
2011–2013	Lokomotiv Moscow	28	(4)
2012	→ Gaziantepspor (loan)	13	(2)
2013	→ Kasımpaşa (loan)	14	(4)
2013–2015	Erciyesspor	30	(4)
2015	→ Vardar (loan)	13	(5)
2015	Karşıyaka	6	(0)
2016	Sepahan	5	(0)
2016–2017	Koper	29	(6)
2017–2022	Domžale	153	(40)

International career
2005–2007	Bosnia and Herzegovina U21	12	(8)
2005–2014	Bosnia and Herzegovina	44	(4)
- * Club domestic league appearances and goals

Senijad Ibričić (born 26 September 1985) is a Bosnian former professional footballer who played as an attacking midfielder.

Besides Bosnia and Herzegovina, Ibričić played in Croatia, Russia, Turkey, Macedonia, Iran, and Slovenia. He played for the Bosnia and Herzegovina national team for nine years, making 44 appearances and representing the country at the 2014 FIFA World Cup. Ibričić holds both Bosnian and Croatian citizenship.

== Club career ==
=== Zagreb ===
After one season at senior level in Bosnia and Herzegovina, Ibričić left to play for Croatian side NK Zagreb. He established himself as one of the club's best players, and soon attracted interest from bigger clubs in Croatia. He was transferred to Hajduk in 2008 for €1.8 million.

=== Hajduk Split ===
In April 2010 Ibričić scored against Dinamo Zagreb, Hajduk's biggest rivals, for the second time in his career. The goal sent Hajduk to the final of the Croatian Cup with a narrow 1–0 aggregate scoreline. He scored again in both the legs of the final and thereby won his first trophy for the club. He finished the 2009–10 season with 17 goals, only behind Davor Vugrinec in the Prva HNL. He was voted the best player in the Croatian League and received the Sportske novosti Yellow Shirt award for the 2009–10 season. This was the first time since 1992 that a Hajduk Split player got the prestigious award. He also won the 2009–10 fans' player of the year award, the Heart of Hajduk.

In late August 2010 he was linked with a possible move to Turkish side Galatasaray. According to media reports, Gaziantepspor offered €6.5 million to Hajduk, but the offer was turned down, with former Hajduk president Joško Svaguša saying that the minimum transfer fee for Ibričić would be in the region of €10 million.

=== Lokomotiv Moscow ===
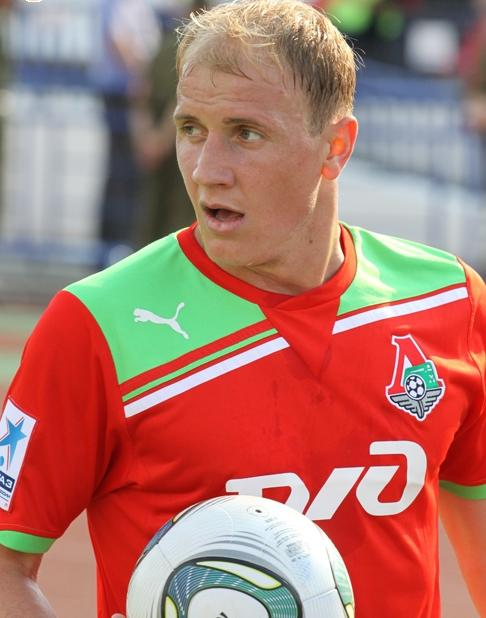
Ibričić playing for Lokomotiv Moscow in 2011

On 13 January 2011, he was transferred to Russian club FC Lokomotiv Moscow for a reported fee of around €7 million. Hajduk will also receive 20% of Ibričić's next transfer sum. He scored his first goal for Lokomotiv from the penalty spot in a league match against FC Krasnodar.

=== Gaziantepspor ===
On 31 July 2012, Ibričić moved on loan to Gaziantepspor. He scored twice in 13 Süper Lig games for this team.

=== Kasımpaşa ===
On 4 January 2013, Ibričić moved on loan to Kasımpaşa S.K.

=== Kayseri Erciyesspor ===
On 26 August 2013, Ibričić signed a three-year contract with Kayseri Erciyesspor.

=== Vardar ===
On 9 February 2015, Ibričić has moved to the Macedonian side Vardar. Later, on 15 March he was scored first goal from penalty, in his third game in the club against Turnovo.

=== Sepahan ===
Ibričić joined Persian Gulf League side Sepahan in January 2016. He made his debut in a 2–2 draw against Persepolis.

=== Koper ===
Ibričić joined Koper in Slovenia on 16 June 2016, signing a two-year contract.

== International career ==
Ibričić established himself in the national team of Bosnia and Herzegovina when his former coach at NK Zagreb, Miroslav Blažević became the national team's manager. He made his debut for Bosnia and Herzegovina in a February 2005 friendly match away against Iran and has earned a total of 44 caps, scoring four goals. He participated in each of Bosnia's 12 games in their 2010 FIFA World Cup qualifying campaign (ten in the regular qualification, and two playoff games). He scored his first goal for the national team in a friendly against Bulgaria. He also scored against Estonia in a record-breaking 7–0 victory in Zenica. His final international was a June 2014 pre-World Cup tournament friendly against Mexico. As of 21 July 2014, Ibričić has retired from international football for Bosnia and Herzegovina.

== Career statistics ==
=== International ===
Scores and results list Bosnia and Herzegovina's goal tally first, score column indicates score after each Ibričić goal.

List of international goals scored by Senijad Ibričić
No.	Date	Venue	Opponent	Score	Result	Competition
1	20 August 2008	Bilino Polje, Zenica, Bosnia and Herzegovina	Bulgaria	1–2	1–2	Friendly
2	10 September 2008	Bilino Polje, Zenica, Bosnia and Herzegovina	Estonia	7–0	7–0	2010 FIFA World Cup qualification
3	5 September 2009	Vazgen Sargsyan Republican Stadium, Yerevan, Armenia	Armenia	1–0	2–0	2010 FIFA World Cup qualification
4	3 September 2010	Stade Josy Barthel, Luxembourg City, Luxembourg	Luxembourg	1–0	3–0	UEFA Euro 2012 qualifying

== Honours ==
Hajduk Split

- Croatian Cup: 2009–10

Vardar

- Macedonian First League: 2014–15
