= 2011–12 Croatian First Football League =

MAXtv Prva Liga
- Season: 2011–12
- Champions: Dinamo Zagreb
- Relegated: Lučko; Šibenik; Karlovac; Varaždin
- Champions League: Dinamo Zagreb
- Europa League: Hajduk Split; Slaven Belupo; Osijek
- Matches: 231
- Goals: 552 (2.39 per match)
- Top goalscorer: Fatos Bećiraj (15)
- Biggest home win: Dinamo Zagreb 7–0
- Biggest away win: Varaždin 0–4 Dinamo Zagreb; Lučko 0–4 Dinamo Zagreb; Osijek 0–4 Dinamo Zagreb
- Highest scoring: Zadar 4–4 Rijeka
- Average attendance: 2,087

The 2011–12 Croatian First Football League (also known as 1. HNL; officially styled as MAXtv Prva Liga for sponsorship reasons) was the 21st season of the Croatian First Football League, the national championship for men's association football teams in Croatia, since its establishment in 1992. The season started on 23 July 2011 and ended on 12 May 2012.

== Format changes ==
On 5 July 2010 the Croatian Football Federation Executive committee reached a decision to reduce the number of teams competing in Prva HNL to twelve for the 2011–12 season of the competition. This meant that the bottom five placed teams would be relegated and only the champion of the 2010–11 Druga HNL would earn a promotion to Prva HNL. This decision was confirmed by the Croatian Football Federation Assembly on 14 July 2010. The twelve-teams format would only be a temporary solution before the number of teams is further reduced to ten for either 2012–13 or 2013–14 Prva HNL season.

The decision to reduce the number of teams competing in Prva HNL was supported by 30 out of 48 Croatian Football Federation representatives, with 13 representatives voting against the proposal and five of them undecided. On behalf of the executive committee, Ante Vučemilović explained that the current format with sixteen teams does not contribute to development of football in Croatia and the standard of its domestic competitions.

However, CFF Assembly on 17 December 2010 delayed the execution of this changes by one year. Instead, the league will stay at 16 teams with only the last three teams being relegated and the first three teams from 2010 to 2011 Druga HNL earning promotion (if they are granted with top level license). In case of 16 teams not acquiring top level license, format with 12 teams will be applied.

On 4 April 2011, CFF announced that the first stage of licensing procedure for 2011–12 season was completed. For the 2011–12 Prva HNL, only eight clubs were issued a top level license: Dinamo Zagreb, Hajduk Split, Inter Zaprešić, Istra 1961, Lokomotiva, Slaven Belupo, Varaždin and NK Zagreb. Out of these eight, only Lokomotiva and NK Zagreb weren't issued a license for participating in UEFA competitions. In the second stage of licensing procedure clubs that didn't get a license appealed on the decision and provided new facts and arguments. On 4 May 2011, it was announced that all remaining Prva HNL clubs were granted top level license. Additionally, Cibalia, Rijeka and RNK Split obtained a license for UEFA competitions. Only three teams from Druga HNL acquired the top level license: Dugopolje, Gorica and Lučko, where the latter two are set to play outside of their home venues.

However, Dugopolje didn't manage to finish the season within top five places which would secure them promotion. The remaining clubs were given a deadline until 6 June 2011 to confirm their participation in the 2011–12 season. All clubs of the previous Prva HNL season have done so, with Druga HNL teams Lučko and Gorica applying on the last day. This meant that the format with 16 teams was prolonged by one more season, meaning five clubs are going to be relegated at the end of this season. The status of 14th placed Lokomotiva was in question after the 3rd placed team from Druga HNL, Pomorac, contested the decision of CFF and tried to obtain the license through arbitration. On 9 June 2011, arbitrary committee rejected the appeal with two votes against one. Istra 1961 appealed on the decision to include Gorica in the Prva HNL on terms of their license conditions concerning stadium infrastructure. The appeal was successful and on 20 June 2011 arbitrary committee revoked Gorica's top level license allowing Istra 1961 to remain in the Prva HNL.

== Stadia and locations ==
The following is a complete list of teams who will contest the 2011–12 Prva HNL. The league will be contested by 15 clubs from the previous season plus the newly promoted NK Lučko who replaced the bottom placed team from the previous season, NK Hrvatski Dragovoljac. Druga HNL champions HNK Gorica were initially promoted, but after the appeal from NK Istra 1961, their license was revoked.

Locations of teams in 2011–12 Prva HNL

Stadium	City	Home club	Licensed club(s)	Capacity
Maksimir	Zagreb	Dinamo Zagreb	Lokomotiva	37,168
Poljud	Split	Hajduk Split		34,448
Gradski vrt	Osijek	Osijek		22,050
Kantrida	Rijeka	Rijeka		12,600
Stadion HNK Cibalia	Vinkovci	Cibalia		9,958
Varteks	Varaždin	Varaždin		9,099
Aldo Drosina	Pula	Istra 1961		8,923
Kranjčevićeva	Zagreb	NK Zagreb	Lučko	8,850
Šubićevac	Šibenik	Šibenik		8,500
Branko Čavlović-Čavlek	Karlovac	Karlovac		8,000
Park mladeži	Split	RNK Split		8,000
Stanovi	Zadar	Zadar		5,860
ŠRC Zaprešić	Zaprešić	Inter Zaprešić		5,228
Gradski stadion	Koprivnica	Slaven Belupo		3,059

=== Personnel and kits ===
As of 2 May 2012

Team	Manager	Captain	Kit manufacturer	Shirt sponsor
Cibalia	(Croatia) Samir Toplak	(Croatia) Mario Lučić	Jako	Croatia Osiguranje
Dinamo Zagreb	(Croatia) Ante Čačić	(Croatia) Milan Badelj	Puma	Konzum
Hajduk Split	(Croatia) Mišo Krstičević	(Croatia) Srđan Andrić	Umbro	
Inter Zaprešić	(Croatia) Borimir Perković	(Croatia) Tomislav Šarić	Joma	VŠPU "B.A.Krčelić"
Istra 1961	(Croatia) Igor Pamić	(Croatia) Fausto Budicin	Legea	
Karlovac	(Croatia) Sanjin Lucijanić	(Croatia) Matija Štefančić	Macron	HS Produkt
Lokomotiva	(Croatia) Tomislav Ivković	(Croatia) Leonard Mesarić	Puma	
Lučko	(Croatia) Željko Kopić	(Croatia) Krunoslav Rendulić	Jako	
Osijek	(Croatia) Stanko Mršić	(Croatia) Ivo Smoje	Jako	Croatia Osiguranje
Rijeka	(Croatia) Elvis Scoria	(Bosnia and Herzegovina) Igor Čagalj	Jako	Croatia Osiguranje
Slaven Belupo	(Croatia) Roy Ferenčina	(Croatia) Alen Maras	Adidas	Belupo
RNK Split	(Croatia) Tonći Bašić	(Croatia) Andrija Vuković	Jako	Skladgradnja
Šibenik	(Croatia) Goran Tomić	(Croatia) Hrvoje Spahija	Jako	Zagrebačka banka
Varaždin	(Croatia) Branko Janžek	(Croatia) Ivan Conjar	Legea/Givova	Croatia osiguranje
Zadar	(Croatia) Dalibor Zebić	(Croatia) Jakov Surać	Jako	
NK Zagreb	(Croatia) Dražen Besek	(Croatia) Hrvoje Štrok	Givova	

=== Managerial changes ===
Team	Outgoing manager	Manner of departure	Date of vacancy	Replaced by	Date of appointment	Position in table
Dinamo Zagreb	(Bosnia and Herzegovina) Vahid Halilhodžić	Mutual consent	24 May 2011	(Croatia) Krunoslav Jurčić	26 May 2011	Pre-season
Lokomotiva	(Croatia) Krunoslav Jurčić	Signed by Dinamo Zagreb	26 May 2011	(Croatia) Marijo Tot	1 June 2011	Pre-season
Hajduk Split	(Croatia) Ante Miše	Removed from position	27 May 2011	(Bulgaria) Krasimir Balakov	27 May 2011	Pre-season
Rijeka	(Croatia) Elvis Scoria	Mutual consent	16 June 2011	(Croatia) Alen Horvat	21 June 2011	Pre-season
RNK Split	(Croatia) Ivan Katalinić	Sacked	14 August 2011	(Croatia) Tonći Bašić	14 August 2011	10th
Lučko	(Croatia) Dražen Biškup	Sacked	23 August 2011	(Croatia) Željko Kopić	23 August 2011	15th
Cibalia	(Croatia) Stanko Mršić	Sacked	28 August 2011	(Croatia) Samir Toplak	30 August 2011	13th
Varaždin	(Croatia) Samir Toplak	Resigned	29 August 2011	(Austria) Tomica Kocijan	30 August 2011	16th
Šibenik	(Croatia) Vjekoslav Lokica	Mutual consent	1 September 2011	(Croatia) Goran Tomić	1 September 2011	12th
Karlovac	(Croatia) Srećko Lušić	Mutual consent	5 September 2011	(Croatia) Damir Petravić	6 September 2011	14th
NK Zagreb	(Croatia) Luka Pavlović	Resigned	26 September 2011	(Croatia) Gordan Ciprić	26 September 2011	9th
Rijeka	(Croatia) Alen Horvat	Sacked	4 October 2011	(Bosnia and Herzegovina) Ivo Ištuk	4 October 2011	8th
Varaždin	(Austria) Tomica Kocijan	Sacked	15 October 2011	(Croatia) Branko Janžek	15 October 2011	16th
Lokomotiva	(Croatia) Marijo Tot	Mutual consent	29 October 2011	(Croatia) Ante Čačić	29 October 2011	11th
Dinamo Zagreb	(Croatia) Krunoslav Jurčić	Sacked	7 December 2011	(Croatia) Ante Čačić	23 December 2011	1st
Lokomotiva	(Croatia) Ante Čačić	Signed by Dinamo Zagreb	23 December 2011	(Croatia) Tomislav Ivković	24 December 2011	6th
Karlovac	(Croatia) Damir Petravić	Resigned	31 December 2011	(Croatia) Krešimir Ganjto	4 January 2012	15th
Karlovac	(Croatia) Krešimir Ganjto	Sacked	1 March 2012	(Croatia) Sanjin Lucijanić	1 March 2012	15th
Rijeka	(Bosnia and Herzegovina) Ivo Ištuk	Sacked	18 March 2012	(Croatia) Dragan Skočić	19 March 2012	7th
Hajduk Split	(Bulgaria) Krasimir Balakov	Signed by Kaiserslautern	22 March 2012	(Croatia) Mišo Krstičević	22 March 2012	2nd
NK Zagreb	(Croatia) Gordan Ciprić	Sacked	27 March 2012	(Croatia) Dražen Besek	27 March 2012	11th
Osijek	(Croatia) Vlado Bilić	Mutual consent	31 March 2012	(Croatia) Stanko Mršić	31 March 2012	12th
Inter Zaprešić	(Croatia) Ilija Lončarević	Sacked	22 April 2012	(Croatia) Borimir Perković	22 April 2012	12th
Rijeka	(Croatia) Dragan Skočić	Sacked	30 April 2012	(Croatia) Elvis Scoria	2 May 2012	12th

== League table ==
Pos	Team	Pld	W	D	L	GF	GA	GD	Pts	Qualification or relegation
1	Dinamo Zagreb (C)	30	23	6	1	73	11	+62	75	Qualification to Champions League second qualifying round
2	Hajduk Split	30	16	6	8	50	24	+26	54	Qualification to Europa League second qualifying round (Note: Since 2011–12 Croatian Cup winners Dinamo Zagreb qualified for the 2012–13 UEFA Champions League, so cup runners-up Osijek qualified for the 2012–13 UEFA Europa League first qualifying round. Moreover, Slaven Belupo were moved up a round as the cup winner spot was not used.)
3	Slaven Belupo	30	14	10	6	41	27	+14	52	Qualification to Europa League second qualifying round
4	RNK Split	30	14	8	8	43	32	+11	50	
5	Cibalia	30	13	6	11	35	35	0	45	
6	NK Zagreb	30	13	6	11	36	42	−6	45	
7	Lokomotiva	30	12	8	10	33	33	0	44	
8	Osijek	30	11	10	9	45	38	+7	43	Qualification to Europa League first qualifying round
9	Istra 1961	30	11	9	10	35	33	+2	42	
10	Zadar	30	11	7	12	29	44	−15	40	
11	Inter Zaprešić	30	11	5	14	33	33	0	38	
12	Rijeka	30	9	11	10	29	29	0	38	
13	Lučko (R)	30	6	13	11	29	36	−7	31	Relegation to Croatian Second Football League
14	Šibenik (R)	30	6	9	15	27	39	−12	27	Relegation to Croatian Second Football League
15	Karlovac (Note: Karlovac were deducted 1 point after they failed to appear on the match against Rijeka) (R)	30	6	7	17	25	53	−28	24	Relegation to Croatian Second Football League
16	Varaždin (Note: Varaždin were deducted 1 point after they failed to play the match against Rijeka due to suspension) (D, R)	24	2	3	19	16	52	−36	8	Relegation to Croatian Second Football League (Note: After Varaždin failed to play two matches due to suspension, according to the competition rulebook they were considered to have withdrawn from the competition and since they have played more than a half of matches in the second part of the season, those matches were considered valid and all further matches were awarded as 3–0 forfeit wins to their opponents. Also according to the rulebook, since Varaždin left the competition after the 24th round, the number of matches they have played will stay at 24 in the league table.)

Source: Sportnet.hr
Rules for classification: 1) points; 2) goal difference; 3) number of goals scored.
For deciding champions, qualification to UEFA Europa League and relegation: 1st points; 2nd head-to-head points; 3rd head-to-head goal difference; 4th head-to-head away goals scored
(C) Champions; (D) Disqualified; (R) Relegated

== Results ==
Home \ Away	CIB	DIN	HAJ	INT	IST	KAR	LOK	LUČ	OSI	RIJ	SLA	SPL	ŠIB	VAR	ZAD	ZAG
Cibalia		2–2	0–2	0–1	1–0	2–0	1–0	1–3	0–1	2–0	1–4	2–1	5–1	3–0 (Note: Varaždin was suspended and thus unable to play the match so the game was awarded 3–0)	2–0	0–2
Dinamo Zagreb	2–0		2–1	2–0	4–1	5–0	6–0	1–0	1–0	2–0	2–0	0–0	2–1	7–0	1–1	1–0
Hajduk Split	1–0	1–1		1–2	1–1	1–0	0–1	1–2	3–1	2–1	4–1	0–0	2–1	3–0	1–0	4–0
Inter Zaprešić	1–1	0–0	1–0		1–1	4–0	1–1	1–1	2–0	1–0	0–1	0–3	2–0	3–0 (Note: After Varaždin failed to play two matches against Rijeka and Cibalia, they were expelled and all their remaining matches were awarded 3–0 to opponents)	2–0	3–1
Istra 1961	3–0	0–2	0–3	2–1		2–0	2–1	2–0	0–1	0–0 (Note: Match was replayed after it was originally abandoned in 71st minute at the result 1–0 for Istra 1961 due to thrown flares from supporters of both teams)	2–1	2–0	2–1	2–1	1–1	0–1
Karlovac	2–2	0–3	1–1	0–1	2–1		0–1	0–0	2–0	1–2	0–0	1–3	1–0	3–0	2–0	3–3
Lokomotiva	1–2	1–2	1–0	2–0	0–2	2–1		2–2	1–4	0–0	0–0	1–0	2–0	1–0	3–0	2–3
Lučko	0–1	0–4	0–3	2–0	0–2	1–0	2–2		2–2	1–1	1–1	1–2	0–0	3–0	1–1	0–1
Osijek	1–2	0–4	2–1	1–0	2–1	1–1	1–1	2–2		1–1	2–0	3–2	0–0	2–2	5–0	4–0
Rijeka	1–1	1–1	0–3	1–0	0–0	3–0 (Note: Match was awarded 3–0 to Rijeka, as Karlovac players were on strike and refused to travel to Rijeka)	0–0	1–0	1–0		1–1	2–0	1–0	2–0	0–1	0–1
Slaven Belupo	0–1	0–2	1–1	3–2	2–2	3–0	3–1	1–1	2–0	1–0		2–0	1–0	1–0	2–0	1–0
RNK Split	1–1	0–3	1–1	1–0	3–1	3–1	1–0	1–1	2–2	2–0	1–1		2–0	2–2	3–1	2–0
Šibenik	3–0	0–3	1–2	2–0	0–0	4–1	0–1	1–1	1–1	2–2	1–1	1–2		1–0	1–1	2–1
Varaždin	0–1	0–4	0–3	3–2	2–2	0–1	0–2	0–2	0–3	0–3	0–3	1–2	2–1		1–2	2–3
Zadar	1–0	2–1	1–0	2–1	0–0	2–2	0–3	1–0	2–1	4–4	1–3	2–1	0–1	2–0		1–0
NK Zagreb	1–1	0–3	2–4	2–1	2–1	3–0	0–0	1–0	2–2	2–1	1–1	0–2	1–1	1–0	2–0	

Source: Sportnet.hr
Legend: Blue = home team win; Yellow = draw; Red = away team win.

== Top goalscorers ==
As of 12 May 2012; Source: Prva-HNL

Rank	Player	Club	Goals
1	(Montenegro) Fatos Bećiraj	Dinamo Zagreb	15
2	(Croatia) Ante Vukušić	Hajduk Split	12
3	(Bosnia and Herzegovina) Ivan Krstanović	Dinamo Zagreb	10
3	(Croatia) Ivan Santini	Zadar	10
5	(Croatia) Damir Kreilach	Rijeka	9
6	(Croatia) Stipe Bačelić-Grgić	Šibenik / Istra 1961	8
6	(Bosnia and Herzegovina) Mladen Bartolović	Cibalia	8
6	(Croatia) Duje Čop	RNK Split	8
6	(Croatia) Sandi Križman	Rijeka / Istra 1961	8
6	(Croatia) Marin Tomasov	Hajduk Split	8

== Attendances ==
#	Club	Average
1	Hajduk	9,567
2	Dinamo Zagreb	3,113
3	Rijeka	2,643
4	Istra	2,493
5	Osijek	1,827
6	Cibalia	1,814
7	Slaven	1,790
8	Zadar	1,660
9	Šibenik	1,213
10	Karlovac	1,196
11	Radnički	1,193
12	Zagreb	973
13	Zaprešić	889
14	Lučko	879
15	Varteks	770
16	Lokomotiva	581

== See also ==
- 2011–12 Croatian Football Cup
- 2011–12 Croatian Second Football League
