= Alen Pamić =

Croatian footballer

- Alen Pamić in 2010 with Standard Liège

Personal information
- Date of birth: 15 October 1989
- Place of birth: Žminj, SR Croatia, SFR Yugoslavia
- Date of death: 21 June 2013 (aged 23)
- Place of death: Maružini near Kanfanar, Croatia
- Height: 1.94 m (6 ft 4 in)
- Position: Midfielder

Youth career
- 2006–2007: Žminj

Senior career*
Years	Team	Apps	(Gls)
2007–2008	Karlovac	31	(4)
2008–2010	Rijeka	52	(5)
2010–2011	Standard Liège	0	(0)
2011–2013	Istra 1961	24	(1)
Total		107	(10)

International career
2006–2007	Croatia U19	2	(0)
2008	Croatia U20	1	(0)
- * Club domestic league appearances and goals

Alen Pamić (15 October 1989 – 21 June 2013) was a Croatian professional footballer who last played for NK Istra 1961.

== Personal life ==
Alen was the son of Croatia international Igor Pamić, his younger brother Zvonko is also a professional footballer.

=== Death ===
He had a history of heart problems, and died on 21 June 2013 while playing indoor football with friends. His death cause was a hypercholesterolemia and coronary artery plaque, similar to that of Russian pair skater Sergei Grinkov.

== Career statistics ==
Appearances and goals by club, season and competition
Club	Season	League			Cup		Europe		Total	
Club	Season	Division	Apps	Goals	Apps	Goals	Apps	Goals	Apps	Goals
NK Karlovac	2007–08	Treća HNL - West	31	4	0	0	–		31	4
HNK Rijeka	2008–09	Prva HNL	27	2	3	0	2	0	32	2
HNK Rijeka	2009–10	Prva HNL	26	3	2	0	3	0	31	3
HNK Rijeka	Total		53	5	5	0	5	0	63	5
Standard Liège	2010–11	Jupiler Pro League	0	0	0	0	–		0	0
NK Istra 1961	2011–12	Prva HNL	10	0	1	0	–		11	0
NK Istra 1961	2012–13	Prva HNL	14	1	0	0	–		14	0
NK Istra 1961	Total		24	1	1	0	0	0	25	1
Career total			108	10	6	0	5	0	119	10

== Honours ==
Karlovac

- Treća HNL – West: 2007–08

== See also ==
- List of association footballers who died while playing
