= Zvonko Pamić =

Croatian footballer (born 1991)

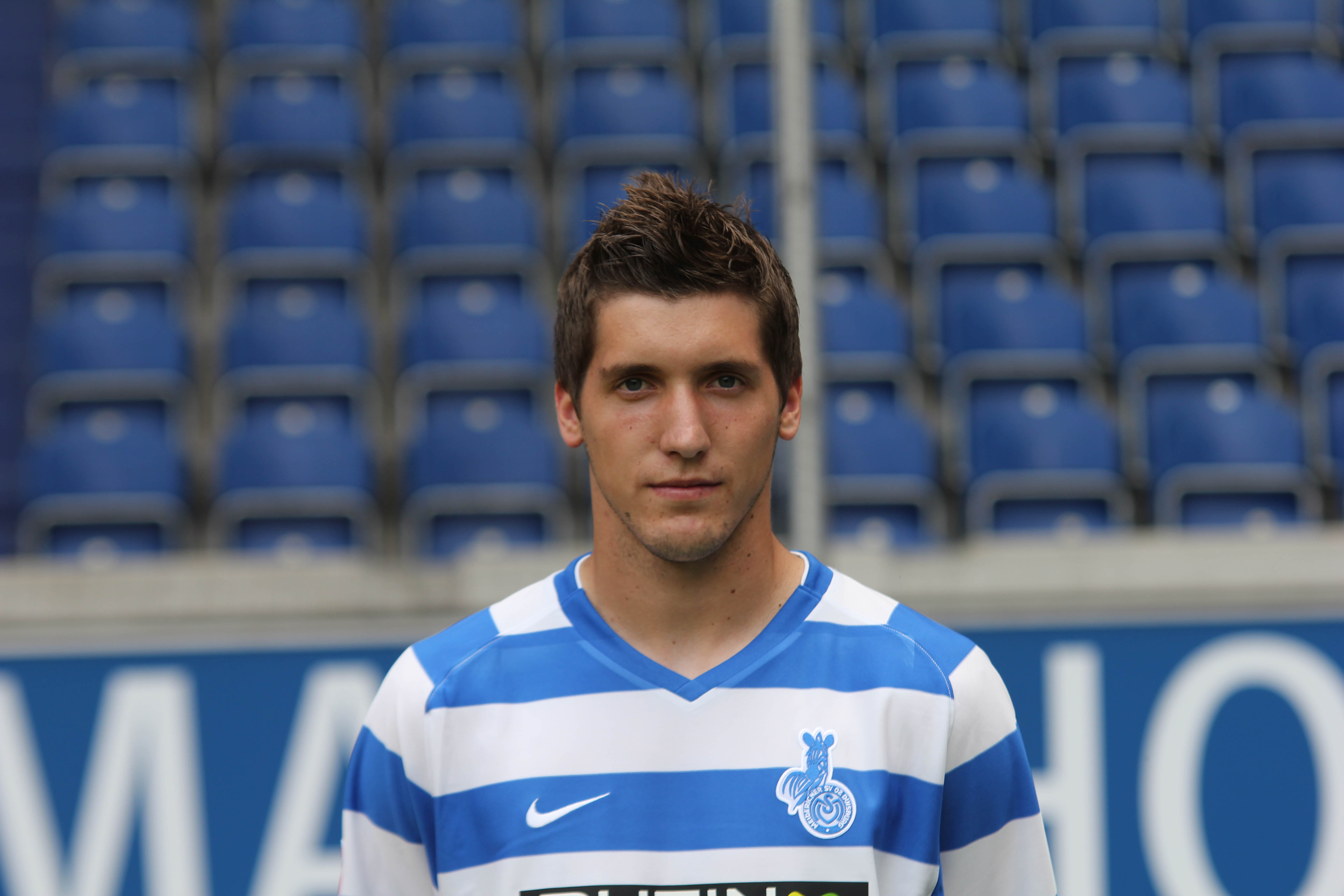
- Pamić with Duisburg in 2012

Personal information
- Date of birth: 4 February 1991 (age 35)
- Place of birth: Pula, SR Croatia, SFR Yugoslavia
- Height: 1.85 m (6 ft 1 in)
- Position: Midfielder

Team information
- Current team: Karlovac 1919
- Number: 20

Youth career
- Žminj

Senior career*
Years	Team	Apps	(Gls)
2007	Žminj	18	(3)
2008–2010	Rijeka	0	(0)
2008–2010	→ Karlovac (loan)	71	(22)
2010–2012	Bayer Leverkusen	0	(0)
2010–2011	→ SC Freiburg (loan)	2	(0)
2011–2012	→ MSV Duisburg (loan)	37	(1)
2013–2018	Dinamo Zagreb	27	(2)
2014–2015	→ Istra 1961 (loan)	20	(3)
2015–2016	→ Lokomotiva (loan)	16	(0)
2018	→ Hrvatski Dragovoljac (loan)	11	(3)
2018–2019	Titograd	11	(2)
2019	Široki Brijeg	4	(0)
2019–2021	Krško	16	(5)
2021–	Karlovac 1919	120	(21)

International career
2007	Croatia U16	5	(0)
2009	Croatia U18	2	(0)
2009–2010	Croatia U19	9	(4)
2010–2011	Croatia U21	6	(1)
- * Club domestic league appearances and goals as of 17 June 2026

Zvonko Pamić (born 4 February 1991) is a Croatian professional footballer who plays as a midfielder for Karlovac 1919.

== Club career ==
=== Early career ===
Pamić began his career with NK Žminj where he earned his first professional caps in the 2007–08 season. Together with his brother Alen Pamić and cousin Sandi Križman, they signed for Rijeka in January 2008. They were then sent on loan to Karlovac for the remainder of the season, where their father Igor Pamić was coach at the time. Although his brother and cousin would return to Rijeka for the 2008–09 season, Zvonko spent the next two seasons playing a significant role for Karlovac before leaving for Germany, having never made an official appearance for the Bijeli.

=== Bayer Leverkusen ===
On 17 April 2010, Bayer 04 Leverkusen agreed terms with Croatian club Rijeka for the signing of the 19-year-old midfielder on a five-year deal. On 27 May 2010, Leverkusen loaned Pamić to fellow Bundesliga team SC Freiburg. While being on loan at Freiburg, he made only two official appearances in Bundesliga.

==== MSV Duisburg loan ====
On 27 May 2011, it was announced by Bayer Leverkusen that Pamić would join MSV Duisburg for the 2011–12 season on loan. He scored his first goal for the team in November 2011. In his first season with MSV Duisburg, Pamić made total of 24 Bundesliga appearance, adding one in DFB-Pokal. MSV and Bayer reached the agreement about Pamić, and the loan was extended until June 2013. He made another 13 appearances for Duisburg until January 2013.

=== Dinamo Zagreb ===
In January 2013, the loan at MSV Duisburg was terminated and Pamić returned to Croatia to join Dinamo Zagreb. On 25 September 2013 he impressed Dinamo's fans and the Croatian Media becoming the first-ever Croatian player in the history of Dinamo Zagreb to score a goal direct from a Corner kick. Pamić scored the Corner kick-goal in the first round of the 2013–14 Croatian Cup in the match against HNK Suhopolje. Now Pamić is playing regularly for At one moment, Pamić was a regular first choice and was the top assist provider in Dinamo Zagreb's squad.

==== Istra 1961, Lokomotiva and Hrvatski Dragovoljac loans ====
After an injury, Pamić did not become first choice again at Dinamo, and for that reason he was loaned out to NK Istra 1961 from 2014 to 2015, NK Lokomotiva from 2015 to 2016 and NK Hrvatski Dragovoljac in 2018.

=== Titograd ===
From June 2018 to January 2019 he played for OFK Titograd during the first part of the 2018–19 Montenegrin First League. While at Titograd, he scored 2 league goals in 11 league games.

=== Široki Brijeg ===
On 9 January 2019, Pamić signed a contract with Premier League of Bosnia and Herzegovina club NK Široki Brijeg. He made his debut for Široki on 3 April 2019, in a 2–0 cup semi-final game win against NK TOŠK Tešanj. Pamić made his league debut for Široki Brijeg on 7 April 2019, in a 1–0 home win against NK GOŠK Gabela.

In the 2018–19 season, Pamić and Široki Brijeg finished as Bosnian Cup runner-ups after losing to FK Sarajevo in the final. On 26 May 2019, Pamić decided to leave Široki Brijeg.

== International career ==
Pamić also represented Croatia at various youth international levels On 24 July 2010, Pamić scored a hat-trick in a U-19 game against Portugal at the 2010 UEFA European U-19 Championship in France. Croatia won the game 5–0.

== Personal life ==
He is the son of ex-Croatia international footballer and now coach Igor Pamić. Zvonko's older brother was Alen Pamić, a professional footballer who died of a heart attack during a recreational game on 21 June 2013 at the age of 23.

== Career statistics ==
=== Club ===
As of match played 11 May 2019

Appearances and goals by club, season and competition
Club	Season	League	League		Cup		Continental		Total	
Club	Season	League	Apps	Goals	Apps	Goals	Apps	Goals	Apps	Goals
Žminj	2007–08	Druga HNL	18	3	0	0	0	0	18	3
Karlovac 1919	2007–08	Treća HNL	13	10	0	0	0	0	13	10
Karlovac 1919	2008–09	Druga HNL	28	7	0	0	0	0	28	7
Karlovac 1919	2009–10	Prva HNL	30	5	0	0	0	0	30	5
Karlovac 1919	Total		71	22	0	0	0	0	71	22
Bayer Leverkusen	2010–11	Bundesliga	0	0	0	0	0	0	0	0
SC Freiburg (loan)	2010–11	Bundesliga	2	0	0	0	0	0	2	0
MSV Duisburg (loan)	2011–12	2. Bundesliga	24	1	1	0	0	0	25	1
MSV Duisburg (loan)	2012–13	2. Bundesliga	13	0	1	0	0	0	14	0
MSV Duisburg (loan)	Total		37	1	2	0	0	0	39	1
Dinamo Zagreb	2012–13	Prva HNL	9	2	0	0	0	0	9	2
Dinamo Zagreb	2013–14	Prva HNL	16	0	3	2	9	0	28	2
Dinamo Zagreb	Total		25	2	3	2	9	0	37	4
Istra 1961	2014–15	Prva HNL	20	3	1	1	–		21	4
Dinamo Zagreb	2015–16	Prva HNL	2	0	–		1	0	3	0
Lokomotiva	2015–16	Prva HNL	16	0	1	0	–		17	0
Hrvatski Dragovoljac	2017–18	Druga HNL	11	2	–		–		11	2
Titograd	2018–19	Montenegrin First League	11	2	0	0	–		11	2
Široki Brijeg	2018–19	Bosnian Premier League	4	0	2	0	–		6	0
Career total			217	35	9	3	10	0	238	38

== Honours ==
Dinamo Zagreb

- Croatian First League: 2012–13
- Croatian Supercup: 2013

Široki Brijeg

- Bosnian Cup runner up: 2018–19

Individual

- Prva HNL top assist provider: 2009–10
- Best Sportsman of the Karlovac County: 2010
