= Pamić =

Pamić is a Croatian surname. Notable people with the surname include:

- Alen Pamić (1989–2013), Croatian football player
- Igor Pamić (born 1969), Croatian football manager and former player
- Manuel Pamić (born 1986), Croatian football player
- Zvonko Pamić (born 1991), Croatian football player

== See also ==
- Pamich
