= 2009–10 Croatian First Football League =

T-Com Prva HNL
- Season: 2009–10
- Champions: Dinamo Zagreb; 12th Croatian title 16th domestic title
- Relegated: Croatia Sesvete; Međimurje
- Champions League: Dinamo Zagreb
- Europa League: Hajduk Split; Cibalia; Šibenik
- Matches: 240
- Goals: 649 (2.7 per match)
- Top goalscorer: Davor Vugrinec (18)
- Biggest home win: Dinamo Z. 7–1 Istra 1961
- Biggest away win: Međimurje 1–5 Rijeka
- Highest scoring: Dinamo Z. 7–1 Istra 1961
- Average attendance: 1,871

The 2009–10 Croatian First Football League (also known as 1. HNL; officially styled as T-Com Prva HNL for sponsorship reasons) was the nineteenth season of the Croatian First Football League, the national championship for men's association football teams in Croatia, since its establishment in 1992. It began on 24 July 2009 and ended on 13 May 2010. Dinamo Zagreb were the defending champions, having won their eleventh championship title (and fourth consecutive title) the previous season, and they defended the title again, after a goalless draw with Hajduk Split on 1 May 2010.

The format was changed from previous season in that the league was expanded from 12 to 16 clubs.

== Promotion and relegation from 2008–09 ==
Due to the expansion, no teams were directly relegated following the 2008–09 season.

Four teams from 2008–09 Druga HNL earned direct promotion. These were champions Istra 1961, runners-up Karlovac, third-placed Lokomotiva and fifth-placed Međimurje. Fourth-placed team Slavonac CO had to step back from promotion after they were not able to find a suitable ground.

Croatia Sesvete as last-placed team had to compete in a two-legged play-off against the sixth-placed team from Druga HNL, Hrvatski Dragovoljac. After a scoreless first leg, Croatia Sesvete retained their Prva HNL status by winning the second leg, 2–1.

== Overview ==
=== Teams ===
Team	Head coach	Team captain	2008–09 result	Kitmaker	Shirt sponsor
Cibalia	(Croatia) Stanko Mršić	(Croatia) Boris Leutar	8th	Jako	Croatia osiguranje
Croatia Sesvete	(Croatia) Goran Jerković	(Croatia) Saša Mus	12th	Diadora	
Dinamo Zagreb	(Croatia) Krunoslav Jurčić	(Croatia) Igor Bišćan	1st	Diadora	INA, Croatia osiguranje
Hajduk Split	(Croatia) Stanko Poklepović	(Croatia) Srđan Andrić	2nd	Umbro	INA
Inter Zaprešić	(Croatia) Ilija Lončarević	(Croatia) Tomislav Šarić	9th	Legea	Hidrocommerce
Istra 1961	(Croatia) Zoran Vulić	(Croatia) Dalibor Pauletić	2. HNL, 1st	Legea	Puris, Favorit pivo
Karlovac	(Croatia) Igor Pamić	(Croatia) Matija Štefančić	2. HNL, 2nd	Legea	
Lokomotiva	(Croatia) Roy Ferenčina	(Croatia) Željko Sopić	2. HNL, 3rd	Legea	
Međimurje	(Croatia) Tomislav Ivković	(Croatia) Mario Darmopil	2. HNL, 5th	Legea	
Osijek	(Croatia) Tomislav Steinbrückner	(Croatia) Domagoj Vida	7th	Legea	Croatia osiguranje
Rijeka	(Croatia) Nenad Gračan	(Croatia) Fausto Budicin	3rd	Jako	Croatia osiguranje
Slaven Belupo	(Croatia) Zlatko Dalić	(Croatia) Dalibor Poldrugač	4th	Adidas	Belupo
Šibenik	(Croatia) Branko Karačić	(Croatia) Arijan Ademi	6th	Jako	
Varteks	(Croatia) Samir Toplak	(Croatia) Miljenko Mumlek	10th	Legea	Croatia osiguranje
Zadar	(Croatia) Dalibor Zebić	(Croatia) Jakov Surać	11th	Jako	
NK Zagreb	(Croatia) Igor Štimac	(Croatia) Ivan Parlov	5th	Legea	

=== Stadia and locations ===
Since most Druga HNL stadiums failed to meet the licensing requirements for top-level football, the Croatian Football Federation announced on 8 May 2008 that clubs who are likely to win promotion berths have agreed to lease stadiums approved for top-flight football. Below is the list of all the stadiums which are licensed to be used in the Prva HNL, along with their home clubs and the promoted clubs who secured rights to use them as "guests" until their own grounds have sufficiently been upgraded to host top-level matches.

Locations of teams in 2009–10 Prva HNL

Stadium	City	Home club	Licensed club(s)	Capacity
Stadion HNK Cibalia	Vinkovci	Cibalia		9,920
ŠRC Zaprešić	Zaprešić	Inter Zaprešić		4,528
Kranjčevićeva	Zagreb	NK Zagreb	Croatia Sesvete	8,850
Kantrida	Rijeka	Rijeka		10,275
Poljud	Split	Hajduk Split		35,000
Stadion Varteks	Varaždin	Varteks		10,800
Maksimir	Zagreb	Dinamo Zagreb	Lokomotiva	37,168
Gradski vrt	Osijek	Osijek		19,500
Gradski stadion	Koprivnica	Slaven Belupo		4,000
Šubićevac	Šibenik	Šibenik		8,000
Stanovi	Zadar	Zadar		5,860
Branko Čavlović-Čavlek	Karlovac	Karlovac		12,000
SRC Mladost	Čakovec	Međimurje		8,000
Veruda	Pula	Istra 1961		3,000

=== Managerial changes ===
Team	Outgoing manager	Manner of departure	Date of vacancy	Replaced by	Date of appointment	Position in table
Slaven Belupo	(Croatia) Mile Petković	Mutual consent	31 May 2009	(Croatia) Milivoj Bračun	9 June 2009	Pre-season
Hajduk Split	(Croatia) Ante Miše	Resigned	2 August 2009	(Croatia) Ivica Kalinić	3 August 2009	12th
Šibenik	(Croatia) Ivica Kalinić	Resigned	3 August 2009	(Croatia) Branko Karačić	11 August 2009	5th
Slaven Belupo	(Croatia) Milivoj Bračun	Mutual consent	6 August 2009	(Croatia) Zlatko Dalić	8 August 2009	6th
Hajduk Split	(Croatia) Ivica Kalinić	Mutual consent	18 August 2009	(Italy) Edoardo Reja	18 August 2009	13th
Croatia Sesvete	(Croatia) Anto Petrović	Sacked	1 September 2009	(Croatia) Nenad Gračan	1 September 2009	15th
NK Zagreb	(Croatia) Luka Pavlović	Resigned	11 September 2009	(Croatia) Igor Štimac	14 September 2009	16th
Rijeka	(Croatia) Robert Rubčić	Resigned	21 September 2009	(Croatia) Zoran Vulić	22 September 2009	7th
Međimurje	(Croatia) Mario Ćutuk	Sacked	8 October 2009	(Croatia) Srećko Bogdan	9 October 2009	11th
Istra 1961	(Croatia) Elvis Scoria	Mutual consent	2 November 2009	(Croatia) Valdi Šumberac		14th
Rijeka	(Croatia) Zoran Vulić	Resigned	10 November 2009	(Croatia) Nenad Gračan	10 November 2009	7th
Croatia Sesvete	(Croatia) Nenad Gračan	Resigned	10 November 2009	(Croatia) Anto Petrović		15th
Croatia Sesvete	(Croatia) Anto Petrović	Resigned	24 November 2009	(Austria) Adolf Pinter	19 January 2010	16th
Varteks	(Croatia) Dražen Besek	Mutual consent	26 December 2009	(Croatia) Damir Jagačić	4 January 2010	11th
Hajduk Split	(Italy) Edoardo Reja	Signed by Lazio	9 February 2010	(Croatia) Stanko Poklepović	12 February 2010	7th
Istra 1961	(Croatia) Valdi Šumberac	Sacked	28 February 2010	(Croatia) Zoran Vulić	28 February 2010	15th
Croatia Sesvete	(Austria) Adolf Pinter	Sacked	5 March 2010	(Croatia) Goran Jerković	5 March 2010	16th
Varteks	(Croatia) Damir Jagačić	Sacked	15 March 2010	(Croatia) Samir Toplak	15 March 2010	11th
Međimurje	(Croatia) Srećko Bogdan	Sacked	2 April 2010	(Croatia) Tomislav Ivković	3 April 2010	12th
Inter Zaprešić	(Croatia) Borimir Perković	Sacked	11 April 2010	(Croatia) Ilija Lončarević	11 April 2010	12th

== League table ==
Pos	Team	Pld	W	D	L	GF	GA	GD	Pts	Qualification or relegation
1	Dinamo Zagreb (C)	30	18	8	4	70	20	+50	62	Qualification to Champions League second qualifying round
2	Hajduk Split	30	17	7	6	50	21	+29	58	Qualification to Europa League third qualifying round (Note: Hajduk Split won the 2009–10 Croatian Cup and thus qualified for the third qualifying round of the 2010–11 UEFA Europa League.)
3	Cibalia	30	16	9	5	46	20	+26	57	Qualification to Europa League second qualifying round
4	Šibenik	30	14	8	8	34	37	−3	50	Qualification to Europa League first qualifying round
5	Osijek	30	13	8	9	49	36	+13	47	
6	Karlovac	30	12	11	7	32	23	+9	47	
7	Slaven Belupo	30	11	10	9	44	45	−1	43	
8	Lokomotiva	30	12	6	12	35	38	−3	42	
9	Rijeka	30	10	10	10	49	44	+5	40	
10	Varteks	30	9	9	12	36	43	−7	36	
11	Istra 1961	30	9	8	13	31	40	−9	35	
12	Zadar	30	9	7	14	27	41	−14	34	
13	Inter Zaprešić	30	10	3	17	36	50	−14	33 (Note: Head-to-head record: Inter Zaprešić–NK Zagreb 1–3, NK Zagreb–Inter Zaprešić 0–3.)	
14	NK Zagreb (Note: Despite finishing 14th NK Zagreb eventually avoided relegation as only two second level clubs were granted first division licences by the Croatian Football Federation.)	30	9	6	15	43	49	−6	33	
15	Međimurje (R)	30	8	5	17	37	61	−24	29	Relegation to Croatian Second Football League
16	Croatia Sesvete (R)	30	3	5	22	30	81	−51	14	Relegation to Croatian Second Football League

Source: Sportnet.hr
Rules for classification: 1) points; 2) goal difference; 3) number of goals scored.
For deciding champions, qualification to UEFA Europa League and relegation: 1st points; 2nd head-to-head points; 3rd head-to-head goal difference; 4th head-to-head away goals scored.
(C) Champions; (R) Relegated

== Results ==
Home \ Away	CIB	CRS	DIN	HAJ	INT	IST	KAR	LOK	MEĐ	OSI	RIJ	SLA	ŠIB	VAR	ZAD	ZAG
Cibalia		5–0	2–0	0–0	2–0	0–0	2–2	1–0	3–0	1–1	1–0	2–0	4–3	4–0	2–0	1–0
Croatia Sesvete	0–3		2–5	2–5	3–1	2–2	0–3	1–2	2–1	1–2	1–2	1–1	1–2	2–2	1–2	1–4
Dinamo Zagreb	1–1	6–0		0–0	3–1	7–1	1–1	1–0	4–0	5–0	6–0	6–0	5–0	2–1	0–0	1–1
Hajduk Split	2–1	6–0	2–1		2–2	1–0	1–0	1–0	4–1	1–0	1–1	5–0	0–1	2–0	0–1	2–0
Inter Zaprešić	1–0	1–2	0–1	0–3		1–0	0–1	4–2	2–1	0–3	3–0	2–0	0–1	1–1	4–3	1–3
Istra 1961	0–0	1–0	0–0	0–1	2–0		2–0	3–1	1–2	1–3	2–0	2–0	1–2	0–1	2–0	2–1
Karlovac	3–0	0–0	1–3	1–0	1–0	1–1		0–1	2–0	1–0	2–0	0–0	0–2	1–1	2–0	0–0
Lokomotiva	2–0	3–2	0–1	2–1	0–1	2–1	0–0		1–3	2–2	3–0	1–1	0–0	2–0	1–0	1–0
Međimurje	0–2	2–1	1–4	1–1	2–1	4–2	1–1	0–3		1–1	1–5	1–1	4–0	0–0	3–0	4–2
Osijek	2–0	0–0	0–1	1–1	4–2	3–0	0–1	3–0	3–1		1–0	0–1	3–0	1–1	3–0	5–3
Rijeka	1–1	4–2	2–2	2–0	3–1	2–0	1–1	6–0	4–0	1–1		2–3	0–1	3–3	3–2	3–1
Slaven Belupo	1–1	4–0	0–1	2–1	5–2	3–0	1–3	1–0	3–2	5–2	1–1		2–2	2–3	2–1	2–0
Šibenik	0–2	2–0	2–1	0–1	0–0	1–1	1–0	0–0	1–0	2–2	1–0	0–0		2–1	1–1	3–1
Varteks	1–1	4–1	1–2	0–3	2–1	0–2	0–1	2–1	3–0	1–2	1–1	0–0	5–1		1–0	1–0
Zadar	0–3	2–0	0–0	1–2	0–1	1–1	1–1	1–1	2–0	2–1	1–1	1–0	2–1	2–0		1–0
NK Zagreb	0–1	4–2	1–0	1–1	0–3	1–1	4–2	2–4	2–1	1–0	1–1	3–3	0–2	3–0	4–0	

Source: Sportnet.hr
Legend: Blue = home team win; Yellow = draw; Red = away team win.

== Top goalscorers ==
As of 13 May 2010; Source: HRnogomet.com

Rank	Player	Club	Goals
1	(Croatia) Davor Vugrinec	NK Zagreb	18
2	(Bosnia and Herzegovina) Senijad Ibričić	Hajduk Split	17
3	(Bosnia and Herzegovina) Asim Šehić	Istra 1961	15
4	(Croatia) Nino Bule	Lokomotiva	14
4	(Croatia) Mario Mandžukić	Dinamo Zagreb	14
6	(Bosnia and Herzegovina) Bojan Golubović	Međimurje	13
6	(Chile) Pedro Morales	Dinamo Zagreb	13
8	(Croatia) Milan Badelj	Dinamo Zagreb	11
8	(Croatia) Miljenko Mumlek	Varteks	11
8	(Bosnia and Herzegovina) Ermin Zec	Šibenik	11

== Transfers ==
- List of Croatian football transfers summer 2009
- List of Croatian football transfers winter 2009–10

== Attendances ==
#	Club	Average
1	Hajduk	4,667
2	Dinamo Zagreb	3,967
3	Cibalia	2,780
4	Karlovac	2,767
5	Osijek	2,667
6	Šibenik	2,133
7	Rijeka	2,093
8	Zadar	1,927
9	Slaven	1,620
10	Istra	1,450
11	Zagreb	1,413
12	Varteks	1,360
13	Međimurje	1,347
14	Zaprešić	1,140
15	Sesvete	603
16	Lokomotiva	460

== See also ==
- 2009–10 Croatian Football Cup
- 2009–10 Croatian Second Football League
