= Goran Jerković =

Goran Jerković may refer to:

- Goran Jerković (footballer, born 1965), retired football midfielder from Croatia
- Goran Jerković (footballer, born 1986), French football player
