= Sandi Križman =

Croatian footballer (born 1989)

Personal information
- Date of birth: 17 August 1989 (age 37)
- Place of birth: Pula, SR Croatia, SFR Yugoslavia
- Height: 1.78 m (5 ft 10 in)
- Positions: Centre forward; left winger

Team information
- Current team: Žminj

Youth career
- Žminj

Senior career*
Years	Team	Apps	(Gls)
2005–2007	Žminj	22	(7)
2007–2008	Karlovac	24	(15)
2008–2011	Rijeka	76	(9)
2012–2013	Istra 1961	55	(17)
2014–2015	Jeonnam Dragons	8	(0)
2015	Istra 1961	2	(0)
2015–2016	Slaven Belupo	19	(3)
2016–2017	Željezničar Sarajevo	11	(4)
2017	Koper	13	(4)
2017–2018	AEL	26	(5)
2018–2021	PAS Giannina	58	(17)
2021–2023	Rheindorf Altach	16	(1)
2022	Rheindorf Altach Juniors	1	(0)
2023–	Žminj		

International career
2007	Croatia U18	3	(3)
2006–2008	Croatia U19	7	(4)
2008–2009	Croatia U20	6	(0)
2008–2009	Croatia U21	3	(1)
- * Club domestic league appearances and goals as of 12 November 2022

Sandi Križman (Croatian pronunciation: [krîʒman]; born 17 August 1989) is a Croatian footballer who plays as a forward for Žminj.

== Club career ==
Born in Pula, Križman started his career in his hometown club NK Žminj, where he scored seven goals in 22 matches, aged 17. In the summer of 2007 he followed his uncle, the coach Igor Pamić to NK Karlovac, another Treća HNL team at the time. His performances there drew the attention of HNK Rijeka, with whom he signed a three-and-a-half-year contract in January 2008. He was sent back to Karlovac for the remainder of the season, scoring 15 goals in 24 league matches for the club that season. He spent the subsequent three-and-a-half years with Rijeka, scoring nine goals for the club. He had moderate success with Rijeka, leading to his transfer to Istra 1961, where he scored 7 goals in the first 13 games.

On 6 January 2014, it was officially announced that Križman joined the South Korean club Jeonnam Dragons.

On 5 February 2017, he joined Slovenian club FC Koper.

=== AEL ===
On 7 July 2017, AEL announced the signing of Križman on a three-year contract. On 30 September 2017, he scored his first goal in a 1–1 home draw against PAOK. On 22 October 2017, he scored the winner in a 1–0 away win against Platanias, which was the first in seven years. Three days later he sealed his team's 3–0 home win against Panachaiki in the domestic cup. On 9 December 2017, Križman sealed a dramatic late victory for Larissa over Xanthi, with the Croatian striker scoring the only goal of the match in the additional time. On 7 February 2018, he opened the score in a 3–2 home win against PAS Giannina, which helped his team to qualify for the semi-finals of the Greek Cup. On 1 March 2018, he scored a decisive goal in a 2–1 home win in the first leg of the semi-finals of the Greek Cup against AEK Athens.

=== PAS Giannina ===
On 26 July 2018, he joined PAS Giannina. On 25 September 2018, he scored his first goal for the team in a 2–1 away win against Atromitos in the group stages of the Greek Cup. On 29 September 2018, he scored his first Super League Greece goal for the club, opening the score in a 2–1 away loss against Panathinaikos. On 25 November 2018, Križman scored a brace as PAS Giannina secured a home win over Levadiakos at Zosimades Stadium to lift them out of the bottom section of the Super League table. With the club of Ioannina he won the 2019–20 Super League Greece 2 and got promoted to the Super League Greece, been the second top scorer with 10 goals together with Jean-Baptiste Léo, the other forward of PAS Giannina.

=== Rheindorf Altach ===
On 13 January 2023, Križman's contract with Rheindorf Altach was terminated by mutual consent.

== Honours ==
PAS Giannina

- Super League Greece 2: 2019–20

NK Karlovac

- 3.HNL – West: 2007–08

Individual

- Top scorer Super League Greece 2 Runner- Up 2019–20 (10 goals)
