= Luka Pavlović =

Luka Pavlović may refer to:

- Luka Pavlović (football) (born 1963), Croatian football manager
- Luka Pavlovic (tennis) (born 2000), French tennis player
- Luka Pavlović (writer) (1932–1982), Croatian and Bosnian and Herzegovinian writer
- Luka Pavlović (water polo), Croatian player part of the team that won the 2009 FINA U20 Water Polo World Championship
