= 2008–09 Croatian First Football League =

T-Com Prva HNL
- Season: 2008–09
- Champions: Dinamo Zagreb; 11th Croatian title 15th domestic title
- Relegated: None
- Champions League: Dinamo Zagreb
- Europa League: Hajduk Split; Rijeka; Slaven Belupo
- Matches: 198
- Goals: 522 (2.64 per match)
- Top goalscorer: Mario Mandžukić (16)
- Biggest home win: Dinamo 6–0 Cibalia
- Biggest away win: Varteks 1–6 Dinamo
- Highest scoring: Rijeka 6–2 Slaven B.
- Average attendance: 3,067

The 2008–09 Croatian First Football League (also known as 1. HNL; officially styled as T-Com Prva HNL for sponsorship reasons) was the eighteenth season of the Croatian First Football League, the national championship for men's association football teams in Croatia, since its establishment in 1992. It started on 27 July 2008 and ended on 31 May 2009. Dinamo Zagreb were the defending champions, having won their twelfth championship title the previous season, and they defended the title again, after a win against Slaven Belupo on 17 May 2009.

== Promotion and relegation ==
Međimurje were automatically relegated to Druga HNL as they finished last in the previous season, while Croatia Sesvete were automatically promoted from Druga HNL after winning the 2007–08 title. In a two-legged playoff between Inter Zaprešić and Hrvatski dragovoljac, the former kept their Prva HNL status by beating Hrvatski dragovoljac with 2–0 on aggregate (2–0, 0–0).

== League expansion ==
In June 2007 Igor Štimac, president of Association of Prva HNL clubs, proposed a future expansion of Prva HNL from 12 to 16 clubs, starting from 2008–09 season. However, although a majority of club representatives supported that proposal, no strict agreement or final decision was made. On HNS meeting in late August 2007 it was decided to postpone the decision for late 2007 or even 2008 and that the expansion would not be possible before the 2009–10 season.

For more than a year nothing explicit was stated on that matter. Finally, on a regular HNS meeting in February 2009 HNS Secretary Zorislav Srebrić stated that club licensing would decide whether the 2009–10 season would feature 12 or 16 teams. Theoretically, if only 15 teams obtained Prva HNL license, league would have featured 12 teams. The deadline for submitting the license was 1 May 2009. On 8 May 2009 HNS declared that all 19 clubs that applied for the license were awarded with it and would be in possibility to enter the league in 2009–10, now expanded to 16 clubs. Also, on 26 May 2009 HNS received official confirmations from all 19 clubs in which they expressed their will to compete in next year's Prva HNL, what means that none of the clubs would withdraw from the league. However, despite their guarantee to compete in Prva HNL, Slavonac eventually withdrew although they finished fourth and earned direct access to 2009–10 Prva HNL. Their place was taken by Međimurje while sixth-placed Hrvatski Dragovoljac competed in a relegation play-offs.

== Stadiums and locations ==
After the death of Hrvoje Ćustić during a game played at Zadar's Stanovi Stadium in March 2008, it was decided that the stadia for the 2008–09 season would have to pass a closer inspection to be deemed fit for first-league football. Since only 9 stadia managed to meet the requirements and obtain first-league license from the Croatian Football Federation, it was announced in May 2008 that some of the teams (Cibalia, Croatia Sesvete, Zadar and NK Zagreb) would have to share stadia and temporarily play their home games at other venues. Just before Round 1 kicked off, Cibalia managed to bring their stadium to standard, and in August, just before round 5, Zadar secured the licence to play their games at Stanovi Stadium.

Location of teams in 2008–09 Prva HNL

=== Stadia and personnel ===
Team	Manager^{1}	Location	Stadium	Capacity
Cibalia	(Croatia) Stanko Mršić	Vinkovci	Stadion HNK Cibalia	9,920
Croatia Sesvete	(Croatia) Milan Đuričić	Zagreb	Stadion Kranjčevićeva	8,850
Dinamo Zagreb	(Croatia) Krunoslav Jurčić	Zagreb	Stadion Maksimir	37,168
Hajduk Split	(Croatia) Ante Miše	Split	Stadion Poljud	35,000
Inter Zaprešić	(Croatia) Borimir Perković	Zagreb	Stadion ŠRC Zaprešić	4,528
Osijek	(Croatia) Tomislav Steinbrückner	Osijek	Stadion Gradski vrt	19,500
Rijeka	(Croatia) Robert Rubčić	Rijeka	Stadion Kantrida	10,275
Slaven Belupo	(Croatia) Mile Petković	Koprivnica	Gradski stadion u Koprivnici	4,000
Šibenik	(Croatia) Ivica Kalinić	Šibenik	Stadion Šubićevac	8,000
Varteks	(Croatia) Dražen Besek	Varaždin	Stadion Varteks	10,800
Zadar	(Croatia) Dalibor Zebić	Zadar	Stadion Stanovi	5,860
NK Zagreb	(Croatia) Luka Pavlović	Zagreb	Stadion Kranjčevićeva	8,850

- ^{1} On final match day of the season, played on 31 May 2009.

== Managerial changes ==
Team	Outgoing manager	Manner of departure	Date of vacancy	Replaced by	Date of appointment	Position in table
NK Zagreb	(Croatia) Miroslav Blažević	Mutual consent	10 May 2008	(Croatia) Luka Pavlović	11 May 2008	Pre-season
Dinamo Zagreb	(Croatia) Zvonimir Soldo	Resigned	14 May 2008	(Croatia) Branko Ivanković	20 May 2008	Pre-season
Slaven Belupo	(Croatia) Krunoslav Jurčić	Resigned	14 May 2008	(Croatia) Mile Petković	26 May 2008	Pre-season
Hajduk Split	(Croatia) Robert Jarni	Sacked	24 May 2008	(Croatia) Goran Vučević	25 May 2008	Pre-season
Croatia Sesvete	(Croatia) Zlatko Kranjčar	Resigned	18 June 2008	(Serbia) Ljupko Petrović	2 July 2008	Pre-season
Rijeka	(Croatia) Zlatko Dalić	Sacked	1 July 2008	(Croatia) Mladen Ivančić	7 July 2008	Pre-season
Osijek	(Croatia) Ilija Lončarević	Sacked	26 September 2008	(Croatia) Tomislav Steinbrückner	26 September 2008	10th
Zadar	(Croatia) Dalibor Zebić	Resigned	28 September 2008	(Croatia) Ivica Datković	9 October 2008	12th
Rijeka	(Croatia) Mladen Ivančić	Resigned	8 October 2008	(Croatia) Robert Rubčić	13 October 2008	7th
Inter Zaprešić	(Croatia) Milivoj Bračun	Resigned	20 October 2008	(Croatia) Borimir Perković	20 October 2008	11th
Hajduk Split	(Croatia) Goran Vučević	Resigned	26 October 2008	(Croatia) Ante Miše	21 November 2008	3rd
Cibalia	(Croatia) Srećko Lušić	Sacked	10 November 2008	(Croatia) Stanko Mršić	14 November 2008	11th
Dinamo Zagreb	(Croatia) Branko Ivanković	Mutual consent	24 November 2008	(Croatia) Marijan Vlak	24 November 2008	1st
Croatia Sesvete	(Serbia) Ljupko Petrović	Resigned	7 December 2008	(Croatia) Zlatko Kranjčar	30 December 2008	10th
Zadar	(Croatia) Ivica Datković	Mutual consent	21 December 2008	(Croatia) Dalibor Zebić	30 December 2008	12th
Croatia Sesvete	(Croatia) Zlatko Kranjčar	Resigned	21 February 2009	(Croatia) Milan Đuričić	3 May 2009	10th
Dinamo Zagreb	(Croatia) Marijan Vlak	Sacked	5 March 2009	(Croatia) Krunoslav Jurčić	5 March 2009	2nd

== League table ==
Pos	Team	Pld	W	D	L	GF	GA	GD	Pts	Qualification or relegation
1	Dinamo Zagreb (C)	33	23	5	5	71	26	+45	74	Qualification to Champions League second qualifying round
2	Hajduk Split	33	21	5	7	59	25	+34	68	Qualification to Europa League third qualifying round
3	Rijeka	33	17	5	11	50	44	+6	56	Qualification to Europa League second qualifying round
4	Slaven Belupo	33	16	7	10	46	39	+7	55	Qualification to Europa League first qualifying round (Note: Because both cup finalists, Dinamo and Hajduk, qualified for Europe through their league positions, all three UEFA Europa League spots were given to teams according to their league positions, what means that fourth-placed Slaven Belupo also earned a spot in Europa League.)
5	NK Zagreb	33	13	8	12	38	39	−1	47	
6	Šibenik	33	13	7	13	44	35	+9	46	
7	Osijek	33	10	11	12	40	41	−1	41	
8	Cibalia	33	10	8	15	33	53	−20	38	
9	Inter Zaprešić	33	9	9	15	41	50	−9	36	
10	Varteks	33	10	5	18	41	55	−14	35	
11	Zadar	33	7	8	18	28	49	−21	29	
12	Croatia Sesvete (Note: Croatia Sesvete were docked 1 point due to unpaid debts to Imotski over player Darko Vučić.) (O)	33	6	8	19	31	66	−35	25	Qualification to relegation play-off

Source: Sportnet.hr
Rules for classification: 1) points; 2) goal difference; 3) number of goals scored.
(C) Champions; (O) Play-off winners

=== Relegation play-off ===
Due to the expansion of Prva HNL to 16 clubs in the 2009–10 season, four clubs from 2008–09 Druga HNL were automatically promoted. Those should have been top four clubs, but since Slavonac withdrew their direct access spot was taken by fifth-placed Međimurje. Therefore, the 12th placed Croatia Sesvete played a two-legged relegation play-off against the 6th placed team of Druga HNL, Hrvatski Dragovoljac. Croatia Sesvete won 2–1 on aggregate and thereby earned a spot in the 2009–10 season.

==== First leg ====
11 June 2009
18:00 CEST

Hrvatski Dragovoljac	0–0	Croatia Sesvete
Ercegović (yellow card) 58' (yellow-red card) 84'	Report (in Croatian)

Stadion Maksimir, Zagreb
Attendance: 2,000
Referee: Domagoj Ljubičić (Osijek)

==== Second leg ====
14 June 2009
20:00 CEST

Croatia Sesvete	2–1	Hrvatski dragovoljac
Vojnović 10' (yellow card) 41' (yellow-red card) 62'; Čižmek 90'	Report (in Croatian)	Janjetović 67'

Stadion Kranjčevićeva, Zagreb
Attendance: 2,500
Referee: Ivan Bebek (Rijeka)

== Results ==
The schedule consisted of three rounds. During the first two rounds, each team played each other once home and away for a total of 22 matches. The pairings of the third round were then set according to the standings after the first two rounds, giving every team a third game against each opponent for a total of 33 games per team.

Home \ Away	CIB	CRS	DIN	HAJ	INT	OSI	RIJ	SLA	ŠIB	VAR	ZAD	ZAG	CIB	CRS	DIN	HAJ	INT	OSI	RIJ	SLA	ŠIB	VAR	ZAD	ZAG
Cibalia		3–1	1–1	1–1	4–3	0–3	3–1	0–0	2–0	1–0	1–0	0–1		3–0	3–4			1–1			2–1	2–1		
Croatia Sesvete	1–1		0–1	1–0	1–3	1–1	0–1	0–0	0–0	4–0	3–1	1–4			0–4		0–3	1–1			0–1	2–1		
Dinamo Zagreb	6–0	6–1		0–2	3–1	1–0	2–0	1–0	3–0	2–1	2–0	3–1					1–0	0–0	4–0	2–0			2–0	0–1
Hajduk Split	2–0	1–0	2–0		3–3	3–1	2–0	3–1	1–0	1–1	1–0	4–0	2–0	5–0	2–2						2–0	0–1		2–0
Inter Zaprešić	1–2	3–2	1–3	0–4		0–1	2–2	0–0	2–3	2–3	3–1	1–1	0–0			0–2			3–0	1–0			2–2	
Osijek	2–0	4–2	0–2	1–2	2–1		2–2	0–0	1–3	2–1	3–0	0–2				1–0	1–1		1–2	1–2			1–0	
Rijeka	1–0	2–1	1–0	3–1	0–1	0–0		2–0	0–1	2–1	2–1	0–1	2–0	3–2		2–1				6–2		4–1		2–0
Slaven Belupo	1–0	4–0	2–0	1–2	1–0	4–2	2–1		3–1	2–3	2–1	2–0	1–1	5–1		1–1					1–0	2–1		2–1
Šibenik	4–0	0–1	2–2	1–2	1–1	1–1	3–0	3–0		2–0	1–0	1–1			0–2		4–0	2–1	0–1				0–0	2–1
Varteks	3–0	2–1	0–1	0–2	1–0	0–0 (Note: The match was suspended after 82 minutes due to heavy fog. However, since more than 80% of the game was played it was officially registered with the score at the moment of suspension (0–0).)	3–3	2–3	2–1		2–0	2–1			1–6		0–1	2–3			2–2		0–0	1–2
Zadar	2–1	1–2	2–3	1–0	1–1	2–2	0–3	1–1	1–0	1–0		2–1	3–1	1–1		0–3			3–1	0–1				
NK Zagreb	0–0	1–1	2–2	3–0	0–1	2–1	1–1	2–0	0–4	0–3	0–0		4–0	0–0			1–0	1–0					3–1	

Source: Sportnet.hr
Legend: Blue = home team win; Yellow = draw; Red = away team win.

== Top goalscorers ==
Source: HRnogomet.com (in Croatian)

Rank	Player	Club	Goals
1	(Croatia) Mario Mandžukić	Dinamo Zagreb	16
2	(Croatia) Nikola Kalinić	Hajduk Split	15
3	(Croatia) Anas Sharbini	Rijeka	14
3	(Croatia) Bojan Vručina	Slaven Belupo	14
3	(Bosnia and Herzegovina) Ermin Zec	Šibenik	14
6	(Bosnia and Herzegovina) Senijad Ibričić	Hajduk Split	12
6	(Croatia) Ahmad Sharbini	Rijeka	12
8	(Croatia) Goran Mujanović	Varteks	11
8	(Croatia) Ilija Sivonjić	Inter Zaprešić / Dinamo Zagreb	11
8	(Croatia) Davor Vugrinec	NK Zagreb	11

== Transfers ==
- List of Croatian football transfers winter 2008–09

== Attendances ==
#	Club	Average
1	Hajduk	9,471
2	Dinamo Zagreb	5,892
3	Osijek	3,344
4	Šibenik	2,788
5	Cibalia	2,563
6	Rijeka	2,429
7	Zadar	2,331
8	Slaven	2,106
9	Varteks	1,926
10	Sesvete	1,397
11	Zaprešić	1,253
12	Zagreb	1,000

== See also ==
- 2008–09 Croatian Football Cup
- 2008–09 Croatian Second Football League
