= Antonio Mionić =

Croatian footballer (born 2001)

Personal information
- Date of birth: 31 May 2001 (age 25)
- Place of birth: Pula, Croatia
- Height: 1.75 m (5 ft 9 in)
- Position: Midfielder

Team information
- Current team: Karlovac
- Number: 28

Youth career
- –2018: Istra 1961
- 2018–2021: AC Milan

Senior career*
Years	Team	Apps	(Gls)
2021–2023	AC Milan	0	(0)
2021–2022	→ Montevarchi (loan)	22	(0)
2022–2023	→ Alessandria (loan)	17	(0)
2023–2025	Líšeň	39	(2)
2025–	Karlovac	31	(2)

International career
2018	Croatia U17	4	(0)
2019–2020	Croatia U19	5	(1)
- * Club domestic league appearances and goals as of 15 June 2026

Antonio Mionić (born 31 May 2001) is a Croatian professional footballer who plays as a midfielder for Karlovac.

== Club career ==
A former youth academy player of Istra 1961, Mionić moved to AC Milan in 2018. On 30 October 2019, he extended his contract with the club until June 2023.

In August 2021, Mionić joined Serie C club Montevarchi on a season long loan deal. He made his professional debut on 5 September 2021 in a 3–1 league win against Virtus Entella. In September 2022, he joined Alessandria for a one-year loan until the end of the season, with an option to be signed permanently.

On 13 August 2023, Mionić signed a contract with Czech National Football League club Líšeň.

== International career ==
Mionić was a Croatian youth international.

== Career statistics ==
As of match played 18 March 2023

Appearances and goals by club, season and competition
Club	Season	League			Cup		Continental		Total	
Club	Season	Division	Apps	Goals	Apps	Goals	Apps	Goals	Apps	Goals
AC Milan	2019–20	Serie A	0	0	0	0	0	0	0	0
AC Milan	2020–21	Serie A	0	0	0	0	0	0	0	0
Montevarchi (loan)	2021–22	Serie C	22	0	—		—		22	0
Alessandria (loan)	2022–23	Serie C	17	0	2	0	—		19	0
Career total			36	0	2	0	0	0	41	0
