= NK Zagreb 041 =

Croatian football club

Zagreb 041
- Full name: Nogometni klub Zagreb 041
- Founded: 2014
- Ground: SRC Borovje
- Capacity: 500
- Head coach: Filip Pavelić
- League: 1. Zagreb Football League
- 2025–26: 1. Zagrebačka Liga, champions
- Website: https://nkzagreb041.hr/
Home colours	Away colours

NK Zagreb 041 is a Croatian football club based in Zagreb, formed as a splinter from NK Zagreb by supporters dissatisfied with the management and direction of the original club. Established in 2014 with the involvement of the White Angels fan group, NK Zagreb 041 bills itself as "Croatia's only explicitly anti-fascist club", and is committed to social inclusion, anti-racism, anti-xenophobia, and anti-homophobia, with a focus on integrating migrants and refugees.

== History ==
NK Zagreb 041 was founded in December 2014 by supporters of NK Zagreb, primarily members of the White Angels fan group, in response to dissatisfaction with NK Zagreb's management, changes to the club's identity, and a desire for more community control over the club. The White Angels had a long history of organised support for NK Zagreb, dating back to December 1989, when they formed to help the club move from the Yugoslav Third League to the Yugoslav Second League. After interruptions due to the Yugoslav Wars in the early 1990s, the group was revived in 1992/93 by a new generation of supporters, who actively attended home and away matches and used banners and pyrotechnics to support the team.

During the mid-1990s, the White Angels' membership declined due to intimidation from the Bad Blue Boys, the ultras of GNK Dinamo Zagreb, and personal commitments of members. In the late 1990s and early 2000s, the group reorganised, founded a fan club, and later consolidated into a single association. Their activity peaked in 2002, coinciding with NK Zagreb winning the national championship, with up to 300 White Angels regularly attending home matches and around 100 attending away games. The group maintained regular support throughout the mid-2000s, including trips to European matches.

In the late 2000s, tensions arose when NK Zagreb's management changed the club's emblem and secondary colours, causing internal divisions within the White Angels. Some members aligned with management while others resisted, resulting in conflict and the departure of several long-standing fans. Despite a reduced membership of around twenty active supporters, the White Angels continued attending home and many away matches until 2014/15.

Following continued dissatisfaction with NK Zagreb’s management and the club’s identity, the White Angels helped establish NK Zagreb 041 in 2015 as a new, direct-democratic football club. The club was designed to prioritise fan involvement, operate with a non-hierarchical structure, and integrate social activism and community engagement into its ethos, continuing the legacy of the White Angels in a new organisational form.

== Supporters ==
NK Zagreb 041 have been described as "comprising anarchists, communists, refugees and anti-fascists of all stripes". The backbone of NK Zagreb 041's support came initially from the White Angels, an ultras fan group originally formed in December 1989 to support NK Zagreb. The group has a long history of organised fan activity, including attending home and away matches, creating banners, and using pyrotechnics. Over time, they have been actively involved in shaping the identity and governance of NK Zagreb 041. The supporters are guided by a set of social values that emphasise direct democracy, community involvement, and inclusivity. They prioritise fan participation in decision-making and oppose corruption, clientelism, and commercial exploitation of football. The club positions itself as an alternative space for anti-fascist, anti-racist, and pro-LGBTQ views, providing a platform for social inclusion and resistance against far-right extremism. Funding for the club comes from membership fees, donations, and fundraising.

== Organisation ==
Zagreb 041 is organised as a direct-democratic football club, giving all members equal participation in decision-making rather than relying on elected representatives. The club has no president, executive board, or traditional hierarchy. Its two main governing bodies are the Assembly, which is the highest authority approving finances, work plans, and assigning members to workgroups, and the Council, which coordinates activities between Assemblies. Decisions are generally prepared by the Council but require ratification by the Assembly, and online referendums are also used for efficiency.

Practical tasks are carried out by workgroups covering areas such as the team, logistics, administration, finance, marketing, and fan engagement. Membership in workgroups is voluntary, and all groups report to the Assembly. Permanent Council members, elected for one-year terms, hold no special authority beyond their administrative duties. The system is designed to ensure transparency, equality, and active member engagement, reducing the risks of hierarchical control or misrepresentation common in representative structures.
