= List of Croatian football transfers winter 2009–10 =

This is a list of Croatian football transfers for the 2009–10 winter transfer window. Only moves involving at least one Prva HNL club are listed.

== Transfers ==
Date	Name	Moving from	Moving to	Fee	Source
19 Nov 2009	(Montenegro) Saša Balić	(Montenegro) Grbalj	(Croatia) Inter Zaprešić	Undisclosed	
12 Dec 2009	(Hungary) Csaba Csizmadia	(Croatia) Slaven Belupo	TBD	Free transfer	
18 Dec 2009	(Belgium) Mikael Yourassowsky	(Mexico) Atlético Mexiquense	(Croatia) Rijeka	Undisclosed	
28 Dec 2009	(Brazil) Thiaguinho	(Croatia) Hajduk Split	(Brazil) Grêmio	Loan return	
28 Dec 2009	(Brazil) Rafael Paraíba	(Croatia) Hajduk Split	(Brazil) Grêmio	Loan return	
09 Jan 2010	(Brazil) Dodô	(Croatia) Inter Zaprešić	(Croatia) Dinamo Zagreb	Undisclosed	
09 Jan 2010	(Croatia) Goran Ljubojević	(Belgium) Genk	(Croatia) NK Zagreb	Free transfer	
11 Jan 2010	(Croatia) Mario Tokić	(Austria) Rapid Wien	(Croatia) NK Zagreb	Free transfer	
11 Jan 2010	(Brazil) Lucas Seguira Roche		(Croatia) NK Zagreb	Undisclosed	
12 Jan 2010	(Croatia) Filip Marčić	(Denmark) Midtjylland	(Croatia) Slaven Belupo	Free transfer	
13 Jan 2010	(Croatia) Dejan Lovren	(Croatia) Dinamo Zagreb	(France) Lyon	Undisclosed	
15 Jan 2010	(Bosnia and Herzegovina) Boško Stupić	(North Macedonia) Vardar	(Croatia) Istra 1961	Undisclosed	
15 Jan 2010	(Moldova) Gheorghe Andronic	(Moldova) Zimbru	(Croatia) Lokomotiva	Undisclosed	
15 Jan 2010	(Croatia) Krunoslav Lovrek	(Croatia) NK Zagreb	(Croatia) Lokomotiva	Undisclosed	
21 Jan 2010	(Greece) Dimitrios Papadopoulos	(Croatia) Dinamo Zagreb	(Spain) Celta Vigo	Free transfer	
27 Jan 2010	(Croatia) Marko Grgić	(Croatia) NK Zagreb	(Croatia) Međimurje	Undisclosed	
27 Jan 2010	(Croatia) Marko Grgić	(Croatia) NK Zagreb	(Croatia) Međimurje	Undisclosed	
27 Jan 2010	(North Macedonia) Vlade Lazarevski	(Ukraine) Karpaty Lviv	(Croatia) Rijeka	Free transfer	
28 Jan 2010	(Croatia) Bojan Vručina	(Croatia) Slaven Belupo	(Israel) Hapoel Tel Aviv	300,000 Euro	
Jan 2010	(Croatia) Ivan Turina	(Croatia) Dinamo Zagreb	(Poland) Lech Poznań	Free transfer	
Jan 2010	(Croatia) Slobodan Stranatić	(Croatia) Osijek	(Croatia) Istra 1961	Undisclosed	
Jan 2010	(Kosovo) Gjergj Bushaj	(Kosovo) Vëllaznimi	(Croatia) Istra 1961	Undisclosed	
Jan 2010	(Croatia) Pero Pejić	(Austria) Kapfenberg	Croatia Sesvete	Free transfer	
Jan 2010	(Croatia) Ivan Banović	(Croatia) Međimurje	Croatia Sesvete	Free transfer	
Jan 2010	(Croatia) Matija Katanec	Croatia Sesvete	(Slovenia) ND Gorica	Undisclosed	
22 Jan 2010	(Croatia) Marin Ljubičić	(Croatia) Zadar	(Croatia) Hajduk Split	Undisclosed	
28 Jan 2010	(Bosnia and Herzegovina) Edin Šaranović	(Croatia) Zadar	(Bosnia and Herzegovina) Olimpik Sarajevo	Free transfer	
28 Jan 2010	(Croatia) Josip Kvesić	(Slovakia) MŠK Žilina	(Croatia) Varteks	Free transfer	
Jan 2010	(Bosnia and Herzegovina) Ante Serdarušić	(Germany) Greuther Fürth	Croatia Sesvete	Free transfer	
Feb 2010	(Croatia) Josip Knežević	(Croatia) Osijek	(Russia) Amkar Perm	500,000 Euro	
Feb 2010	(Brazil) Carlos	(Croatia) Dinamo Zagreb	(China) Shandong Luneng	500,000 Euro	
