= NK Zagorec Krapina =

Croatian football club

Nk Zagorec Krapina
- Full name: Nogometni Klub Zagorec Krapina
- Founded: 1908
- Ground: SRC Podgora
- Capacity: 1360
- Chairman: Damir Belošević
- Manager: Damir Petravić
- League: 3. HNL Sjever
Home colours	Away colours

Nogometni Klub Zagorec Krapina (English: Football Club Zagorec Krapina) is a Croatia football club based in the town of Krapina. The club was founded in 1908. They play their home matches at Stadion ŠRC Podgora.

Zagorec is the most successful club in Zagorje County, having played five consecutive seasons in the Croatian Second League (2HNL) from 1995 to 2000. The "golden era" of the club was in the 1997–1998 season, when they finished third, winning a place in the qualification playoffs for the 1HNL. They were placed in the second qualification group along with Nk Cibalia Vinkovci and Rnk Split. However, after a win and a draw Cibalia qualified above them.

== Trophies ==
Cup NSKZŽ 2011–2012.

Cup NSKZŽ 2012–2013.

Cup NSKZŽ 2017–2018.

Cup NSKZŽ 2018–2019.

1. ŽNL KRAPINSKO ZAGORSKA 2012–2013.

== Recent seasons ==
Season	League								
Season	Division	Uta	Pob	Neo	Izg	Gol+	Gol-	Bod	Poz
1992	3. HNL Skupina B	14	6	0	8	19	17	12	7
1992./1993.	3. HNL Središte (ZG regija)	34	17	4	13	79	70	38	6
1993./1994.	3. HNL Sjever (Zagrebačka regija)	30	14	5	11	60	32	33	7
1995./1996.	3. HNL Zapad	34	19	8	7	85	32	65	3 ↑
1996./1997	1.B HNL	30	12	6	12	51	42	42	9
1997./1998.	2. HNL Središte	32	21	7	4	79	20	70	2 ↑
1997./1998.	Kvalifikacije za 1. HNL, prvi krug – Skupina 2	2	1	1	0	3	2	4	2 ↓
1998./1999.	2. HNL	36	15	6	15	50	55	51	9
1999./2000.	2. HNL	32	5	7	20	24	63	22	16 ↓
2000./2001.	3. HNL Središte	30	6	8	16	28	49	26	13
2001./2002.	3. HNL Središte	30	15	3	12	47	38	48	6
2002./2003.	3. HNL Središte	30	11	4	15	27	32	37	13
2003./2004.	3. HNL Središte	30	12	11	7	48	36	47	4
2004./2005.	3. HNL Središte	32	12	4	16	41	47	40	13
2005./2006.	3. HNL Središte	30	15	6	9	54	35	51	5
2006./2007.	3. HNL Središte	34	13	4	17	52	58	43	16 ↓
2007./2008.	4. HNL Središte	29	12	7	10	38	35	43	7
2008./2009.	4. HNL Središte	30	13	2	15	47	47	41	9
2009./2010.	4. HNL Središte	30	12	7	11	51	40	43	9
2010./2011.	4. HNL Središte	30	11	2	17	32	59	35	12
2011./2012.	4. HNL Središte	30	12	4	14	53	52	40	9
2012./2013.	1. ŽNL Krapinsko zagorska	26	20	4	2	92	22	64	1 ↑
2013./2014.	3. HNL Središte	30	16	6	8	54	39	54	5
2014./2015.	3. HNL Središte	30	11	8	11	43	44	41	7
2015./2016.	3. HNL Zapad	30	15	3	12	40	35	48	6
2016./2017.	3. HNL Zapad	30	9	5	16	37	59	32	14
2017./2018.	3. HNL Zapad	34	17	4	13	64	56	55	5
2018./2019.	3. HNL Zapad	28	11	5	12	46	44	38	9
2019./2020.	3. HNL Središte	18	9	5	4	32	33	32	4

== Fans ==
During the 1990s Nk Zagorec was the most popular club in Zagorje County. The "Šumski gujdeki" fan group enthusiastically supported the team during both home and away games. At the end of the 90s, the group had fallen apart.

== Stadium ==
Universiade in Zagreb 1987. enable to build the "ŠRC Podgora" stadium, which includes a main football pitch, athletics track and an auxiliary field. In addition to the main playground, there were stands with a total of 1,360 seats and a building with four dressing rooms, toilets, and catering facilities. In 2015, there was a complete reconstruction of the stands, new seats were replaced, and the existing and new roof was built, which covers about 200 people. By changing the leadership of the club in 2017, the first reconstruction phase of the locker room was finished, and the clubhouse roof was changed.

== Squad (2023) ==
As of 6 February 2023

Note: Flags indicate national team as defined under FIFA eligibility rules; some limited exceptions apply. Players may hold more than one non-FIFA nationality.

No.	Pos.	Nation	Player
3	DF	CRO	Mario Matković
5		CRO	Patrik Braun
6	MF	CRO	Patrik Jug
7	DF	CRO	Luka Vinski
8		CRO	Mohamed Sanogo
9	FW	CRO	Matija Smrekar
10	MF	CRO	Matija Majcenić
11		CRO	Karlo Stiperski
12	GK	CRO	Matija Bruči
13		CRO	Luka Topolovec

No.	Pos.	Nation	Player
14	DF	CRO	Mark Karković
15		CRO	Filip Kovačić
16		CRO	Marko Brčić
17		CRO	Peter Chikola
19	FW	CRO	Andrej Landripet
20	MF	NGA	Chukwu Chikwado Elijah
22	FW	CRO	Petar Bračević
29		CRO	Mario Cetina
33		CRO	Dario Frinčić
77	GK	CRO	Dani Vinceljak
