= Damir Petravić =

Croatian footballer and manager

Personal information
- Date of birth: 17 July 1963 (age 63)
- Place of birth: Zagreb, SR Croatia, SFR Yugoslavia

Team information
- Current team: Zagorec Krapina (manager)

Senior career*
Years	Team	Apps	(Gls)
1994–1996	Istra Pula	12	(0)

Managerial career
- 2003–2004: NK Zagreb
- 2005: Polet Buševec
- 2006–2007: Polet Buševec
- 2007–2008: Vinogradar
- 2008: Polet Buševec
- 2008: Hrvatski Dragovoljac
- 2008–2009: Segesta
- 2009–2011: Gorica
- 2011: Karlovac
- 2012: Žalgiris Vilnius
- 2013: Šibenik
- 2013–2014: Cibalia
- 2014: Šibenik
- 2015: Vinogradar
- 2015: Lučko
- 2022-: Zagorec Krapina
- * Club domestic league appearances and goals

Damir Petravić (born 17 July 1963) is a Croatian professional football manager and former player who is currently the manager of Zagorec Krapina.

== Playing career ==
During his career, he played for NK Zagreb, Šibenik and Istra Pula. Petravić graduated on the Faculty of Physical Education at the University of Zagreb.

== Managerial career ==
He coached all youth categories of NK Zagreb, before taking over the first team. He also coached Hrvatski Dragovoljac, Vinogradar, Segesta, Gorica and Karlovac.

After NK Zagreb sacked Zlatko Kranjčar in September 2003, his assistant Petravić took over the first team for the next match. On 1 October 2003, he was appointed as full-time manager until the end of season. After his spell at NK Zagreb ended in March 2004 when he was replaced by Milivoj Bračun, Petravić joined fourth-tier club Polet Buševec in the role of technical advisor before being appointed joint manager with Nino Matković in the second part of the season. In September 2005, he resigned as manager. However, he returned to Polet again in January 2006 and the following season club achieved promotion to Treća HNL. In June 2007, Petravić received an offer from Vinogradar and after consultation with the club terminated his contract by mutual consent. In January 2008, he was considered to coach Croatia Sesvete but the job went to Ljupko Petrović and Petravić returned for the third time to Polet. After a successful period at Polet, Petravić accepted an offer from Hrvatski Dragovoljac in June 2008.

In October 2008, Petravić was appointed as manager of Segesta after Srećko Bogdan left the club by mutual consent. After three successive defeats, Petravić openly criticized the board due to their lack of support and went in strike with several players. He was sacked as manager in April 2009. Petravić then took over the helm of Gorica in Treća HNL and managed to secure two successive promotions for the club. However, Gorica didn't got a license for competing in the top division. In September 2011, it was announced that Petravić was appointed as manager of Karlovac. On the last day of 2011, Petravić announced his resignation citing dissatisfaction with the current situation at the club and unpaid wages. Several days later, Petravić took over the helm of Lithuanian club Žalgiris Vilnius. In May 2012, Žalgiris won the 2011–12 Lithuanian Football Cup after defeating Ekranas in the final 3–1 in a penalty shoot-out after a scoreless draw in regular time. In the second qualifying round of 2012–13 UEFA Europa League, Žalgiris were eliminated with an aggregate score 6–2 by the Austrian side Admira. In August 2012, Petravić resigned from his position after a 2–2 draw with Sūduva, leaving the team at the second position eight points behind Ekranas.

In April 2013, Petravić took over as a manager of Šibenik, Croatian team playing in Druga HNL. Šibenik finished fourth but were denied a license for competing in Druga HNL for the following season and were demoted to the third level. In August 2013, Petravić left Šibenik and joined Cibalia. In March 2014, Petravić was sacked after a 1–0 home defeat against Lučko which saw them losing the first place. In September 2014, Petravić returned to Šibenik.
