= Dalibor Zebić =

Croatian footballer and manager

Personal information
- Date of birth: 4 February 1972 (age 54)
- Place of birth: Split, SFR Yugoslavia
- Height: 1.92 m (6 ft 3 1/2 in)
- Position: Defender

Senior career*
Years	Team	Apps	(Gls)
- Poljičanin Srinjine
1994–1996	Primorac Stobreč	38	(5)
1996	NK Zagreb	1	(0)
1996–1999	Zadarkomerc	67	(3)
1999–2001	Osijek	31	(0)
2001–2005	Zadar	84	(2)

Managerial career
- 2005–2006: Zadar (assistant)
- 2006–2008: Zadar
- 2008–2012: Zadar
- * Club domestic league appearances and goals

Dalibor Zebić (born 4 February 1972) is a Croatian professional football manager and former player.

== Club career ==
Zebić began his playing career in the fourth-tier club Poljičanin from Srinjine, and eventually moved to Primorac Stobreč where he spent two years. After a short spell at NK Zagreb, he joined Zadarkomerc in 1996. Following their relegation from Prva HNL in 1999, he joined Osijek. After Zadar returned to the top flight in the 2001–02 season, Zebić returned and played there until 2005 when he was forced to retire due to injury.

== Managerial career ==
After his retirement, Zebić was appointed an assistant manager at Zadar. In April 2006, he took over the first team after Predrag Jurić was sacked. The team finished at the 7th place in the south division group of Druga HNL. The following season in the united Druga HNL, Zadar finished second and enter the promotion play-off. They won promotion after defeating Pula 5–2 on aggregate. In September 2008, Zebić resigned after a disappointing start in the season and winning only one point from nine matches. After Ivica Datković terminated his contract in December 2008, Zebić again returned to Zadar and managed to avoid relegation. In the 2009–10 season, Zadar finished in the 12th place, one point clear of relegation zone. In the following two seasons, Zadar finished in the 10th place. In September 2012, Zebić resigned after a 5–1 home defeat to Inter Zaprešić, leaving the team in the 11th place without a win in nine matches.

In November 2014, Zebić was named as chairman of Zadar after the club was converted to sports joint-stock company. The following month, Zebić resigned from position.
