= Gordan Ciprić =

Croatian footballer (born 1965)

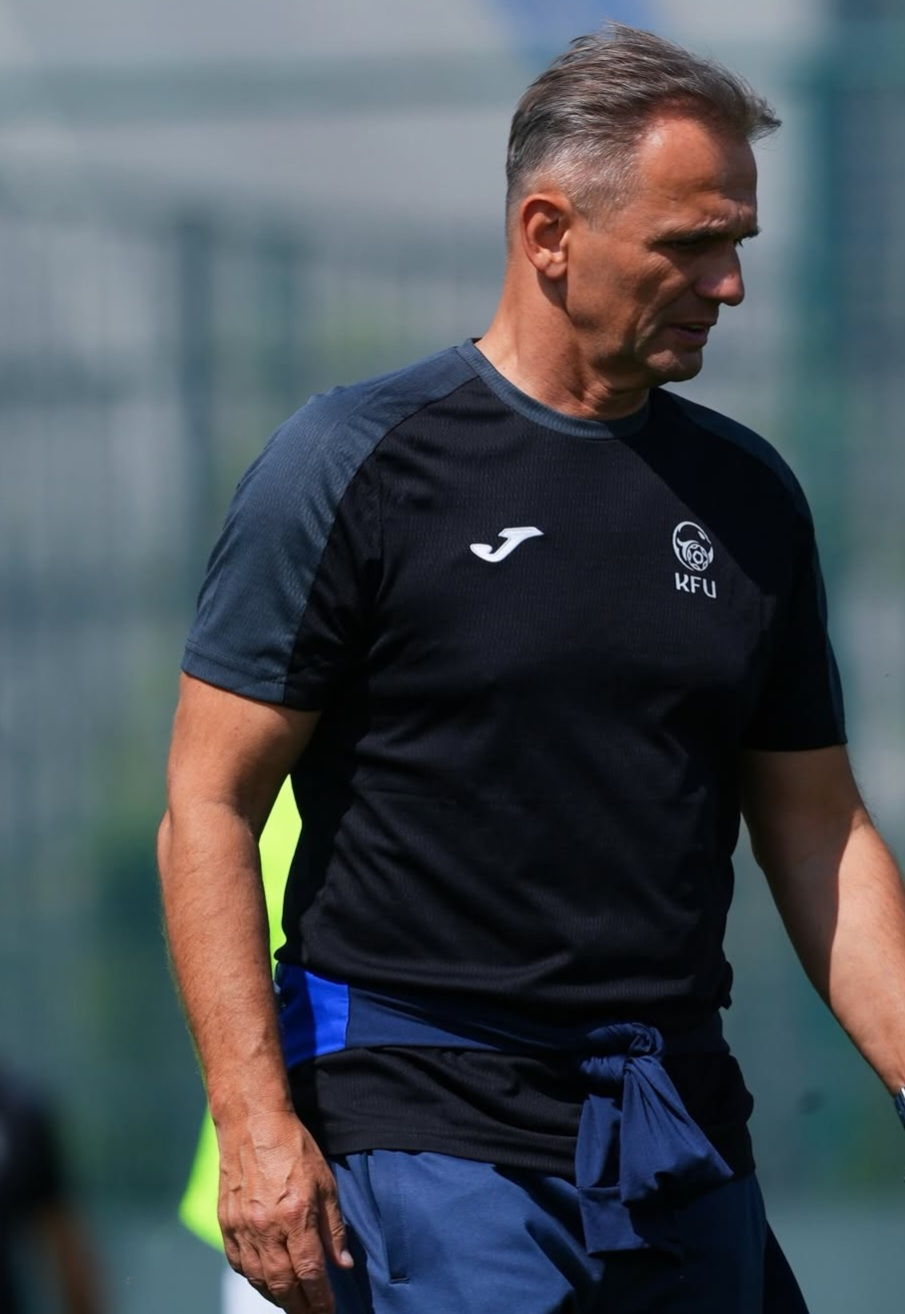
- Cipric in 2026.

Personal information
- Date of birth: 30 March 1965 (age 61)
- Place of birth: Zagreb, SFR Yugoslavia
- Height: 1.77 m (5 ft 10 in)
- Position: Midfielder

Team information
- Current team: Kyrgyzstan (assistant)

Youth career
- Dinamo Zagreb
- Hajduk Split

Senior career*
Years	Team	Apps	(Gls)
1983–1984	Šibenik		
1984–1986	NK Zagreb		
1986	HAŠK		
1986–1988	UR Namur		
1988	Borussia Wuppertal		
1988–1989	Metalac Osijek		
1989–1990	VfB Bad Rappenau		
1991–1993	Inker Zaprešić		
1993–1995	FSV Wacker Nordhausen		
1995–1997	Eintracht Sondershausen		

Managerial career
- 1998–1999: Dinamo Zagreb U17
- 1999–2000: Dinamo Zagreb U18
- 2003–2004: Dinamo Zagreb (assistant)
- 2004–2005: Slaven Belupo (assistant)
- 2005–2006: HAŠK
- 2006–2007: Hrvatski Dragovoljac
- 2009–2011: NK Zagreb (assistant)
- 2010–2011: Croatia U21 (assistant)
- 2011–2012: NK Zagreb
- 2012–2014: Kayserispor (assistant)
- 2014–2017: Azerbaijan (assistant)
- 2018–2019: Bosnia and Herzegovina (assistant)
- 2019–2020: Kayserispor (assistant)
- 2020: Denizlispor (assistant)
- 2022: Olimpija Ljubljana (assistant)
- 2023: Rudeš (assistant)
- 2024–2025: Montenegro (assistant)
- 2025–2026: Kyrgyzstan (assistant)
- * Club domestic league appearances and goals

Gordan Ciprić (Croatian pronunciation: [ɡǒrdan tsǐpritɕ]; born 30 March 1965) is a Croatian football manager and former player.

Born in Zagreb, Ciprić graduated from the Faculty of Kinesiology.

== Playing career ==
Ciprić played youth football for Dinamo Zagreb and Hajduk Split. In his senior career, he played for Šibenik, NK Zagreb, HAŠK, UR Namur, Borussia Wuppertal, Metalac Osijek, VfB Bad Rappenau, Inker Zaprešić, FSV Wacker Nordhausen, and Eintracht Sondershausen.

Ciprić also won a prominent minifootball tournament "Kutija Šibica" in 1989, playing together with Zvonimir Boban and Robert Prosinečki for minifootball club Termotehna Šela.

== Coaching career ==
As manager, Ciprić led the Dinamo Zagreb youth team, Hrvatski Dragovoljac, HAŠK, and NK Zagreb. As assistant, he worked at Dinamo Zagreb, Croatia U21, NK Zagreb, Slaven Belupo, Kayserispor, Azerbaijan national team, Bosnia and Herzegovina national team, Denizlispor, Olimpija Ljubljana, Rudeš, Montenegro national team and Kyrgyzstan national football team.

He was also the personal coach of footballer Robert Prosinečki when he was playing at Portsmouth and Standard Liège. From 2007 to 2012, he served as a scout of the Croatia national football team. He has also worked with many Croatian coaches such as Slaven Bilić, Ivo Šušak, and Nikola Jurčević.

On 15 October 2012, it was confirmed that he would be the assistant manager of Prosinečki at Kayserispor. After leaving Kayserispor, he was appointed on 4 December 2014 as the assistant of Prosinečki at the Azerbaijan national team. On 27 October 2017, Prosinečki left the Azerbaijan national team together with his assistants.

In January 2018, he was appointed as the assistant of Prosinečki at the Bosnia and Herzegovina national team. On 27 November 2019 it was confirmed that Prosinečki and his assistants would leave the national team after mutual agreement with the Football Association of Bosnia and Herzegovina.

In December 2019, he was named the assistant manager of Prosinečki at Turkish Super Lig club Kayserispor. This was his second appointment at the club, as he was previously also the assistant of Prosinečki at Kayserispor from 2012 to 2014. In August 2020, Prosinečki decided not to extend his contract with Kayserispor due to the club's transfer policy for next season, so he and his assistants left the club.

In August 2020, four days after leaving Kayserispor, he was named the assistant manager of Prosinečki at Turkish Super Lig club Denizlispor. On 24 November, he left Denizlispor together with Prosinečki after his resignation.

In March 2022, he was named assistant manager to Prosinečki at Slovenian PrvaLiga club Olimpija Ljubljana.

In February 2024, he and Prosinečki took charge of the Montenegro national team. In December 2025 he was appointed as assistant manager to Robert Prosinečki at Kyrgyzstan national team.

In September 2026, at the invitation of Slaven Bilić, he joined the Croatian national football team as a scout. He had previously held the same position during Bilić’s first tenure, from 2007 to 2012.
