= NK Zagreb =

Croatian football club

Coordinates: 45.788770°N 15.957979°E

- Full name: Nogometni klub Zagreb (Zagreb Football Club)
- Nicknames: Zagrebaši; Pjesnici (The Poets); Pogorelci (The Smolders); Bijeli (The Whites)
- Short name: ZAG
- Founded: 1908; 118 years ago as HŠK Zagreb
- Ground: Nogometni centar ZAGREBello
- Capacity: 1,000
- President: Dražen Medić
- League: 4. NL Središte Zagreb podskupina A
- Website: www.nkzagreb.hr
Home colours	Away colours	Third colours

Nogometni klub Zagreb (Zagreb Football Club), commonly known as NK Zagreb or simply Zagreb (pronounced [zâːɡreb]), is a Croatian football club based in the capital city of Zagreb. It currently competes in the fifth tier league competition of Croatian football league system, Četvrta nogometna liga Središte Zagreb podskupina A in Croatian (Fourth football league Region Zagreb division A) since the 2021–22 season and the revision of league in preparation for structure reorganization in a men's league system of Croatian football league system starting from 2022–23 which also led to labeling changes for the league levels.

The club was founded in 1908 as HŠK Zagreb, meaning Hrvatski športski klub Zagreb (Croatian Athletic Club Zagreb). After World War II NK Zagreb had a considerable success in former Yugoslavia being enlisted as a notable club (at least 10 top-flight seasons or at least one title) in the Yugoslav First League. Zagreb played a total of 18 seasons in the top flight before league got disintegrated in 1991 with only Croatian big teams Hajduk, Dinamo and Rijeka achieving more competitive seasons. The biggest achievement in that period happened in 1964–65 season when Zagreb finished 6th under the management of coach Gustav Lechner and contribution of an all-time club legend, prolific forward Zlatko Dračić, a league top goalscorer.

From 1992 to 2016 Zagreb played in top division of Croatian football then known as Prva hrvatska nogometna liga (Croatian First Football League), short Prva HNL or 1.HNL or simply HNL as a founding club member with the exception of 2013–14 season. The greatest accomplishment in Croatian football came in 2001–02 season. Under the guidance of manager Zlatko Kranjčar, against all odds, NK Zagreb surprisingly won the championship, with club's young striker Ivica Olić securing a title of league top goalscorer. It was the first time since its establishment in 1992 and, by some accounts, the first time in 57 years that the Croatian champion was not Dinamo Zagreb or Hajduk Split, an achievement that was repeated only once, 15 years later by HNK Rijeka.

Another rarity that Zagreb achieved in the Croatian football happened in 2013–14 season when they promptly won Croatian Second Football League, thus becoming the only football club in Croatia to ever hold titles in both first and second division. Zagreb were also finalist of 1997 Croatian Football Cup and finalist of Croatian Football Super Cup in 2002.

In October 2018, after eviction from their historical home venue, Stadion u Kranjčevićevoj, NK Zagreb is using their training camp ZAGREBello with an approximate capacity of 1,000 as a home ground for its official fixtures, which is located in Veslačka street. The team's traditional home colours are white shirts, shorts and socks, which is the reason why they are referred to as Bijeli in Croatian, meaning "The Whites". Another popular nickname of the club is "The Poets", Pjesnici in Croatian, due to their former location of home ground at Kranjčevićeva street, which is named after Croatian poet Silvije Strahimir Kranjčević and became a well-known phrase "club from the street of poet", that was often used by the popular radio sports commentator Ivo Tomić for NK Zagreb when broadcasting football matches. The less known, outmoded nickname Pogorelci, roughly translated as "The Smolders" formed in 1978 as a result of blazing fire which obliterated Zagreb's stadium, is being used once again to refer and describe the present-day state of affairs at the club.

Although NK Zagreb is currently competing in the fifth tier of Croatian Football League, it competed in the top-level as a founding member of First Croatian Football League for 24 seasons until 2016 (with an exception of 2013–14 season), when the club was relegated from first division for its second and the last time. From 2009–10 season due to non-existence of club board, lack of income and sponsorship, poor management skills and unprofessional behavior of its president, by the end of next decade club faced three relegation drops in four seasons, loss of professional status, loss of its traditional home ground and loss of its supporters. For a long period of time, in particular from the 1950s to 2010s, NK Zagreb was the second strongest and famous football club in city of Zagreb and by far the most famous football club in Trešnjevka neighbourhood. Also, NK Zagreb participated several times in the European competitions like UEFA Champions League (2), UEFA Cup Winners' Cup (4), UEFA Intertoto Cup (10) and Inter-Cities Fairs Cup (10).

== History ==
=== Foundation thesis ===
==== PNIŠK misconception ====
The club was inaccurately considered to be founded in 1903 as PNIŠK (Prvi nogometni i športski klub, translated First Football and Athletic Club), being one of the first to be formed in Croatia. First secretary was Dragutin Baki, the president was Vilhelm Witte, and the captain of the team and instructor was Czech Jan Todl. Since there weren't any clubs to play with, the first official match was played between the club's players divided into two groups in 1904. Ticket income from the match was 3 krone and 3 filers.

The first international match was played in 1905 against Hungarian champions Ferencváros on Magyar Athletikai Club's pitch. The home team won with a high 11–1 score. The players who played for Zagreb were: Filipčić, Schwarz, Todl, Mutefelija, Slavnič, Ugrinić, Polivka, Uhrl, Višinger, Koruna, and Torbić.

According to sports historians, the history of the club can be linked only to beginnings in 1908 and 1910 with the founding of Hrvatski športski klub Zagreb (Croatian Athletic Club Zagreb) and Hrvatski tipografski športski klub Zagreb (Croatian Typographic Athletic Club Zagreb), while some see the roots of the club in the founding of Športski klub Zagreb, (Athletic Club Zagreb) in 1919.

==== Post-WWII restitution ====
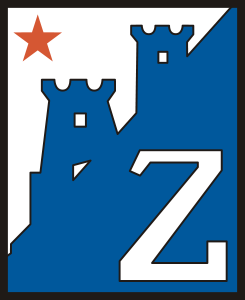
Crest of Fizkulturno društvo Zagreb used in post-WWII era

After the Second World War, Fizkulturno društvo Zagreb (Zagreb Sports Society) or short FD Zagreb was established on 10 October 1946 by merging newly founded local clubs Sloboda and Tekstilac with re-established Amater and Grafičar. Among them, Grafičar was the club with the biggest reputation and results dating back to 1908 when it was founded under the name Hrvatski (tipografski) športski klub Zagreb (Croatian (Typographic) Athletic Club Zagreb).

In 1950, FD Zagreb changed its name to present-day Nogometni klub Zagreb. On 7 February 1952 decision was made for the First Division team Borac Zagreb (ex Milicioner Zagreb) to integrate with Nogometni klub Zagreb who was at the time a second-tier club not able to secure a promotion in newly formed Yugoslav football league system. NK Zagreb continued to bear its name, acquiring so, a license for the upcoming first division season that was scheduled to start in less than a month.

On 9 August 1960 club was once again reunited with NK Grafičar (renovated in 1949) and accepted the adjective "Grafički" to its full name Grafički nogometni klub Zagreb. The adjective was soon dropped out of everyday usage and was eventually abandoned. In 1980, NK Zagreb merged with local side NK Zagrebački plavi (which was previously called NK Jedinstvo) from west Trnje neighborhood, whose playground in Veslačka street eventually became Zagreb's training camp and later on, home venue named ZAGREBello.

=== Yugoslav football league system ===
During the Yugoslav era, NK Zagreb played a total of 18 seasons in the First Football League of Yugoslavia. The seasons were: 1952, 1952–53, 1954–55, 1955–56, 1956–57, 1957–58, 1964–65, 1965–66, 1966–67, 1967–68, 1968–69, 1969–70, 1973–74, 1976–77, 1977–78, 1978–79, 1980–81 and 1981–82. The greatest success in that period was in the 1964–65 season when NK Zagreb won 6th place under coach Gustav Lechner and with a prolific forward Zlatko Dračić who became top scorer with 23 goals in 26 league appearances. Along with Zlatko Dračić several other prominent players of NK Zagreb in the 1960s were: Darko Stanišić, Mladen Wacha, Stanko Bubanj and Mladen Azinović.

One of the most notable matches Zagreb played was the "Great drama in Maksimir" on 19 July 1973 when a qualifying match between NK Zagreb and NK Osijek took place on Maksimir stadium. It was a second leg of two qualifying matches for entering the First League. The first leg was played in city of Osijek and ended up in a drew, 0–0. Although Zagreb was the better opponent throughout the whole match, they failed to secure a goal in front of 25,000 spectators. The second leg was played in Maksimir because of great ticket demand – the attendance was 64,138 which broke the stadium record and stands to this day. The game saw dramatic comeback from NK Zagreb making it a 2–2 draw at the full time whistle. Zagreb achieved promotion after a penalty shootout which ended with a 4–3 score in favor of Zagreb. Zagreb's celebration started after a crucial penalty kick was converted by late substitute, forward Hajrudin "Prika" Hušidić. Zagreb team lineup for this match was:

Horvat, Gašparini, Tucak, Antolić, Ivanišević, Lipovac (Bakota), Čopor, Močibob (Hušidić), Rukljač, Markulin, Smolek.

Another notable match Zagreb played is also a qualification match held in June 1985. NK Zagreb, after being relegated from Yugoslav Second League West in 1983–84 season, promptly won their corresponding North division of Croatian Republic Football League in 1984–85 season. At Kranjčević Street venue in front of 15000 gathered supporters Zagreb team led by Kurbaša and Petravić generation achieved magnificent 4–1 win against West division winner NK Orijent in a semi-final match played for Second League West division promotion, but in the end failed to finish qualification campaign victorious by losing the finals to South division winner NK Zadar on penalties. For next two seasons Zagreb repeated the same success by winning their North division titles in 1985–86 and 1986–87, but in both occasions failed to secure a promotion to Second League in the last stage of finals against Mladost Petrinja and Šparta Beli Manastir.

=== Croatian football league system ===
NK Zagreb competed in the First Croatian Football League from the very beginning in 1992 as a league founder till the end of 2012–13 season when they got relegated to the Second Croatian Football League for the first time. After promptly winning the title in second division, Zagreb returned and managed to play two more (2014–15, 2015–16) seasons in top level of Croatian football before irretrievably plunging into overall deterioration which in the end led to up-to-date situation.

Zagreb is the first club to break the dominance of Dinamo and Hajduk in Croatian football. It happened in 2001–02 season and was the first Croatian club after 57 years to be a national champion without being Hajduk Split or Dinamo Zagreb. Credit for that success goes to team head coach Zlatko "Cico" Kranjčar and very much his standardized lineup for the season. Among most notable players was club's best goalscorer of the season Ivica Olić who led the club to its first (and last) championship of the Prva HNL with 21 goals scored in 29 appearances. Olić was also entitled with league Best player and Best goalscorer award.

The main eleven line up for triumphal team who carried out the achievement was: Vladimir Vasilj, Goran Stavrevski, Vedran Ješe, Ivica Pirić, Josip Bulat, Dalibor Poldrugač, Damir Milinović, Ibrahim Duro, Admir Hasančić, Ivica Olić and Antonio Franja. Merits must also be given to rotation players: Petar Krpan, Hrvoje Štrok, Nermin Šabić, Frane Ćaćić, Domagoj Verhas, Mario Osibov, Emir Spahić, Mario Tadić, Krunoslav Lovrek and Predrag Šimić.

Also worth mentioning here is Joško Popović who played for NK Zagreb in the 1990s, 4th all-time top scorer ever in Prva HNL. Zagreb also had best league goalscorer on four occasions: Mate Baturina in 1997–98 with 18 goals scored, already mentioned Ivica Olić in 2001–02 with 21 goals, Davor Vugrinec in 2009–10 scored 18 and Ivan Krstanović in next season, 2010–11 managed to came at top with 19 league goals scored.

Zagreb's final honorable achievements in Prva HNL before the downfall were in the 2004–05 and 2006–07 season when they finished 3rd overall and in the 2007–08 season when they reached semi-finals of the Croatian Cup.

=== Name changes ===
- Hrvatski športski klub Zagreb (1908 – June 1912)
- Hrvatski tipografski športski klub Zagreb (June 1912 – July 1918)
- Športski klub Plamen (July 1919 – 1920)
- Športski klub Zagreb (1920 – June 1941)
- Fiskulturno društvo Zagreb (10 October 1946 – 1950)
- Nogometni klub Zagreb (1950–8 August 1960)
- Grafički nogometni klub Zagreb (9 August 1960 – 1961)
- Nogometni klub Zagreb (1961–present)

=== Downfall ===
==== 2015 players strike ====
In August 2015 Zagreb players declared strike and refused training practice in preparation for the 5th round and away game against RNK Split bringing in question the game itself and so on the regularity of Prva HNL which was already seriously shattered. The club was in debt, players not receiving wages for six months. Zagreb president Dražen Medić had several offers for players that would at least somewhat stabilized the situation in the first division club from Kranjčevićeva, but refused them all. Strike was ongoing for a week ahead of matchday with players demanding to be paid at least partially.

==== 2017 relegation ====
During 13 years of his presidency, club president Dražen Medić has been criticised for the poor performance of the club. As the president, coach, director, and manager, he was seen as a gatekeeper under the protection of Mayor Milan Bandić, and replaced the opposing forces at the club with like-minded people. With the financial support perishing from the city treasury, underachieving sport results, and overall poor income accumulation, Medić renounced his former friend, financial patron, entrepreneur associate and acting Mayor Milan Bandić by the end of 2016. While the city imposed a three-year ban on Medić from performing any duty in sports, Medić continued serving as an advisor to NK Zagreb. Critics considered the lack of media attention and public engagement to be the main reason behind Medić's takeover, and expressed concerns over the future performance of the club.

In the 2016–17 Second Football League season, NK Zagreb was relegated again to the third division.

==== 2017–18 season ====
A debut season at Third Football League Division West was not what Zagreb hoped for. They were unable to prove competitive to top division clubs, let alone to achieve promotion. Unbelievable scenes in Zagreb were a common thing under Medić ruling. One of which was Medić verbal conflict of foul words during an official match with Zagreb's player, academy product, long term first division player and captain with more than 200 league appearances for Zagreb, Josip Jurendić, who joined Zagreb only few months earlier from first division side RNK Split in attempt to help his beloved club achieve a comeback promotion in 2017–18 season. Confronting clash resulted in Jurendić leaving the club after 10 matches played. Opinion of Zagreb successful return to Second Croatian Football League was gone. After Jurendić incident, mediocre play in the end saw them finish at mid-table in 9th place despite having one of best players and goalscorers of division Filip Matijasević, scoring 17 goals.

Due to rapidly deteriorating financial situation club was forced to implement a mandatory membership fee for all the children and youth sections who trained in Zagreb's football academy ending so a long positive practice of last membership free football academy. And yet the academy and youth team coaches who worked with children were known to be on up to a 6-month paycheck delays. Incline in budget deficit resulted in both quantity and quality of training processes, number of youth teams and coaches, failing so in Academy's prime purpose for which it was widely famous, providing a quality first team players. Club was also weakened due to administration abandonment, without a proper replacements for a positions such as technical director, secretary, economist, etc.

==== 2018 ban ====
The Head of City Control Office, after anonymous reports of irregularities occurring at the club in 2017–18, ordered an inspection of NK Zagreb. The Sports inspection survey found irregular activities in the work of football club and immediately banned Dražen Medić from performing all duties in sports for a period of three years. In July 2018, Medić appeal to the Central State Office for Sports was rejected making a decision final. Due to official secrecy, details of irregularities in the work and basis on which Medić was banned from the sport have not been made public. However, without the consequences, Medić continued to lead the club through the finish of the 2017–18 season and continue so even in pre-season preparations for their second Third division season in 2018–19 with his faithful companion by his side since 2015, club coach Dražen Madunović. Officially Medić appointed his businesses partner to the position of president and appointed himself as an advisor to the club. For next three years Medić continue to openly operate within the club without limitation or further sanctions.

==== 2019 relegation ====
The club suffered a disastrous start to 2018–19 Third Croatian Football League West season with opening 5–0 away defeat at hands of NK Krk. In next round Zagreb faced "home" defeat 3–0 from Orijent 1919 which was played thankfully to NK HAŠK and their Stadion na Peščenici venue as club officials were unaware of pitch replacement process at Kranjčević Street home ground and failed to make all necessary preparations needed for licensing their training camp ZAGREBello venue for its home matches. NK Zagreb continued with its defeat queue: NK Maksimir 3–1 (A), NK Dubrava 4–0 (H), NK Vinogradar 9–1 (A), NK Vrbovec 3–1 (H) and was strip away from any relegation battle as only relegation candidate throughout entire season. They even managed to miss a game against NK Jadran Porec for not having a licensed doctor at the match.

Team lineup at the start of season was: Kurtović, Čilić, Vinski, Tarić, Zebić, Bektaši, Mihoković, Marinić, Jokić, Pavlic, Regović, Rajnović.

Results achieved in 2018–19 season were the outcome of the club's controversial president Dražen Medić's decision to start the competition with the youth team members. Zagreb inexperienced young players suddenly found themselves playing main roles in their first ever senior football, many of them directly skipping through youth teams such as above mentioned Karlo Mihoković who was age 16 at the time. Questionable attitude with no responsibility towards these young players, among whom were certainly talented ones like Kurtović, Tarić and Jokić resulted with incalculable consequences on their careers, collectively failing to display their talents in competitive manner through the trials of third-division football. As expected, NK Zagreb plunged to fourth tier competition for the first time in its 110 years long history.

==== Kranjčevićeva eviction ====
In 2018 after managing Stadion Kranjčevićeva as their home ground since 1946 for 72 years, NK Zagreb was denied of new managing contract by the city's officials which in the end led to eviction from the venue in October 2018. So, as of 2018–19 season NK Zagreb is using their training camp ZAGREBello venue with an approximate capacity of 1000 as a home ground for its official fixtures which is located in Veslačka street.

==== 2024 bankruptcy ====
The city of Zagreb submitted a petition to the Zagreb bankruptcy court to collect on a 500.000€ debt for the club's use of the Zagreb football centre in July 2024.

== Stadium ==
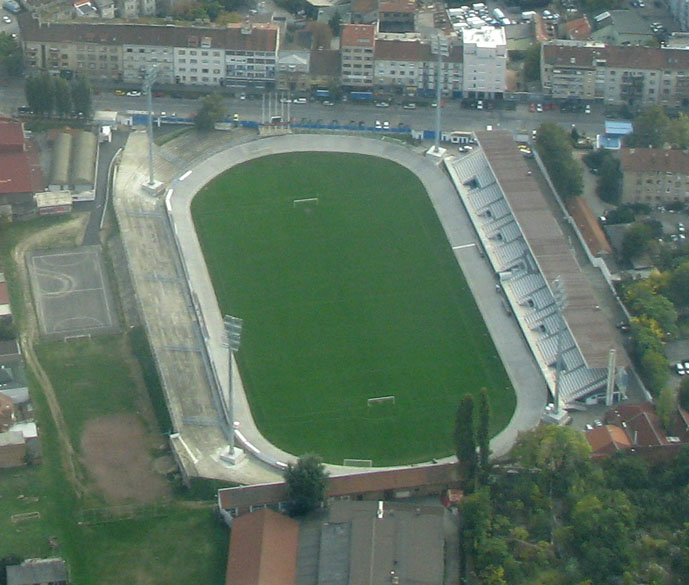
Aerial view of Kranjčević Street Stadium

Stadion u Kranjčevićevoj ulici (English: Kranjčević Street Stadium), known as Stadion Concordije between 1921 and 1945, also known as Stadion NK Zagreba or Stadion Zagreba between 1946 and 2018, is a multi-purpose stadium located in the north-east part of Trešnjevka neighbourhood in city of Zagreb, Croatia. The stadium at what was then called Tratinska cesta (Tratinska road) began construction in 1911 and was soon halted due to outbreak of Great War in 1914. With the end of Great War in 1918 the construction resumed and was eventually completed in 1921. At the time of its completion it was the biggest stadium in Zagreb and was owned and operated by one of three Zagreb based sports powerhouses named HŠK Concordia. The peculiarity of this stadium is non-existence of the usual athletic track. Instead, a profiled circular cycling track was built, the so-called cyclodrome, unique in Croatia and is used for various cycle and track race formats.

In 1931 the first floodlit match ever held in Zagreb was played at Kranjčević Street Stadium. The team consisted of best eleven Zagreb based players named Zagreb XI hosted the team of Real Madrid and eventually won 2–1. With the ending of Second World War newly in-powered communist authorities condemned HŠK Concordia as unfit. Partially being seen as a national (Croatian) representative and partially due to communist doctrine of Novi početak (The New beginning). Concordia was immediately disbanded and all its property confiscated along with stadium which was soon afterwards set on fire. In same year, 1946, now state owned stadium was finally handed over to newly formed Fiskulturno društvo Zagreb (Zagreb Sports Society), whose football section later evolved into today's Zagreb Football Club. NK Zagreb's third jersey was green in honour of Concordia whose stadium they were using.

In 1978 a large blazing fire destroyed the west stand of stadium for the second time which led to NK Zagreb's earning the nickname Pogorelci, meaning The Smolders. In following years the stadium went through several reconstructions and modifications. The most significant one was an extensive overhaul and construction of adjoining facilities in preparation for the 1987 Summer Universiade. Later that year a lightning strike destroyed the floodlights during a match between NK Zagreb and NK Osijek leaving Kranjčević Street Stadium without any floodlight capabilities for more than 20 years, till 2008, when the new ones were re-installed by the City of Zagreb.

After 2006–07 season and prior to NK Zagreb first leg game against Vllaznia in the Intertoto Cup stadium's capacity was reduced due to UEFA standards from 12,000 to 8,850 people by placing numbered plastic chairs in the west stand and reducing the space for visiting supporters at the eastern stand. The stadium consists of two stands. The west stand is fully seated and can hold 3,850 spectators. It houses the press box and the VIP area. The east stand has 5,000 standing places and is mainly used for travelling fans. In June 2008 UEFA inspection had visited the Kranjčević Street Stadium and gave it a 3-star rating, but criticised the lack of floodlights (which have been installed two months later) and press box provisions. With the capacity of 8,850 people, Kranjčević Street Stadium is the second biggest stadium in Zagreb, behind Stadion Maksimir. Currently within the stadium, there are a small number of offices and one restaurant. Today, the stadium is in use and open to public only on the official match days.

== Supporters ==
NK Zagreb has not had an active organized supporters’ group since 2014–2015, when the Bijeli Anđeli (White Angels) withdrew their support in protest against club mismanagement. The majority of the group’s members went on to found NK Zagreb 041, a fan-owned club. Since then, NK Zagreb has not had any significant or recognized ultras presence.

== Honours ==
- Croatian First League
  - Winners (1): 2001–02
  - Runners-up (2): 1992, 1993–94
  - Third place (3): 1992–93, 2004–05, 2006–07
- Croatian Second League
  - Winners (1): 2013–14
- Fourth Football League Center
  - Third place (1): 2020–21
- Croatian Cup
  - Runners up (1): 1996–97
- Croatian Super Cup
  - Runners-up (1): 2002
- Yugoslav Second League
  - Winners (6): 1953–54, 1963–64, 1972–73, 1975–76, 1979–80, 1990–91
  - Runners-up (1): 1974–75
  - Third place (2): 1970–71, 1971–72
- Yugoslav Third League
  - Winners (1): 1989–90
  - Third place (1): 1988–89
- Croatian Republic League
  - Winners (1): 1987–88
  - Runners-up (3): 1984–85, 1985–86, 1986–87

== Results by season ==
Season	League									Cup	European competitions		Top goalscorer	
Season	Division	P	W	D	L	GF	GA	Pts	Pos	Cup	European competitions		Player	Goals
1992	1. HNL	22	14	5	3	34	9	33	2nd	DNQ			Renato Jurčec	8
1992–93	1. HNL	30	15	10	5	50	27	40	3rd	R2			Joško Popović; Robert Špehar	9
1993–94	1. HNL	34	20	9	5	58	30	49	2nd	SF			Robert Špehar	19
1994–95	1. HNL	30	14	11	5	41	26	53	4th	QF			Joško Popović	9
1995–96	1. HNL	32	8	9	15	31	50	33	6th	SF	Intertoto Cup	GS	Joško Popović	10
1996–97	1. HNL	30	13	6	11	43	39	45	5th	RU			Vjekoslav Škrinjar	5
1997–98	1. HNL	32	14	8	10	51	39	50	5th	SF	Cup Winners' Cup	R1	**Mate Baturina**	18
1998–99	1. HNL	32	9	9	14	47	53	36	10th	R1			Nino Bule	13
1999–00	1. HNL	33	9	12	12	42	49	39	8th	SF			Nino Bule	9
2000–01	1. HNL	32	11	5	16	51	58	38	6th	SF			Krunoslav Lovrek	11
2001–02	1. HNL	30	20	7	3	71	24	67	**1st**	QF	Intertoto Cup	R1	**Ivica Olić**	21
2002–03	1. HNL	32	9	9	14	40	52	36	6th	QF	Champions League	QR2	Radomir Đalović	8
2003–04	1. HNL	32	8	12	12	33	41	36	10th	R2	Intertoto Cup	R1	Radomir Đalović	9
2004–05	1. HNL	32	15	5	12	50	42	50	3rd	QF			Mladen Bartolović	9
2005–06	1. HNL	32	11	4	17	26	43	37	10th	R1			Mladen Pelaić	5
2006–07	1. HNL	33	18	4	11	57	40	58	3rd	QF			Krunoslav Lovrek	18
2007–08	1. HNL	33	11	11	11	51	40	44	6th	SF	Intertoto Cup	R1	Krunoslav Lovrek	14
2008–09	1. HNL	33	13	8	12	38	39	47	5th	SF			Davor Vugrinec	11
2009–10	1. HNL	30	9	6	15	43	49	33	14th	QF			**Davor Vugrinec**	18
2010–11	1. HNL	30	9	8	13	32	39	35	13th	QF			**Ivan Krstanović**	19
2011–12	1. HNL	30	13	6	11	36	42	45	6th	SF			Damir Šovšić	5
2012–13	1. HNL	33	7	6	20	28	60	27	12th ↓	R2			Besart Abdurahimi	12
2013–14	2. HNL	33	20	7	6	59	26	67	1st ↑	R2			Gabrijel Boban	18
2014–15	1. HNL	36	13	7	16	45	54	46	5th	R1			Gabrijel Boban	13
2015–16	1. HNL	36	3	8	25	27	64	17	10th ↓	QF			Gabrijel Boban	10
2016–17	2. HNL	33	6	11	16	34	50	29	12th ↓	R1			Edin Šehić	10
2017–18	3. HNL West	34	13	5	16	46	51	44	9th [[]]	R2			Filip Matijasević	17
2018–19	3. HNL West	34	4	3	27	26	96	15	18th[[]] ↓	R1			Marko Bubnjić	10
2019–20	4. NL Center	16	7	6	3	25	20	27	6th[[]]	R1			Antonio Regović; Lovro Medić	7
2020–21	4. NL Center	34	20	8	6	71	36	68	3rd[[]]	R2			Lovro Medić	17
2021–22	4. NL Center	30	12	7	11	47	35	43	7th[[]] ↓	R1				
2022–23	4. NL Center-A	6	3	1	2	6	5	10	7th	n/a				

Key

1st	2nd/RU	↑	↓
Champions	Runners-up	Promoted	Relegated

Top scorer shown in bold when he was also top scorer for the division.

- P = Played
- W = Games won
- D = Games drawn
- L = Games lost
- F = Goals for
- A = Goals against
- Pts = Points
- Pos = Final position
- 1. HNL = Prva HNL
- 2. HNL = Druga HNL
- 3. HNL = Treća HNL
- 4. NL = Četvrta NL Centar
- GS = Group stage
- PR = Preliminary round
- R1 = Round 1
- R2 = Round 2
- QF = Quarter-finals
- SF = Semi-finals
- RU = Runners-up
- W = Winners

== European record ==
=== Summary ===
Competition	Pld	W	D	L	GF	GA	Last season played
UEFA Champions League	2	1	0	1	2	2	2002–03
UEFA Cup Winners' Cup	4	3	0	1	9	7	1997–98
UEFA Intertoto Cup	10	2	4	4	8	10	2007
Inter-Cities Fairs Cup	10	3	2	5	16	13	1969–70
Total	26	9	6	11	35	32	

Source: uefa.com, Last updated on 9 January 2010
Pld = Matches played; W = Matches won; D = Matches drawn; L = Matches lost; GF = Goals for; GA = Goals against. Defunct competitions indicated in italics.
Note: This summary includes matches played in the Inter-Cities Fairs Cup, which was not endorsed by UEFA and is not counted in UEFA's official European statistics.

=== Record by season ===
Season	Competition	Round	Opponent	Home	Away	Agg.
1964–65	Inter-Cities Fairs Cup	R1	(Austria) GAK	3–2	6–0	9–2
1964–65	Inter-Cities Fairs Cup	R2	(Italy) Roma	1–1	0–1	1–2
1965–66	Inter-Cities Fairs Cup	R1	(Belgium) RFC Liège	2–0	0–1	2–1
1965–66	Inter-Cities Fairs Cup	R2	(Romania) Steagul Roșu Brașov	2–2	0–1	2–3
1969–70	Inter-Cities Fairs Cup	R1	(Belgium) Charleroi	1–3	1–2	2–5
1995–96	Intertoto Cup	Group; 6	(Austria) LASK Linz	0–0	–	–
1995–96	Intertoto Cup	Group; 6	(Iceland) Keflavík	–	0–0	–
1995–96	Intertoto Cup	Group; 6	(France) Metz	0–1	–	–
1995–96	Intertoto Cup	Group; 6	(Scotland) Partick Thistle	–	2–1	–
1997–98	Cup Winners' Cup	QR	(North Macedonia) Sloga Jugomagnat	2–0	2–1	4–1
1997–98	Cup Winners' Cup	R1	(Norway) Tromsø	3–2	2–4	5–6
2001–02	Intertoto Cup	R1	(North Macedonia) Pobeda	1–2	1–1	2–3
2002–03	Champions League	QR2	(Hungary) Zalaegerszeg	2–1	0–1	2–2 (a)
2003–04	Intertoto Cup	R1	(Slovenia) Koper	2–2	0–1	2–3
2007–08	Intertoto Cup	R1	(Albania) Vllaznia	2–1	0–1	2–2 (a)

=== Record by country of opposition ===
- Correct as of 14 June 2011

Country	Pld	W	D	L	GF	GA	GD	Win%
Albania	2	1	0	1	2	2	+0	50.00
Austria	3	2	1	0	9	2	+7	66.67
Belgium	4	1	0	3	4	6	−2	25.00
France	1	0	0	1	0	1	−1	0.00
Iceland	1	0	1	0	0	0	+0	0.00
Italy	2	0	1	1	1	2	−1	0.00
Hungary	2	1	0	1	2	2	+0	50.00
(North Macedonia) Macedonia	4	2	1	1	6	4	+2	50.00
Norway	2	1	0	1	5	6	−1	50.00
Romania	2	0	1	1	2	3	−1	0.00
Scotland	1	1	0	0	2	1	+1	100.00
Slovenia	2	0	1	1	2	3	−1	0.00
Totals	26	9	6	11	35	32	+3	36.84

Pld – Matches played; W – Matches won; D – Matches drawn; L – Matches lost; GF – Goals for; GA – Goals against

=== Player records ===
- Most appearances in UEFA club competitions: 8 appearances
  - Jasenko Sabitović
  - Željko Sopić
- Top scorers in UEFA club competitions: 3 goals
  - Nino Bule
  - Krunoslav Lovrek

== Historical list of coaches ==
- (Socialist Federal Republic of Yugoslavia) Vlatko Marković
- (Socialist Federal Republic of Yugoslavia) Otto Barić (1974–76)
- (Socialist Federal Republic of Yugoslavia) Dražan Jerković (1976–82)
- (Socialist Federal Republic of Yugoslavia) Ilija Lončarević (1987–88)
- (Croatia) Ivo Šušak (1989–92)
- (Croatia) Ilija Lončarević (1994–95)
- (Croatia) Ivica Matković (1995–96)
- (Croatia) Krešimir Ganjto (1997)
- (Croatia) Branko Tucak (1997–98)
- (Croatia) Josip Kuže (1998–99)
- (Croatia) Ivo Šušak (1999–00)
- (Croatia) Branko Karačić (2000–01)
- (Croatia) Zlatko Kranjčar (July 2001 – June 2002)
- (Croatia) Ivan Katalinić (2002)
- (Croatia) Nikola Jurčević (2002–03)
- (Croatia) Zlatko Kranjčar (July 2003 – June 2004)
- (Croatia) Mile Petković (2004–05)
- (Croatia) Miroslav Blažević (July 2006 – June 2008)
- (Croatia) Luka Pavlović (July 2008 – Sept 2009)
- (Croatia) Igor Štimac (Sept 2009 – May 2010)
- (Croatia) Ivo Šušak (May – September 2010)
- (Croatia) Luka Pavlović (Sept 2010 – September 2011)
- (Croatia) Gordan Ciprić (Sept 2011 – March 2012)
- (Croatia) Dražen Besek (March – September 2012)
- (Croatia) Luka Bonačić (September – October) 2012
- (Croatia) Dražen Madunović (October – November 2012)
- (Croatia) (Bosnia and Herzegovina) Miroslav Blažević (Nov 2012 – May 2013)
- (Croatia) Vjekoslav Lokica (June 2013 – May 2014)
- (Croatia) Željko Kopić (June 2014 – 15 June)
- (Croatia) Dražen Madunović (2015)

== See also ==
- NK Zagreb 041
