= Goran Jerković (footballer, born 1965) =

Bosnian Croat footballer

Personal information
- Full name: Goran Jerković
- Date of birth: 23 April 1965 (age 61)
- Place of birth: Derventa, Yugoslavia
- Height: 1.84 m (6 ft 1/2 in)
- Position: Midfielder

Senior career*
Years	Team	Apps	(Gls)
1986–1990	Osijek	44	(3)
1990–1991	1. FC Schweinfurt 05	18	(1)
1991–1992	Stahl Eisenhüttenstadt		
1993–1994	FC Schwedt 02		
1994–1996	FC Augsburg		
1996–1997	TSV Schwaben Augsburg		
- * Club domestic league appearances and goals

Goran Jerković (born 23 April 1965 in Derventa, SFR Yugoslavia) is a retired Bosnian Croat Association football midfielder. He played for NK Osijek in the Yugoslav First League, and few lower-league German clubs.
