= Luka Pavlović (football) =

Croatian football manager (born 1963)

Personal information
- Date of birth: 10 May 1963 (age 63)
- Place of birth: Čapljina,SR Bosnia and Herzegovina, SFR Yugoslavia

Team information
- Current team: Rijeka (academy manager)

Managerial career
- Years: Team
- 2003: Hrvatski Dragovoljac
- 2004: Karlovac
- 2008–2009: NK Zagreb
- 2010–2011: NK Zagreb
- 2013–2015: Croatia U17
- 2016–2019: Sheriff Tiraspol (academy)
- 2019-2022: Baltika Kaliningrad (academy)
- 2022-: Rijeka (academy)

Luka Pavlović (born 10 May 1963) is a Croatian football manager.

He is the head of HNK Rijeka football academy.

== Personal life ==
His son Mateo is a footballer who played for SCO Angers in France.
