= NK Karlovac 1919 =

Croatian football club

- Full name: Nogometni klub Karlovac 1919
- Nickname: Plavo-bijeli (The Blue-Whites)
- Founded: 1919 (as NK Borac); 2012 (as NK Karlovac 1919)
- Ground: Stadion Branko Čavlović-Čavlek
- Head coach: Igor Pamić
- League: Prva NL
- 2025–26: 7th
Home colours	Away colours	Third colours

NK Karlovac 1919 is a Croatian professional football club based in the town of Karlovac. Karlovac plays their home matches at Stadion Branko Čavlović-Čavlek.

== History ==
Traditionally lower-level minnows, the club's most successful period in the Yugoslav football league system was in the 1970s when they competed in the Yugoslav Second League. After the breakup of Yugoslavia and the formation of the Croatian football league system in 1992 Karlovac spent most of the time playing in Druga HNL and Treća HNL, second and third levels.

Led by manager Igor Pamić, Karlovac won consecutive promotions in the 2007–08 and 2008–09 seasons, which saw them join the top level for the first time in their history. After a sixth-place finish in debut season in 1. HNL and equally good second season, financial troubles during 2011–12 season hit Karlovac hard. They faced relegation to second division but due to financial irregularities, Karlovac was suspended by Croatian Football Federation.

In summer of 2012, NK Karlovac 1919 was founded as a successor club but the two clubs' track records and honors are kept separate by the Croatian Football Federation.

=== Former names ===
Founded in 1919 as NK Borac, they changed their name in 1920 to NŠK Karlovac. This lasted until 1941 when they merged with several local sides to form ŠK Velebit. Following World War II Velebit was disbanded and re-established as FD Udarnik, which was then renamed in 1948 SD Slavija before adopting their current name NK Karlovac in 1954.

- Borac (1919–1920)
- NŠK Karlovac (1920–1941)
- HŠK Velebit (1941–1945)
- Udarnik (1945–1948)
- Slavija (1948–1954)
- Karlovac (1954–1958)
- KSD (1958–1960)
- Karlovac (1960–2012)

== Honours ==
- Druga HNL
  - Runners-up (1): 2008–09
- Treća HNL – Center:
  - Winners (1): 2004–05
- Treća HNL – West:
  - Winners (1): 2007–08

== Recent seasons ==
Season	League									Cup	Top goalscorer	
Season	Division	P	W	D	L	F	A	Pts	Pos	Cup	Player	Goals
1992	2. HNL North	10	3	2	5	8	17	8	5th			
1992–93	2. HNL North	30	8	6	16	41	69	22	14th			
1993–94	2. HNL North	30	10	6	14	34	46	26	10th			
1994–95	2. HNL West	36	13	8	15	59	35	47	12th	R1		
1995–96	2. HNL West	34	9	8	17	25	52	35	14th	R1		
1996–97	2. HNL Centre	30	17	7	6	56	32	58	3rd			
1997–98	2. HNL Centre	30	7	6	19	36	59	27	12th			
1998–99	3. HNL Centre	30	13	9	8	53	40	48	5th			
1999–2000	3. HNL Centre	28	17	7	4	50	17	58	2nd			
2000–01	3. HNL Centre	30	10	8	12	43	43	38	11th	R1		
2001–02	3. HNL Centre	30	14	5	11	53	34	47	7th			
2002–03	3. HNL Centre	30	17	4	9	49	36	55	2nd			
2003–04	3. HNL Centre	30	14	5	11	50	45	47	6th	PR		
2004–05	3. HNL Centre	32	19	5	8	73	37	62	1st ↑	R1		
2005–06	2. HNL South	32	4	6	22	21	70	18	12th ↓		Saša Kajkut	5
2006–07	3. HNL West	34	13	7	14	46	49	46	12th	R1	Ivan Trbušić	12
2007–08	3. HNL West	34	28	3	3	96	20	87	1st ↑		Mario Rac	30
2008–09	2. HNL	30	18	5	7	50	24	59	2nd ↑	R2	Ivan Lišnić	10
2009–10	1. HNL	30	12	11	7	32	23	47	6th	R2	Enes Novinić, Zvonko Pamić	5
2010–11	1. HNL	30	11	8	11	25	27	41	6th	R2	Karlo Primorac	5
2011–12	1. HNL	30	6	7	17	25	53	24	15th ↓	R2	Enes Novinić	7

=== Key ===
1st	2nd	↑	↓
Champions	Runners-up	Promoted	Relegated

Top scorer shown in bold when he was also top scorer for the division.

- P = Played
- W = Games won
- D = Games drawn
- L = Games lost
- F = Goals for
- A = Goals against
- Pts = Points
- Pos = Final position
- 1. HNL = Prva HNL
- 2. HNL = Druga HNL
- 3. HNL = Treća HNL
- PR = Preliminary round
- R1 = Round 1
- R2 = Round 2
- QF = Quarter-finals
- SF = Semi-finals
- RU = Runners-up
- W = Winners

== Current squad ==
As of 28 February 2026

Note: Flags indicate national team as defined under FIFA eligibility rules; some limited exceptions apply. Players may hold more than one non-FIFA nationality.

No.	Pos.	Nation	Player
1	GK	CRO	Domagoj Ivan Marić (on loan from Rijeka)
2	DF	CRO	Mateo Barać (on loan from Slaven Belupo)
3	DF	CRO	Fran Žilinski (on loan from Lokomotiva Zagreb)
4	DF	CRO	Gabrijel Stepinac
5	DF	CRO	Patrik Braun
6	DF	CRO	Dino Šimunić
7	DF	CRO	David Ereiz
8	MF	CRO	Goran Paracki
10	FW	CRO	Marko Žuljević (on loan from Slaven Belupo)
11	MF	CRO	Josip Budimir
12	GK	CRO	Tin Šarkanj
13	DF	CRO	Patrik Mrkela
14	DF	CRO	Ante Buneta

No.	Pos.	Nation	Player
15	MF	CRO	Mihael Stipić
16	FW	CRO	Domagoj Regetaš
17	FW	CRO	Zlatan Koščević
18	MF	CRO	Matej Šop
19	MF	CRO	Luka Kapulica (on loan from Gorica)
20	MF	CRO	Zvonko Pamić (captain)
21	MF	BIH	Matej Gašpar
22	DF	CRO	Petar Raguž (on loan from Rijeka)
24	FW	CRO	Dominik Simčić (on loan from Rijeka)
26	DF	CRO	Marin Markeljević
27	MF	CRO	Stjepan Šalić
28	MF	CRO	Antonio Mionić

=== Other players under contract ===
Note: Flags indicate national team as defined under FIFA eligibility rules; some limited exceptions apply. Players may hold more than one non-FIFA nationality.

No. / Pos. / Nation / Player; — / GK / CRO / Antonio Cikač	No. / Pos. / Nation / Player; — / GK / CRO / Tin Šarkanj

=== Out on loan ===
Note: Flags indicate national team as defined under FIFA eligibility rules; some limited exceptions apply. Players may hold more than one non-FIFA nationality.

No.	Pos.	Nation	Player
2	DF	CRO	Filip Brekalo

== Managers ==
- (Croatia) Igor Pamić (2007–2011)
- (Croatia) Srećko Lušić (Mar 2011 – Sept 2011)
- (Croatia) Damir Petravić (Sep 2011 – Dec 2011)
- (Croatia) Krešimir Ganjto (Jan 2012 – Mar 2012)
- (Croatia) Sanjin Lucijanić (Mar 2012 – May 2012)
- (Croatia) Igor Pamić (8 Oct 2021–present)
