= Igor Pamić =

Croatian footballer and manager

Personal information
- Date of birth: 19 November 1969 (age 56)
- Place of birth: Žminj, SR Croatia, SFR Yugoslavia
- Height: 1.91 m (6 ft 3 in)
- Position: Forward

Team information
- Current team: Karlovac 1919 (manager)

Youth career
- Pazinka

Senior career*
Years	Team	Apps	(Gls)
1992–1993	Istra Pula	34	(12)
1993–1994	Pazinka	23	(18)
1994–1995	Croatia Zagreb	28	(10)
1995–1996	Osijek	25	(17)
1996–1997	Sochaux	29	(10)
1997–1998	Hansa Rostock	37	(13)
1999–2002	Grazer AK	66	(23)
Total		242	(103)

International career
1996–1998	Croatia	5	(1)

Managerial career
- 2002–2003: Žminj
- 2004–2005: Pula 1856
- 2006–2007: Žminj
- 2007–2011: Karlovac
- 2011–2015: Istra 1961
- 2016–2017: Koper
- 2017–2018: Hrvatski Dragovoljac
- 2018–2019: OFK Titograd
- 2020: GOŠK Gabela
- 2021–: Karlovac 1919
- * Club domestic league appearances and goals

Igor Pamić (born 19 November 1969) is a Croatian former professional footballer and current manager.

He made five appearances for the Croatia national team during his playing career.

== Playing career ==
=== Club ===
He was born in the village of Žminj in Istria and started his professional career at the club Istra Pula in early 1992. He left the club after two seasons for Dinamo Zagreb, where he spent another two seasons before moving to Osijek in July 1995. After one season with Osijek, he moved abroad by signing with French club Sochaux in July 1996. He scored a total of 57 goals in five seasons of playing in the Croatian First League.

At club level, he left Sochaux in June 1997 after one season of playing for the club and went on to sign with German Bundesliga side Hansa Rostock. In a season and half of playing for Hansa, Pamić appeared in a total of 37 Bundesliga matches and managed to score 13 goals for the club in the league. With the beginning of the year 1999, he transferred to Austrian Bundesliga side Grazer AK and continued to play for the club before he finished his career as a player in the autumn of 2001, playing his last league match on 21 October 2001 against Rapid Wien. In two half-seasons and two entire seasons of playing for GAK, he appeared in a total of 66 Bundesliga matches and scored 23 goals.

=== International ===
He made his debut for the Croatia national team in a friendly match against Hungary on 10 April 1996 in Osijek and also managed to score his first and only international goal in this match. He was subsequently also part of the Croatian squad at the UEFA Euro 1996 finals in England, but made only one appearance at the tournament by playing the first half of the final group match against Portugal. He subsequently appeared in only two more matches for the Croatia national team, playing as a substitute in a 1996 friendly against Morocco as well as in the Croatian team's first UEFA Euro 2000 qualifier against the Republic of Ireland on 5 September 1998. In all, he won a total of five international caps and scored one goal for Croatia.

== Managerial career ==
Shortly after retiring from football as a player, Pamić started his managerial career in the sport. He was the head coach of Croatian Third League side NK Žminj in 2002 and 2003, going on to move to Croatian Second League side NK Pula in early 2004, helping them to clinch promotion to the Croatian First League for the 2004–05 season.

Pamić left Pula in the winter break of the 2005–06 season and returned to Žminj in 2006, spending a season with the club. In 2007, he was appointed head coach at Karlovac, with whom he clinched promotion to the Croatian First League in 2009. He returned to Karlovac 1919 in October 2021, after spells at the helm of Slovenian club Koper, Montenegrin outfit OFK Titograd and Bosnian side GOŠK Gabela.

== Personal life ==
His sons Zvonko and Alen are also a professional football players. His son Alen died in June 2013.

== Career statistics ==
=== Club ===
Appearances and goals by club, season and competition
Club	Season	League			National Cup		Europe		Other		Total	
Club	Season	Division	Apps	Goals	Apps	Goals	Apps	Goals	Apps	Goals	Apps	Goals
NK Istra	1992	Prva HNL	11	5	3	0	–		–		14	5
NK Istra	1992–93	Prva HNL	23	7	3	1	–		–		26	8
NK Istra	Total		34	12	6	1	0	0	0	0	40	13
Croatia Zagreb	1993–94	Prva HNL	1	0	1	0	1	0	–		3	0
NK Pazinka	1993–94	Prva HNL	23	18	1	0	–		–		24	18
Croatia Zagreb	1994–95	Prva HNL	27	10	7	3	2	1	2 (Note: Appearances in Croatian Super Cup)	0	38	14
NK Osijek	1995–96	Prva HNL	25	17	3	0	2	0	–		30	17
Sochaux	1996–97	Division 2	29	10	0	0	–		1 (Note: Appearance in Coupe de la Ligue)	0	30	10
Hansa Rostock	1997–98	Bundesliga	27	7	1	0	–		–		28	7
Hansa Rostock	1998–99	Bundesliga	10	6	1	0	2	1	–		28	7
Hansa Rostock	Total		37	13	2	0	2	1	0	0	41	14
Grazer AK	1998–99	Austrian Bundesliga	11	1	1	0	–		–		12	1
Grazer AK	1999–00	Austrian Bundesliga	24	9	4	2	4	1	–		32	12
Grazer AK	2000–01	Austrian Bundesliga	28	14	4	2	3	1	1 (Note: Appearance in Austrian Super Cup)	1	36	18
Grazer AK	2001–02	Austrian Bundesliga	4	0	1	0	1	0	–		6	0
Grazer AK	Total		67	24	10	4	8	2	1	1	86	31
Career total			243	104	30	8	15	4	4	1	292	117

=== International ===
Appearances and goals by national team and year
National team	Year	Apps	Goals
Croatia	1996	4	1
Croatia	1997	0	0
Croatia	1998	1	0
Total		5	1

== Managerial statistics ==
As of 25 October 2020

Team	From	To	Record				
Team	From	To	G	W	D	L	Win %
NK Žminj	2002	2003	30	20	2	8	66.67
NK Pula 1856	July 2004	October 2006	46	9	18	19	19.57
NK Karlovac	July 2007	March 2011	123	69	24	30	56.10
NK Istra 1961	March 2011	October 2015	173	55	49	69	31.79
FC Koper	October 2016	June 2017	24	6	12	6	25.00
NK Hrvatski Dragovoljac	July 2017	May 2018	33	8	10	15	24.24
OFK Titograd	July 2018	January 2019	19	9	5	5	47.37
NK GOŠK Gabela	August 2020	October 2020	10	2	2	6	20.00
Total			458	178	122	158	38.86

== Honours ==
=== Player ===
Croatia Zagreb

- Croatian Cup: 1994

Grazer AK

- Austrian Cup: 2000, 2002
- Austrian Super Cup: 2000

=== Manager ===
Žminj

- Treća HNL - West: 2002–03

Karlovac

- Treća HNL - West: 2007–08
- Druga HNL: 2008–09
