= NK Žminj =

Croatian football club

- Full name: NK Žminj
- Founded: 1970
- Ground: Igralište Žminja
- Capacity: 1.000
- Chairman: Denis Damijanić
- Manager: Mirko Matika
- League: First League of Istria County
Home colours	Away colours

NK Žminj is a Croatian football club based in a village of Žminj in the central part of Istria.

== Honours ==
(Croatia) Treća HNL – West:

- Winners (2): 1999–2000, 2002–03
