= 2009–10 NK Dinamo Zagreb season =

Dinamo Zagreb
2009–10 season
- Chairman: Mirko Barišić
- Manager: Krunoslav Jurčić
- Stadium: Stadion Maksimir
- Prva HNL: 1st (champions)
- Croatian Cup: Semi-final (eliminated by Hajduk Split)
- UEFA Champions League: Third qualifying round (eliminated by Red Bull Salzburg)
- UEFA Europa League: Group stage
- Top goalscorer: League: Mario Mandžukić (14); All: Mario Mandžukić (17)
- Highest home attendance: 22,000 (vs Hearts, 20 August 2009)
- Lowest home attendance: 0 (vs Pyunik, 21 July 2010)
Home colours	Away colours

This article shows statistics of individual players for the football club Dinamo Zagreb. It also lists all matches that Dinamo Zagreb played in the 2009–10 season.

== Events ==
=== Pre-season ===
- 13 June: Midfielder Mirko Hrgović leaves the club after his contract is terminated on mutual consent. Hrgović spent a single season with the club after being transferred from JEF United in summer 2008.
- 19 June: The club releases official confirmation that the 24-year-old Chilean midfielder Pedro Morales contracted swine influenza while visiting Chile. Morales is expected to stay in Chile and join the team upon recovery.
- 19 June: Albanian midfielder Emiljano Vila signs for the club from Teuta Durrës for a yet undisclosed fee, on recommendation from Josip Kuže, former manager of Dinamo and Albania.
- 26 June: Greek international Dimitrios Papadopoulos signs for the club from Italian side Lecce on a three-year contract.

=== Season ===
- 14 December: Media reports confirm that the managing board had decided to terminate contracts with Dimitrios Papadopoulos and Leandro Cufré and that they would be free to find new clubs in the winter transfer period. The board also decided to end Denis Glavina's loan and send him back to Vorskla. The board also said cleared a possible transfer of Mario Mandžukić in case Dinamo receive a good offer for him, and the media cited rumours that Dodo would be brought from Inter Zaprešić to replace him.

== First-team squad ==
=== Current squad ===
As of 26 September 2009

Note: Flags indicate national team as defined under FIFA eligibility rules; some limited exceptions apply. Players may hold more than one non-FIFA nationality.

No.	Pos.	Nation	Player
1	GK	CRO	Tomislav Butina
2	DF	CRO	Ivan Tomečak
3	DF	ARG	Luis Ibáñez
4	DF	CRO	Robert Kovač (vice-captain)
5	MF	ARG	Adrián Calello
6	DF	CRO	Dejan Lovren
7	DF	BRA	Etto ^{1}
8	MF	CRO	Ante Tomić
9	FW	CRO	Andrej Kramarić
10	MF	BRA	Sammir ^{1}
11	DF	CRO	Denis Glavina (on loan from Vorskla)
13	MF	CMR	Mathias Chago ^{1}
15	DF	BRA	Carlos ^{1}

No.	Pos.	Nation	Player
16	MF	CRO	Milan Badelj
17	FW	CRO	Mario Mandžukić
19	DF	CRO	Tomislav Barbarić
20	FW	CZE	Miroslav Slepička
21	MF	CRO	Ivica Vrdoljak
22	DF	CRO	Igor Bišćan (captain)
24	FW	CRO	Ilija Sivonjić
25	DF	ARG	Leandro Cufré
30	GK	CRO	Filip Lončarić
33	GK	CRO	Dominik Picak
77	MF	CHI	Pedro Morales
99	FW	GRE	Dimitrios Papadopoulos

^{1} player has Croatian citizenship

=== Kit ===
Supplier: Diadora
Sponsor(s): INA, Privredna banka Zagreb, Večernji list

Home	Away	Third kit

Last updated: 14 July.
Source: Sportnet.hr

=== Squad statistics ===
Updated 1 October 2009.

No.	Pos.	Name	League		Cup		Europe		Total		Discipline	
No.	Pos.	Name	Apps	Goals	Apps	Goals	Apps	Goals	Apps	Goals	Yellow card	Red card
1	GK	(Croatia) Tomislav Butina	25	0	0	0	7	0	32	0	0	0
2	DF	(Croatia) Ivan Tomečak	17	1	1	0	4	0	22	1	1	0
3	DF	(Argentina) Luis Ibáñez	18	0	1	0	0	0	19	0	2	0
4	DF	(Croatia) Robert Kovač	14	0	0	0	2	0	16	0	1	0
5	MF	(Argentina) Adrián Calello	20	0	1	0	3	0	24	0	2	0
6	DF	(Croatia) Dejan Lovren	14	0	1	0	7	1	22	1	5	0
7	DF	(Brazil) Etto	21	0	0	0	6	0	27	0	4	0
8	MF	(Croatia) Ante Tomić	0	0	1	0	0	0	1	0	0	0
9	FW	(Croatia) Andrej Kramarić	24	7	1	1	3	0	28	8	0	0
10	MF	(Brazil) Sammir	26	5	1	1	8	1	35	7	1	0
11	DF	(Croatia) Denis Glavina	4	0	0	0	2	0	6	0	1	0
13	MF	(Cameroon) Mathias Chago	3	0	1	0	3	0	7	0	0	0
15	DF	(Brazil) Carlos	2	0	0	0	5	0	7	0	1	0
16	MF	(Croatia) Milan Badelj	27	11	0	0	8	2	35	13	3	0
17	FW	(Croatia) Mario Mandžukić	24	14	0	0	7	3	31	17	3	1
19	DF	(Croatia) Tomislav Barbarić	22	4	1	0	6	0	31	4	2	0
20	FW	(Czech Republic) Miroslav Slepička	15	4	1	1	6	0	22	5	1	0
21	MF	(Croatia) Ivica Vrdoljak	27	0	0	0	8	1	35	1	0	0
22	DF	(Croatia) Igor Bišćan	4	0	0	0	6	1	10	1	2	0
14	DF	(Croatia) Šime Vrsaljko	10	0	0	0	0	0	10	0	0	0
18	FW	(Croatia) Domagoj Antolić	10	0	0	0	0	0	10	0	0	0
23	FW	(Brazil) Luiz Paulo Hilario	9	3	0	0	0	0	9	3	0	0
25	DF	(Argentina) Leandro Cufré	18	0	0	0	2	0	20	0	0	0
30	GK	(Croatia) Filip Lončarić	4	0	1	0	1	0	6	0	0	0
77	MF	(Chile) Pedro Morales	21	13	0	0	7	1	28	14	2	0
33	GK	(Croatia) Dominik Picak	1	0	0	0	0	0	1	0	0	0
15	FW	(Croatia) Karlo Primorac	7	0	0	0	0	0	10	0	0	0
13	MF	(Croatia) Frano Mlinar	1	0	0	0	0	0	1	0	0	0
30	GK	(Croatia) Ivan Turina	1	0	0	0	0	0	1	0	0	0
99	FW	(Greece) Dimitrios Papadopoulos	13	2	0	0	8	2	21	4	1	0

== Competitions ==
=== Overall ===
Competition	Started round	Final position / round	First match	Last Match
2009–10 Prva HNL	–	Champions	25 July	13 May
2009–10 Croatian Cup	First round	Semi-final	23 September	7 April
2009–10 UEFA Champions League	QR2	QR3	14 July	4 August
2009–10 UEFA Europa League	Play-off round	Group stage	20 August	17 December

=== Prva HNL ===
==== Classification ====
Pos	Team	Pld	W	D	L	GF	GA	GD	Pts	Qualification or relegation
1	Dinamo Zagreb (C)	30	18	8	4	70	20	+50	62	Qualification to Champions League second qualifying round
2	Hajduk Split	30	17	7	6	50	21	+29	58	Qualification to Europa League third qualifying round (Note: Hajduk Split won the 2009–10 Croatian Cup and thus qualified for the third qualifying round of the 2010–11 UEFA Europa League.)
3	Cibalia	30	16	9	5	46	20	+26	57	Qualification to Europa League second qualifying round
4	Šibenik	30	14	8	8	34	37	−3	50	Qualification to Europa League first qualifying round
5	Osijek	30	13	8	9	49	36	+13	47	

Source: Sportnet.hr
Rules for classification: 1) points; 2) goal difference; 3) number of goals scored.
For deciding champions, qualification to UEFA Europa League and relegation: 1st points; 2nd head-to-head points; 3rd head-to-head goal difference; 4th head-to-head away goals scored.
(C) Champions

==== Results summary ====
Overall								Home						Away					
Pld	W	D	L	GF	GA	GD	Pts	W	D	L	GF	GA	GD	W	D	L	GF	GA	GD
30	18	8	4	70	20	+50	62	11	5	0	49	6	+43	7	3	4	21	14	+7

Last updated: 13 May 2010.
Source: Sportnet.hr

==== Results by round ====
Round	1	2	3	4	5	6	7	8	9	10	11	12	13	14	15	16	17	18	19	20	21	22	23	24	25	26	27	28	29	30
Ground	H	H	AR	HR	A	H	A	H	A	H	A	H	A	H	A	A	A	H	A	H	A	H	A	H	A	H	A	H	A	H
Result	W	W	W	W	D	W	W	W	W	W	L	D	L	W	W	D	W	W	W	D	W	W	D	W	W	D	L	D	L	D
Position	1	1	1	1	1	1	1	1	1	1	1	1	1	1	1	1	1	1	1	1	1	1	1	1	1	1	1	1	1	1

Updated to match(es) played on 13 May 2010. Source: Competitive matches
A = Away; H = Home; W = Win; D = Draw; L = Loss

==== Results by opponent ====
Team	Results		Points
Team	Home	Away	Points
Cibalia	1–1	0–2	1
Croatia Sesvete	6–0	5–2	6
Hajduk Split	0–0	1–2	1
Inter Zaprešić	3–1	1–0	6
Istra 1961	7–1	0–0	4
Karlovac	1–1	3–1	4
Lokomotiva	1–0	1–0	6
Međimurje	4–0	4–1	6
Osijek	5–0	1–0	6
Rijeka	6–0	2–2	4
Slaven Belupo	6–0	1–0	6
Šibenik	5–0	1–2	3
Varteks	2–1	2–1	6
Zadar	0–0	0–0	2
NK Zagreb	1–1	0–1	1

Source: 2009–10 Prva HNL article

=== UEFA Europa League ===
==== Group A ====
Pos	Team	Pld	W	D	L	GF	GA	GD	Pts	Qualification	AND	AJX	DZ	TIM
1	(Belgium) Anderlecht	6	3	2	1	9	4	+5	11	Advance to knockout phase	—	1–1	0–1	3–1
2	(Netherlands) Ajax	6	3	2	1	8	6	+2	11	Advance to knockout phase	1–3	—	2–1	0–0
3	(Croatia) Dinamo Zagreb (Note: On 29 October 2009, UEFA's Control and Disciplinary Body ruled that Dinamo Zagreb would have to play their next two home matches in the UEFA Europa League behind closed doors due to the actions of their supporters in their match at Timișoara. They also deducted three points from the Croatian club's points tally in Group A. The club appealed, but the appeal was not heard until after the first closed-doors game against Ajax. After the appeal was heard, UEFA replaced the three-point deduction with a €75,000 fine, and a three-year suspended ban from European competition, while the two-match stadium ban remained unchanged.)	6	2	0	4	6	8	−2	6		0–2	0–2	—	1–2
4	(Romania) Timișoara	6	1	2	3	4	9	−5	5		0–0	1–2	0–3	—

Source: Soccerway

== Matches ==
=== Competitive ===
M	Date	Tournament	Round	Ground	Opponent	Score	Attendance	Dinamo Scorers	Report
1	14 Jul	UCL	QR2	A (Armenia)	Pyunik (Armenia)	0–0	10,000		Sportnet.hr
2	21 Jul	UCL	QR2	H	Pyunik (Armenia)	3–0	0^{[1]}	Mandžukić, Badelj, Lovren	Sportnet.hr
3	25 Jul	1. HNL	1	H	Istra 1961	7–1	4,000	Slepička, Morales (2), Mandžukić (2), Sivonjić, Badelj	Sportnet.hr
4	29 Jul	UCL	QR3	A (Austria)	Red Bull Salzburg (Austria)	1–1	17,000	Mandžukić	
5	1 Aug	1. HNL	2	H	Međimurje	4–0	6,000	Kramarić (2), Slepička, Papadopoulos	Sportnet.hr
6	4 Aug	UCL	QR3	H	Red Bull Salzburg (Austria)	1–2	20,000	Papadopoulos	
7	8 Aug	1. HNL	3	AR	Croatia Sesvete	5–2	2,000	Papadopoulos, Mandžukić (2), Morales (2)	sportnet.hr
8	16 Aug	1. HNL	4	HR	Osijek	5–0	5,000	Sammir (3), Badelj, Mandžukić	sportnet.hr
9	20 Aug	UEL	Play-off	H	Hearts (Scotland)	4–0	22,000	Mandžukić, Papadopoulos, Vrdoljak, Bišćan	
10	23 Aug	1. HNL	5	A	Zadar	0–0	3,500		sportnet.hr
11	27 Aug	UEL	Play-off	A (Scotland)	Hearts (Scotland)	0–2	11,769		
12	30 Aug	1. HNL	6	H	Slaven Belupo	6–0	5,000	Barbarić, Morales (2), Mandžukić, Sivonjić, Badelj	sportnet.hr
13	12 Sep	1. HNL	7	A	Inter Zaprešić	1–0	900	Morales	sportnet.hr
14	17 Sep	UEL	Group	H	Anderlecht (Belgium)	0–2	20,000		
15	19 Sep	1. HNL	8	H	Rijeka	6–0	1,500	Morales (2), Sivonjić (2), Barbarić, Kramarić	sportnet.hr
16	23 Sep	Cup	R1	A	NK Plitvica	4–0	2,500	Sivonjić, Slepička, Sammir, Kramarić	sportnet.hr
17	26 Sep	1. HNL	9	AR	Lokomotiva	1–0	500	Mandžukić	sportnet.hr
18	1 Oct	UEL	Group	A (Romania)	Timişoara (Romania)	3–0	7,000	Badelj, Sammir, Morales	
19	4 Oct	1. HNL	10	H	Varteks	2–1	4,000	Mandžukić, Badelj	sportnet.hr
20	17 Oct	1. HNL	11	A	NK Zagreb	0–1	4,000		sportnet.hr
21	22 Oct	UEL	Group	A (Netherlands)	Ajax (Netherlands)	1–2	20,000	Tomečak	
22	25 Oct	1. HNL	12	H	Cibalia	1–1	1,500	Morales	sportnet.hr
23	28 Oct	Cup	R2	A	Vinogradar	4–1		Slepička (2), Kramarić (2)	sportnet.hr
24	31 Oct	1. HNL	13	A	Hajduk Split	1–2	4,000	Sivonjić	sportnet.hr
25	5 Nov	UEL	Group	H	Ajax (Netherlands)	0–2	0		
26	8 Nov	1. HNL	14	H	Šibenik	5–0	3,000	Morales, Sivonjić, Kramarić, Badelj, Barbarić	sportnet.hr
27	22 Nov	1. HNL	15	A	Karlovac	3–1	4,200	Morales, Badelj (2)	sportnet.hr
28	25 Nov	Cup	QF	A	Pomorac	2–0	4,000	Papadopoulos, Badelj	sportnet.hr
29	28 Nov	1. HNL	16	AR	Istra 1961	0–0	3,000		sportnet.hr
30	2 Dec	UEL	Group	A (Belgium)	Anderlecht (Belgium)	1–0		Slepička	
31	6 Dec	1. HNL	17	A	Međimurje	4–1	4,000	Morales, Slepička, Kramarić (2)	sportnet.hr
32	9 Dec	Cup	QF	H	Pomorac	3–2	500	Kramarić, Ibáñez, Chago	sportnet.hr
33	17 Dec	UEL	Group	H	Timişoara (Romania)	1–2	0	Scutaru (o.g.)	
34	27 Feb	1. HNL	18	H	Croatia Sesvete	6–0	2,500	Mandžukić (3), Badelj, Dodô, Tomečak	sportnet.hr
35	6 Mar	1. HNL	19	A	Osijek	1–0	5,000	Mandžukić	sportnet.hr
36	13 Mar	1. HNL	20	H	Zadar	0–0	3,500		sportnet.hr
37	20 Mar	1. HNL	21	A	Slaven Belupo	1–0	2,500	Slepička	sportnet.hr
38	24 Mar	Cup	SF	H	Hajduk Split	0–0	13,000		sportnet.hr
39	27 Mar	1. HNL	22	H	Inter Zaprešić	3–1	2,000	Mandžukić (2), Badelj	sportnet.hr
40	3 Apr	1. HNL	23	A	Rijeka	2–2	4,500	Sammir, Barbarić	sportnet.hr
41	7 Apr	Cup	SF	A	Hajduk Split	0–1	30,000		sportnet.hr
42	10 Apr	1. HNL	24	H	Lokomotiva	1–0	3,000	Sammir	sportnet.hr
43	14 Apr	1. HNL	25	A	Varteks	2–1	2,000	Dodô, Badelj	sportnet.hr
44	17 Apr	1. HNL	26	H	NK Zagreb	1–1	5,000	Badelj	sportnet.hr
45	24 Apr	1. HNL	27	A	Cibalia	0–2	5,000		sportnet.hr
46	1 May	1. HNL	28	H	Hajduk Split	0–0	13,000		sportnet.hr
47	8 May	1. HNL	29	A	Šibenik	1–2	2,000	Dodô	sportnet.hr
48	13 May	1. HNL	30	H	Karlovac	1–1	500	Kramarić	sportnet.hr

Last updated 13 May 2010
Sources: Prva-HNL.hr, Sportske novosti, Sportnet.hr

=== Friendlies ===
M	Date	Tournament	Round	Ground	Opponent	Score	Dinamo Scorers
1	18 June	Friendly	N/A	A	NAŠK	3–0	Tadić (2), Sivonjić
2	21 June	Friendly	N/A	A (Slovenia)	Rudar Velenje (Slovenia)	1–2	Kramarić
3	24 June	Friendly	N/A	A (Slovenia)	NK Radomlje (Slovenia)	11–3	Tadić (3), Sivonjić (2), Kramarić (2), Bišćan, Badelj, Sammir, Vila
4	5 July	Friendly	N/A	N (Austria)	Steaua Bucharest (Romania)	0–1	
5	8 July	Friendly	N/A	A	Lučko	7–0	Sammir (3), Sivonjić (2), Badelj, Morales
5	11 August	Friendly	N/A	A	Mladost Petrinja	7–2	Kramarić (3), Sammir, Sivonjić, Bišćan, Papadopoulos
7	4 September	Friendly	N/A	A	Radnik Sesvete	4–1	Sivonjić, Tomić (2), Krpić
8	7 September	Friendly	N/A	A	NK Crikvenica	1–0	Robert Štrkalj

== Player seasonal records ==
Competitive matches only. Updated to games played 13 May 2010.

Key

Player left the club in mid-season
Player joined the club in mid-season

=== Goalscorers ===
Rank	Name	League	Cup	Europe	Total
1	(Croatia) Mario Mandžukić	14	–	3	17
2	(Chile) Pedro Morales	13	–	1	14
2	(Croatia) Milan Badelj	11	1	2	14
4	(Croatia) Andrej Kramarić	7	4	–	11
5	(Czech Republic) Miroslav Slepička	4	3	1	8
6	(Croatia) Ilija Sivonjić ^{A}	6	1	–	7
6	(Brazil) Sammir	5	1	1	7
8	(Greece) Dimitrios Papadopoulos ^{B}	2	1	2	5
9	(Croatia) Tomislav Barbarić	4	–	–	4
10	(Brazil) Dodô ^{E}	3	–	–	3
11	(Croatia) Ivan Tomečak	1	–	1	2
10	(Croatia) Igor Bišćan	–	–	1	1
10	(Croatia) Dejan Lovren ^{C}	–	–	1	1
10	(Croatia) Ivica Vrdoljak	–	–	1	1
10	(Argentina) Luis Ibáñez	–	1	–	1
10	(Cameroon) Mathias Chago ^{D}	–	1	–	1

Source: Competitive matches
A: Sivonjić was loaned out to Inter Zaprešić in the winter transfer period.
B: Papadopoulos' contract was terminated just before the winter break, after which he signed for Celta Vigo.
C: Lovren was transferred out to Lyon in January 2010.
D: Chago was loaned out to Istra 1961 in the winter transfer period.
E: Dodo was brought in from Inter Zaprešić in the winter transfer period.

== Notes ==
1. ^{a} : Second leg of the UEFA Champions League second qualifying round against Pyunik had to be played behind closed doors due to unruly behaviour by Dinamo supporters at their last European away match against Udinese
