= 2008–09 NK Dinamo Zagreb season =

Dinamo Zagreb
2008–09 season
- Chairman: Mirko Barišić
- Manager: Branko Ivanković (until 24 November 2008); Marijan Vlak (until 5 March 2009); Krunoslav Jurčić
- Prva HNL: 1st
- Croatian Cup: Winners
- UEFA Champions League: Third qualifying round
- UEFA Cup: Group stage
- Top goalscorer: League: Mario Mandžukić (16); All: Mario Mandžukić (24)
- Highest home attendance: 27,000 - v Slaven Belupo, 17 May, Prva HNL
- Lowest home attendance: 400 - v Zadar, 23 November, Prva HNL

This article shows statistics of individual players for the football club Dinamo Zagreb It also lists all matches that Dinamo Zagreb will play in the 2008–09 season.

== Events ==
- 26 April: Midfielder Luka Modrić agrees to a five-year contract with Premier League club Tottenham Hotspur in a transfer worth €21m, meaning he will leave Dinamo after the last game of the 2007–08 season, the Croatian Cup second leg final on 14 May.
- 9 May: Dinamo board of directors hold a press conference concerning the Zagreb Mayor Milan Bandić's announcement that the Maksimir stadium could be torn down and replaced by a new stadium built at a different location. Club's chairman Mirko Barišić, club's legends Slaven Zambata and Igor Cvitanović as well as the current vice-captain Igor Bišćan and Bad Blue Boys spokesman all express the view that the new stadium should be built in Maksimir.
- 14 May: Immediately after the cup final game against Hajduk Split at Poljud stadium, manager Zvonimir Soldo resigns, citing "bad atmosphere at the club".
- 20 May: Branko Ivanković appointed as manager again, only five months after being sacked and replaced by Zvonimir Soldo.
- 21 May: Defender Hrvoje Čale signs a four-year contract with the Turkish club Trabzonspor in a transfer worth €2.2m.
- 23 May: Goalkeeper Tomislav Butina signs a two-year contract with Dinamo on a free transfer after being released from Greek club Olympiacos. Butina returns to the club after spending five years playing abroad, and 15 years after his first top-flight debut for the Blues in 1993.
- 25 May: Defensive midfielder Ognjen Vukojević signs a five-year contract with Ukrainian club Dynamo Kyiv on a transfer worth €6m.
- 4 June: Attacking midfielder Guillermo Suárez signs for Dinamo from Argentina's Tigre for an undisclosed fee.
- 5 June: Defender Etto agrees to a new four-year contract with Dinamo.
- 5 June: The 6th edition of the annual Mladen Ramljak Memorial Tournament hosted by Dinamo begins, featuring youth squads from Croatia and abroad. Dinamo youngsters beat Bulgarian side Litex Lovech 3–1.
- 6 June: UEFA commission inspect all venues expected to host the following Prva HNL season games and assigns Maksimir stadium a category 3 rating, declaring it fit to host European games.
- 6 June: Dinamo youth squad beats Osijek 4–1 and secures a place in the tournament final.
- 6 June: Forward Davor Vugrinec agrees to leave the club for local rivals NK Zagreb on a free transfer.
- 8 June: Dinamo youngsters win the Mladen Ramljak Memorial by beating Hajduk Split 1–0.
- 12 June: Dinamo sign midfielder Pedro Morales from Universidad de Chile for €1.6m.
- 13 June: Dinamo sign defender Luis Ibáñez from Boca Juniors on a five-year contract in a transfer worth for €650,000.
- 15 June: Goalkeeper Georg Koch is released and joins Austrian club Rapid Vienna on a free transfer.
- 3 July: Fearing hooliganism, Austrian organisers cancel the already scheduled pre-season friendly with Polish side Lech Poznań.
- 4 July: Two months after Newcastle United offered €2m for Josip Tadić, West Ham also expresses interest in bringing in the young striker.
- 5 July: Defender Marijan Buljat is released and joins rivals Hajduk Split on a four-year contract.
- 8 July: Forward Dario Zahora's loan to Domžale expires and agrees to a new loan to another Slovenian club Interblock Ljubljana.
- 15 July: Defender Tomislav Mikulić leaves the club and signs a two-year contract with Belgian club Standard Liège.
- 16 July: Dinamo start their European campaign by defeating Linfield 2–0 in the first leg of their UEFA Champions League 2008–09 First Qualifying Round.

== First-team squad ==
=== Team roster ===
Updated 5 March 2009 Note: Flags indicate national team as defined under FIFA eligibility rules; some limited exceptions apply. Players may hold more than one non-FIFA nationality.

No.	Pos.	Nation	Player
1	GK	CRO	Tomislav Butina
2	DF	CRO	Ivan Tomečak
3	DF	ARG	Luis Ibáñez
4	DF	CRO	Robert Kovač
5	MF	ARG	Adrián Calello
6	DF	CRO	Dejan Lovren
7	DF	BRA	Etto
8	MF	CRO	Ante Tomić
10	MF	BRA	Sammir
11	FW	CRO	Josip Tadić
12	GK	CRO	Ivan Kelava

No.	Pos.	Nation	Player
13	MF	CMR	Mathias Chago
16	MF	CRO	Milan Badelj
17	FW	CRO	Mario Mandžukić
18	MF	BIH	Mirko Hrgović
19	DF	CRO	Tomislav Barbarić
20	FW	CZE	Miroslav Slepička
21	MF	CRO	Ivica Vrdoljak
22	DF	CRO	Igor Bišćan (captain)
24	FW	CRO	Ilija Sivonjić
30	GK	CRO	Filip Lončarić
77	MF	CHI	Pedro Morales

=== Transfers ===
==== Summer ====
Midfielder Luka Modrić agreed to a five-year contract with Premier League club Tottenham Hotspur in a transfer worth €21m in late April, meaning his last game for the Croatian Cup second leg final on 14 May. On 22 May defender Hrvoje Čale signed a four-year contract with the Turkish side Trabzonspor for €2.2m, and four days later defensive midfielder Ognjen Vukojević joined Ukrainian giants Dynamo Kyiv in a €6m transfer. During the summer transfer window, a group of players were released, including 33-year-old forward Davor Vugrinec who joins city rivals NK Zagreb, Georg Koch who signs a deal with Rapid Vienna and Tomislav Mikulić who signs a two-year contract with Standard Liège. Marijan Buljat and Dario Jertec were also released after failing to break into the first team squad under Branko Ivanković, and join biggest local rivals, Hajduk Split.

As for the arrivals, goalkeeper Tomislav Butina signed a two-year deal after being released by Olympiacos. Butina signed a two-year deal after being released by the Greek powerhouse, in a transfer which marked his return to the club after spending five years playing abroad, and 15 years after his first top-flight debut for the Blues in 1993. Heart of Hajduk Award winner Mirko Hrgović also joined the club from Japanese side JEF United, in a transfer which stirred some resentment by supporters of both Hajduk and Dinamo. Three South American players also joined the club in the summer transfer window: Luis Ibáñez and Guillermo Suárez came from Argentina's Boca Juniors and Tigre for €650,000 and €1m respectively, while Chilean international Pedro Morales joined from Universidad de Chile in a €1.6m transfer.

Did'dy Guela also left the club in late August amid heavy criticism by Ivanković and a publicized conflict with Ante Tomić in training. Two months after his contract was terminated he joined Greek side AEL.

In

Date	Pos	Player	From	Fee
	GK	(Croatia) Tomislav Butina	(Greece) Olympiacos	Free
	MF	(Bosnia and Herzegovina) Mirko Hrgović	(Japan) JEF United	Free
	DF	(Argentina) Luis Ibáñez	(Argentina) Boca Juniors	€650,000
11 June 2008	MF	(Chile) Pedro Morales	Universidad de Chile	€1,600,000
	MF	(Argentina) Guillermo Suárez	(Argentina) Tigre	€1,000,000

Out

Date	Pos	Player	To	Fee
	MF	(Croatia) Dario Jertec	(Croatia) Hajduk Split	Free
	DF	(Croatia) Marijan Buljat	(Croatia) Hajduk Split	Free
	GK	(Germany) Georg Koch	(Austria) Rapid Vienna	Free
	GK	(Croatia) Tomislav Vranjić	(Greece) AEL	Free
	FW	(Croatia) Davor Vugrinec	(Croatia) NK Zagreb	Free
	DF	(Croatia) Tomislav Mikulić	(Belgium) Standard Liège	Undisclosed
	MF	(Croatia) Ognjen Vukojević	(Ukraine) Dynamo Kyiv	€6,000,000
	DF	(Croatia) Hrvoje Čale	(Turkey) Trabzonspor	€2,200,000
	MF	(Croatia) Luka Modrić	(England) Totenham Hotspur	€21,000,000
	MF	(Ivory Coast) Did'dy Guela	(Greece) AEL	Free

==== Winter ====
On 15 December 2008, Dinamo executive Zdravko Mamić and sports director Zoran Mamić agreed on a 5 1/2-year deal with Adrián Calello signed from Argentina's Independiente. The following two signings were confirmed a few days later, in the form of forwards Miroslav Slepička, who signed from Sparta Prague a 3 1/2-year deal worth €1.5m, and the 21-year-old Ilija Sivonjić from the local side Inter Zaprešić. In late December it was announced that Mihael Mikić left the club to join the Japanese side Sanfrecce Hiroshima for €800,000. The last player to arrive in the winter transfer window was the 34-year-old Croatian international Robert Kovač, who signed from Borussia Dortmund for €500,000.

Six youth players also signed their first senior contracts, out of which only Ivan Tomečak joined the first team squad, while the rest were loaned to NK Lokomotiva, Dinamo's feeder club.

Additionally, Dario Zahora, the 26-year-old Croatian forward who spent the last couple of seasons on loan spells at Slovenian sides Domžale and Interblock Ljubljana, joined Norwegian powerhouse Rosenborg for €280,000 in March 2009.

Defender Dino Drpić, a product of Dinamo's youth academy and a permanent member of the first team squad since 2000, was abruptly suspended in January 2009, for "poor disciplinary record". He was removed from the first team and soon loaned out to German side Karlsruher SC. It was announced on 21 May 2009 that Karlsruhe bought Drpić's contract for €900,000, with the German side trailing at the bottom of the league table with just one match left to play.

In

Date	Pos	Player	From	Fee
15 December 2008	MF	(Argentina) Adrián Calello	(Argentina) Independiente	€2,200,000
18 December 2008	FW	(Czech Republic) Miroslav Slepička	(Czech Republic) Sparta Prague	€1,500,000
18 December 2008	FW	(Croatia) Ilija Sivonjić	(Croatia) Inter Zaprešić	€450,000
29 January 2009	DF	(Croatia) Robert Kovač	(Germany) Borussia Dortmund	€450,000

Out

Date	Pos	Player	To	Fee
23 December 2008	MF	(Croatia) Mihael Mikić	(Japan) Sanfrecce Hiroshima	€800,000
13 March 2009	FW	(Croatia) Dario Zahora	(Norway) Rosenborg	€280,000
	FW	(Croatia) Tomislav Šokota	(Belgium) Lokeren	Free transfer
	FW	(Croatia) Boško Balaban	(Greece) Panionios	Free transfer
21 May 2009	DF	(Croatia) Dino Drpić	(Germany) Karlsruhe	€900,000

== Club ==
=== Coaching staff ===
Position	Staff
Manager	(Croatia) Krunoslav Jurčić
Assistant manager	(Croatia) Hrvoje Braović
Assistant manager	(Croatia) Boris Kubla
Goalkeeping coach	(Croatia) Mario Jozić
Fitness coach	(Croatia) Miljenko Rak

=== Kit ===
Supplier: Diadora
Sponsor(s): INA, Privredna banka Zagreb, Večernji list

Domestic; Home	Domestic; Away	European; Matches

Last updated: 13 April.
Source: Sportnet.hr

== Competitions ==
=== Overview ===
Competition	Started round	Current position / round	Final position / round	First match	Last Match
Prva HNL	–	–	1st	27 July	31 May
UEFA Champions League	QR1	–	QR3	16 July	27 August
UEFA Cup	R1	–	Group stage	18 September	3 December
Croatian Cup	First round	–	Winners	8 October	28 May

=== 1. HNL ===
==== League table ====
Pos	Team	Pld	W	D	L	GF	GA	GD	Pts	Qualification or relegation
1	Dinamo Zagreb (C)	33	23	5	5	71	26	+45	74	Qualification to Champions League second qualifying round
2	Hajduk Split	33	21	5	7	59	25	+34	68	Qualification to Europa League third qualifying round
3	Rijeka	33	17	5	11	50	44	+6	56	Qualification to Europa League second qualifying round
4	Slaven Belupo	33	16	7	10	46	39	+7	55	Qualification to Europa League first qualifying round (Note: Because both cup finalists, Dinamo and Hajduk, qualified for Europe through their league positions, all three UEFA Europa League spots were given to teams according to their league positions, what means that fourth-placed Slaven Belupo also earned a spot in Europa League.)
5	NK Zagreb	33	13	8	12	38	39	−1	47	

Source: Sportnet.hr
Rules for classification: 1) points; 2) goal difference; 3) number of goals scored.
(C) Champions

==== Results summary ====
Overall								Home						Away					
Pld	W	D	L	GF	GA	GD	Pts	W	D	L	GF	GA	GD	W	D	L	GF	GA	GD
33	23	5	5	71	26	+45	74	14	1	2	38	7	+31	9	4	3	33	19	+14

Last updated: 31 May.
Source: Sportnet.hr

==== Results by round ====
Round	1	2	3	4	5	6	7	8	9	10	11	12	13	14	15	16	17	18	19	20	21	22	23	24	25	26	27	28	29	30	31	32	33
Ground	H	H	A	H	A	H	A	H	A	H	A	A	A	H	A	H	A	H	A	H	A	H	H	A	H	A	H	A	H	A	H	H	A
Result	W	W	W	W	W	W	D	L	L	W	D	L	W	W	D	W	W	W	L	W	W	W	D	W	W	W	W	W	W	W	W	L	D

Updated to match(es) played on 31 May. Source: Competitive matches
A = Away; H = Home; W = Win; D = Draw; L = Loss

==== Matches ====
27 July 2008 Matchday 1	Dinamo Zagreb	2–0	Rijeka	Zagreb
20:10	Badelj 82'; Balaban 90'	Report		Stadium: Stadion Maksimir; Attendance: 6,000; Referee: Domagoj Ljubičić (Osijek)

3 August 2008 Matchday 2	Dinamo Zagreb	3–1	Inter Zaprešić	Zagreb
20:00	Sammir 2'; Tadić 63'; Tomić 90'	Report		Stadium: Stadion Maksimir; Attendance: 2,000; Referee: Draženko Kovačić (Križevci)

9 August 2008 Matchday 3	Croatia Sesvete	0–1	Dinamo Zagreb	Velika
20:00		Report	Morales 28'	Stadium: Stadion Kamen Ingrad; Attendance: 7,500; Referee: Dalibor Mlakar (Zagreb)

17 August 2008 Matchday 4	Dinamo Zagreb	6–0	Cibalia	Zagreb
20:00	Mandžukić 5', 18', 81'; Tadić 33'; Sammir 40'; Badelj 75'	Report		Stadium: Stadion Maksimir; Attendance: 2,000; Referee: Jurica Mihalj (Velika Mlaka)

23 August 2008 Matchday 5	Zadar	2–3	Dinamo Zagreb	Zadar
20:05	Župan 20' (pen.); Terkeš 32'	Report	Balaban 55', 71'; Mandžukić 61'	Stadium: Stadion Stanovi; Attendance: 4,000; Referee: Damir Batinić (Osijek)

31 August 2008 Matchday 6	Dinamo Zagreb	2–1	Varteks	Zagreb
20:00	Morales 22', 55'	Report	Brezovec 69'	Stadium: Stadion Maksimir; Attendance: 1,000; Referee: Edi Šunjić (Split)

14 September 2008 Matchday 7	NK Zagreb	2–2	Dinamo Zagreb	Zagreb
20:10	Parlov 33' (pen.); Pejić 83'	Report	Balaban 24' (pen.); Mandžukić 52'	Stadium: Stadion Kranjčevićeva; Attendance: 2,000; Referee: Dalibor Mlakar (Zagreb)

21 September 2008 Matchday 8	Dinamo Zagreb	0–2	Hajduk Split	Zagreb
20:15		Report	Gabrić 51'; Ibričić 76'	Stadium: Stadion Maksimir; Attendance: 8,000; Referee: Vlado Svilokos (Sisak)

26 September 2008 Matchday 9	Slaven Belupo	2–0	Dinamo Zagreb	Koprivnica
20:00	Vručina 22', 82'	Report		Stadium: Gradski stadion Attendance: 3,000; Referee: Domagoj Ljubičić (Osijek)

5 October 2008 Matchday 10	Dinamo Zagreb	1–0	Osijek	Zagreb
20:15	Lovren 1'	Report		Stadium: Stadion Maksimir; Attendance: 1,500; Referee: Draženko Kovačić (Križevci)

19 October 2008 Matchday 11	Šibenik	2–2	Dinamo Zagreb	Šibenik
20:15	Zec 16', 34'	Report	Tadić 43'; Ibáñez 85'	Stadium: Stadion Šubićevac; Attendance: 5,000; Referee: Zlatko Šimčić (Koprivnica)

2 November 2008 Matchday 13	Inter Zaprešić	1–3	Dinamo Zagreb	Zaprešić
15:30	Bule 2'	Report	Mandžukić 11'; Vrdoljak 19'; Morales 45'	Stadium: ŠRC Zaprešić; Attendance: 2,500; Referee: Igor Križarić (Čakovec)

9 November 2008 Matchday 14	Dinamo Zagreb	6–1	Croatia Sesvete	Zagreb
15:30	Morales 26', 45' (pen.), 62'; Tadić 29'; Mandžukić 35'; Etto 85'	Report	Čižmek 72'	Stadium: Stadion Maksimir; Attendance: 1,000; Referee: Edi Šunjić (Split)

16 November 2008 Matchday 15	Cibalia	1–1	Dinamo Zagreb	Vinkovci
15:30	Pavličić 40'	Report	Sammir 53'	Stadium: Stadion HNK Cibalia; Attendance: 5,000; Referee: Vlado Svilokos (Sisak)

19 November 2008 Matchday 12	Rijeka	1–0	Dinamo Zagreb	Rijeka
20:30	Sharbini 17'	Report		Stadium: Stadion Kantrida; Attendance: 3,500; Referee: Vlado Svilokos (Sisak)

23 November 2008 Matchday 16	Dinamo Zagreb	2–0	Zadar	Zagreb
15:30	Hrgović 70'; Šokota 90'	Report		Stadium: Stadion Maksimir; Attendance: 400; Referee: Andrej Burilo (Osijek)

30 November 2008 Matchday 17	Varteks	0–1	Dinamo Zagreb	Varaždin
20:15		Report	Balaban 70'	Stadium: Stadion Varteks; Attendance: 2,000; Referee: Ante Vučemilović (Osijek)

7 December 2008 Matchday 18	Dinamo Zagreb	3–1	NK Zagreb	Zagreb
15:30	Balaban 28'; Sammir 55'; Mandžukić 64'	Report	Vugrinec 83'	Stadium: Stadion Maksimir; Attendance: 758; Referee: Bruno Marić (Daruvar)

22 February 2009 Matchday 19	Hajduk Split	2–0	Dinamo Zagreb	Split
20:15	Kalinić 45+2' (pen.); Ibričić 51'	Report		Stadium: Stadion Poljud; Attendance: 38,000; Referee: Ivan Bebek (Rijeka)

1 March 2009 Matchday 20	Dinamo Zagreb	1–0	Slaven Belupo	Zagreb
20:15	Sammir 18'	Report		Stadium: Stadion Maksimir; Attendance: 3,000; Referee: Bruno Marić (Daruvar)

8 March 2009 Matchday 21	Osijek	0–2	Dinamo Zagreb	Osijek
20:15		Report	Sammir 15' (pen.); Vrdoljak 72'	Stadium: Stadion Gradski vrt Attendance: 8,000; Referee: Alen Gerek (Zabok)

15 March 2009 Matchday 22	Dinamo Zagreb	3–0	Šibenik	Zagreb
15:30	Sivonjić 13'; Vrdoljak 34'; Mandžukić 76'	Report		Stadium: Stadion Maksimir; Attendance: 7,000; Referee: Draženko Kovačić (Križevci)

22 March 2009 Matchday 23	Dinamo Zagreb	0–0	Osijek	Zagreb
15:30		Report		Stadium: Stadion Maksimir; Attendance: 7,000; Referee: Zlatko Šimčić (Koprivnica)

5 April 2009 Matchday 24	Cibalia	3–4	Dinamo Zagreb	Vinkovci
20:15	Malčić 49' (pen.); Pavličić 71'; Lukačević 84'	Report	Tomečak 74', 79'; Sivonjić 82', 88'	Stadium: Stadion HNK Cibalia; Attendance: 6,000; Referee: Bruno Marić (Daruvar)

11 April 2009 Matchday 25	Dinamo Zagreb	1–0	Inter Zaprešić	Zagreb
16:30	Mandžukić 81'	Report		Stadium: Stadion Maksimir; Attendance: 9,000; Referee: Edi Šunjić (Split)

19 April 2009 Matchday 26	Croatia Sesvete	0–4	Dinamo Zagreb	Zagreb
16:30		Report	Slepička 30', 35', 45'; Tomečak 65'	Stadium: Stadion ŠRC Sesvete; Attendance: 3,000; Referee: Draženko Kovačić (Križevci)

22 April 2009 Matchday 27	Dinamo Zagreb	2–0	Zadar	Zagreb
20:15	Bišćan 57'; Mandžukić 90'	Report		Stadium: Stadion Maksimir; Attendance: 4,500; Referee: Ante Vučemilović (Osijek)

26 April 2009 Matchday 28	Varteks	1–6	Dinamo Zagreb	Varaždin
20:15	Smrekar 38'	Report	Mandžukić 19', 74'; Slepička 40', 63', 89'; Hrgović 61'	Stadium: Stadion Varteks; Attendance: 6,000; Referee: Draženko Kovačić (Križevci)

3 May 2009 Matchday 29	Dinamo Zagreb	4–0	Rijeka	Zagreb
16:30	Badelj 23', 54'; Sammir 63'; Chago 77'	Report		Stadium: Stadion Maksimir; Attendance: 10,000; Referee: Edi Šunjić (Split)

10 May 2009 Matchday 30	Šibenik	0–2	Dinamo Zagreb	Šibenik
16:30		Report	Mandžukić 32'; Tomečak 52'	Stadium: Stadion Šubićevac; Attendance: 5,000; Referee: Alen Gerek (Zabok)

17 May 2009 Matchday 31	Dinamo Zagreb	2–0	Slaven Belupo	Zagreb
20:00	Sammir 10' (pen.); Mandžukić 52'	Report		Stadium: Stadion Maksimir; Attendance: 25,000; Referee: Domagoj Ljubičić (Osijek)

24 May 2009 Matchday 32	Dinamo Zagreb	0–1	NK Zagreb	Zagreb
20:15		Report	Vugrinec 76'	Stadium: Stadion Maksimir; Attendance: 12,000; Referee: Dalibor Mlakar (Zagreb)

31 May 2009 Matchday 33	Hajduk Split	2–2	Dinamo Zagreb	Split
20:15	Ibričić 67'; Vukušić 81'	Report	Chago 8'; Mandžukić 14'	Stadium: Stadion Poljud; Attendance: 10,000; Referee: Andrej Burilo (Osijek)

=== Croatian Cup ===
8 October 2008 First round	Gaj Mače	1–5	Dinamo Zagreb	Mače
15:30		Report

29 October 2008 Second round	Hrvatski Dragovoljac	0–6	Dinamo Zagreb	Zagreb

12 November 2008 Quarter-final 1st leg	Zagora Unešić	1–2	Dinamo Zagreb	Unešić
				Attendance: 6,000

10 December 2008 Quarter-final 2nd leg	Dinamo Zagreb	5–1 (7–2 agg.)	Zagora Unešić	Zagreb
				Attendance: 1,000

4 March 2009 Semi-final 1st leg	NK Zagreb	0–2	Dinamo Zagreb	Zagreb
				Attendance: 2,500

18 March 2009 Semi-final 2nd leg	Dinamo Zagreb	4–1 (6–1 agg.)	NK Zagreb	Zagreb
				Attendance: 1,000

13 May 2009 Final 1st leg	Dinamo Zagreb	3–0	Hajduk Split	Zagreb
				Attendance: 20,000

28 May 2009 Final 2nd leg	Hajduk Split	3–0 (3–3 agg.) (3–4 p)	Dinamo Zagreb	Split
				Attendance: 18,000

=== UEFA Champions League ===
16 July 2008 First qualifying round	Linfield (Northern Ireland)	0–2	(Croatia) Dinamo Zagreb	Belfast
20:45		Report	Mandžukić 19'; Drpić 90'	Stadium: Windsor Park; Attendance: 2,900; Referee: Thomas Vejlgaard (Denmark)

23 July 2008 First qualifying round	Dinamo Zagreb (Croatia)	1–1	(Northern Ireland) Linfield	Zagreb
20:45	Mandžukić 3'	Report	Gault 53'	Stadium: Stadion Maksimir; Attendance: 2,835; Referee: Alfonso Pérez Burrull (Spain)

30 July 2008 Second qualifying round	Domžale (Slovenia)	0–3	(Croatia) Dinamo Zagreb	Domžale
20:45		Report	Vrdoljak 11'; Sammir 21' (pen.); Tadić 40'	Stadium: Športni park Attendance: 2,180; Referee: Tony Asumaa (Finland)

23 July 2008 Second qualifying round	Dinamo Zagreb (Croatia)	3–2	(Slovenia) Domžale	Zagreb
20:45	Bišćan 17'; Hrgović 50'; Drpić 84'	Report	Brezič 29'; Zec 81'	Stadium: Stadion Maksimir; Attendance: 4,280; Referee: William Collum (Scotland)

13 August 2008 Third qualifying round	Shakhtar Donetsk (Ukraine)	2–0	(Croatia) Dinamo Zagreb	Donetsk
19:00	Srna 3'; Jádson 31'	Report		Stadium: RSC Olimpiyskiy; Attendance: 24,810; Referee: Florian Meyer (Germany)

27 August 2008 Third qualifying round	Dinamo Zagreb (Croatia)	1–3	(Ukraine) Shakhtar Donetsk	Zagreb
20:45	Balaban 57'	Report	Luiz Adriano 42'; Brandão 59'; Willian 70'	Stadium: Stadion Maksimir; Attendance: 13,655; Referee: Mike Riley (England)

=== UEFA Cup ===
==== Classification ====
Pos	Team	Pld	W	D	L	GF	GA	GD	Pts	Qualification	UDI	TOT	NEC	SPA	DZ
1	(Italy) Udinese	4	3	0	1	6	4	+2	9	Advance to knockout stage	—	2–0	—	—	2–1
2	(England) Tottenham Hotspur	4	2	1	1	7	4	+3	7	Advance to knockout stage	—	—	—	2–2	4–0
3	(Netherlands) NEC	4	2	0	2	6	5	+1	6	Advance to knockout stage	2–0	0–1	—	—	—
4	(Russia) Spartak Moscow	4	1	1	2	5	6	−1	4		1–2	—	1–2	—	—
5	(Croatia) Dinamo Zagreb	4	1	0	3	4	9	−5	3		—	—	3–2	0–1	—

Source: RSSSF

== Matches ==
=== Competitive ===
Match	Date	Tournament	Round	Ground	Opponent	Score	Attendance	Dinamo Scorers	Report
1	16 July	Champions League	QR1	A (Northern Ireland)	Linfield (Northern Ireland)	2 – 0	4,000	Mandžukić, Drpić	uefa.com
2	23 July	Champions League	QR1	H	Linfield (Northern Ireland)	1 – 1	2,000	Mandžukić	uefa.com
3	27 July	Prva HNL	1	H	Rijeka	2 – 0	6,000	Badelj, Balaban	sportnet.hr
4	30 July	Champions League	QR2	A (Slovenia)	Domžale (Slovenia)	3 – 0	2,500	Vrdoljak, Sammir, Tadić	uefa.com
5	3 August	Prva HNL	2	H	Inter Zaprešić	3 – 1	2,000	Sammir, Tadić, Tomić	sportnet.hr
6	6 August	Champions League	QR2	H	Domžale (Slovenia)	3 – 2	8,000	Bišćan, Hrgović, Drpić	uefa.com
7	9 August	Prva HNL	3	AR	Croatia Sesvete	1 – 0	7,500	Morales	sportnet.hr
8	13 August	Champions League	QR3	A (Ukraine)	Shakhtar Donetsk (Ukraine)	0 – 2			uefa.com
9	17 August	Prva HNL	4	H	Cibalia	6 – 0	2,000	Mandžukić (3), Tadić, Sammir, Badelj	sportnet.hr
10	23 August	Prva HNL	5	A	Zadar	3 – 2	4,000	Balaban (2), Mandžukić	sportnet.hr
11	27 August	Champions League	QR3	H	Shakhtar Donetsk (Ukraine)	1 – 3	18,000	Balaban	uefa.com
12	31 August	Prva HNL	6	H	Varteks	2 – 1	1,000	Morales (2)	
13	14 September	Prva HNL	7	A	NK Zagreb	2 – 2	2,000	Balaban, Mandžukić	
14	18 September	UEFA Cup	R1	H	Sparta Prague (Czech Republic)	0 – 0			
15	21 September	Prva HNL	8	H	Hajduk Split	0 – 2	8,000		
16	26 September	Prva HNL	9	A	Slaven Belupo	0 – 2	3,000		
17	2 October	UEFA Cup	R1	A (Czech Republic)	Sparta Prague (Czech Republic)	3 – 3		Morales, Lovren, Badelj	
18	5 October	Prva HNL	10	H	Osijek	1 – 0	1,500	Lovren	
19	8 October	Croatian Cup	1st round	A	NK Gaj Mače	5 – 1		Balaban, Sammir, Badelj, Šokota, Bišćan	
20	19 October	Prva HNL	11	A	Šibenik	2 – 2	5,000	Tadić, Ibáñez	
21	23 October	UEFA Cup	Group stage	H	NEC Nijmegen (Netherlands)	3 – 2	15,000	Mandžukić, Balaban, Vrdoljak	
22	29 October	Croatian Cup	2nd round	A	Hrvatski Dragovoljac	6 – 0	2,000	Balaban (3), Ibáñez, Sammir, Tadić	
23	2 November	Prva HNL	13	A	Inter Zaprešić	3 – 1	2,500	Mandžukić, Vrdoljak, Morales	
24	6 November	UEFA Cup	Group stage	A (England)	Tottenham Hotspur (England)	0 – 4	16,295		
25	9 November	Prva HNL	14	H	Croatia Sesvete	6 – 1	1,000	Morales (3), Tadić, Mandžukić, Etto	
26	12 November	Croatian Cup	Quarterfinal	A	Zagora Unešić	2 – 1	6,000	Šokota, Mikić	
27	16 November	Prva HNL	15	A	Cibalia	1 – 1	5,000	Sammir	
28	19 November	Prva HNL	12*	A	Rijeka	0 – 1	3,500		
29	23 November	Prva HNL	16	H	Zadar	2 – 0	400	Hrgović, Šokota	
30	27 November	UEFA Cup	Group stage	H	Spartak Moscow (Russia)	0 – 1	15,000		
31	30 November	Prva HNL	17	A	Varteks	1 – 0	2,000	Balaban	
32	3 December	UEFA Cup	Group stage	A (Italy)	Udinese (Italy)	1 – 2	15,000	Bišćan	
33	7 December	Prva HNL	18	H	NK Zagreb	3 – 1	758	Balaban, Sammir, Mandžukić	
34	10 December	Croatian Cup	Quarterfinal	H	Zagora Unešić	5 – 1	1,000	Tomić, Lovren, Tadić (2), Šokota	
35	22 February	Prva HNL	19	A	Hajduk Split	0 – 2	35,000		
36	1 March	Prva HNL	20	H	Slaven Belupo	1 – 0	2,500	Sammir	
37	4 March	Croatian Cup	Semifinal	A	NK Zagreb	2 – 0	2,500	Sivonjić, Morales	
38	8 March	Prva HNL	21	A	Osijek	2 – 0	8,000	Sammir, Vrdoljak	
39	15 March	Prva HNL	22	H	Šibenik	3 – 0	5,000	Sivonjić, Vrdoljak, Mandžukić	
40	18 March	Croatian Cup	Semifinal	H	NK Zagreb	4 – 1	1,000	Mandžukić (3), Morales	
41	22 March	Prva HNL	23	H	Osijek	0 – 0	7,000		
42	5 April	Prva HNL	24	A	Cibalia	4 – 3	6,000	Tomečak (2), Sivonjić (2)	
43	11 April	Prva HNL	25	H	Inter Zaprešić	1 – 0	9,000	Mandžukić	
44	19 April	Prva HNL	26	AR	Croatia Sesvete	4 – 0	3,000	Slepička (3), Tomečak	
45	22 April	Prva HNL	27	H	Zadar	2 – 0	6,000	Bišćan, Mandžukić	
46	26 April	Prva HNL	28	A	Varteks	6 – 1	6,000	Mandžukić (2), Slepička (3), Hrgović	
47	3 May	Prva HNL	29	H	Rijeka	4 – 0	9,000	Badelj (2), Sammir, Chago	
48	10 May	Prva HNL	30	A	Šibenik	2 – 0	5,000	Mandžukić, Tomečak	
49	13 May	Croatian Cup	Final	H	Hajduk Split	3 – 0	20,000	Mandžukić (2), Sammir	
50	17 May	Prva HNL	31	H	Slaven Belupo	2 – 0	27,000	Sammir, Mandžukić	sportnet.hr
51	24 May	Prva HNL	32	H	NK Zagreb	0 – 1	12,000		sportnet.hr
52	28 May	Croatian Cup	Final	A	Hajduk Split	0 – 3 (4 – 3 p)	18,000		
53	31 May	Prva HNL	33	A	Hajduk Split	2 – 2	10,000	Chago, Mandžukić	sportnet.hr

Last updated 31 May 2009
Sources: Sportske novosti, Sportnet.hr

=== Friendlies ===
Match	Date	Tournament	Round	Ground	Opponent	Score	Dinamo Scorers
1	29 June	Friendly	N/A	N (Slovenia)	Interblock Ljubljana (Slovenia)	0 – 0	
2	2 July	Friendly	N/A	A (Slovenia)	Mura 05 (Slovenia)	0 – 1	
3	8 July	Friendly	N/A	HR	Olimpija Ljubljana (Slovenia)	4 – 1	Morales, Chago, Tadić, Tomić
4	3 September	Friendly	N/A	A	Zagorec	4 – 2	Balaban, Šokota, Krpić, Ibáñez
5	8 September	Friendly	N/A	A	Hrvatski Dragovoljac	3 – 1	Šokota (2), Tadić
6	18 January	Friendly	N/A	A	Junak Sinj	3 – 0	Vrdoljak, Balaban, Sivonjić
7	23 January	Gabela Tournament	Semifinal	A (Bosnia and Herzegovina)	GOŠK Gabela (Bosnia and Herzegovina)	3 – 1	Šokota, Sivonjić, Tadić
8	24 January	Gabela Tournament	Final	N (Bosnia and Herzegovina)	NK Osijek	0 – 0	
9	27 January	Friendly	N/A	HR	Fehérvár (Hungary)	1 – 0	Šokota
10	1 February	Friendly	N/A	N (Turkey)	Bełchatów (Poland)	2 – 2	Bišćan, Tomić
11	4 February	Friendly	N/A	N (Turkey)	Teplice (Czech Republic)	1 – 0	Tadić
12	7 February	Friendly	N/A	N (Turkey)	Sanfrecce Hiroshima (Japan)	4 – 3	Morales (2), Mandžukić (2)
13	9 February	Friendly	N/A	N (Turkey)	Litex Lovech (Bulgaria)	0 – 0	
14	14 February	Friendly	N/A	A (Austria)	Red Bull Salzburg (Austria)	4 – 3	Sammir (2), Slepička; Mandžukić
15	17 February	Friendly	N/A	A	NK Lučko	5 – 2	Šokota (2), Badelj; Tadić, Morales
16	25 March	Friendly	N/A	A	NK Ivančica	15 – 0	Slepička (5), Vrdoljak, Etto, Chago, Ibáñez, Tomić (2), Tadić (2), Tomečak (2)
17	7 April	Friendly	N/A	A	NK Križevci	8 – 2	Slepička (4), Mandžukić, Tomečak, Bišćan, Sivonjić

=== HNL Indoor Tournament ===
(All games played at Krešimir Ćosić Arena in Zadar.)

Match	Date	Round	Opponent	Score
1	7 January	1	Inter Zaprešić	4 – 3
2	7 January	2	Zadar	2 – 3
3	9 January	3	NK Zagreb	1 – 2
4	9 January	4	Osijek	4 – 2
5	9 January	5	Varteks	5 – 4
6	10 January	6	Hajduk Split	3 – 4
7	10 January	7	Šibenik	4 – 1
8	10 January	8	Zadar	2 – 3
9	10 January	9	Rijeka	8 – 5
10	10 January	10	NK Zagreb	1 – 2
11	10 January	Semifinal	Hajduk Split	2 – 5
12	10 January	3rd place	NK Zagreb	8 – 6

== Player seasonal records ==
Competitive matches only. Updated to games played 31 May 2009.

Key

Player left the club in mid-season
Player joined the club in mid-season

=== Goalscorers ===
Rank	Name	League	Cup	Europe	Total
1	(Croatia) Mario Mandžukić	16	5	3	24
2	(Croatia) Boško Balaban^{[1]}	6	4	2	12
2	(Brazil) Sammir	8	3	1	12
4	(Chile) Pedro Morales	7	2	1	10
5	(Croatia) Josip Tadić	4	3	1	8
6	(Czech Republic) Miroslav Slepička	6	–	–	6
6	(Croatia) Milan Badelj	4	1	1	6
8	(Croatia) Ivica Vrdoljak	3	–	2	5
9	(Croatia) Ilija Sivonjić^{[3]}	3	1	–	4
9	(Croatia) Tomislav Šokota^{[1]}	1	3	–	4
9	(Croatia) Igor Bišćan	1	1	2	4
9	(Croatia) Ivan Tomečak	4	–	–	4
13	(Croatia) Dejan Lovren	1	1	1	3
13	(Bosnia and Herzegovina) Mirko Hrgović	2	–	1	3
15	(Croatia) Dino Drpić^{[2]}	–	–	2	2
15	(Argentina) Luis Ibáñez	1	1	–	2
15	(Croatia) Ante Tomić	1	1	–	2
15	(Cameroon) Mathias Chago	2	–	–	2
19	(Croatia) Mihael Mikić^{[4]}	–	1	–	1
19	(Brazil) Etto	1	–	–	1

Source: Competitive matches

== Notes ==
1. ^{a} ^{b} : On 5 March 2009 the managing board decided to release both Boško Balaban and Tomo Šokota citing "poor performance".
2. ^{a} : On 13 January the club's management announced that Dino Drpić was to be suspended due to "poor disciplinary record". His contract was terminated and was put on transfer list, and was subsequently loaned to Karlsruher SC.
3. ^{a} : Ilija Sivonjić signed for Dinamo in the winter transfer window from Inter Zaprešić; he scored 8 goals for Inter in the first 18 rounds of the Prva HNL 2008–09 season.
4. ^{a} : Mihael Mikić was released and joined Sanfrecce Hiroshima in the winter transfer window in January 2009.
