= 2011–12 GNK Dinamo Zagreb season =

Dinamo Zagreb
2011–12 season
- Chairman: Mirko Barišić
- Manager: Ante Čačić
- Stadium: Maksimir Stadium
- Prva HNL: 1st
- Croatian Cup: TBD
- UEFA Champions League: Group
- Top goalscorer: TBD
- Highest home attendance: 35,000 v Helsinki 3 August 2011
- Lowest home attendance: 1,300 v Cibalia 30 July 2011
Home colours	Away colours	Third colours

This article shows statistics of individual players and lists all matches that Dinamo Zagreb will play in the 2011–12 season.

Dinamo Zagreb finished first in the league standings to become the league champions.

== Current squad ==
Squad Season 2011–12
-						Prva HNL					Croatian Cup					European Cups					Total				
No.	Player	Nat.	Age	since	previous club	matches	min.	goals	YC	RC	matches	min.	goals	YC	RC	matches	min.	goals	YC	RC	matches	min.	goals	YC	RC
Goalkeepers
12	Filip Lončarić	Croatian	25	2008	Junior Team	2	180	0	0	0	1	90	0	0	0	0	0	0	0	0	3	270	0	0	0
30	Ivan Kelava	Croatian	23	2010	NK Lokomotiva	18	1620	0	0	0	3	270	0	0	0	12	1080	0	0	0	30	2770	0	0	0
31	Oliver Zelenika	Croatian	18	--	Junior Team	0	0	0	0	0	0	0	0	0	0	0	0	0	0	0	0	0	0	0	0
Defenders
3	Luis Ibáñez	Argentinian	23	2008	Boca Juniors	17	1377	6	0	0	2	180	0	0	0	11	990	1	4	0	29	2547	7	4	0
4	Josip Šimunić	Croatian	33	2011	TSG 1899 Hoffenheim	9	544	0	1	0	2	180	2	0	0	3	225	0	1	0	12	949	2	2	0
13	Tonel	Portuguese	31	2010	Sporting Lisboa	12	1035	2	0	0	2	124	0	0	0	10	900	0	2	0	23	1969	2	3	0
14	Šime Vrsaljko	Croatian	19	2008	Junior Team	14	1111	0	0	0	4	278	0	0	0	8	680	0	1	1	26	2079	0	1	1
22	Igor Bišćan (captain)	Croatian	33	2007^{1}	Panathinaikos	3	270	0	1	0	0	0	0	0	0	0	0	0	0	0	3	270	0	1	0
24	Domagoj Vida	Croatian	22	2011	Bayer Leverkusen	20	1685	1	2	0	2	180	0	0	0	12	1054	0	1	0	34	2919	1	3	0
19	Josip Pivarić	Croatian	22	2009	Junior Team	3	270	0	0	0	0	1	90	0	0	0	0	0	0	0	4	360	0	0	0
Midfielders
5	Adrian Calello	Argentinian	24	2009	Independiente	13	1020	0	2	0	1	77	0	0	0	10	659	0	3	0	24	1586	0	5	0
7	Jerko Leko	Croatian	31	2011^{2}	Bucaspor	16	1340	2	7	0	3	180	0	0	0	12	973	0	4	1	31	2293	1	11	1
8	Mateo Kovačić	Croatian	17	2010	Junior Team	19	1388	4	1	0	3	265	0	0	0	12	555	1	0	0	34	2208	5	1	0
10	Sammir (3rd captain)	Brazilian/Croatian	24	2007	Sao Caetano	13	882	2	1	0	1	17	0	0	0	12	1016	3	3	0	26	1919	5	4	0
11	Ivan Tomečak	Croatian	21	2008	Junior Team	10	621	1	1	0	3	185	0	0	0	6	210	1	1	0	19	1026	2	2	0
16	Milan Badelj (vice captain)	Croatian	22	2007	NK Zagreb Youth Team	13	985	1	1	0	2	180	1	0	0	8	720	1	1	0	24	1885	3	2	0
20	Mehmed Alispahić	Bosnian	22	2011	HNK Šibenik	10	532	1	1	0	2	103	1	0	0	6	325	0	2	0	16	960	2	3	0
23	Nikola Pokrivač	Croatian	26	2011^{3}	Red Bull Salzburg	7	426	1	1	0	1	90	0	0	0	4	133	0	1	0	12	649	1	2	0
Forwards
17	Jakub Sylvestr	Slovak	22	2010	ŠK Slovan Bratislava	7	282	0	1	0	4	252	1	1	0	0	0	0	0	0	11	534	1	2	0
21	Fatos Beqiraj	Montenegrian	23	2010	Budućnost	20	1361	11	3	0	2	96	0	0	0	12	716	2	2	0	34	2173	13	5	0
26	Dino Špehar	Croatian	18	2011	NK Osijek	0	0	0	0	0	0	0	0	0	0	0	0	0	0	0	0	0	0	0	0
55	Ante Rukavina	Croatian	25	2010	Panathinaikos	17	1097	4	1	0	2	91	0	0	0	10	522	1	1	0	29	1710	5	2	0
99	Ivan Krstanović	Croatian	28	2011	NK Zagreb	16	859	8	2	0	4	168	1	0	0	6	381	2	1	0	26	1470	11	3	0
On loan
2	Karlo Bručić	Croatian	19	2011	NK Radnik Sesvete	0	0	0	0	0	0	0	0	0	0	0	0	0	0	0	0	0	0	0	0
6	Arijan Ademi	Croatian	20	2010	HNK Šibenik	5	93	0	0	0	1	90	1	0	0	2	116	0	0	0	8	299	1	0	0
77	Pedro Morales	Chilean	26	2008	Universidad de Chile	2	98	1	0	0	2	126	2	0	0	0	0	0	0	0	4	224	3	0	0
18	Mario Šitum	Croatian	19	2010	NK Kustošija	11	400	4	1	0	2	180	1	0	0	5	67	0	1	0	18	647	5	2	0
9	Andrej Kramarić	Croatian	20	2008	Junior Team	1	5	0	0	0	2	180	1	0	0	0	0	0	0	0	3	185	1	0	0
Not in team anymore
19	Tomislav Barbarić	Croatian	22	2009	Junior Team	0	0	0	0	0	1	90	0	0	0	0	0	0	0	0	1	90	0	0	0
25	Leandro Cufre	Argentinian	33	2009	Hertha BSC	10	695	0	1	0	1	90	0	0	0	3	187	0	2	0	14	972	0	3	0
28	Ante Puljić	Croatian	23	2011	NK Lokomotiva	1	18	0	0	0	1	45	0	0	0	0	0	0	0	0	2	63	0	0	0
--	Walid Atta	Swedish	24	2011	NK Lokomotiva	0	0	0	0	0	0	0	0	0	0	0	0	0	0	0	0	0	0	0	0
15	Mathias Chago	Cameroonian	28	2005	Metalac Osijek	0	0	0	0	0	0	0	0	0	0	0	0	0	0	0	0	0	0	0	0
33	Antun Palić	Croatian	23	2011	Inter Zaprešić	1	32	0	0	0	1	45	0	0	0	0	0	0	0	0	2	77	0	0	0
Last updated: 18 March 2012

Sources: Prva-HNL.hr, Sportske novosti, Sportnet.hr,

^{1}Played for Dinamo Zagreb in 1997–2000 ^{2}Played for Dinamo Zagreb in 1999–2003 ^{3}Played for Dinamo Zagreb in 2007–2008

Kramarić, Bručić, Ademi and Šitum loaned to NK Lokomotiva till end of the season. Morales loaned to Universidad de Chile till end of the season.

== Competitions ==
=== Overall ===
Competition	Started round	Final result	First match	Last Match
2011–12 Prva HNL	—N/a		23 July	TBD
2011–12 Croatian Cup	First round	TBD	20 September	TBD
2011–12 UEFA Champions League	QR2	Group	12 July	7 December

=== Prva HNL ===
==== Classification ====
Pos	Team	Pld	W	D	L	GF	GA	GD	Pts	Qualification or relegation
1	Dinamo Zagreb (C)	30	23	6	1	73	11	+62	75	Qualification to Champions League second qualifying round
2	Hajduk Split	30	16	6	8	50	24	+26	54	Qualification to Europa League second qualifying round (Note: Since 2011–12 Croatian Cup winners Dinamo Zagreb qualified for the 2012–13 UEFA Champions League, so cup runners-up Osijek qualified for the 2012–13 UEFA Europa League first qualifying round. Moreover, Slaven Belupo were moved up a round as the cup winner spot was not used.)
3	Slaven Belupo	30	14	10	6	41	27	+14	52	Qualification to Europa League second qualifying round
4	RNK Split	30	14	8	8	43	32	+11	50	
5	Cibalia	30	13	6	11	35	35	0	45	

Source: Sportnet.hr
Rules for classification: 1) points; 2) goal difference; 3) number of goals scored.
For deciding champions, qualification to UEFA Europa League and relegation: 1st points; 2nd head-to-head points; 3rd head-to-head goal difference; 4th head-to-head away goals scored
(C) Champions

==== Results summary ====
Overall								Home						Away					
Pld	W	D	L	GF	GA	GD	Pts	W	D	L	GF	GA	GD	W	D	L	GF	GA	GD
25	21	3	1	64	8	+56	66	12	0	0	33	2	+31	9	3	1	31	6	+25

Last updated: 7 April 2012.
Source: Sportnet.hr

==== Results by round ====
Round	1	2	3	4	5	6	7	8	9	10	11	12	13	14	15	16	17	18	19	20	21	22	23	24	25	26	27	28	29	30
Ground	H	H	A	H	A	H	A	H	A	H	A	H	A	H	A	A	A	H	A	H	A	H	A	H	A	H	A	H	A	H
Result	W	W	W	W	W	W	D	W	W	W	L	W	W	W	W	D	D	W	W	W	W	W	W	W	W	D	D	W	W	D
Position	1	1	1	1	1	1	1	1	1	1	1	1	1	1	1	1	1	1	1	1	1	1	1	1	1	1	1	1	1	1

Updated to match(es) played on 7 April 2012. Source: Competitive matches
A = Away; H = Home; W = Win; D = Draw; L = Loss

==== Results by opponent ====
Team	Results		Points
Team	Home	Away	Points
Cibalia	2–0	2–2	4
Hajduk Split	2–1	1–1	4
Inter Zaprešić	2–0	0–0	4
Istra 1961	4–1	2–0	6
Karlovac	5–0	3–0	6
Lokomotiva	6–0	2–1	6
Lučko	1–0	4–0	6
Osijek	1–0	4–0	6
Rijeka	2–0	1–1	4
Šibenik	2–1	3–0	6
Slaven Belupo	2–0	2–0	6
RNK Split	0–0	3–0	4
Varaždin	7–0	4–0	6
Zadar	1–1	1–2	1
NK Zagreb	1–0	2–1	6

Source: 2011–12 Prva HNL article

=== 2011–12 Champions league ===
==== Group D ====
Pos	Team	Pld	W	D	L	GF	GA	GD	Pts	Qualification	RMA	LYO	AJX	DZG
1	(Spain) Real Madrid	6	6	0	0	19	2	+17	18	Advance to knockout phase	—	4–0	3–0	6–2
2	(France) Lyon	6	2	2	2	9	7	+2	8 (Note: Tied on head-to-head results. Overall goal difference was used as the tiebreaker.)	Advance to knockout phase	0–2	—	0–0	2–0
3	(Netherlands) Ajax	6	2	2	2	6	6	0	8	Transfer to Europa League	0–3	0–0	—	4–0
4	(Croatia) Dinamo Zagreb	6	0	0	6	3	22	−19	0		0–1	1–7	0–2	—

Source: Soccerway

== Matches ==
=== Key ===
Tournament

- 1. HNL = 2011–12 Prva HNL
- Cup = 2011–12 Croatian Cup
- UCL = 2011–12 UEFA Champions League
- UEL = 2011–12 UEFA Europa League

Ground

- H = Home
- A = Away
- HR = Home replacement
- AR = Away replacement

Round

- R1 = Round 1 (round of 32)
- R2 = Round 2 (round of 16)
- QF = Quarter-finals
- SF = Semi-finals
- F = Final
- QR2 = Second Qualifying Round
- QR3 = Third Qualifying Round
- Play-off = Play-off Round
- Group = Group Stage

Win	Draw	Loss

=== Pre-season ===
M	Date	Tournament	Round	Ground	Opponent	Score	Attendance	Dinamo scorers	Report
1	18 Jun	Friendly	—N/a	A	Šmarje (Slovenia)	4–2	600	Kovačić, Kramarić, Rukavina, Barbarić	Sportnet.hr
2	23 Jun	Friendly	—N/a	A	Slavija Pleternica (Croatia)	5–0		Krstanović (2), Alispahić, Bećiraj, Palić	Sportnet.hr
3	28 Jun	Friendly	—N/a	N (Slovenia)	Ružomberok (Slovakia)	2–0	50	Vrsaljko	Sportnet.hr
4	2 Jul	Friendly	—N/a	N (Slovenia)	Śląsk Wrocław (Poland)	1–2		Kovačić	Sportnet.hr
5	3 Jul	Friendly	—N/a	A	Limbuš (Slovenia)	3–0		Ademi, Kramarić	Sportnet.hr
6	5 Jul	Friendly	—N/a	N (Slovenia)	Baku (Azerbaijan)	2–0	1000	Krstanović, Ibáñez	Sportnet.hr

=== Season friendly ===
M	Date	Tournament	Round	Ground	Opponent	Score	Attendance	Dinamo scorers	Report
1	1 Sep	Friendly	—N/a	A	Croatia Đakovo	4–0	3.500	Krstanović (2), Sylvestr, Beqiraj	gnkdinamo.hr
2	3 Sep	Friendly	—N/a	A	Sloga Čakovec	6–1	1.500	Sylvestr (2), Špehar (2), Palić, Kramarić	gnkdinamo.hr
3	6 Oct	Friendly	—N/a	A	NK Opatija	3–1	600	Kramarić (2), Krstanović	gnkdinamo.hr
4	8 Oct	Friendly	—N/a	A	Marsonia 1909	3–1	1.200	Krstanović (2), Leko	gnkdinamo.hr

=== Mid-season friendly ===
M	Date	Tournament	Round	Ground	Opponent	Score	Attendance	Dinamo scorers	Report
1	16 Jan	Friendly	—N/a	A (Bosnia and Herzegovina)	NK Brotnjo (Bosnia and Herzegovina)	1–1	4.000	Krstanović	gnkdinamo.hr
2	19 Jan	Gabela Trophy	—N/a	A (Bosnia and Herzegovina)	GOŠK Gabela (Bosnia and Herzegovina)	2–0	300	Sylvestr, Alispahić	gnkdinamo.hr
3	20 Jan	Gabela Trophy	—N/a	N (Bosnia and Herzegovina)	RNK Split	0 – 0 (2-4p)	400		gnkdinamo.hr
4	29 Jan	Atlantic Cup	—N/a	N (Portugal)	Odense BK (Denmark)	3–1	100	Sylvestr (2), Tomečak	gnkdinamo.hr
5	1 Feb	Atlantic Cup	—N/a	N (Portugal)	Helsingborgs IF (Sweden)	1–0	100	Krstanović	gnkdinamo.hr
6	5 Feb	Atlantic Cup	—N/a	N (Portugal)	FC Midtjylland (Denmark)	1–1	100	Tonel	gnkdinamo.hr
7	7 Feb	Atlantic Cup (final)	—N/a	N (Portugal)	FC Midtjylland (Denmark)	0–1	100		gnkdinamo.hr

=== Competitive ===
M	Date	Tournament	Round	Ground	Opponent	Score	Attendance	Dinamo scorers	Report
1	12 Jul	UCL	QR2	H	Neftchi Baku (Azerbaijan)	3–0	32,000	Badelj, Krstanović (2)	Sportnet.hr
2	19 Jul	UCL	QR2	A	Neftchi Baku (Azerbaijan)	0–0	7,000		Sportnet.hr
3	23 Jul	1. HNL	1	H	Inter Zaprešić	2–0	2.000	Kovačić, Rukavina	gnkdinamo.hr
4	27 Jul	UCL	QR3	A	HJK Helsinki (Finland)	2–1	10.700	owngoal, Sammir	gnkdinamo.hr
5	30 Jul	1. HNL	2	H	Cibalia	2–0	1.300	Ibanez, Sammir	Sportnet.hr
6	3 Aug	UCL	QR3	H	HJK Helsinki (Finland)	1–0	35,000	Ibanez	Sportnet.hr
7	6 Aug	1. HNL	3	A	Slaven Belupo	2–0	3.500	Rukavina (2)	Sportnet.hr
8	12 Aug	1. HNL	4	H	Karlovac	5–0	1.600	Krstanović, Badelj, Tonel, Šitum, Beqiraj	gnkdinamo.hr
9	17 Aug	UCL	Play-off	H	Malmö FF (Sweden)	4–1	35.000	Sammir (2), Rukavina, Beqiraj	Sportnet.hr
10	20 Aug	1. HNL	5	A	Osijek	4–0	7.000	Tomečak, Šitum (2), Kovačić	gnkdinamo.hr
11	23 Aug	UCL	Play-off	A	Malmö FF (Sweden)	0–2	15.000		Sportnet.hr
12	27 Aug	1. HNL	6	H	Lučko	1–0	3.000	Šitum	gnkdinamo.hr
13	10 Sep	1. HNL	7	A	Hajduk Split	1–1	30.000	Ibanez	Sportnet.hr
14	14 Sep	UCL	Group	H	Real Madrid (Spain)	0–1	27.738		gnkdinamo.hr
15	17 Sep	1. HNL	8	H	Varaždin	7–0	6.500	Ibanez (2), Pokrivač, Kovačić, Beqiraj, Morales, Krstanović	gnkdinamo.hr
16	20 Sep	Cup	R1	A	NK Radoboj	5–0	2.000	Kramarić, Šitum, Morales, Šimunić (2)	gnkdinamo.hr
17	23 Sep	1. HNL	9	A	Lokomotiva	2–1	3.000	Beqiraj (2)	gnkdinamo.hr
18	27 Sep	UCL	Group	A	Lyon (France)	0–2	34.432		gnkdinamo.hr
19	1 Oct	1. HNL	10	H	Šibenik	2–1	3.200	Sammir, Beqiraj	gnkdinamo.hr
20	15 Oct	1. HNL	11	A	Zadar	1–2	5.300	Beqiraj	gnkdinamo.hr
21	18 Oct	UCL	Group	H	Ajax (Netherlands)	0–2	25.600		gnkdinamo.hr
22	22 Oct	1. HNL	12	H	Rijeka	2–0	2.416	Rukavina, Krstanović	gnkdinamo.hr
23	26 Oct	Cup	R2	A	HAŠK Zagreb	4–0	800	Ademi, Krstanović, Morales, Sylvestr	gnkdinamo.hr
24	29 Oct	1. HNL	13	A	Istra 1961	2–0	4.000	Beqiraj, Krstanović	gnkdinamo.hr
25	2 Nov	UCL	Group	A	Ajax (Netherlands)	0–4	50.000		gnkdinamo.hr
26	5 Nov	1. HNL	14	H	NK Zagreb	1–0	2.500	Beqiraj	gnkdinamo.hr
27	19 Nov	1. HNL	15	A	RNK Split	3–0	4.000	Beqiraj, Ibanez, Vida	gnkdinamo.hr
28	22 Nov	UCL	Group	A	Real Madrid (Spain)	2–6	63.000	Beqiraj, Tomečak	gnkdinamo.hr
29	25 Nov	1. HNL	16	A	Inter Zaprešić	0–0	2.000		gnkdinamo.hr
30	3 Dec	1. HNL	17	A	Cibalia	2–2	4.000	Kovačić, Ibanez	gnkdinamo.hr
31	7 Dec	UCL	Group	H	Lyon (France)	1–7	16.000	Kovačić	gnkdinamo.hr
32	18 Feb	Cup	QF	H (in Pula)	Istra 1961	1–1	3.500	Badelj	gnkdinamo.hr
33	25 Feb	1. HNL	19	A	Karlovac	3–0	3.500	Tonel, Beqiraj, Krstanović	gnkdinamo.hr
34	3 Mar	1. HNL	20	H	Osijek	1–0	3.000	Alispahić	gnkdinamo.hr
35	7 Mar	Cup	QF	A (in Zagreb)	Istra 1961	1 – 1(5-4p)	2.000	Alispahić	gnkdinamo.hr
36	10 Mar	1. HNL	21	A	Lučko	4–0	2.500	Leko (2), Beqiraj, Krstanović	gnkdinamo.hr
37	17 Mar	1. HNL	22	H	Hajduk Split	2–1	18.000	Krstanović (2)	Sportnet.hr
38	21 Mar	1. HNL	18	H	Slaven Belupo	2–0	1.361	Beqiraj (2)	gnkdinamo.hr
39	24 Mar	1. HNL	23	A	Varaždin	4–0	2.500	Ibanez, Tomečak, Alispahić, Krstanović	gnkdinamo.hr
40	31 Mar	1. HNL	24	H	Lokomotiva	6–0	1.500	Vida, Sammir, Rukavina, Tomečak, Badelj, Alispahić	gnkdinamo.hr
41	4 Apr	Cup	SF	H	NK Zagreb	1–1	2.514	Badelj	gnkdinamo.hr
42	7 Apr	1. HNL	25	A	HNK Šibenik	3–0	1.000	Sammir (2), Badelj	gnkdinamo.hr
43	14 Apr	1. HNL	26	H	NK Zadar	1–1	0	Krstanović	gnkdinamo.hr
44	17 Apr	Cup	SF	A	NK Zagreb	2–1	1500	Leko, Krstanović	gnkdinamo.hr
45	21 Apr	1. HNL	27	A	HNK Rijeka	1–1	5000	Pivarić	gnkdinamo.hr
46	28 Apr	1. HNL	28	H	Istra 1961	4–1	1376	Pivarić (2), Alispahić, Pokrivač	gnkdinamo.hr
47	2 May	Cup	F	A	Osijek	0–0	8000		gnkdinamo.hr
48	5 May	1. HNL	29	A	NK Zagreb	3–0	2500	Beqiraj (2), Calello	gnkdinamo.hr
49	9 May	Cup	F	H	Osijek	3–1	12000	Kovačić, Beqiraj, Ibanez	gnkdinamo.hr
50	12 May	1. HNL	30	H	RNK Split	0–0	5000		gnkdinamo.hr

Last updated 8 April 2012
Sources: Prva-HNL.hr, Sportske novosti, Sportnet.hr, gnkdinamo.hr

== Statistics ==
=== Statistics ===
Competitive matches only. Updated to games played 12 May 2012.

Rank	Name	League	Cup	Europe	Total
1	(Montenegro) Fatos Beqiraj	15	1	2	18
2	(Croatia) Ivan Krstanović	10	1	2	13
3	(Argentina) Luis Ibanez	7	1	1	9
4	(Brazil) Sammir	5	–	3	8
5	(Croatia) Ante Rukavina	5	–	1	6
5	(Croatia) Milan Badelj	3	2	1	6
5	(Croatia) Mateo Kovačić	4	1	1	6
5	(Bosnia and Herzegovina) Mehmed Alispahić	4	2	–	6
6	(Croatia) Mario Šitum	4	1	–	5
7	(Croatia) Ivan Tomečak	3	–	1	4
8	(Chile) Pedro Morales	1	2	–	3
8	(Croatia) Josip Pivarić	3	–	–	3
9	(Croatia) Josip Šimunić	–	2	–	2
9	(Portugal) Tonel	2	–	–	2
9	(Croatia) Jerko Leko	2	–	–	2
9	(Croatia) Domagoj Vida	2	–	–	2
9	(Croatia) Nikola Pokrivač	2	–	–	2
10	(Croatia) Andrej Kramarić	–	1	–	1
10	(Croatia) Arijan Ademi	–	1	–	1
10	(Slovakia) Jakub Sylvestr	–	1	–	1
10	(Croatia) Šime Vrsaljko	–	1	–	1
10	(Argentina) Adrian Calello	1	–	–	1

Source: Competitive matches

== Transfers ==
=== In ===
Date	Position	Player	From	Fee
22 May 2011	MF	(Bosnia and Herzegovina) Mehmed Alispahić	Šibenik	Free
25 May 2011	MF	(Croatia) Jerko Leko	Bucaspor (Turkey)	Free
6 June 2011	FW	(Croatia) Ivan Krstanović	NK Zagreb	Undisclosed
17 June 2011	DF	(Croatia) Domagoj Vida	Bayer Leverkusen (Germany)	Undisclosed
14 July 2011	DF	(Croatia) Dino Škvorc	Varaždin	Free
14 July 2011	FW	(Croatia) Filip Škvorc	Varaždin	Free
14 July 2011	DF	(Sweden) Walid Atta	Lokomotiva	Free
16 August 2011	MF	(Croatia) Nikola Pokrivač	Red Bull Salzburg (Austria)	Free
25 August 2011	FW	(Croatia) Dino Špehar	NK Osijek	Undisclosed
31 August 2011	DF	(Croatia) Ante Puljić	NK Lokomotiva	On Loan
31 August 2011	DF	(Croatia) Josip Šimunić	TSG 1899 Hoffenheim (Germany)	Undisclosed

=== Out ===
Date	Position	Player	To	Fee
22 May 2011	MF	(Albania) Emiljano Vila	Skënderbeu Korçë (Albania)	Free
15 June 2011	GK	(Croatia) Marin Skender	Released	Free
15 June 2011	MF	(Croatia) Josip Brezovec	Slaven Belupo	Free
16 June 2011	FW	(Czech Republic) Miroslav Slepička	Sparta Prague (Czech Republic)	Free
7 December 2011	Df	(Argentina) Leandro Cufre	Club Atlas (Mexico)	Free
9 January 2012	DF	(Croatia) Ante Puljić	NK Lokomotiva	Free
9 January 2012	DF	(Croatia) Dino Škvorc	Released	Free
9 January 2012	DF	(Croatia) Tomislav Barbarić	Released	Free
9 January 2012	MF	(Croatia) Antun Palić	Released	Free
9 January 2012	MF	(Cameroon) Mathias Chago	Released	Free
27 January 2012	MF	(Sweden) Walid Atta	Released	Free
