= 2010–11 GNK Dinamo Zagreb season =

Dinamo Zagreb
2010–11 season
- Chairman: Mirko Barišić
- Manager: Velimir Zajec (until 9 August 2010); Vahid Halilhodžić (from 17 August 2010 until 6 May 2011); Marijo Tot (from 7 May 2011 until 26 May 2011)
- Stadium: Maksimir Stadium
- Prva HNL: 1st (13th title)
- Croatian Cup: Winners (11th title)
- UEFA Champions League: Third qualifying round (eliminated by Sheriff Tiraspol)
- UEFA Europa League: Group stage
- Top goalscorer: League: Sammir (10); All: Sammir (19)
- Highest home attendance: 25,000 (vs PAOK, 15 December 2010)
- Lowest home attendance: 350 (vs Hrvatski Dragovoljac, 24 July 2010)
Home colours	Away colours

GNK Dinamo Zagreb (also known as Dinamo Zagreb, Dinamo and The Blues) are an association football club from Zagreb, Croatia. Home matches were played at the club's ground, Maksimir Stadium. Dinamo's season officially began 1 June 2010 and concluded on 30 May 2011, although competitive matches were played between 13 July and 25 May. During the season they competed in the Prva HNL, the highest division in Croatian football, and the Croatian Cup. They also played a total of twelve European games, first in the preliminary stages of the 2010–11 UEFA Champions League and later in the 2010–11 UEFA Europa League.

After guiding the club to their 12th Croatian league title in 2009–10, Krunoslav Jurčić resigned as manager of Dinamo in May 2010. He was replaced as manager by ex-Dinamo player and coach Velimir Zajec. However, after spending less than three months at the helm and after getting knocked out in the UEFA Champions League third qualifying round by Moldovan side Sheriff Tiraspol, Zajec was replaced in mid August by Bosnian manager Vahid Halilhodžić, whose previous post was managing the Ivory Coast national team.

Early in the season, first-team players including Ivan Turina, Ivica Vrdoljak and Croatia international striker Mario Mandžukić left the club while veteran defender Robert Kovač retired. New arrivals included striker Ante Rukavina, former Portugal international defender Tonel, Montenegro international forward Fatos Bećiraj and midfielder Arijan Ademi.

After a surprising league defeat to Rijeka on 31 July and the unsuccessful attempt to reach the UEFA Champions League group stage, the club's fortunes stabilised under Halilhodžić and Dinamo found themselves top of the league table by early October, a position they kept throughout the season. In spite of Dinamo's domestic dominance Halilhodžić gradually became target of increased criticism by sections of the media for what they saw as an inefficient style of football practised by the club, which culminated in a much publicized conflict with club president Zdravko Mamić in the half-time of the league game against minnows Inter Zaprešić in early May 2011. Halilhodžić's contract was then de facto terminated, so in the last four games of the season Dinamo was led by caretaker manager Marijo Tot. In other competitions Dinamo won the 2010–11 Croatian Cup, their 11th title, and appeared in the Europa League group stage for the fourth consecutive season, picking up seven points in six matches and finishing third in their group behind Villarreal and PAOK.

== Pre-season ==
Legend

Win (W) Draw (D) Loss (L) Postponed (P–P)

16 June 2010	Dinamo Zagreb	1 – 0	Koper	Hitrec-Kacijan, Zagreb
	Chago 25'			Attendance: 4,000; Referee: Dalibor Mlakar (Zagreb)

24 June 2010	Dinamo Zagreb	0 – 0	Shandong Luneng	Stadion Slobode, Varaždin
				Attendance: 2,000; Referee: Kovačić (Križevci)

26 June 2010	Dinamo Zagreb	2 – 1	Metalurh Zaporizhya	Langenfeld, Austria
	Sivonjić 55'; Chago 58'		Nevmyvaka 65'

27 June 2010	Dinamo Zagreb	1 – 2	Viktoria Plzeň	Austria
	Sivonjić 77'		Bakoš 34'; Horváth 83' (pen.)

1 July 2010	Dinamo Zagreb	1 – 1	Olympiacos	Illerstadion, Kempten
	Sammir 15' (pen.)		Zairi 85'	Attendance: 500

4 July 2010	Dinamo Zagreb	2 – 1	Lech Poznań	Austria
	Ibáñez 27'; Kramarić 55'		Bosacki 65' (pen.)

7 July 2010	Mladost Petrinja	0 – 3	Dinamo Zagreb	Gradski stadion, Petrinja
			Slepička 10'; Etto 60'; Kramarić 75'	Attendance: 2,500; Referee: Vlado Svilokos (Sisak)

== Super Cup ==
As champions of the 2009–10 Prva HNL Dinamo qualified for the 2010 Croatian Super Cup, a one-off match played between league champions and Croatian Cup winners which serves as a curtain raiser for the following football season. This was the ninth Supercup played since the formation of the Croatian football league in 1992 and the first since 2006, as it is never held when a club wins "The Double" (Dinamo had won three consecutive Doubles in 2006–07, 2007–08 and 2008–09).

The match was decided in an Eternal Derby, as Dinamo played 2009–10 Croatian Cup winners and their greatest rivals Hajduk Split at Maksimir. It was their second competitive match led by the newly appointed manager Velimir Zajec and Dinamo won the game 1–0 through a second-half header by Igor Bišćan after Dodô delivered a corner kick. It was Dinamo's fourth Super Cup win and it later proved to be Zajec's only silverware won with Dinamo as he was sacked on 9 August.

17 July 2010	Dinamo Zagreb	1 – 0	Hajduk Split	Maksimir Stadium, Zagreb
	Bišćan 77'			Attendance: 8,000; Referee: Draženko Kovačić (Križevci)

== Squad ==
As of 13 July and the first competitive match of the season against FC Koper.

Note: Flags indicate national team as defined under FIFA eligibility rules; some limited exceptions apply. Players may hold more than one non-FIFA nationality.

No.	Pos.	Nation	Player
1	GK	CRO	Tomislav Butina
3	DF	ARG	Luis Ibáñez
4	DF	CRO	Leonard Mesarić
5	MF	ARG	Adrián Calello
7	MF	BRA	Etto
8	MF	CRO	Ante Tomić
10	MF	BRA	Sammir
12	GK	CRO	Filip Lončarić
13	DF	CRO	Dario Šimić

No.	Pos.	Nation	Player
15	MF	CMR	Mathias Chago
16	MF	CRO	Milan Badelj
17	FW	CRO	Mario Mandžukić
19	DF	CRO	Tomislav Barbarić
20	FW	CZE	Miroslav Slepička
22	DF	CRO	Igor Bišćan (captain)
23	FW	BRA	Dodô
24	FW	CRO	Ilija Sivonjić
77	MF	CHI	Pedro Morales
99	FW	CRO	Ante Rukavina

== Competitions ==
=== Overall ===
Competition	Started round	Final result	First match	Last Match
2010 Croatian Supercup	—N/a	Winners	17 July	
2010–11 Prva HNL	—N/a	1st	24 July	21 May
2010–11 Croatian Cup	First round	Winners	22 September	25 May
2010–11 UEFA Champions League	QR2	QR3	13 July	4 August
2010–11 UEFA Europa League	Play-off round	Group stage	19 August	15 December

=== Prva HNL ===
==== Classification ====
Pos	Team	Pld	W	D	L	GF	GA	GD	Pts	Qualification or relegation
1	Dinamo Zagreb (C)	30	22	6	2	52	12	+40	72	Qualification to Champions League second qualifying round
2	Hajduk Split	30	16	7	7	54	32	+22	55	Qualification to Europa League third qualifying round
3	RNK Split	30	16	5	9	38	22	+16	53	Qualification to Europa League second qualifying round
4	Cibalia	30	12	8	10	33	24	+9	44	
5	Inter Zaprešić	30	12	6	12	31	35	−4	42	

Source: Prva-HNL.hr
Rules for classification: 1) points; 2) goal difference; 3) number of goals scored.
For deciding champions, qualification to UEFA Europa League and relegation: 1st points; 2nd head-to-head points; 3rd head-to-head goal difference; 4th head-to-head away goals scored
(C) Champions

==== Results summary ====
Overall								Home						Away					
Pld	W	D	L	GF	GA	GD	Pts	W	D	L	GF	GA	GD	W	D	L	GF	GA	GD
30	22	6	2	52	12	+40	72	11	3	1	25	7	+18	11	3	1	27	5	+22

Last updated: 21 May 2011.
Source: Sportnet.hr

==== Results by round ====
Round	1	2	3	4	5	6	7	8	9	10	11	12	13	14	15	16	17	18	19	20	21	22	23	24	25	26	27	28	29	30
Ground	H	H	A	H	A	H	A	H	A	H	A	H	A	H	A	A	A	H	A	H	A	H	A	H	A	H	A	H	A	H
Result	W	L	D	W	W	W	D	W	W	W	W	W	W	W	W	W	W	D	W	D	W	W	W	W	L	W	W	W	D	D
Position	2	7	8	6	4	3	3	2	2	1	1	1	1	1	1	1	1	1	1	1	1	1	1	1	1	1	1	1	1	1

Updated to match(es) played on 21 May 2011. Source: Competitive matches
A = Away; H = Home; W = Win; D = Draw; L = Loss

==== Results by opponent ====
Team	Results		Points
Team	Home	Away	Points
Cibalia	2–0	1–0	6
Hajduk Split	2–0	1–1	4
Hrvatski Dragovoljac	4–1	6–0	6
Inter Zaprešić	1–0	3–0	6
Istra 1961	4–0	1–2	3
Karlovac	4–2	1–0	6
Lokomotiva	1–0	2–0	6
Osijek	1–0	3–1	6
Rijeka	1–2	2–0	3
Šibenik	1–0	2–0	6
Slaven Belupo	0–0	2–0	4
RNK Split	1–1	1–0	4
Varaždin	1–1	1–1	2
Zadar	1–0	0–0	4
NK Zagreb	1–0	1–0	6

Source: 2010–11 Prva HNL article

=== 2010–11 UEFA Europa League ===
==== Group D ====
Pos	Team	Pld	W	D	L	GF	GA	GD	Pts	Qualification	VLR	PAOK	DZ	BRG
1	(Spain) Villarreal	6	4	0	2	8	5	+3	12	Advance to knockout phase	—	1–0	3–0	2–1
2	(Greece) PAOK	6	3	2	1	5	3	+2	11	Advance to knockout phase	1–0	—	1–0	1–1
3	(Croatia) Dinamo Zagreb	6	2	1	3	4	5	−1	7		2–0	0–1	—	0–0
4	(Belgium) Club Brugge	6	0	3	3	4	8	−4	3		1–2	1–1	0–2	—

Source: Soccerway

== Matches ==
=== Key ===
Tournament

- 1. HNL = 2010–11 Prva HNL
- Supercup = Croatian Supercup
- Cup = 2010–11 Croatian Cup
- UCL = 2010–11 UEFA Champions League
- UEL = 2010–11 UEFA Europa League

Ground

- H = Home
- A = Away
- HR = Home replacement
- AR = Away replacement

Round

- R1 = Round 1 (round of 32)
- R2 = Round 2 (round of 16)
- QF = Quarter-finals
- SF = Semi-finals
- F = Final
- QR2 = Second Qualifying Round
- QR3 = Third Qualifying Round
- Play-off = Play-off Round
- Group = Group Stage

Win	Draw	Loss

=== Competitive ===
M	Date	Tournament	Round	Ground	Opponent	Score	Attendance	Dinamo Scorers	Report
1	13 Jul	UCL	QR2	H	Koper (Slovenia)	5 – 1	7,000	Mandžukić (2), Slepička, Sammir, Etto	Sportnet.hr
2	17 Jul	Supercup	N/A	H	Hajduk Split	1 – 0	8,000	Bišćan	Sportnet.hr
3	20 Jul	UCL	QR2	AR (Slovenia)	Koper (Slovenia)	0 – 3	2,000		Sportnet.hr
4	24 Jul	1. HNL	1	H	Hrvatski Dragovoljac	4 – 1	350	Morales, Sammir, Slepička, Mesarić	Sportnet.hr
5	27 Jul	UCL	QR3	A (Moldova)	Sheriff Tiraspol (Moldova)	1 – 1	10,000	Sammir	Sportnet.hr
6	31 Jul	1. HNL	2	H	Rijeka	1 – 2	3,500	Sammir	Sportnet.hr
7	4 Aug	UCL	QR3	H	Sheriff Tiraspol (Moldova)	1 – 1	10,000	Sammir	Sportnet.hr
8	7 Aug	1. HNL	3	A	Varaždin	1 – 1	3,000	Rukavina	Sportnet.hr
9	14 Aug	1. HNL	4	H	Karlovac	4 – 2	400	Sammir (2), Kramarić, Rukavina	Sportnet.hr
10	19 Aug	UEL	Play-off	A (Hungary)	Győri ETO (Hungary)	2 – 0	8,000	Rukavina (2)	Sportnet.hr
11	22 Aug	1. HNL	5	A	Slaven Belupo	2 – 0	4,000	Rukavina, Sammir	Sportnet.hr
12	26 Aug	UEL	Play-off	H	Győri ETO (Hungary)	2 – 1	8,000	Sammir (2)	Sportnet.hr
13	28 Aug	1. HNL	6	H	Cibalia	2 – 0	3,500	Vrsaljko, Tomečak	Sportnet.hr
14	11 Sep	1. HNL	7	A	Hajduk Split	1 – 1	30,000	Sammir	Sportnet.hr
15	16 Sep	UEL	Group	H	Villarreal (Spain)	2 – 0	21,000	Rukavina, Sammir	Sportnet.hr
16	19 Sep	1. HNL	8	H	NK Zagreb	1 – 0	11,000	Barbarić	Sportnet.hr
17	22 Sep	Cup	R1	A	Zadrugar	6 – 0	1,500	Bećiraj (2), Kramarić (3), Sylvestr	Sportnet.hr
18	26 Sep	1. HNL	9	AR	Lokomotiva	2 – 0	50	Chago, Tonel	Sportnet.hr
19	30 Sep	UEL	Group	A (Greece)	PAOK (Greece)	0 – 1	25,000		Sportnet.hr
20	3 Oct	1. HNL	10	H	Istra 1961	4 – 0	1,500	Sylvestr, Bećiraj, Sammir (2)	Sportnet.hr
21	16 Oct	1. HNL	11	A	Osijek	3 – 1	5,000	Sammir, Badelj, Bećiraj	Sportnet.hr
22	21 Oct	UEL	Group	H	Club Brugge (Belgium)	0 – 0	22,000		Sportnet.hr
23	23 Oct	1. HNL	12	H	Šibenik	1 – 0	3,000	Tomečak	Sportnet.hr
24	27 Oct	Cup	R2	A	Karlovac	2 – 0	1,500	Bećiraj, Cufré	Sportnet.hr
25	30 Oct	1. HNL	13	A	Inter Zaprešić	3 – 0	3,000	Tonel, Sammir, Ibáñez	Sportnet.hr
26	4 Nov	UEL	Group	A (Belgium)	Club Brugge (Belgium)	2 – 0	15,000	Sammir, Bišćan	Sportnet.hr
27	7 Nov	1. HNL	14	H	Zadar	1 – 0	4,000	Tomečak	Sportnet.hr
28	13 Nov	1. HNL	15	A	RNK Split	1 – 0	4,000	Calello	Sportnet.hr
29	20 Nov	1. HNL	16	A	Hrvatski Dragovoljac	6 – 0	1,000	Tomečak, Chago, Ibáñez, Kovačić, Badelj, Bećiraj	Sportnet.hr
30	23 Nov	Cup	QF	H	Osijek	2 – 0	1,000	Tonel, Kramarić	Sportnet.hr
31	27 Nov	1. HNL	17	A	Rijeka	2 – 0	2,500	Bećiraj, Badelj	Sportnet.hr
32	2 Dec	UEL	Group	A (Spain)	Villarreal (Spain)	0 – 3			Sportnet.hr
33	5 Dec	1. HNL	18	H	Varaždin	1 – 1	1,000	Morales	Sportnet.hr
34	9 Dec	Cup	QF	A	Osijek	3 – 1	300	Bećiraj (2), Bišćan	Sportnet.hr
35	15 Dec	UEL	Group	H	PAOK (Greece)	0 – 1	25,000		Sportnet.hr
36	26 Feb	1. HNL	19	A	Karlovac	1 – 0	1,000	Šitum	Sportnet.hr
37	5 Mar	1. HNL	20	H	Slaven Belupo	0 – 0	500		Sportnet.hr
38	12 Mar	1. HNL	21	A	Cibalia	1 – 0	6,000	Bećiraj	Sportnet.hr
39	19 Mar	1. HNL	22	H	Hajduk Split	2 – 0	15,000	Badelj, Bećiraj	Sportnet.hr
40	2 Apr	1. HNL	23	A	NK Zagreb	1 – 0	3,000	Calello	Sportnet.hr
41	6 Apr	Cup	SF	H	Slaven Belupo	4 – 1	1,000	Sammir, Sylvestr, Badelj, Tomečak	Sportnet.hr
42	9 Apr	1. HNL	24	H	Lokomotiva	1 – 0	1,693	Sylvestr	Sportnet.hr
43	16 Apr	1. HNL	25	A	Istra 1961	1 – 2	2,500	Bećiraj	Sportnet.hr
44	20 Apr	Cup	SF	A	Slaven Belupo	1 – 0	3,000	Tomečak	Sportnet.hr
45	23 Apr	1. HNL	26	H	Osijek	1 – 0	1,850	Badelj	Sportnet.hr
46	30 Apr	1. HNL	27	A	Šibenik	2 – 0	2,000	Morales, Rukavina	Sportnet.hr
47	6 May	1. HNL	28	H	Inter Zaprešić	1 – 0	600	Bećiraj	Sportnet.hr
48	11 May	Cup	Final	H	Varaždin	5 – 1	5,000	Sammir, Tonel, Bećiraj (2), Badelj	Sportnet.hr
49	14 May	1. HNL	29	A	Zadar	0 – 0	2,500		Sportnet.hr
50	21 May	1. HNL	30	H	RNK Split	1 – 1	3,000	Badelj	Sportnet.hr
51	25 May	Cup	Final	A	Varaždin	3 – 1	3,500	Ibáñez, Badelj, Bećiraj	Sportnet.hr

Last updated 25 May 2011
Sources: Prva-HNL.hr, Sportske novosti, Sportnet.hr

== Players ==
=== Statistics ===
Competitive matches only. Updated to games played 25 May 2011.

Key

Player left the club during season
Player joined the club during season

Rank	Name	League	Cup	Europe	Supercup	Total
1	(Brazil) Sammir	10	2	7	–	19
2	(Montenegro) Fatos Bećiraj ^{B}	8	8	–	–	16
3	(Croatia) Milan Badelj	6	3	–	–	9
4	(Croatia) Ante Rukavina	4	–	3	–	7
5	(Croatia) Ivan Tomečak	4	2	–	–	6
6	(Croatia) Andrej Kramarić	1	4	–	–	5
7	(Slovakia) Jakub Sylvestr ^{C}	2	2	–	–	4
7	(Portugal) Tonel ^{D}	2	2	–	–	4
9	(Croatia) Igor Bišćan	–	1	1	1	3
9	(Argentina) Luis Ibáñez	2	1	–	–	3
9	(Chile) Pedro Morales	3	–	–	–	3
12	(Argentina) Adrián Calello	2	–	–	–	2
12	(Cameroon) Mathias Chago	2	–	–	–	2
12	(Croatia) Mario Mandžukić ^{A}	–	–	2	–	2
12	(Czech Republic) Miroslav Slepička ^{E}	1	–	1	–	2
16	(Croatia) Tomislav Barbarić	1	–	–	–	1
16	(Argentina) Leandro Cufré	–	1	–	–	1
16	(Brazil) Etto ^{F}	–	–	1	–	1
16	(Croatia) Mateo Kovačić	1	–	–	–	1
16	(Croatia) Leonard Mesarić	1	–	–	–	1
16	(Croatia) Mario Šitum	1	–	–	–	1
16	(Croatia) Šime Vrsaljko	1	–	–	–	1

Source: Competitive matches
Notes:
A: Mandžukić was transferred out to VfL Wolfsburg on 14 July 2010.
B: Bećiraj joined Dinamo in August 2010 from FK Budućnost Podgorica
C: Sylvestr joined Dinamo in August 2010 from ŠK Slovan Bratislava
D: Tonel joined Dinamo in August 2010 from Sporting CP
E: Slepička went on a six-months loan to SpVgg Greuther Fürth in January 2011
F: Etto left Dinamo to join PAOK in January 2011

=== Transfers ===
==== In ====
Unless a country is specified, all clubs play in the Croatian football league system.

Date	Player	From	Fee
25 May 2010	Leonard Mesarić	Lokomotiva	Free
16 June 2010	Arijan Ademi	Šibenik	€120,000
18 July 2010	Almir Bekić	Sloboda (Bosnia and Herzegovina)	€100,000
31 July 2010	Ante Rukavina	Panathinaikos (Greece)	€700,000
1 September 2010	Fatos Bećiraj	Budućnost (Montenegro)	€650,000
1 September 2010	Jakub Sylvestr	Slovan Bratislava (Slovakia)	€1,500,000
1 September 2010	Tonel	Sporting CP (Portugal)	Undisclosed

==== Out ====
Date	Player	From	Fee
15 May 2010	Guillermo Suárez	Released	
28 May 2010	Ivan Turina	AIK (Sweden)	Undisclosed
28 May 2010	Ivica Vrdoljak	Legia Warsaw (Poland)	€1,500,000
16 July 2010	Mario Mandžukić	VfL Wolfsburg (Germany)	€7,000,000
18 August 2010	Ante Tomić	Released	
20 September 2010	Karlo Primorac	Released	
