= List of Croatian football transfers winter 2008–09 =

This is a list of Croatian football transfers for the 2008–09 winter transfer window. Only moves featuring at least one Prva HNL club are listed. The winter transfer window officially opened on 1 January 2009, although transfers may have taken place prior to that date. The window closed at midnight on 31 January 2009.

== Transfers ==
Date	Name	Moving from	Moving to	Fee	Source
08 Dec 2008	(Croatia) Marin Tomasov	(Croatia) Zadar	(Croatia) Hajduk Split	€400,000	Sportnet.hr
12 Dec 2008	(Croatia) Gordan Golik	(Croatia) Varteks	(Poland) Lech Poznań	€250,000	Sportnet.hr
12 Dec 2008	(Croatia) Mario Brkljača	(Croatia) NK Zagreb	(Croatia) Hajduk Split	€300,000	Sportnet.hr
15 Dec 2008	(Argentina) Adrián Calello	(Argentina) Independiente	(Croatia) Dinamo Zagreb	€2,200,000	Sportnet.hr
18 Dec 2008	(Bosnia and Herzegovina) Alen Škoro	(Croatia) Rijeka	(Poland) Jagiellonia Białystok	Free transfer	
18 Dec 2008	(Czech Republic) Miroslav Slepička	(Czech Republic) Sparta Prague	(Croatia) Dinamo Zagreb	€1,500,000	Sportnet.hr
18 Dec 2008	(Croatia) Ilija Sivonjić	(Croatia) Inter Zaprešić	(Croatia) Dinamo Zagreb	€450,000	Sportnet.hr
23 Dec 2008	(Croatia) Mihael Mikić	(Croatia) Dinamo Zagreb	(Japan) Sanfrecce Hiroshima	€800,000	Sportnet.hr
23 Dec 2008	(Croatia) Ivan Ibriks	(Croatia) Suhopolje	(Croatia) Osijek	Undisclosed	Sportnet.hr
08 Jan 2009	(Croatia) Ante Kulušić	(Croatia) Šibenik	(Turkey) Gençlerbirliği	€400,000	Sportnet.hr
12 Jan 2009	(Croatia) Hrvoje Vejić	(Russia) Tom Tomsk	(Croatia) Hajduk Split	Free transfer	Sportnet.hr
13 Jan 2009	(Croatia) Nino Bule	(Croatia) Inter Zaprešić	(Greece) Panserraikos	Free transfer	Nogometni magazin
15 Jan 2009	(Croatia) Mario Čutura	(Croatia) NK Zagreb	Croatia Sesvete	Free transfer	Sportnet.hr
16 Jan 2009	(Croatia) Davor Kukec	(Croatia) Inter Zaprešić	(Greece) Panionios	€300,000	Sportnet.hr
27 Jan 2009	(Croatia) Dino Drpić	(Croatia) Dinamo Zagreb	(Germany) Karlsruher SC	Loan	Sportnet.hr
29 Jan 2009	(Croatia) Robert Kovač	(Germany) Borussia Dortmund	(Croatia) Dinamo Zagreb	€500,000	Sportnet.hr
30 Jan 2009	(Croatia) Anthony Šerić	(Turkey) Beşiktaş	(Croatia) Hajduk Split	Free transfer	Sportnet.hr
03 Feb 2009	(Croatia) Kristijan Brčić	(Croatia) Inter Zaprešić	(Portugal) Nacional	Loan	
