= Ante Tomić (footballer) =

Croatian former professional footballer (born 1983)

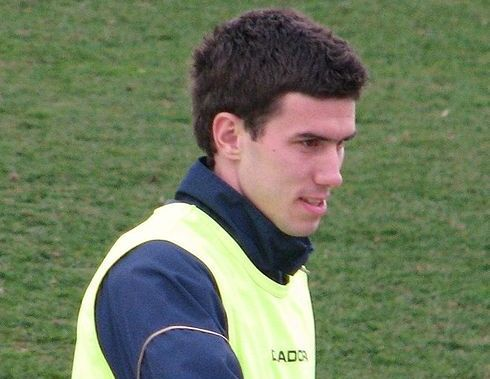

Personal information
- Full name: Ante Tomić
- Date of birth: 23 May 1983 (age 43)
- Place of birth: Zagreb, SR Croatia, SFR Yugoslavia
- Height: 1.86 m (6 ft 1 in)
- Position: Midfielder

Team information
- Current team: Croatia U21 (assistant)

Youth career
- 1993–2000: Dinamo Zagreb

Senior career*
Years	Team	Apps	(Gls)
2000–2010	Dinamo Zagreb	74	(5)
2000–2001	→ Croatia Sesvete (loan)	0	(0)
2002–2003	→ Inter Zaprešić (loan)	0	(0)
2007–2008	→ Skoda Xanthi (loan)	22	(0)
2010–2011	Koper	11	(1)
2011	Sanfrecce Hiroshima	9	(1)
2012–2013	Ehime	43	(2)
2015	Koper	18	(0)

International career^{‡}
1999–2000	Croatia U16	8	(0)
1999	Croatia U17	3	(0)
2001	Croatia U18	2	(0)
2001	Croatia U19	5	(0)
2002	Croatia U20	2	(0)
2003–2005	Croatia U21	9	(0)

Managerial career
- 2019–: Croatia U21 (assistant)
- * Club domestic league appearances and goals as of 4 November 2015 ‡ National team caps and goals as of 8 August 2010

Ante Tomić (Croatian pronunciation: [ǎːnte tômitɕ, - tǒː-]; born 23 May 1983) is a Croatian former professional footballer who played as a midfielder. He is currently working as an assistant manager of the Croatia national under-21 team.

He joined Dinamo Zagreb in 1993 and had spent most of his career in the club, with the exception of one-season loans at Croatia Sesvete, Inter Zaprešić and Skoda Xanthi. He made a total of 74 league appearances for the club and scored five goals. With Dinamo, he won four Prva HNL titles, three Croatian Cups and one Croatian Super Cup.

He also made appearances for the youth selections of the Croatia national football team. Tomić was capped 29 times, most of which he made as a Croatia under-21 member.

== Club career ==
Ante Tomić joined Dinamo Zagreb in 1993 and had been a member of the club until the summer of 2010. He made his debut in Dinamo Zagreb's first team in September 2001, aged 18. He made a total of 7 league appearances for the 2001–02 season and scored a goal. His most successful season with Dinamo Zagreb was 2006–07 Prva HNL when he made 16 league appearances in their title winning campaign. He had brief loan spells with Croatian clubs Croatia Sesvete and Inter Zaprešić. He also went on loan to Greek club Skoda Xanthi where he made 22 league appearances. He spent 2011 at Japanese club Sanfrecce Hiroshima, though he was released from his contract at the end of the season.

== International career ==
Tomić made his first official cap for the Croatia under-16 in a friendly match against the Czech Republic. He made a total of eight appearances for the under-16 team. He also participated in three qualifying matches for the under-17 team. Tomić made most of his appearances for the under-21 team where he was capped nine times.

== Club statistics ==
As of 4 November 2015.

Club	Season	League	
Club	Season	Apps	Goals
Croatia Sesvete	2000–01	0	0
Dinamo Zagreb	2001–02	7	1
Inter Zaprešić	2002–03	0	0
Dinamo Zagreb	2003–04	11	1
Dinamo Zagreb	2004–05	18	1
Dinamo Zagreb	2005–06	12	1
Dinamo Zagreb	2006–07	16	0
Dinamo Zagreb	2007–08	2	0
Skoda Xanthi	2007–08	22	0
Dinamo Zagreb	2008–09	8	1
Dinamo Zagreb	2009–10	0	0
Dinamo Zagreb	2010–11	0	0
Koper	2010–11	11	1
Sanfrecce Hiroshima	2011	9	1
Ehime FC	2012	25	1
Ehime FC	2013	18	1
Koper	2014–15	4	0
Koper	2015–16	14	0
Total		177	9

== Honours ==
As of 1 August 2015.

=== Dinamo Zagreb ===
- Prva HNL: 4

2006, 2007, 2008, 2009

- Croatian Cup: 3

2004, 2007, 2009

- Croatian Supercup: 1

2006

=== Koper ===
- Slovenian Football Cup: 1

2015

- Slovenian Supercup: 1

2015
