= Tomislav Butina =

Croatian footballer

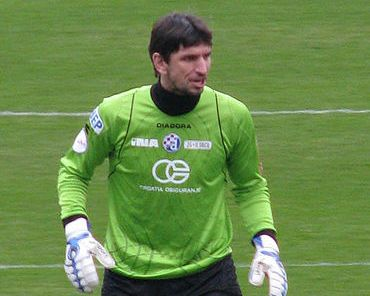

Personal information
- Date of birth: 30 March 1974 (age 52)
- Place of birth: Zagreb, SR Croatia, Yugoslavia
- Height: 1.91 m (6 ft 3 in)
- Position: Goalkeeper

Senior career*
Years	Team	Apps	(Gls)
1992–2003	Dinamo Zagreb	103	(0)
1994–1995	→ Karlovac (loan)		
1995–1996	→ Samobor (loan)		
1996–1997	→ Slaven Belupo (loan)		
2003–2006	Club Brugge	61	(0)
2006–2008	Olympiacos	4	(0)
2008–2010	Dinamo Zagreb	49	(0)
Total		216	(0)

International career
1995	Croatia U20	1	(0)
1994–1995	Croatia U21	11	(0)
2001–2006	Croatia	28	(0)
- * Club domestic league appearances and goals

Tomislav Butina (pronounced [tǒmislaʋ bǔtina]; born 30 March 1974) is a Croatian former professional footballer who played as goalkeeper for Dinamo Zagreb, Club Brugge and Olympiacos. He was also capped 28 times for the Croatia national team in the period from 2001 to 2006, and was member of Croatian squads at the 2002 and 2006 FIFA World Cups, as well as UEFA Euro 2004.

Butina began his professional career with Dinamo Zagreb, debuting for the first team on 23 May 1993, when the club was known as "Croatia Zagreb". However, he struggled to make an impact at the club at the time when Dražen Ladić was the club's longtime first-choice goalkeeper. In the mid-1990s, he had several loan spells with lower-tier Croatian sides Karlovac, Samobor and Slaven Belupo. In the late 1990s, he became a regular member of the squad, and, following Ladić's retirement in 2000, took over as Dinamo's first choice goalkeeper in the 2000–01 season.

In July 2003, Butina joined Belgian First Division club Club Brugge, where he spent three seasons before moving on to Greek powerhouse Olympiacos in 2006. Following an unsuccessful two-season spell with the club, he returned to Dinamo Zagreb for the 2008–09 season. He made 49 league appearances in his final spell with the club, before being released early in the 2010–11 season, on 18 August 2010.

Internationally, Butina represented Croatia at the under-20 and under-21 levels in 1994 and 1995, making a total of twelve appearances at youth levels. On 5 September 2001, he made his full international debut in a 2002 World Cup qualifier against San Marino. He went on to appear in all of Croatia's three matches at the Euro 2004 finals, and kept his place as the national team's first-choice goalkeeper over the following 18 months. He was also part of Croatia's 23-man squads for the 2002 and 2006 World Cup finals, but did not feature in any of the team's six matches during the two tournaments. In August 2006, he announced his retirement from the national team.

== Club career ==
=== Dinamo Zagreb ===
Butina became a member of Dinamo Zagreb senior squad in the inaugural season of the Prva HNL. He marked his debut for the club on 23 May 1993. Due to Dražen Ladić being an irreplaceable as the club's first-choice goalkeeper, Butina was sent on loans to smaller Prva HNL clubs. He then had season-long loan spells with Karlovac, Samobor and Slaven Belupo. He returned to Dinamo in 1997, made six league appearances in both the 1997–98 and the 1999–2000 title-winning campaigns and became the club's first-choice goalkeeper after Ladić's retirement in 2000. The next three seasons, he featured regularly in the Dinamo Zagreb first team, making a total of 90 league appearances and winning two Croatian Cups with the club. During the 2002–03 season, Butina appeared in all 32 of Dinamo Zagreb's league matches and conceded only 27 goals, which helped the club secure its first title since 2000. On 26 February 2002, Butina was stripped of his capitancy after breaking media silence about the existing financial problems in the club. On 13 June 2003, he was transferred to the Belgian First Division side Club Brugge.

=== Club Brugge ===
In his first season with Club Brugge, Butina was a second-choice goalkeeper to Dany Verlinden, but the veteran retired the following season, and Butina became a member of the starting eleven. During the 2003–04 season, he made nine league appearances and two appearances in the UEFA Champions League. During the 2004–05 season, he conceded just 22 goals in 31 league matches as Club Brugge claimed the Belgian championship title; it was his first and only honour with the Belgian club. Butina also made two appearances in the 2004–05 UEFA Cup. The next season, he made 19 appearances in the First Division and featured in five 2005–06 UEFA Champions League group stage matches. Butina played his last match for Club Brugge on 15 February 2006 against Roma in a 2–1 defeat at Jan Breydel Stadium in the 2005–06 UEFA Cup.

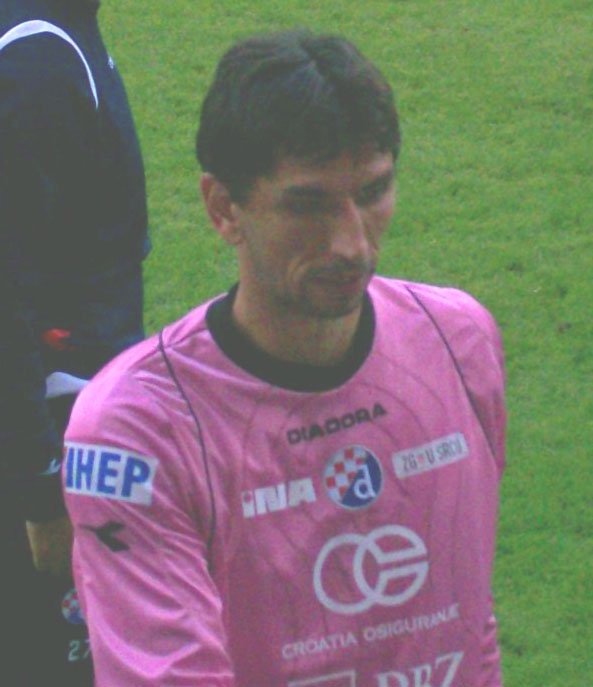
Tomislav Butina in 2008.

=== Olympiacos ===
On 16 July, Butina was transferred to Olympiacos. He appeared only in two league matches in his two seasons with the club, conceding four goals. Following his two-year spell with the Greek club, Butina decided to sign for the reigning Croatian champions Dinamo Zagreb.

=== Return to Dinamo Zagreb ===
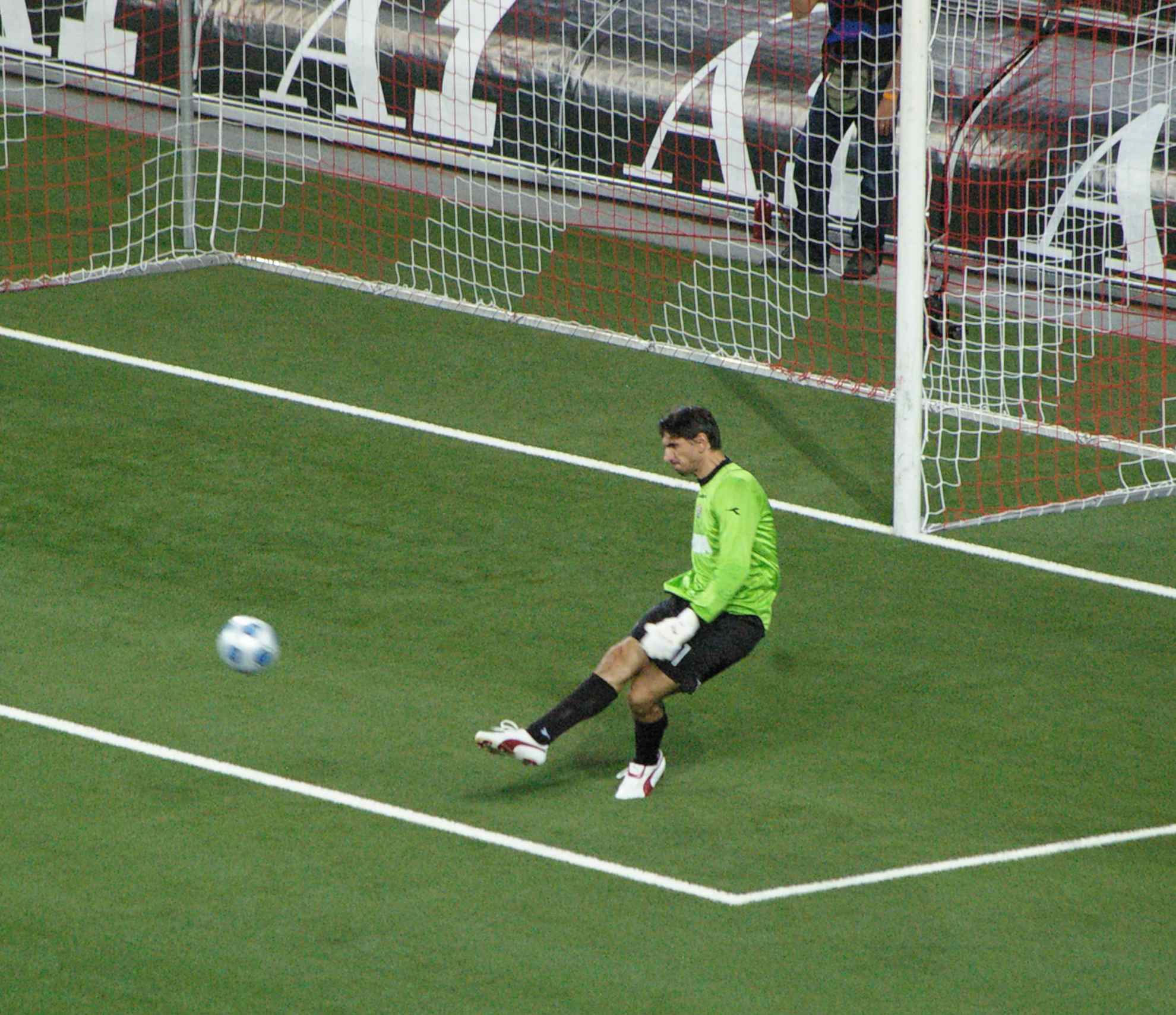
Tomislav Butina delivering a goal–kick during the Champions League qualifier vs. Red Bull Salzburg.

On 23 May 2008, exactly 15 years following his debut for the Dinamo Zagreb first team, he signed a two-year deal with the Croatian club after previously being released from his contract with Olympiacos. In first season following his return, Butina made 24 league appearances, conceding 18 goals. He also featured in three 2008–09 UEFA Champions League qualifiers, four matches in UEFA Cup and six matches in Croatian Cup which Dinamo have won third time in a row.

Butina helped the club defend the league title the next season, featuring in 25 league matches. He also made ten appearances in European competitions and four more appearances in the 2009–10 Croatian Cup. On 17 August 2010, at the start of the 2010–11 season, Butina was released from his contract with Dinamo Zagreb along with his teammate Ante Tomić. He made a total of 50 league appearances for Dinamo Zagreb following his return, also winning four domestic trophies.

== International career ==
Butina made his debut for the Croatia under-21 team on 19 April 1994, playing the full 90 minutes in a friendly match against Slovakia which finished by a goalless draw. Butina won a total of 11 international caps for the under-21 team between April 1994 and October 1995. He also played for under-20 team on one occasion, in an exhibition match against Styria.

Butina went on to make his full international debut for Croatia in their 2002 FIFA World Cup qualifier against San Marino on 5 September 2001 in Serravalle which Croatia won 4–0. Butina won a total of 28 international caps in almost five years of playing for the Croatia national football team. He made his last international appearance in Croatia's 1–0 defeat to Poland in a friendly match played on 3 June 2006 in Wolfsburg during the two teams' preparations for the 2006 FIFA World Cup tournament. It was his only international appearance in 2006.

=== 2002 World Cup ===
Butina was called to take part in a 23-man squad at the 2002 FIFA World Cup final tournament by then manager Mirko Jozić and was issued the number 12 shirt. At the tournament, he remained an unused substitute in all of the team's three group matches, serving as the second-choice goalkeeper behind Stipe Pletikosa.

=== 2004 UEFA Euro ===
Despite not making any appearances for Croatia during the UEFA Euro 2004 qualifying, Butina went on to appear in all of their three group matches at the finals in Portugal after Pletikosa was forced to withdraw from the tournament due to an injury sustained in training a few days before the first match. He was again issued a number 12 shirt. In the group stage, Croatia maintained a goalless draw against Switzerland, a 2–2 draw against France, and a 4–2 loss in the final round of the group stage against England which saw the team being eliminated from the tournament.

=== 2006 World Cup ===
Butina was able to keep his place as Croatia's first-choice goalkeeper during the 2006 World Cup qualifying and started eight out of ten matches, only being replaced by Pletikosa for the two matches that the team played in September 2005. Although Butina was part of Croatia's 23-man squad at the 2006 FIFA World Cup finals in Germany, he lost his place in the starting lineup to Pletikosa and remained an unused substitute in all of the team's three group matches. He announced his retirement from the national team a few weeks after the tournament, citing his desire to concentrate on club career and to spend more time with his family.

== Personal life ==
Butina is married and a father of two children: Magdalena (born c. 2003) and Hrvoje (born 2009). Formerly a resident of Velika Gorica, in 2009 he moved with his family to the Šalata neighborhood in Zagreb. Butina currently he resides in Dubai with his family, working as a coach in Al-Nasr youth academy.

Butina is well known as an art lover. He is interested mainly in modern Croatian art and owns a large collection of paintings, as well as an art gallery.

== Career statistics ==
Appearances and goals by club, season and competition
Club	Season	League	
Club	Season	Apps	Goals
Dinamo Zagreb	1992–93	1	0
Dinamo Zagreb	1993–94	0	0
Dinamo Zagreb	1997–98	6	0
Dinamo Zagreb	1998–99	0	0
Dinamo Zagreb	1999–2000	6	0
Dinamo Zagreb	2000–01	29	0
Dinamo Zagreb	2001–02	29	0
Dinamo Zagreb	2002–03	32	0
Dinamo Zagreb	Total	93	0
Karlovac (loan)	1994–95	0	0
Samobor (loan)	1995–96	0	0
Slaven Belupo (loan)	1996–97	0	0
Club Brugge	2003–04	9	0
Club Brugge	2004–05	33	0
Club Brugge	2005–06	19	0
Club Brugge	Total	42	0
Olympiacos	2006–07	2	0
Olympiacos	2007–08	0	0
Olympiacos	Total	2	0
Dinamo Zagreb	2008–09	24	0
Dinamo Zagreb	2009–10	25	0
Dinamo Zagreb	2010–11	1	0
Dinamo Zagreb	Total	50	0
Career total		216	0

== Honours ==
Samobor

- Croatian Second League: 1995–96 (West)

Dinamo Zagreb

- Croatian Championship (6): 1997–98, 1998–99, 1999–2000, 2002–03, 2008–09, 2009–10
- Croatian Cup: 1997–98, 2000–01, 2001–02, 2008–09
- Croatian Supercup: 2010

Club Brugge

- Belgian First Division: 2004–05
- Belgian Supercup: 2005

Olympiacos

- Super League Greece: 2006–07, 2007–08
- Greek Cup: 2007–08
- Greek Super Cup: 2007
