= Adrián Calello =

Argentine footballer (born 1987)

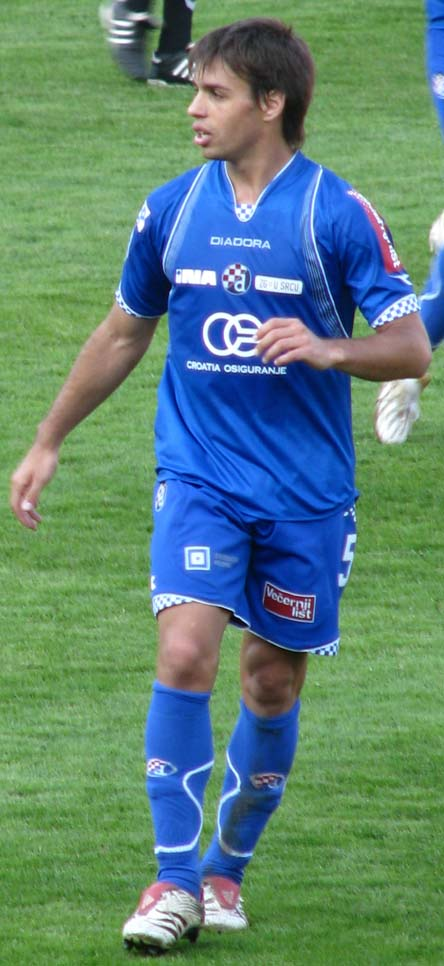
- Calello playing for Dinamo Zagreb

Personal information
- Full name: Adrián Daniel Calello
- Date of birth: 14 May 1987 (age 39)
- Place of birth: Quilmes, Argentina
- Height: 1.78 m (5 ft 10 in)
- Position: Defensive midfielder

Team information
- Current team: Quilmes

Youth career
- Independiente

Senior career*
Years	Team	Apps	(Gls)
2006–2008	Independiente	51	(0)
2009–2012	Dinamo Zagreb	75	(3)
2013	Siena	9	(0)
2013–2014	Chievo	1	(0)
2014–2015	Catania	11	(0)
2015–2017	Quilmes	49	(1)
2017–2018	Huracán	26	(0)
2018–2019	Banfield	17	(1)
2019–2020	Huracán	15	(0)
2020–	Quilmes	40	(1)
- * Club domestic league appearances and goals as of 16:19, 10 April 2022 (UTC)

Adrián Daniel Calello (locally [kaˈleʎo], Italian: [kaˈlɛllo]; born 14 May 1987) is an Argentine professional footballer who plays as a midfielder for Quilmes Atlético Club.

He started his professional career at Independiente, debuting for the first team on 24 February 2007. In the winter transfer window of the 2008–09 season he joined reigning Croatian champions Dinamo Zagreb. With the Croatian club, Calello has won two domestic league titles, one Croatian Cup and one Croatian Supercup.

== Career ==
=== Independiente ===
Calello debuted for the senior squad of Independiente on 24 February 2007 in club's home defeat against Boca Juniors 3–1. He entered the match as a 16th-minute substitute for Gastón Machín. During the 2006–07 season, Calello made 14 appearances in the closing tournament of Primera División. The following season, he made a total of 15 appearances in the opening and 9 appearances in the closing tournament. The 2008–09 season saw Calello make 13 appearances in the opening tournament before he was transferred to Croatian reigning champions Dinamo Zagreb. Calello made a total of 51 league appearances for Independiente, also featuring in one Copa Sudamericana match for the club.

=== Dinamo Zagreb ===
On 15 December 2008, Callelo was transferred to Dinamo Zagreb for a reported fee of €2.2 million. He signed a 5 1/2-year contract for his new club. His first official match for Dinamo Zagreb was a 2008–09 Prva HNL tie against the club's biggest rivals Hajduk Split on 24 February 2009. Dinamo Zagreb lost the match 2–0 and Calello was responsible for Hajduk Split scoring their first goal from a penalty-kick. He made 12 league appearances and 3 cup appearances in his debut season with the club. The 2009–10 season saw calello feature in 20 out of 30 league matches for Dinamo Zagreb. He also made three appearances in Croatian Cup and four appearances in European competitions. He scored the first goal of his professional career in a 2010–11 Prva HNL match against RNK Split, which ended up being the winning goal as Dinamo won the match 1–0.

=== Siena ===
On 31 January 2013, the board of Siena confirmed signing of Calello on a free transfer.

== Personal life ==
Like many Argentine men's footballers who share an Italian ancestry, Calello also holds an Italian passport, thanks to his descent from Spilinga (VV), in Calabria, where his father is from.

Calello is also a high level Age of Empires 2 player who plays under the alias "Carbo" for the clan Dark Side.

== Career statistics ==
As of 5 December 2012

- Note: the Croatian Cup appearances for Dinamo Zagreb can be viewed at the official website of the club nk-dinamo.hr under the section The Match.

Appearances and goals by club, season and competition
Club	Season	League			National cup (Note: Includes Croatian Cup, Coppa Italia.)		Continental		Other		Total	
Club	Season	Division	Apps	Goals	Apps	Goals	Apps	Goals	Apps	Goals	Apps	Goals
Independiente	2006–07	Primera División	14	0	–		0	0	–		14	0
Independiente	2007–08	Primera División	24	0	–		0	0	–		24	0
Independiente	2008–09	Primera División	13	0	–		1	0	–		14	0
Dinamo Zagreb	2008–09	Prva HNL	12	0	3	0	0	0	–		15	0
Dinamo Zagreb	2009–10	Prva HNL	20	0	3	0	4	0	–		27	0
Dinamo Zagreb	2010–11	Prva HNL	18	2	6	0	1 (Note: Appearance in the 2010 Croatian Supercup)	0	8	0	33	2
Dinamo Zagreb	2011–12	Prva HNL	19	1	2	0	10	0	–		31	1
Dinamo Zagreb	2012	Prva HNL	6	0	2	0	7	0	–		15	0
Siena	2013	Serie A	9	0	0	0	—		–		9	0
Chievo	2013–14	Serie A	0	0	1	0	—		–		1	0
Career total			135	3	16	0	30	0	1	0	183	3

== Honours ==
Dinamo Zagreb

- Croatian First League: 2008–09, 2009–10, 2010–11
- Croatian Cup: 2008–09, 2010–11
- Croatian Super Cup: 2010
