= Mathias Chago =

Cameroonian footballer (born 1983)

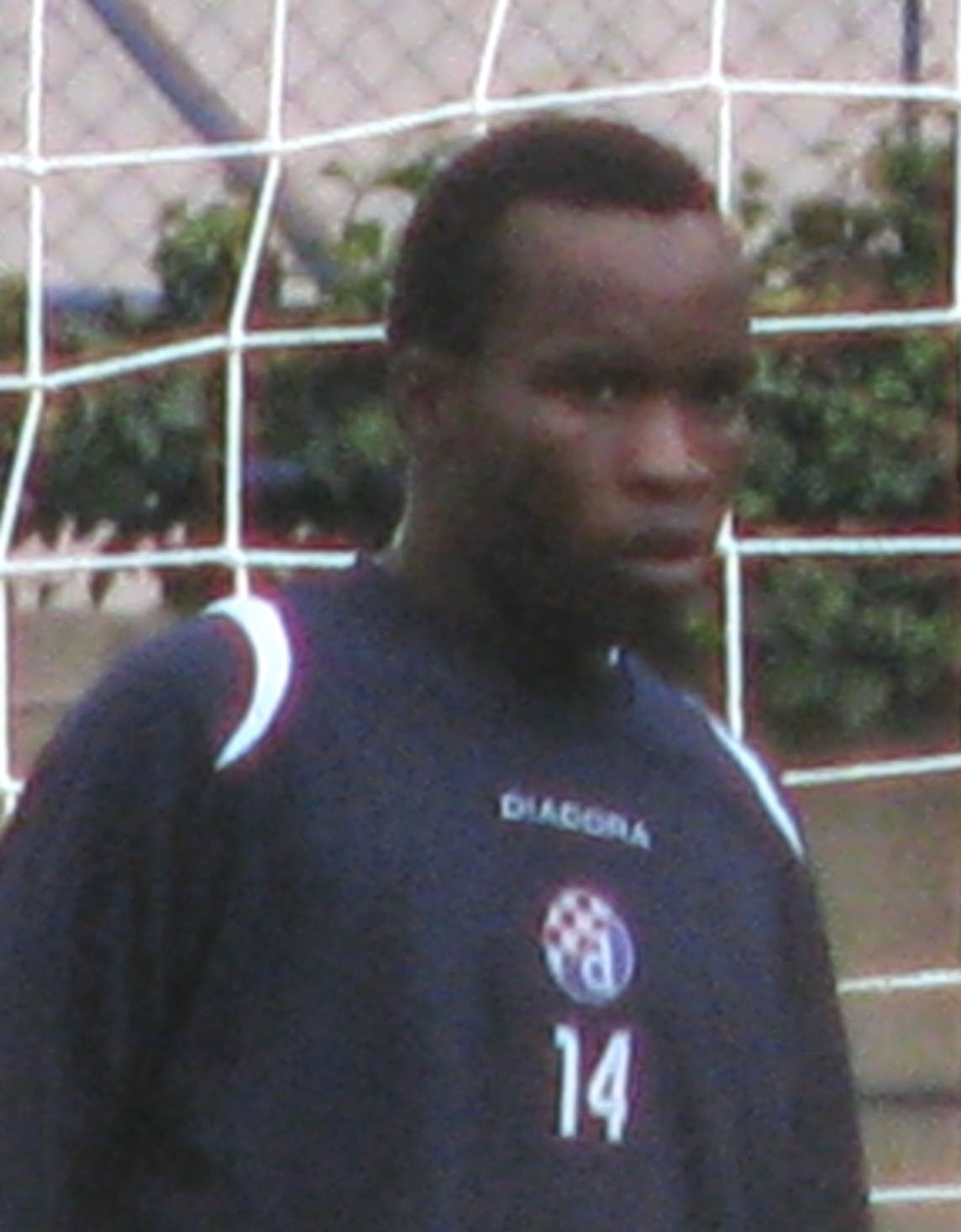
- Chago in Dinamo Zagreb colours

Personal information
- Full name: Mathias Dengoue Chago de Confiance
- Date of birth: 13 March 1983 (age 43)
- Place of birth: Bakou, Cameroon
- Height: 1.83 m (6 ft 0 in)
- Position: Midfielder

Senior career*
Years	Team	Apps	(Gls)
2000	Olympic Mvolyé		
2001–2002	Racing Bafoussam		
2002–2005	Metalac Osijek	33	(8)
2005–2013	Dinamo Zagreb	72	(7)
2010	→ Istra 1961 (loan)	12	(1)
2012–2013	→ Lokomotiva (loan)	17	(2)
2013–2014	Lokomotiva	29	(1)
2014–2017	Foolad	76	(4)
2017–2018	Lokomotiva	11	(0)

International career
2009	Cameroon	1	(0)
- * Club domestic league appearances and goals

Mathias Dellgoue Chago de Confiance (born 6 March 1983), commonly known simply as Chago, is a Cameroonian former professional footballer who played as a midfielder. Throughout his career, Chago played for Olympic Mvolyé, Racing FC Bafoussam, NK Metalac, Dinamo Zagreb and Lokomotiva and was once capped for the Cameroon at the international level in a friendly match again Ivory Coast in June 2009. As of January 2006, Chago became a Croatian citizen, which also made him eligible to play for Croatia.

== Club career ==
=== Early career in Cameroon ===
Chago started his football career at a youth club Olympic Mvolyé. There he played for two seasons before joining the MTN Elite one side Racing FC Bafoussam in 2000, where he until 2003.

=== Metalac Osijek ===
At the age of 19, Chago and two other Cameroonian players ran away to Croatia, hoping to succeed in professional football there in order to feed his family of ten brothers and sisters back in Cameroon. The manager that brought them left them broke on the streets of Zagreb. Without any money to return to Cameroon, the players did not have any choice but to stay in Croatia. Soon after the players were contacted by Croatian football icon Miroslav Blažević, who gave them his own flat to sleep at, also providing players with training sessions at the Maksimir football centre. The players had to hide from the Croatian police since they did not have the visas which were required for their prolonged stay in Croatia.

During one of the training sessions Croatian manager Boro Ivković (to who Chago also refers as his "dad") spotted Chago's talents and immediately brought him to Osijek. His new manager linked him with a Croatian second division club NK Metalac. Chago impressed everyone in his new club and was signed on a long–term deal. Chago spent three seasons playing for Metalac, before he went on a trial to Osijek's best club, first division side NK Osijek. Chago did not succeed at the trial but had another chance, this time with Dinamo Zagreb, Croatia's most successful football club.

=== Dinamo Zagreb ===
Chago was back on his way to Zagreb again, this time needing to prove his qualities in Dinamo's friendly match against Slovenian football club NK Aluminij. Having his poor family depending on him, Chago was determined to give his best in the forthcoming match and force Dinamo into signing him onto a professional contract. Before the match Chago held a speech in the dressing room for his teammates, to which he never interacted before, saying:

"Guys, I'm poor. I came all the way from Cameroon to earn money so I could feed my family. You all have contracts and earn a lot. Please, help me to play well in this match, so I can sign a contract with Dinamo."

Chago played well and amazed everyone in the club, especially the club's physios who could not believe that Chago endured the whole match with painful blisters all over his feet. An injury that required him to undertake surgery after the match. Due to his determination Chago won over hearts of his teammates and fans. With €30,000 per season contract he became able to have financial stability.

His debut season at his new club went well. At the end of Prva HNL season 2005–06 Chago had 27 league appearances, also scoring 3 goals. Unfortunately for Chago, before the start of the next season he suffered a serious anterior abdominal wall injury. Which made things worse the injury did not seem to be short–termed. This made Chago miss the whole 2006–07 campaign, making no appearances for Dinamo in that season. Meanwhile, Chago's manager Boro Ivković started negotiations with his club concerning Chago's annual wage. The new contract was signed by the player and manager, a three-year €75,000 per season deal. His salary was almost matching the salaries of the club's stars at the time, Tottenham Hotspur footballers Luka Modrić and Vedran Ćorluka.

Chago was finally back for the 2007–08 season, but struggled to make any impact since he had to be careful with his abdomen which was not completely recovered. He played a total of 10 league matches, not scoring any goals.

He continued his struggle with injuries in the next season as well. He missed out on most of the matches in the summer part of Prva HNL 2008–09, but came back fully recovered and eager to play in the winter part of the campaign. Chago made a total of 16 appearances, scoring 2 goals, including the one in the last week of the season against Dinamo's fierce rivals Hajduk Split. He also made four appearances in 2008–09 UEFA Champions League qualifying rounds and three appearances in Croatian Cup.

=== Istra 1961 (loan) ===
The next season his role in the side was again reduced, making just eight appearances in all competitions until January 2010 and so a loan to NK Istra 1961 followed where he found regular game time. At Istra, Chago made 12 out of 13 possible appearances, playing the full 90 minutes in the last 11 matches of the season.

Noticing his improvement at Istra, Dinamo brought him back to the first team squad and Chago made 24 appearances scoring two goals in the 2010–11 season.

A slipped disc injury in the 2011–12 pre-season resulted in a very long injury lay off for Chago. He missed the entire 2011–12 season and four months of the 2012–13 season.

=== Lokomotiva ===
Chago was loaned out to Dinamo partner club NK Lokomotiva. He made his return to action in the 12th round of the HNL, coming on as a half time substitute against NK Zagreb. He made a further 16 appearances that season, managing two goals and an assist, but struggled with form for the most part.

His loan to Lokomotiva was turned into a permanent move at the start of the 2013–14 season as Chago signed a two-year contract. The 2013–14 season was the best of Chago's career since his arrival in Croatia. Playing mostly as a central midfielder, he made 31 appearances in total and was appointed vice captain of the side towards the end of the season.

=== Foolad ===
On 4 July 2014, Chago agreed on a two-year contract with Iran Pro League side Foolad. He officially joined the team on 7 July 2014 after passing the club's medical tests. He signed a two-year contract with the club and was given the number 15 jersey. He made his debut for Foolad in a 2–1 loss to Tractor Sazi. Chago scored his first goal for the club on 3 April 2015 in a 2–1 victory against Esteghlal. On 29 January 2016, Chago scored the only goal of the game in a 1–0 victory over rivals Esteghlal Khuzestan.

After his contracted finished at the end of the 2015–16 season, Chago extended his contract with Foolad for one more year.

== International career ==
Chago was first called–up for the national squad on 30 May 2009, a week before Cameroon's World Cup qualifier against Morocco. On the next day he reported to Cameroon's training camp in Belgium where he started training with his new teammates. According to Chago, the national team staff was scouting him for a longer while with him knowing nothing about it. He did not make an appearance in the match against Morocco, but he started in the friendly match against Ivory Coast and played for 60 minutes before being subbed. For the sport section of the Croatian daily newspaper Večernji list, Chago gave an interview in which he stated that Samuel Eto'o encouraged him before the kick–off.

== Personal life ==
Chago was born in a poor Cameroonian family with 10 brothers and sisters. He left Cameroon in order to earn money for his family. He came to Croatia where he eventually succeeded at the top of professional football. As of 2009 Chago was living with his Croatian wife Daša and their two daughters Melissa and Marceline.

== Career statistics ==
Appearances and goals by club, season and competition (Note: The Croatian Cup appearances for Dinamo Zagreb can be viewed at the official website of the club nk-dinamo.hr under The Match section.)
Club	Season	League			Cup (Note: Includes Croatian Cup and Hazfi Cup.)		Continental		Total		Total	
Club	Season	Division	Apps	Goals	Apps	Goals	Apps	Goals	Apps	Goals	Apps	Goals
Metalac	2003–04	Druga HNL	15	5	0	0	0	0	–		15	5
Metalac	2004–05	Druga HNL	18	3	0	0	0	0	–		18	3
Metalac	Total		33	8	0	0	0	0	0	0	33	8
Dinamo Zagreb	2005–06	Prva HNL	27	3	0	0	0	0	–		27	3
Dinamo Zagreb	2006–07	Prva HNL	0	0	0	0	0	0	–		0	0
Dinamo Zagreb	2007–08	Prva HNL	10	0	1	0	4	0	–		13	0
Dinamo Zagreb	2008–09	Prva HNL	16	2	3	0	5	0	–		24	2
Dinamo Zagreb	2009–10	Prva HNL	3	0	4	1	5	0	–		12	1
Dinamo Zagreb	2010–11	Prva HNL	16	2	2	0	8	0	1 (Note: Includes the 2010 Croatian Supercup match against Hajduk Split.)	0	27	2
Dinamo Zagreb	2011–12	Prva HNL	0	0	0	0	0	0	–		0	0
Dinamo Zagreb	Total		72	7	10	1	22	0	1	0	105	8
Istra 1961 (loan)	2009–10	Prva HNL	12	1	0	0	0	0	–		12	1
Lokomotiva (loan)	2012–13	Prva HNL	17	2	6	0	0	0	–		23	2
Lokomotiva	2013–14	Prva HNL	29	1	0	0	2	0	–		31	1
Foolad	2014–15	Iran Pro League	27	1			6	0	–		33	1
Foolad	2015–16	Iran Pro League	29	3			0	0	–		29	3
Foolad	2016–17	Iran Pro League	20	0			0	0	–		20	0
Foolad	Total		76	4	0	0	6	0	0	0	82	4
Lokomotiva	2017–18	Prva HNL	11	0	4	0	0	0	–		15	0
Career total			250	23	20	1	30	0	1	0	301	24

== Honours ==
Dinamo Zagreb

- Croatian First League: 2005–06, 2007–08, 2008–09, 2009–10, 2010–11
- Croatian Cup: 2006–07, 2007–08, 2008–09, 2010–11
- Croatian Super Cup: 2006, 2010
