= Miroslav Slepička =

Czech footballer and MMA fighter (born 1981)

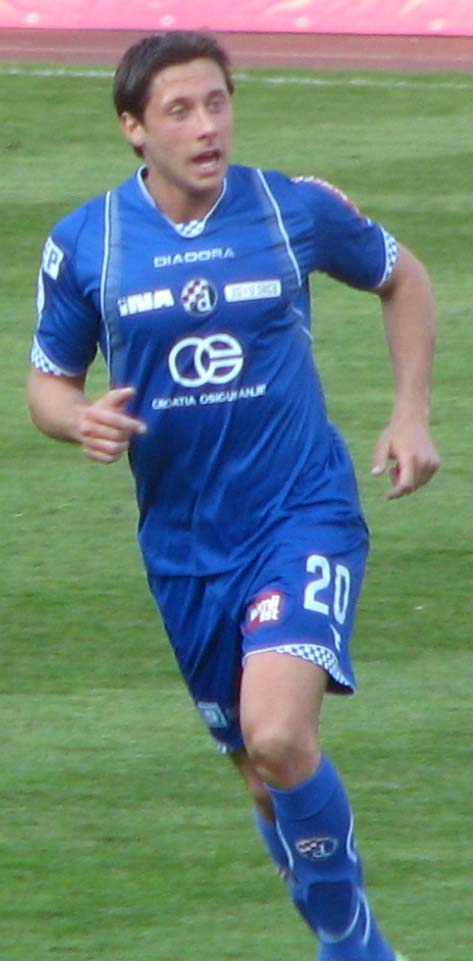
- Slepička playing for Dinamo Zagreb

Personal information
- Date of birth: 10 November 1981 (age 45)
- Place of birth: Příbram, Czechoslovakia
- Height: 1.81 m (5 ft 11 in)
- Position: Forward

Youth career
- 1991–1999: Marila Příbram

Senior career*
Years	Team	Apps	(Gls)
1999–2002	Marila Příbram	19	(0)
2001	→ ZD Milín (loan)	0	(0)
2002–2005	Slovan Liberec	86	(12)
2005–2008	Sparta Prague	55	(19)
2008–2010	Dinamo Zagreb	25	(11)
2011	→ Greuther Fürth (loan)	7	(0)
2011	Sparta Prague	5	(1)
2011–2014	Sparta Prague B		
2014	1. FK Příbram	4	(0)
2014	FC Goa	10	(5)
2015	FC Písek		
2015	FC MAS Táborsko	9	(1)
2017–2018	FC Písek		
2018–2020	1. FK Příbram	24	(4)

International career
2002	Czech Republic U20	2	(2)
2002–2003	Czech Republic U21	17	(1)
2008	Czech Republic	2	(0)
- * Club domestic league appearances and goals

Miroslav Slepička (born 10 November 1981) is a Czech former professional mixed martial artist and former professional football player.

== Football career ==
Slepička played as forward for Slovan Liberec, Sparta Prague, Dinamo Zagreb, Marila Příbram, Milín, Marila Příbram, and UD Příbram. He made two appearances for the Czech Republic national team having previously represented his country at under-20 and under-21 levels. On 10 September 2008, Slepička debuted internationally in the match against the Northern Ireland in Belfast.

== Career statistics ==
Season	Club	League	Apps	Goals
2001–02	Marila Příbram	Czech First League	19	0
2001–02	Slovan Liberec	Czech First League	2	0
2002–03	Slovan Liberec	Czech First League	23	1
2003–04	Slovan Liberec	Czech First League	23	4
2004–05	Slovan Liberec	Czech First League	28	7
2005–06	Sparta Prague	Czech First League	16	2
2006–07	Sparta Prague	Czech First League	0	0
2007–08	Sparta Prague	Czech First League	24	12
2008-09	Sparta Prague	Czech First League	15	5
2008-09	Dinamo Zagreb	Prva HNL	9	6
2009–10	Dinamo Zagreb	Prva HNL	15	4
2010–11	Dinamo Zagreb	Prva HNL	3	1
2011–12	Sparta Prague	Czech First League	7	2
2012–13	Sparta Prague	Czech First League	0	0
2013–14	1.FK Příbram	Czech First League	-	-
2014	FC Goa	Indian Super League	10	5
2015 -	FC Písek	ČFL		

Last updated on 28 January 2011
