= 2007–08 HNK Hajduk Split season =

Hajduk Split
2007–08 season
- Chairman: Branko Grgić (until 23 September 2007); Željko Jerkov (from 26 January to 10 March 2008)
- Manager: Ivan Pudar (until 21 August 2007); Sergije Krešić (from 24 August to 26 October 2007); Robert Jarni
- Prva HNL: 5th
- Croatian Cup: Runners-up
- UEFA Cup: Second qualifying round
- Top goalscorer: League: Nikola Kalinić (17); All: Nikola Kalinić (26)
- Highest home attendance: 35,000 vs Sampdoria (16 August 2007)
- Lowest home attendance: 1,500 (Five matches)
- Average home league attendance: 4,853
Home colours	Away colours

The 2007–08 season was the 97th season in Hajduk Split’s history and their seventeenth in the Prva HNL. Their 2nd place finish in the 2006–07 season meant it was their 17th successive season playing in the Prva HNL.

== First-team squad ==
Squad at end of season

Note: Flags indicate national team as defined under FIFA eligibility rules; some limited exceptions apply. Players may hold more than one non-FIFA nationality.

No.	Pos.	Nation	Player
1	GK	CRO	Miro Varvodić
3	DF	CRO	Goran Jozinović
5	DF	CRO	Jurica Buljat
6	DF	CRO	Boris Živković
7	MF	CRO	Mladen Pelaić
8	MF	CRO	Siniša Linić
9	FW	CRO	Nikola Kalinić
10	MF	ROU	Florin Cernat (on loan from Dynamo Kyiv)
11	MF	CRO	Srđan Andrić
12	GK	CRO	Vladimir Balić
13	FW	CRO	Ante Rukavina
14	MF	CRO	Marin Ljubičić
15	MF	CRO	Drago Gabrić

No.	Pos.	Nation	Player
16	FW	BIH	Mladen Bartolović
17	MF	CRO	Hrvoje Milić
18	MF	CRO	Ivan Ćurjurić
20	DF	CRO	Goran Sablić (on loan from Dynamo Kyiv)
21	FW	CRO	Duje Čop
22	DF	CRO	Mario Maloča
23	DF	CRO	Igor Tudor (captain)
25	GK	CRO	Vjekoslav Tomić
26	MF	CRO	Goran Rubil
27	GK	CRO	Božidar Radošević
28	DF	BIH	Boris Pandža
29	FW	LVA	Māris Verpakovskis (on loan from Dynamo Kyiv)
30	FW	CRO	Tomislav Bušić

=== Left club during season ===
Note: Flags indicate national team as defined under FIFA eligibility rules; some limited exceptions apply. Players may hold more than one non-FIFA nationality.

No.	Pos.	Nation	Player
4	MF	BIH	Dario Damjanović (to Luch-Energiya)
13	FW	CRO	Branko Čubrilo (loaned to Solin)
18	MF	BIH	Mirko Hrgović (to JEF United)

No.	Pos.	Nation	Player
27	MF	CRO	Niko Peraić (to Junak Sinj)
30	FW	CRO	Krešimir Makarin (loaned to Šibenik)
—	MF	CRO	Mate Maleš (to Dinamo Zagreb)

== Competitions ==
=== Overall record ===
Performance by competition
Competition	Starting round	Final position/round	First match	Last match
Prva HNL	—N/a	5th	22 July 2007	10 May 2008
Croatian Football Cup	First round	Runners-up	26 September 2007	14 May 2008
UEFA Cup	First qualifying round	Second qualifying round	19 July 2007	30 August 2007

Statistics by competition
Competition	Pld	W	D	L	GF	GA	GD	Win%
Prva HNL	33	14	10	9	57	41	+16	42.42
Croatian Football Cup	8	5	2	1	22	6	+16	62.50
UEFA Cup	4	1	2	1	3	3	+0	25.00
Total	45	20	14	11	82	50	+32	44.44

=== Prva HNL ===
==== Classification ====
Pos	Team	Pld	W	D	L	GF	GA	GD	Pts	Qualification or relegation
3	Osijek	33	16	6	11	43	34	+9	54	
4	Rijeka	33	14	11	8	53	41	+12	53	Qualification to Intertoto Cup first round
5	Hajduk Split	33	14	10	9	57	41	+16	52	Qualification to UEFA Cup first qualifying round (Note: Hajduk Split qualified for the UEFA Cup as a runner-up of the 2007–08 Croatian Football Cup.)
6	NK Zagreb	33	11	11	11	51	40	+11	44	
7	Varteks	33	11	7	15	46	53	−7	40	

Source: Sportnet.hr
Rules for classification: 1st points; 2nd goal difference; 3rd goals scored
For deciding champions, qualification for the UEFA Cup and relegation: 1st points; 2nd head-to-head points; 3rd head-to-head goal difference; 4th head-to-head away goals scored

==== Results summary ====
Overall								Home						Away					
Pld	W	D	L	GF	GA	GD	Pts	W	D	L	GF	GA	GD	W	D	L	GF	GA	GD
33	14	10	9	57	41	+16	52	10	4	3	42	20	+22	4	6	6	15	21	−6

Last updated: 10 May 2008.
Source: Sportnet.hr

==== Results by round ====
Round	1	2	3	4	5	6	7	8	9	10	11	12	13	14	15	16	17	18	19	20	21	22	23	24	25	26	27	28	29	30	31	32	33
Ground	A	H	A	H	A	H	A	H	A	A	H	H	A	H	A	H	A	H	A	H	H	A	H	A	H	A	H	A	H	H	A	H	A
Result	D	W	D	W	D	W	D	W	L	L	L	W	W	D	W	D	L	W	W	D	W	L	W	L	W	D	L	W	W	L	D	D	L
Position	6	4	5	4	4	4	5	4	5	5	6	5	3	3	3	3	4	3	3	3	3	3	3	3	2	2	4	3	2	2	2	4	5

Source: Competitive matches
A = Away; H = Home; W = Win; D = Draw; L = Loss

==== Results by opponent ====
Team	Results			Points
Team	1	2	3	Points
Cibalia	0–0	2–2	1–2	2
Dinamo Zagreb	1–2	0–1	1–1	1
Inter Zaprešić	7–1	1–0	7–2	9
Međimurje	1–1	3–3	2–2	3
Osijek	1–0	1–0	0–2	6
Rijeka	0–4	1–1	1–1	2
Slaven Belupo	2–2	1–0	2–0	7
Šibenik	0–1	2–0	4–1	6
Varteks	3–1	3–1	0–4	6
Zadar	0–0	4–1	3–1	7
NK Zagreb	2–1	0–1	1–2	3

Source: 2007–08 Croatian First Football League article

== Matches ==
=== Prva HNL ===
22 July 2007 1	Zadar	0–0	Hajduk Split	Zadar
18:00 CEST (UTC+02:00)	J. Modrić (yellow card) 59'	Report	Hrgović (yellow card) 40'; Musa (yellow card) 46'; J. Buljat (yellow card) 71'	Stadium: Stadion Stanovi; Attendance: 10,000; Referee: Ivo Krečak (Šibenik)

28 July 2007 2	Hajduk Split	7–1	Inter Zaprešić	Split
20:05 CEST (UTC+02:00)	Kalinić 15', 48'; Rukavina 32' (pen.), 84', 86'; Pandža (yellow card) 66'; Cernat 69', 72'	Report	Kukec 64'	Stadium: Stadion Poljud; Attendance: 6,000; Referee: Damir Batinić (Osijek)

5 August 2007 3	Cibalia	0–0	Hajduk Split	Vinkovci
17:30 CEST (UTC+02:00)	Medvid (yellow card) 35'; Maroslavac (yellow card) 41'; Vuka (yellow card) 59'; Kerić (yellow card) 60'; Radotić (yellow card) 65'	Report	Hrgović (yellow card) 33'; Ljubičić (yellow card) 82'	Stadium: Stadion HNK Cibalia; Attendance: 5,000; Referee: Ivan Bebek (Rijeka)

11 August 2007 4	Hajduk Split	1–0	Osijek	Split
20:00 CEST (UTC+02:00)	Kalinić 9' (yellow card) 35'; Andrić (yellow card) 16'; Hrgović (yellow card) 59'; Živković (yellow card) 90'	Report	Pranjić (yellow card) 27'; Jukić (yellow card) 59'; Skender (yellow card) 67'	Stadium: Stadion Poljud; Attendance: 10,000; Referee: Vlado Svilokos (Sisak)

19 August 2007 5	Međimurje	1–1	Hajduk Split	Čakovec
17:00 CEST (UTC+02:00)	Šaranović 1'; Bašić (red card) 84'; Conkaš (yellow card) 90'	Report	Ljubičić (yellow card) 33'; Linić (yellow card) 63'; Rubil 90'	Stadium: Stadion SRC Mladost; Attendance: 5,000; Referee: Domagoj Vučkov (Rijeka)

25 August 2007 6	Hajduk Split	2–1	NK Zagreb	Split
19:00 CEST (UTC+02:00)	Bartolović 14' (yellow card) 38'; Kalinić 27'; Andrić (yellow card) 57'	Report	Labudović (yellow card) 24'; Lovrek (yellow card) 35' (goal) 47'	Stadium: Stadion Poljud; Attendance: 5,000; Referee: Ivo Krečak (Šibenik)

2 September 2007 7	Slaven Belupo	2–2	Hajduk Split	Koprivnica
20:05 CEST (UTC+02:00)	Kristić 8'; Vručina 40' (yellow card) 40'; Kresinger (yellow card) 45'; Poljak (yellow card) 65'	Report	Rukavina 5'; Cernat (yellow card) 29'; Oremuš 78'	Stadium: Gradski stadion Attendance: 4,000; Referee: Ante Vučemilović-Šimunović (Osijek)

15 September 2007 8	Hajduk Split	3–1	Varteks	Split
19:00 CEST (UTC+02:00)	Kalinić 4', 27' (pen.) (yellow card) 8'; Andrić (yellow card) 31'; Cernat (yellow card) 39' (goal) 89'	Report	Mađarić (yellow card) 26'; Mumlek (yellow card) 33'; Conjar 48'	Stadium: Stadion Poljud; Attendance: 4,000; Referee: Bruno Marić (Daruvar)

22 September 2007 9	Rijeka	4–0	Hajduk Split	Rijeka
20:05 CEST (UTC+02:00)	An. Sharbini (yellow card) 15' (goal) 24'; Ivanov (yellow card) 43' (goal) 74' (pen.); Škoro 51'; Bule (yellow card) 64'; Đalović 90+3'	Report	Kalinić (yellow card) 29'; Pandža (yellow card) 37'; Hrgović (yellow card) 71'	Stadium: Stadion Kantrida; Attendance: 8,000; Referee: Zlatko Šimčić (Koprivnica)

29 September 2007 10	Šibenik	1–0	Hajduk Split	Šibenik
16:00 CEST (UTC+02:00)	Kulušić (yellow card) 24'; Lapić (yellow card) 38'; Milanović (yellow card) 54'; Tabi (yellow card) 57'; Vitaić 74'	Report	J. Buljat (yellow card) 56'; Andrić (yellow card) 86'	Stadium: Stadion Šubićevac; Attendance: 5,000; Referee: Marijo Strahonja (Zagreb)

7 October 2007 11	Hajduk Split	1–2	Dinamo Zagreb	Split
20:05 CEST (UTC+02:00)	Kalinić (yellow card) 42' (goal) 79'; Hrgović (yellow card) 45'; Pelaić (yellow card) 79'	Report	Modrić 11'; Mandžukić 71' (yellow card) 86'; Drpić (yellow card) 76'; Carlos (yellow card) 79'	Stadium: Stadion Poljud; Attendance: 18,000; Referee: Ivan Bebek (Rijeka)

20 October 2007 12	Hajduk Split	4–1	Zadar	Split
15:30 CEST (UTC+02:00)	Kalinić (penalty missed) 17' (yellow card) 23' (goal) 36', 53', 74'; J. Buljat (yellow card) 34'; Damjanović (yellow card) 43'; Linić 70'	Report	Balašković (yellow card) 15'; Terkeš 21'; Surać (yellow card) 81'; Parmaković (yellow card) 90'	Stadium: Stadion Poljud; Attendance: 2,000; Referee: Marijo Strahonja (Zagreb)

27 October 2007 13	Inter Zaprešić	0–1	Hajduk Split	Zaprešić
17:00 CEST (UTC+02:00)	Starčević (yellow card) 7'	Report	Kalinić 4' (yellow card) 40'; Linić (yellow card) 27'; Damjanović (yellow card) 44'	Stadium: Stadion ŠRC Zaprešić; Attendance: 4,000; Referee: Domagoj Ljubičić (Osijek)

31 October 2007 14	Hajduk Split	2–2	Cibalia	Split
17:00 CET (UTC+01:00)	Rubil 8'; Damjanović (yellow card) 33'; Pelaić (yellow card) 41'; Verpakovskis 83'	Report	Zore (yellow card) 50'; Bagarić (yellow card) 53'; Malčić 57', 76'; Grgić (yellow card) 85'; Medvid (yellow card) 90'	Stadium: Stadion Poljud; Attendance: 1,500; Referee: Danijel Trampus (Osijek)

3 November 2007 15	Osijek	0–1	Hajduk Split	Osijek
20:05 CET (UTC+01:00)	Vuica (yellow card) 23'	Report	Verpakovskis (yellow card) 90'; Tudor 90+3'	Stadium: Stadion Gradski vrt Attendance: 5,000; Referee: Marijo Strahonja (Zagreb)

10 November 2007 16	Hajduk Split	3–3	Međimurje	Split
16:00 CET (UTC+01:00)	Cernat 17'; Kalinić 28'; Verpakovskis 50'; J. Buljat (yellow card) 59' (yellow-red card) 88'	Report	Darmopil 28' (yellow card) 33'; Piškor (yellow card) 41' (goal) 54'; Bratković (yellow card) 44'; Celišćak (yellow card) 59'; Peraica 62'; Georgievski (yellow card) 69'; Banović (yellow card) 90'	Stadium: Stadion Poljud; Attendance: 2,500; Referee: Bruno Marić (Daruvar)

24 November 2007 17	NK Zagreb	1–0	Hajduk Split	Zagreb
13:00 CET (UTC+01:00)	Ibričić 15'; Kartelo (yellow card) 20'; Brkljača (yellow card) 34'; Lovrek (yellow card) 90'	Report	Ljubičić (red card) 17'; Hrgović (yellow card) 18'; Tudor (red card) 45'	Stadium: Stadion Kranjčevićeva; Attendance: 3,000; Referee: Vlado Svilokos (Sisak)

1 December 2007 18	Hajduk Split	1–0	Slaven Belupo	Split
20:05 CET (UTC+01:00)	Kalinić (yellow card) 24' (goal) 57' (pen.); Cernat (yellow card) 45'; Balić (yellow card) 90'	Report	Poljak (yellow card) 25'; Radeljić (yellow card) 41'; Bošnjak (yellow card) 59'; Kristić (yellow card) 70'; Šiklić (yellow card) 75'	Stadium: Stadion Poljud; Attendance: 1,500; Referee: Danijel Trampus (Osijek)

8 December 2007 19	Varteks	1–3	Hajduk Split	Varaždin
15:30 CET (UTC+01:00)	Balajić (yellow card) 25'; Fábio (yellow card) 52'; Lučić 62' (pen.) (yellow card) 72'; Golik (yellow card) 64'; Ivančić (yellow card) 71'; Šimek (yellow card) 83'	Report	Linić 6' (yellow card) 10'; Hrgović 21' (pen.), 45' (yellow card) 10'; Ljubičić (yellow card) 23'; Tudor (yellow card) 61'; Gabrić (yellow card) 81'	Stadium: Stadion Varteks; Attendance: 5,000; Referee: Bruno Marić (Daruvar)

23 February 2008 20	Hajduk Split	1–1	Rijeka	Split
20:05 CET (UTC+01:00)	Rukavina (penalty missed) 18'; Verpakovskis 19'; Gabrić (yellow card) 22'; Hrgović (yellow card) 35'; Rukavina (yellow card) 69'	Report	An. Sharbini 5'; Čagalj (red card) 17'; Đalović (yellow card) 19'; Vučko (yellow card) 50'; Škoro (yellow card) 50'; Žilić (yellow card) 90'	Stadium: Stadion Poljud; Attendance: 8,000; Referee: Igor Križarić (Čakovec)

1 March 2008 21	Hajduk Split	2–0	Šibenik	Split
17:00 CET (UTC+01:00)	Živković 36' (yellow card) 69'; Verpakovskis 45'; Čop (yellow card) 77'	Report	Tabi (yellow card) 24'; Bulat (yellow card) 39'; Milanović (yellow card) 42'; Raić (yellow card) 43'	Stadium: Stadion Poljud; Attendance: 2,500; Referee: Damir Batinić (Osijek)

8 March 2008 22	Dinamo Zagreb	1–0	Hajduk Split	Zagreb
20:15 CET (UTC+01:00)	Vrdoljak 37'; Mikulić (yellow card) 44'; Koch (yellow card) 78'; Vukojević (yellow card) 85'	Report	Linić (yellow card) 11'; Rukavina (yellow card) 23'; Andrić (yellow card) 53'; Čop (yellow card) 55'	Stadium: Stadion Maksimir; Attendance: 15,000; Referee: Ivan Bebek (Rijeka)

15 March 2008 23	Hajduk Split	4–1	Šibenik	Split
17:00 CET (UTC+01:00)	Kalinić 17', 38' (pen.); Verpakovskis 50' (yellow card) 90'; Andrić 77'	Report	Gabriel 7'; Vitaić (penalty missed) 21'	Stadium: Stadion Poljud; Attendance: 3,000; Referee: Andrej Burilo (Osijek)

19 March 2008 24	Varteks	4–0	Hajduk Split	Varaždin
16:30 CET (UTC+01:00)	Smrekar 5', 27'; Mujanović 30', 35'; Brezovec (yellow card) 31'; Šimek (yellow card) 49'; Golik (yellow card) 53'; Novinić (yellow card) 89'	Report	Verpakovskis (yellow card) 22'; Linić (yellow card) 85'; Ljubičić (yellow card) 86'	Stadium: Stadion Varteks; Attendance: 4,000; Referee: Domagoj Vučkov (Rijeka)

22 March 2008 25	Hajduk Split	7–2	Inter Zaprešić	Split
15:00 CET (UTC+01:00)	Cernat 7', 28'; Rukavina 11' (yellow card) 80'; Rubil 17'; Andrić 52' (yellow card) 79'; Živković 63'; Maloča (yellow card) 68'; Gabrić 90'	Report	Grgurović (yellow card) 18'; Kukec 44', 82'; Iftić (yellow card) 53'; Lovren (yellow card) 53'; Krznar (yellow card) 62'	Stadium: Stadion Poljud; Attendance: 1,500; Referee: Ante Vučemilović-Šimunović (Osijek)

29 March 2008 26	Međimurje	2–2	Hajduk Split	Čakovec
15:00 CET (UTC+01:00)	Georgievski (yellow card) 43'; Eliomar 65'; Darmopil 68'; Pintarić (yellow card) 76'; Milardović (yellow card) 85'	Report	Kalinić 13'; Cernat 34'; Verpakovskis (yellow card) 83'	Stadium: Stadion SRC Mladost; Attendance: 4,000; Referee: Domagoj Ljubičić (Osijek)

12 April 2008 28	Zadar	1–3	Hajduk Split	Zadar
16:00 CEST (UTC+02:00)	Mitrović (yellow card) 45' (goal) 77' (pen.); Elez (yellow card) 55'; Subašić (yellow card) 64'; Bilaver (yellow card) 90'	Report	Kalinić (yellow card) 6'; Rukavina 19', 32'; Cernat 49'; Andrić (yellow card) 90'	Stadium: Stadion Stanovi; Attendance: 4,500; Referee: Hrvoje Kurtović (Osijek)

16 April 2008 29	Hajduk Split	2–0	Slaven Belupo	Split
20:05 CEST (UTC+02:00)	Gabrić (yellow card) 37' (goal) 90'; Rukavina 42'; Linić (yellow card) 52'	Report	Poljak (yellow card) 36'	Stadium: Stadion Poljud; Attendance: 3,000; Referee: Ante Vučemilović-Šimunović (Osijek)

19 April 2008 30	Hajduk Split	1–2	Cibalia	Split
18:00 CEST (UTC+02:00)	Kalinić 31'	Report	Husić 4'; Jurić (yellow card) 33'; Andričević (red card) 51'; Malčić (yellow card) 70'; Bagarić 75'	Stadium: Stadion Poljud; Attendance: 3,500; Referee: Marko Matoc (Zaprešić)

26 April 2008 31	Rijeka	1–1	Hajduk Split	Rijeka
20:05 CEST (UTC+02:00)	Šafarić (yellow card) 14'; Vučko (yellow card) 35' (yellow-red card) 76'; Čagalj (yellow card) 40' (yellow-red card) 90+5'; Tadejević (yellow card) 90'; An. Sharbini 90+1'	Report	Čop 5'; Andrić (yellow card) 50'; Kalinić (yellow card) 89'	Stadium: Stadion Kantrida; Attendance: 4,000; Referee: Marijo Strahonja (Zagreb)

29 April 2008 27	Hajduk Split	0–2	Osijek	Split
18:00 CEST (UTC+02:00)	J. Buljat (yellow card) 5'; Cernat (penalty missed) 64'; Maloča (yellow card) 70'; Bušić (yellow card) 90'	Report	Višević (yellow card) 17'; Primorac 27', 47'; Todorčev (yellow card) 37'; Vida (yellow card) 63'; Smoje (yellow card) 63' (yellow-red card) 90'; Pavličić (yellow card) 84'	Stadium: Stadion Poljud; Attendance: 1,500; Referee: Danijel Trampus (Osijek)

3 May 2008 32	Hajduk Split	1–1	Dinamo Zagreb	Split
20:05 CEST (UTC+02:00)	Rukavina 35'; Gabrić (yellow card) 61'; Živković (yellow card) 90'	Report	Etto (yellow card) 28' (goal) 79'; Mandžukić (yellow card) 90'	Stadium: Stadion Poljud; Attendance: 10,000; Referee: Ante Vučemilović-Šimunović (Osijek)

10 May 2008 33	NK Zagreb	2–1	Hajduk Split	Zagreb
16:00 CEST (UTC+02:00)	Jurendić 57'; Ibričić 62' (pen.); Džidić (yellow card) 81'; Mujdža (yellow card) 84'; Lovrek (yellow card) 88'	Report	Bartolović (yellow card) 45'; Linić 76'	Stadium: Stadion Kranjčevićeva; Attendance: 1,800; Referee: Zlatko Šimčić (Koprivnica)

Source: HRnogomet.com

=== Croatian Football Cup ===
25 September 2007 R1	Mladost Molve	1–9	Hajduk Split	Molve
15:30 CEST (UTC+02:00)	Mlakar 66'	Report	Kalinić 10', 12', 31', 41'; Makarin 27', 44', 56', 80'; Rukavina 51'	Stadium: Stadion Petar Focić-Krbuljin; Attendance: 1,200; Referee: Ante Vučemilović-Šimunović (Osijek)

23 October 2007 R2	Hajduk Split	2–0	Croatia Sesvete	Split
16:00 CEST (UTC+02:00)	Sablić 52'; Hrgović (yellow card) 65'; Linić (yellow card) 71'; J. Buljat (yellow card) 72'; Kalinić 86'	Report	Barišić (yellow card) 40' (yellow-red card) 83'; Karabogdan (yellow card) 86'	Stadium: Stadion Poljud; Attendance: 2,000; Referee: Domagoj Vučkov (Rijeka)

7 November 2007 QF	Hajduk Split	2–1	Inter Zaprešić	Split
17:00 CET (UTC+01:00)	Kalinić 3' (pen.); Pelaić 42'; Bartolović (yellow card) 77'	Report	Starčević (yellow card) 2'; Cavrić (yellow card) 22'; Sivonjić 71'	Stadium: Stadion Poljud; Attendance: 1,500; Referee: Danijel Trampus (Osijek)

27 November 2007 QF	Inter Zaprešić	0–4 (1–6 agg.)	Hajduk Split	Zaprešić
17:00 CET (UTC+01:00)	Šarlija (yellow card) 14'; Rašić (yellow card) 54'; Starčević (yellow card) 70' (yellow-red card) 78'	Report	Kalinić 14' (pen.), 24' (yellow card); Cernat 29'; Pelaić (yellow card) 54'; Hrgović 86'	Stadium: Stadion ŠRC Zaprešić; Attendance: 1,000; Referee: Vlado Svilokos (Sisak)

9 April 2008 SF	Varteks	1–1	Hajduk Split	Varaždin
18:00 CEST (UTC+02:00)	Papa (yellow card) 19'; Novinić 26'; Mujanović (yellow card) 44'; Brezovec (yellow card) 61'; Golik (yellow card) 74'	Report	Verpakovskis (yellow card) 19'; Andrić (yellow card) 31'; Pelaić (yellow card) 38' (red card) 48'; Rukavina (yellow card) 38'; Maloča 66'	Stadium: Stadion Varteks; Attendance: 2,500; Referee: Damir Batinić (Osijek)

23 April 2008 SF	Hajduk Split	4–0 (5–1 agg.)	Varteks	Split
17:00 CEST (UTC+02:00)	Cernat 15'; Rukavina 32', 60'; Kalinić 45' (pen.); Gabrić (yellow card) 48'	Report	Brezovec (yellow card) 76'	Stadium: Stadion Poljud; Attendance: 10,000; Referee: Vlado Svilokos (Sisak)

7 May 2008 Final	Dinamo Zagreb	3–0	Hajduk Split	Zagreb
17:30 CEST (UTC+02:00)	Tadić 8'; Mandžukić 20', 88'	Report	Sablić (yellow card) 23'; Ljubičić (yellow card) 64'; Kalinić (yellow card) 77'	Stadium: Stadion Maksimir; Attendance: 15,000; Referee: Domagoj Ljubičić (Osijek)

14 May 2008 Final	Hajduk Split	0–0 (0–3 agg.)	Dinamo Zagreb	Split
17:30 CEST (UTC+02:00)	Balić (red card) 19'; Ljubičić (yellow card) 24'; Maloča (yellow card) 45'	Report	Čale (red card) 19'; Mikić (yellow card) 19'; Mandžukić (yellow card) 45' (yellow-red card) 69'; M. Buljat (yellow card) 67'	Stadium: Stadion Poljud; Attendance: 6,000; Referee: Ivan Bebek (Rijeka)

Source: HRnogomet.com

=== UEFA Cup ===
==== First qualifying round ====
19 July 2007 First leg	Budućnost Podgorica (Montenegro)	1–1	(Croatia) Hajduk Split	Podgorica, Montenegro
20:30 CEST (UTC+02:00)	Vukčević (yellow card) 42'; Šćepanović 59'; Vuković (yellow card) 62'	Report	Hrgović 28'; Andrić (yellow card) 52'; Čubrilo (yellow card) 90'	Stadium: Podgorica City Stadium; Attendance: 13,000; Referee: Asaf Kenan (Israel)

2 August 2007 Second leg	Hajduk Split (Croatia)	1–0 (2–1 agg.)	(Montenegro) Budućnost Podgorica	Split, Croatia
20:15 CEST (UTC+02:00)	Damjanović 46' (yellow card) 67'; Živković (yellow card) 84'	Report	Vlahović (yellow card) 37'; Đurišić (yellow card) 42'; Lakić (yellow card) 57'; Božović (yellow card) 84'	Stadium: Stadion Poljud; Attendance: 30,000; Referee: Christoforos Zografos (Greece)

==== Second qualifying round ====
16 August 2007 First leg	Hajduk Split (Croatia)	0–1	(Italy) Sampdoria	Split, Croatia
20:45 CEST (UTC+02:00)	Kalinić (yellow card) 30'; Andrić (yellow card) 72'	Report	Campagnaro 44'; Sala (yellow card) 61'; Lucchini (yellow card) 74'; Montella (yellow card) 79'; Ziegler (yellow card) 82'	Stadium: Stadion Poljud; Attendance: 35,000; Referee: Bruno Paixão (Portugal)

30 August 2007 Second leg	Sampdoria (Italy)	1–1 (2–1 agg.)	(Croatia) Hajduk Split	Genoa, Italy
20:45 CEST (UTC+02:00)	Montella 34' (pen.); Lucchini (yellow card) 36'; Sala (yellow card) 40'	Report	Pelaić (yellow card) 35'; Hrgović (yellow card) 53' (goal) 83'	Stadium: Stadio Luigi Ferraris; Attendance: 21,367; Referee: Pavel Královec (Czech Republic)

Source: uefa.com

== Player seasonal records ==
=== Top scorers ===
Rank	Name	League	Europe	Cup	Total
1	(Croatia) Nikola Kalinić	17	–	9	26
2	(Croatia) Ante Rukavina	9	–	3	12
3	(Romania) Florin Cernat	8	–	2	10
4	(Bosnia and Herzegovina) Mirko Hrgović	2	2	1	5
4	(Latvia) Māris Verpakovskis	5	–	–	5
6	(Croatia) Krešimir Makarin	–	–	4	4
7	(Croatia) Goran Rubil	3	–	–	3
7	(Croatia) Siniša Linić	3	–	–	3
9	(Croatia) Srđan Andrić	2	–	–	2
9	(Croatia) Drago Gabrić	2	–	–	2
9	(Croatia) Boris Živković	2	–	–	2
12	(Bosnia and Herzegovina) Mladen Bartolović	1	–	–	1
12	(Croatia) Duje Čop	1	–	–	1
12	(Bosnia and Herzegovina) Dario Damjanović	–	1	–	1
12	(Croatia) Mario Maloča	–	–	1	1
12	(Croatia) Mirko Oremuš	1	–	–	1
12	(Croatia) Mladen Pelaić	–	–	1	1
12	(Croatia) Goran Sablić	–	–	1	1
12	(Croatia) Igor Tudor	1	–	–	1
	TOTALS	57	3	22	82

Source: Competitive matches

== See also ==
- 2007–08 Croatian First Football League
- 2007–08 Croatian Football Cup

== External sources ==
- 2007–08 Prva HNL at HRnogomet.com
- 2007–08 Croatian Cup at HRnogomet.com
- 2007–08 UEFA Cup at rsssf.com
