= 2007–08 NK Dinamo Zagreb season =

Dinamo Zagreb
2007–08 season
- Chairman: (Croatia) Mirko Barišić
- Manager: (Croatia) Branko Ivanković (until 14 January 2008) (Croatia) Zvonimir Soldo (until 14 May 2009)
- Prva HNL: 1st
- Croatian Cup: Winners
- UEFA Champions League: Third qualifying round
- UEFA Cup: Group stage
- Top goalscorer: League: Luka Modrić (13); All: Mario Mandžukić (20)

This article shows statistics of individual players for the football club Dinamo Zagreb It also lists all matches that Dinamo Zagreb played in the 2007–08 season.

== Competitions ==
=== Overall ===
Competition	Started round	Current position / round	Final position / round	First match	Last Match
Prva HNL	–	–	1st	21 July	10 May
UEFA Champions League	QR1	–	QR3	17 July	29 August
UEFA Cup	R1	–	Group stage	20 September	20 December
Croatian Cup	First round	–	Winners	26 September	14 May

=== Prva HNL ===
==== Classification ====
Pos	Team	Pld	W	D	L	GF	GA	GD	Pts	Qualification or relegation
1	Dinamo Zagreb (C)	33	26	4	3	91	34	+57	82	Qualification to Champions League first qualifying round
2	Slaven Belupo	33	16	6	11	45	29	+16	54	Qualification to UEFA Cup first qualifying round (Note: Hajduk Split qualified for the UEFA Cup as a runner-up of the 2007–08 Croatian Football Cup.)
3	Osijek	33	16	6	11	43	34	+9	54	
4	Rijeka	33	14	11	8	53	41	+12	53	Qualification to Intertoto Cup first round
5	Hajduk Split	33	14	10	9	57	41	+16	52	Qualification to UEFA Cup first qualifying round

Source: Sportnet.hr
Rules for classification: 1st points; 2nd goal difference; 3rd goals scored
For deciding champions, qualification for the UEFA Cup and relegation: 1st points; 2nd head-to-head points; 3rd head-to-head goal difference; 4th head-to-head away goals scored
(C) Champions

==== Results summary ====
Overall								Home						Away					
Pld	W	D	L	GF	GA	GD	Pts	W	D	L	GF	GA	GD	W	D	L	GF	GA	GD
33	26	4	3	91	34	+57	82	16	0	1	54	12	+42	10	4	2	37	22	+15

Last updated: 10 May.
Source: Sportnet.hr

==== Results by round ====
Round	1	2	3	4	5	6	7	8	9	10	11	12	13	14	15	16	17	18	19	20	21	22	23	24	25	26	27	28	29	30	31	32	33
Ground	H	H	A	H	A	H	A	H	A	H	A	A	A	H	A	H	A	H	A	H	A	H	H	A	H	A	H	A	H	A	H	A	H
Result	W	W	W	W	W	W	W	W	L	W	W	W	W	W	W	W	D	W	L	L	W	W	W	D	W	D	W	W	W	W	W	D	W

Updated to match(es) played on 10 May. Source: Competitive matches
A = Away; H = Home; W = Win; D = Draw; L = Loss

==== Results by opponent ====
Team	Results			Points
Team	1	2	3	Points
Cibalia	2–1	2–1	4–0	9
Hajduk Split	2–1	1–0	1–1	7
Inter Zaprešić	4–0	5–0	1–0	9
Međimurje	3–1	1–1	2–1	7
Osijek	3–1	1–0	3–2	9
Rijeka	1–0	4–2	6–1	9
Slaven Belupo	4–0	2–5	1–0	6
Šibenik	5–0	2–0	5–1	9
Varteks	3–4	1–2	1–1	1
Zadar	5–1	2–1	5–2	9
NK Zagreb	3–1	6–3	0–0	7

Source: Prva HNL 2007–08 article

=== UEFA Cup ===
==== Classification ====
Pos	Team	Pld	W	D	L	GF	GA	GD	Pts	Qualification	HSV	BAS	BRA	DZ	REN
1	(Germany) Hamburger SV	4	3	1	0	7	1	+6	10	Advance to knockout stage	—	1–1	—	—	3–0
2	(Switzerland) Basel	4	2	2	0	3	1	+2	8	Advance to knockout stage	—	—	1–0	—	1–0
3	(Norway) Brann	4	1	1	2	3	4	−1	4	Advance to knockout stage	0–1	—	—	2–1	—
4	(Croatia) Dinamo Zagreb	4	0	2	2	2	5	−3	2		0–2	0–0	—	—	—
5	(France) Rennes	4	0	2	2	2	6	−4	2		—	—	1–1	1–1	—

== Matches ==
=== Competitive ===
Match	Date	Tournament	Round	Ground	Opponent	Score	Attendance	Dinamo Scorers
1	17 July	Champions League	QR1	A (Azerbaijan)	Khazar Lankaran (Azerbaijan)	1–1		Etto
2	21 July	Prva HNL	1	H	Šibenik	5–0	4,000	Modrić (2), Mandžukić; Sammir, Vukojević
3	24 July	Champions League	QR1	H	Khazar Lankaran (Azerbaijan)	3–1 (aet)		Vugrinec, Mandžukić, Tadić
4	28 July	Prva HNL	2	H	Zadar	5–1	12,000	Mandžukić, Sammir, Vukojević, Schildenfeld, Šokota
5	1 August	Champions League	QR2	A (Slovenia)	Domžale (Slovenia)	2–1		Šokota, Modrić
6	4 August	Prva HNL	3	A	Inter Zaprešić	4–0	3,000	Modrić, Jertec; Mandžukić, Skulić (o.g.)
7	7 August	Champions League	QR2	H	Domžale (Slovenia)	3–1		Vukojević, Šokota, Sammir
8	10 August	Prva HNL	4	H	Cibalia	2–1	2,500	Modrić, Balaban
9	15 August	Champions League	QR3	A (Germany)	Werder Bremen (Germany)	1–2		Balaban
10	19 August	Prva HNL	5	A	Osijek	3–1	12,000	Modrić (2), Balaban
11	25 August	Prva HNL	6	H	Međimurje	3–1	15,000	Pokrivač, Mandžukić, Vukojević
12	29 August	Champions League	QR3	H	Werder Bremen (Germany)	2–3		Vukojević, Modrić
13	1 September	Prva HNL	7	A	NK Zagreb	3–1	2,500	Pokrivač, Mandžukić (2)
14	15 September	Prva HNL	8	H	Slaven Belupo	4–0	15,000	Balaban (2), Pokrivač, Modrić
15	20 September	UEFA Cup	R1	H	Ajax (Netherlands)	0–1		
16	23 September	Prva HNL	9	A	Varteks	3–4	5,000	Pokrivač, Balaban, Modrić
17	26 September	Croatian Cup	1st round	A	NK Virovitica	3–1 (aet)	5,000	Balaban (2), Mandžukić
18	29 September	Prva HNL	10	H	Rijeka	1–0	8,000	Vukojević
19	4 October	UEFA Cup	R1	A (Netherlands)	Ajax (Netherlands)	3–2 (aet)		Modrić, Mandžukić (2)
20	7 October	Prva HNL	11	A	Hajduk Split	2–1	18,000	Modrić, Mandžukić
21	20 October	Prva HNL	12	A	Šibenik	2–0	2,500	Vukojević, Šokota
22	24 October	Croatian Cup	2nd round	A	Šibenik	3–2		Mandžukić, Šokota (2)
23	27 October	Prva HNL	13	A	Zadar	2–1	5,000	Šokota (2)
24	31 October	Prva HNL	14	H	Inter Zaprešić	5–0	2,500	Pokrivač, Mandžukić, Sammir, Guela, Šokota
25	3 November	Prva HNL	15	A	Cibalia	2–1	5,000	Vukojević, Guela
26	8 November	UEFA Cup	Group stage	H	FC Basel (Switzerland)	0–0		
27	11 November	Prva HNL	16	H	Osijek	1–0	5,000	Vukojević
28	24 November	Prva HNL	17	A	Međimurje	1–1	5,000	Vugrinec
29	29 November	UEFA Cup	Group stage	A (Norway)	Brann (Norway)	1–2		Vukojević
30	2 December	Prva HNL	18	H	NK Zagreb	6–3	5,000	Balaban, Tadić (2), Modrić, Mandžukić, Vrdoljak
31	5 December	UEFA Cup	Group stage	H	Hamburger SV (Germany)	0–2		
32	8 December	Prva HNL	19	A	Slaven Belupo	2–5		Buljat, Carlos
33	20 December	UEFA Cup	Group stage	A (France)	Rennes (France)	1–1		Vukojević
34	23 February	Prva HNL	20	H	Varteks	1–2	6,000	Tadić
35	27 February	Croatian Cup	Quarterfinal	A	Slaven Belupo	1–0		Bišćan
36	1 March	Prva HNL	21	A	Rijeka	4–2		
37	8 March	Prva HNL	22	H	Hajduk Split	1–0		
38	12 March	Croatian Cup	Quarterfinal	H	Slaven Belupo	2–1		Modrić, Tadić
39	15 March	Prva HNL	23	H	Cibalia	4–0	3,500	Balaban (2), Čale, Tadić
40	19 March	Prva HNL	24	A	NK Zagreb	0–0	2,000	
41	22 March	Prva HNL	25	H	Šibenik	5–1	300	Modrić (2), Tadić, Drpić, Balaban
42	29 March	Prva HNL	26	A	Varteks	1–1	6,000	Balaban
43	9 April	Croatian Cup	Semifinal	H	NK Zagreb	3–1	1,500	Mandžukić, Tadić, Vugrinec
44	12 April	Prva HNL	28	A	Međimurje	2–1	500	Sammir, Vugrinec
45	16 April	Prva HNL	29	H	Osijek	2–1	1,200	Tadić, Mandžukić, Vukojević
46	19 April	Prva HNL	30	A	Zadar	5–2	4,500	Tadić (2), Vugrinec (2), Buljat
47	23 April	Croatian Cup	Semifinal	A	NK Zagreb	3–2		Mikulić (o.g.), Ivanković (o.g.), Mikić
48	26 April	Prva HNL	31	H	Slaven Belupo	1–0	2,000	Balaban
49	30 April	Prva HNL	27*	H	Inter Zaprešić	1–0	1,500	Mandžukić
50	3 May	Prva HNL	32	A	Hajduk Split	1–1	10,000	Etto
51	7 May	Croatian Cup	Final	H	Hajduk Split	3–0	15,000	Mandžukić (2), Tadić
52	10 May	Prva HNL	33	H	Rijeka	6–1		Tadić (3), Vukojević (2), Mandžukić
53	14 May	Croatian Cup	Final	A	Hajduk Split	0–0		

== Goalscorers ==
Rank	Player	League	Cup	Europe	Total
1	(Croatia) Mario Mandžukić	12	5	3	20
2	(Croatia) Luka Modrić	13	1	3	17
3	(Croatia) Josip Tadić	11	3	1	15
3	(Croatia) Ognjen Vukojević	11	–	4	15
5	(Croatia) Boško Balaban	11	2	1	14
6	(Croatia) Tomo Šokota	5	2	2	9
7	(Croatia) Davor Vugrinec	4	1	1	6
8	(Brazil) Sammir	4	–	1	5
9	(Croatia) Nikola Pokrivač	4	–	–	4
10	(Croatia) Ivica Vrdoljak	3	–	–	3
11	(Croatia) Marijan Buljat	2	–	–	2
11	(Ivory Coast) Did'dy Guela	2	–	–	2
11	(Brazil) Etto	1	–	1	2
11	(Croatia) Mihael Mikić	1	1	–	2
15	(Croatia) Igor Bišćan	–	1	–	1
15	(Brazil) Carlos	1	–	–	1
15	(Croatia) Hrvoje Čale	1	–	–	1
15	(Croatia) Dino Drpić	1	–	–	1
15	(Croatia) Dario Jertec	1	–	–	1
15	(Croatia) Gordon Schildenfeld	1	–	–	1
