= 2008 Croatian Football Cup final =

- Event: 2007–08 Croatian Cup
Dinamo Zagreb	Hajduk Split
3	0

First leg
Dinamo Zagreb	Hajduk Split
3	0
- Date: 7 May 2008
- Venue: Stadion Maksimir, Zagreb
- Man of the Match: Mario Mandžukić (Dinamo Zagreb)
- Referee: Domagoj Ljubičić (Osijek)
- Attendance: 15,000
- Weather: Clear

Second leg
Hajduk Split	Dinamo Zagreb
0	0
- Date: 14 May 2008
- Venue: Stadion Poljud, Split
- Man of the Match: Luka Modrić (Dinamo Zagreb)
- Referee: Ivan Bebek (Rijeka)
- Attendance: 6,000
- Weather: Clear

The 2008 Croatian Cup final was a two-legged affair played between Hajduk Split and Dinamo Zagreb. The first leg was played in Zagreb on 7 May 2008, while the second leg on 14 May 2008 in Split.

Dinamo Zagreb won the trophy with an aggregate result of 3–0.

== Road to the final ==
Dinamo Zagreb		Round	Hajduk Split	
Opponent	Result		Opponent	Result
Virovitica	3–1 (aet)	First round	Mladost Molve	9–1
Šibenik	3–2	Second round	Croatia Sesvete	2–0
Slaven Belupo	1–0	Quarter-finals	Inter Zaprešić	2–1
Slaven Belupo	1–0	Quarter-finals	Inter Zaprešić	4–0
NK Zagreb	3–1	Semi-finals	Varteks	1–1
NK Zagreb	3–2	Semi-finals	Varteks	4–0

== First leg ==
7 May 2008
17:30 CET

Dinamo Zagreb	3–0	Hajduk Split
Tadić 8'; Mandžukić 20', 88'	Report (in Croatian)

Stadion Maksimir, Zagreb
Attendance: 15,000
Referee: Domagoj Ljubičić (Osijek)

DINAMO ZAGREB:
GK	1	(Germany) Georg Koch
DF	3	(Croatia) Hrvoje Čale
DF	5	(Croatia) Tomislav Mikulić
DF	21	(Croatia) Ivica Vrdoljak
DF	26	(Croatia) Dino Drpić
MF	7	(Brazil) Etto
MF	10	(Croatia) Luka Modrić (c)
MF	14	(Croatia) Mihael Mikić
MF	20	(Croatia) Ognjen Vukojević
FW	11	(Croatia) Josip Tadić	(substituted off) 83'
FW	17	(Croatia) Mario Mandžukić
Substitutes:
FW	25	(Croatia) Tomo Šokota	(substituted on) 83'
Manager:
(Croatia) Zvonimir Soldo

HAJDUK SPLIT:
GK	12	(Croatia) Vladimir Balić
DF	3	(Croatia) Goran Jozinović		(substituted off) 86'
DF	6	(Croatia) Boris Živković
DF	20	(Croatia) Goran Sablić (c)	(yellow card) 23'	(substituted off) 46'
DF	22	(Croatia) Mario Maloča
MF	8	(Croatia) Siniša Linić
MF	14	(Croatia) Marin Ljubičić	(yellow card) 64'
MF	15	(Croatia) Drago Gabrić
MF	21	(Croatia) Duje Čop
FW	9	(Croatia) Nikola Kalinić	(yellow card) 77'
FW	13	(Croatia) Ante Rukavina
Substitutes:
DF	5	(Croatia) Jurica Buljat		(substituted on) 46'
FW	16	(Bosnia and Herzegovina) Mladen Bartolović		(substituted on) 86'
Manager:
(Croatia) Robert Jarni

Assistant referees:
Dalibor Conjar (Osijek)
Ivan Keškić (Vinkovci)

Match rules

- 90 minutes.
- Seven named substitutes.
- Maximum of three substitutions.

== Second leg ==
14 May 2008
17:30 CET

Hajduk Split	0–0	Dinamo Zagreb
	Report (in Croatian)

Stadion Poljud, Split
Attendance: 6,000
Referee: Ivan Bebek (Rijeka)

HAJDUK SPLIT:
GK	12	(Croatia) Vladimir Balić	(red card) 19'
DF	6	(Croatia) Boris Živković
DF	22	(Croatia) Mario Maloča	(yellow card) 45'
DF	28	(Bosnia and Herzegovina) Boris Pandža
MF	8	(Croatia) Siniša Linić
MF	10	(Romania) Florin Cernat		(substituted off) 45'
MF	14	(Croatia) Marin Ljubičić	(yellow card) 24'
MF	15	(Croatia) Drago Gabrić
FW	9	(Croatia) Nikola Kalinić (c)		(substituted off) 21'
FW	13	(Croatia) Ante Rukavina
FW	16	(Bosnia and Herzegovina) Mladen Bartolović		(substituted off) 63'
Substitutes:
GK	1	(Croatia) Miro Varvodić		(substituted on) 21'
MF	18	(Croatia) Ivan Ćurjurić		(substituted on) 45'
MF	24	(Croatia) Mario Tičinović		(substituted on) 63'
Manager:
(Croatia) Robert Jarni

DINAMO ZAGREB:
GK	1	(Germany) Georg Koch
DF	3	(Croatia) Hrvoje Čale	(red card) 19'
DF	5	(Croatia) Tomislav Mikulić
DF	21	(Croatia) Ivica Vrdoljak
DF	22	(Croatia) Igor Bišćan
MF	7	(Brazil) Etto
MF	10	(Croatia) Luka Modrić (c)		(substituted off) 89'
MF	14	(Croatia) Mihael Mikić	(yellow card) 19'	(substituted off) 46'
MF	20	(Croatia) Ognjen Vukojević
FW	11	(Croatia) Josip Tadić		(substituted off) 82'
FW	17	(Croatia) Mario Mandžukić	(yellow card) 45' (yellow-red card) 69'
Substitutes:
MF	2	(Croatia) Marijan Buljat	(yellow card) 67'	(substituted on) 46'
FW	9	(Croatia) Boško Balaban		(substituted on) 82'
MF	18	(Brazil) Sammir		(substituted on) 89'
Manager:
(Croatia) Zvonimir Soldo

Assistant referees:
Željko Perak (Karlovac)
Damir Pervan (Bjelovar)

Match rules

- 90 minutes.
- Penalty shoot-out if scores still level; no extra time.
- Seven named substitutes.
- Maximum of three substitutions.
