= Tomislav Bašić =

Tomislav Bašić may refer to:

- Tomislav Bašić (footballer) (born 1980), Bosnian-Herzegovinian footballer
- Tomislav Bašić (sailor) (born 1975), Croatian sailor
