= Karlo Šimek =

Croatian footballer

Personal information
- Date of birth: 3 June 1988 (age 38)
- Place of birth: Varaždin, Croatia
- Height: 1.68 m (5 ft 6 in)
- Positions: Right midfielder; right-back

Youth career
- Varteks

Senior career*
Years	Team	Apps	(Gls)
2007–2012	Varteks / Varaždin	103	(1)
2012	Karlovac	4	(0)
2012–2013	Zelina	36	(0)
2013–2014	SV Lafnitz	26	(1)
2015	Gorica	11	(0)
2015	FC Deutschkreutz	7	(0)
2016–2017	Međimurje		
2017–2018	Varaždin	27	(0)

International career
2003	Croatia U16	2	(0)
2008–2009	Croatia U20	3	(0)
2008–2009	Croatia U21	7	(0)
- * Club domestic league appearances and goals

Karlo Šimek (born 3 June 1988) is a Croatian former professional footballer who played as a right midfielder or right-back.

== Club career ==
A graduate of the Varteks youth academy, Šimek was promoted to the senior squad in 2007, which changed its name to NK Varaždin in mid-2010. In January 2012, he had a try-out with Kazakh club Shakhter Karagandy in Turkey, but in the process, he injured his leg. In the same month, Istra 1961 also expressed their desire to sign him. He ultimately signed for Karlovac after having made 103 appearances for Varteks / Varaždin.

After a stint with Croatian club Zelina, Šimek moved abroad, signing for Austrian club Lafnitz. He went on to represent Gorica and Deutschkreutz, before signing for Međimurje in January 2016. In January 2017, he signed with a different NK Varaždin, a club unassociated with the one he started his career with, but which went bankrupt in 2015.

== Career statistics ==
=== Club ===
Appearances and goals by club, season and competition
Club	Season	League			Cup		Continental		Total	
Club	Season	Division	Apps	Goals	Apps	Goals	Apps	Goals	Apps	Goals
Varteks / Varaždin	2009–10	Prva HNL	16	0	2	0	—		18	0
Varteks / Varaždin	2008–09	Prva HNL	23	0	1	0	—		24	0
Varteks / Varaždin	2009–10	Prva HNL	23	1	6	1	—		29	2
Varteks / Varaždin	2010–11	Prva HNL	26	0	7	0	—		33	0
Varteks / Varaždin	2011–12	Prva HNL	15	0	2	0	6 (Note: Appearances in UEFA Europa League)	0	23	0
Varteks / Varaždin	Total		103	1	18	1	6	0	127	2
Karlovac	2011–12	Prva HNL	4	0	0	0	—		4	0
Zelina	2012–13	Druga HNL	22	0	4	0	—		26	0
Zelina	2013–14	Druga HNL	14	0	2	0	—		16	0
Zelina	Total		36	0	6	0	—		42	0
SV Lafnitz	2013–14	Austrian Regionalliga	11	1	0	0	—		11	1
SV Lafnitz	2014–15	Austrian Regionalliga	15	0	2	0	—		17	0
SV Lafnitz	Total		26	1	2	0	—		28	1
Gorica	2014–15	Druga HNL	11	0	0	0	—		11	0
Varaždin (2012)	2017–18	Druga HNL	27	0	1	0	—		28	0
Career total			207	2	27	1	6	0	240	3
