= Hrvoje Čale =

Croatian footballer (born 1985)

Personal information
- Date of birth: 4 March 1985 (age 41)
- Place of birth: Zagreb, SR Croatia, Yugoslavia
- Height: 1.84 m (6 ft 0 in)
- Position: Left-back

Youth career
- 1994–2003: Dinamo Zagreb

Senior career*
Years	Team	Apps	(Gls)
2003–2008	Dinamo Zagreb	83	(4)
2004–2005	→ Inter Zaprešić (loan)	13	(0)
2008–2011	Trabzonspor	79	(1)
2011–2013	VfL Wolfsburg	1	(0)
2013–2015	Waasland-Beveren	47	(0)
2015–2016	Olimpija Ljubljana	13	(0)
2017	Inter Zaprešić	7	(0)

International career
2000–2006	Croatia U21	14	(0)
2009–2010	Croatia	5	(0)
- * Club domestic league appearances and goals

Hrvoje Čale (born 4 March 1985) is a Croatian former professional footballer who played as a left-back.

== Club career ==
Čale began his career at age nine in the youth ranks of Dinamo Zagreb. He made his break into the first team in 2003. However, he was mostly used as a substitute when starters were injured. After his loan to Inter Zaprešić in 2004–05, Čale became a starter for Dinamo, where he played until the end of the 2007–08 season.

In May 2008, Čale was transferred to Trabzonspor for a fee of €2.5 million. He signed a four-year contract. Before the move, Čale called Davor Vugrinec and asked him about his experience with the club. Vugrinec talked very positively about the club, which Čale said contributed to his decision. He became Trabzonspor's 68th foreigner, and the second Croatian, after Davor Vugrinec.

In his first season with Trabzonspor, Čale participated in 36 total matches and cemented his place as the starting left-back. Čale was the starting left-back for the Turkish Cup winning side in 2010, and also started in the 2010 Turkish Super Cup final against league champions Bursaspor. Čale received a yellow card in a three nil victory for the Black Sea-based Trabzonspor.

On 19 July 2011, Čale's contract with Trabzonspor was terminated by mutual consent.

Čale moved to Bundesliga side VfL Wolfsburg but failed to become regular first team member. After almost two seasons of struggling, Čale finally left Wolfsburg in May 2013 and signed for Belgian club Waasland-Beveren.

After two seasons for Waasland-Beveren, he left Belgium and signed for Olimpija Ljubljana. He left Ljubljana after only one season in summer of 2016. On 15 February 2017, after being free agent for more than half season he signed with Inter Zaprešić for the rest of the season.

== International career ==
Čale represented Croatia at youth level. He made his senior international debut in a friendly victory against Romania on 11 February 2009 and earned a total of 5 caps, scoring no goals. His final international was a May 2010 friendly away against Estonia.

== Honours ==
Dinamo Zagreb

- Prva HNL: 2005–06, 2006–07, 2007–08
- Croatian Cup: 2004, 2007, 2008
- Croatian Super Cup: 2006

Trabzonspor

- Turkish Cup: 2009–10
- Turkish Super Cup: 2010

Olimpija

- PrvaLiga: 2015–16
