= Davor Vugrinec =

Croatian footballer (born 1975)

Personal information
- Date of birth: 24 March 1975 (age 51)
- Place of birth: Varaždin, SR Croatia, SFR Yugoslavia
- Height: 1.79 m (5 ft 10 in)
- Position: Striker

Senior career*
Years	Team	Apps	(Gls)
1992–1997	Varteks	123	(56)
1997–2000	Trabzonspor	85	(29)
2000–2002	Lecce	71	(19)
2003–2004	Atalanta	30	(0)
2004–2005	Catania	20	(2)
2005–2006	Rijeka	24	(15)
2006–2008	Dinamo Zagreb	34	(16)
2008–2010	NK Zagreb	55	(33)
2010–2012	Varaždin	40	(8)
2012–2015	Slaven Belupo	64	(22)
Total		546	(196)

International career
1995	Croatia U20	1	(0)
1994–1997	Croatia U21	19	(3)
1999	Croatia B	1	(0)
1996–2006	Croatia	28	(7)
- * Club domestic league appearances and goals

Davor Vugrinec (born 24 March 1975) is a Croatian former professional footballer. He primarily played as a striker, but also operated as an attacking midfielder or a second striker. He is all-time top scorer of the Croatian First Football League with 146 goals he has scored for five different clubs and also the oldest player to score a goal in the league, netting for Slaven Belupo 10 days before his 40th birthday.

Vugrinec is currently the vice-president of NK Varaždin, a different organization from the defunct (as of 2015) Varteks / Varaždin club he was with during his playing career.

== Club career ==
=== Early years ===
Vugrinec started his professional career at local club NK Varteks in 1992, becoming a regular at the club from his second professional season onwards, and scoring in double digits in three of the following four campaigns. In 1995–96, he netted 17 goals in 31 games as the team finished in fourth position (third after the second stage), also appearing in the season's Croatian Cup final.

=== Turkey and Italy ===
In June 1997, Vugrinec moved abroad, joining Trabzonspor in Turkey, scoring 24 Süper Lig goals in his first two seasons combined. In the 2000 summer, he moved teams and countries again, signing with U.S. Lecce in Italy, his 11 successful strikes proving crucial as the Apulia outfit narrowly avoided relegation from Serie A; on 12 November 2000, he netted the game's only goal at the San Siro, in an historic win against F.C. Internazionale Milano.

2002–03 saw Lecce in Serie B, but Vugrinec returned to the top level in January 2003, joining Atalanta BC. The last of his five seasons in the country was spent in division two, with Calcio Catania (less than half of the league games, no promotion).

=== Return home ===
Subsequently, Vugrinec returned to Croatia and signed with NK Rijeka. Together with Ahmad Sharbini, he was the club's top goalscorer in 2005–06's top division (15 goals apiece), and also helped the team win the domestic cup by scoring the crucial goal in the second-leg match against former club Varteks (Rijeka lost 1–5 away after winning 4–0 in the first leg – with two goals from him – thus overcoming on away goals).

Vugrinec joined NK Dinamo Zagreb in early June 2006 and made his official debut for the club on 19 July, in the Croatian Supercup against his previous club Rijeka, assisting for two goals in a 4–1 win. He went on to score his first goals for Dinamo in the UEFA Champions League qualifier against FK Ekranas and the team's first domestic league match of the 2006–07 season, against NK Slaven Belupo. He suffered an injury in a home fixture against HNK Šibenik on 4 August, but managed to recover for the club's first-leg third-round Champions League clash against Arsenal four days later, only to be stretchered off 30 minutes into the game, missing the second match.

Vugrinec joined neighbouring NK Zagreb for the 2008–09 season, returning to Varteks, renamed NK Varaždin, two years later, at the age of 35. In March 2012, he terminated his contract with the team, ranking second best all-time goalscorer in the Croatian top division with a total of 124 goals scored. During the same month, Vugrinec joined Slaven Belupo and scored in his debut against Osijek.

== International career ==
Vugrinec made his debut for Croatia on 10 April 1996, in a friendly match with Hungary played in Osijek, but had to wait two 1/2 years to win his second international cap, in the nation's second UEFA Euro 2000 qualifier away against Malta, on 10 October 1998; he entered the match as an early substitute after injury forced off Jurica Vučko in the 16th minute and went on to score two goals in the second half, as the national team came from behind to win it 4–1.

In 2000, Vugrinec became a regular in the main squad, and went on to appear in seven out of possible eight qualifying matches for the 2002 FIFA World Cup. He scored two goals during the campaign, as he was on target against Latvia and San Marino respectively (both home fixtures), and was subsequently part of the final stages' squad, appearing in two games in an eventual group stage exit: he started the second match against Italy, but was replaced in the 57th minute, and also played in the final one against Ecuador as an early second-half substitute.

After the tournament in Japan and South Korea, Vugrinec only appeared in one friendly match and two Euro 2004 qualifiers before being uncapped for more than three years, until January 2006. He made his international comeback by appearing in two matches at the Carlsberg Cup in Hong Kong, thus applying for a spot in the final squad of 23 at the 2006 World Cup, especially after scoring a hat-trick in Rijeka's 4–0 league win at HNK Hajduk Split, but was eventually omitted. He earned a total of 28 caps, scoring 7 goals.

== Personal life ==
An art collector, he owns the Kolekcije Vugrinec in his gallery in Zagreb. He is married to curator and museum advisor Petra and they have one daughter together, while he also has three kids from his first marriage to Nina. Among them, his son Noa signed professional terms with NK Varaždin in 2021.

== Career statistics ==
=== Club ===
Appearances and goals by club, season and competition
Club	Season	League			National cup (Note: Includes Croatian Cup, Turkish Cup, Coppa Italia.)		Europe		Other		Total	
Club	Season	Division	Apps	Goals	Apps	Goals	Apps	Goals	Apps	Goals	Apps	Goals
Varteks	1992–93	Prva HNL	5	1	1	0	–		–		6	1
Varteks	1993–94	Prva HNL	33	17	5	5	–		–		38	22
Varteks	1994–95	Prva HNL	27	8	6	2	–		–		33	10
Varteks	1995–96	Prva HNL	31	17	9	7	–		–		40	24
Varteks	1996–97	Prva HNL	27	13	4	4	4	2	–		35	19
Varteks	Total		123	56	25	18	4	2	0	0	152	76
Trabzonspor	1997–98	1.Lig	30	12	2	3	2	1	–		34	16
Trabzonspor	1998–99	1.Lig	28	12	3	2	–		–		31	14
Trabzonspor	1999–2000	1.Lig	27	5	3	2	2	0	–		32	7
Trabzonspor	Total		85	29	8	7	0	0	4	1	97	37
Lecce	2000–01	Serie A	34	11	4	3	–		–		38	14
Lecce	2001–02	Serie A	29	7	0	0	–		–		29	7
Lecce	2002–03	Serie B	8	1	2	0	–		–		10	1
Lecce	Total		61	19	6	3	0	0	0	0	67	22
Atalanta	2002–03	Serie A	15	0	–		–		–		15	0
Atalanta	2003–04	Serie B	15	0	–		–		–		15	0
Atalanta	Total		30	0	0	0	0	0	0	0	30	0
Catania	2004–05	Serie B	20	2	3	1	–		–		23	3
HNK Rijeka	2005–06	Prva HNL	24	15	6	4	0	0	–		30	19
Dinamo Zagreb	2006–07	Prva HNL	21	12	5	2	5	2	1 (Note: Appearance in Croatian Football Super Cup)	0	32	16
Dinamo Zagreb	2007–08	Prva HNL	13	4	4	1	3	1	–		20	6
Dinamo Zagreb	Total		34	16	9	3	8	3	1	0	52	22
NK Zagreb	2008–09	Prva HNL	29	11	3	2	–		–		32	13
NK Zagreb	2009–10	Prva HNL	26	18	4	1	–		–		30	19
NK Zagreb	Total		55	29	7	3	0	0	0	0	62	32
NK Varaždin	2010–11	Prva HNL	24	6	2	2	–		–		26	8
NK Varaždin	2011–12	Prva HNL	16	2	1	0	5	4	–		22	6
NK Varaždin	Total		40	8	3	2	5	4	0	0	48	14
Slaven Belupo	2011–12	Prva HNL	7	4	–		–		–		7	4
Slaven Belupo	2012–13	Prva HNL	19	8	2	2	2	0	–		23	10
Slaven Belupo	2013–14	Prva HNL	21	8	4	1	–		–		25	9
Slaven Belupo	2014–15	Prva HNL	17	2	1	0	–		–		18	2
Slaven Belupo	Total		64	22	7	3	2	0	0	0	73	25
Career total			546	196	76	44	1	0	23	10	646	250

=== International ===
Appearances and goals by national team and year
National team	Year	Apps	Goals
Croatia	1996	1	0
Croatia	1997	0	0
Croatia	1998	1	2
Croatia	1999	4	1
Croatia	2000	3	0
Croatia	2001	8	4
Croatia	2002	9	0
Croatia	2003	0	0
Croatia	2004	0	0
Croatia	2005	0	0
Croatia	2006	2	0
Total		28	7

Scores and results list Croatia's goal tally first, score column indicates score after each Vugrinec goal.

List of international goals scored by Davor Vugrinec
No.	Date	Venue	Opponent	Score	Result	Competition
1	10 October 1998	Ta' Qali, Ta' Qali, Malta	Malta	2–1	4–1	UEFA Euro 2000 qualifying
2	10 October 1998	Ta' Qali, Ta' Qali, Malta	Malta	3–1	4–1	UEFA Euro 2000 qualifying
3	13 June 1999	Dongdaemun, Seoul, South Korea	Egypt	2–2	2–2	Friendly
4	28 February 2001	Kantrida, Rijeka, Croatia	Austria	1–0	1–0	Friendly
5	24 March 2001	Gradski vrt, Osijek, Croatia	Latvia	4–1	4–1	2002 FIFA World Cup qualification
6	2 June 2001	Stadion Varteks, Varaždin, Croatia	San Marino	4–0	4–0	2002 FIFA World Cup qualification
7	15 August 2001	Lansdowne Road, Dublin, Ireland	Republic of Ireland	1–2	2–2	Friendly

== Honours ==
Varteks / Varaždin

- Croatian Football Cup runner-up: 1995–96, 2010–11

Rijeka

- Croatian Football Cup: 2005–06

Dinamo Zagreb

- Prva HNL: 2006–07, 2007–08
- Croatian Football Cup: 2006–07, 2007–08
- Super Cup: 2006

Individual

- Prva HNL Top Scorer: 2009–10
- Prva HNL All-Time Top Scorer: 146 goals
- Croatian Football Cup All-Time Top Scorer: 34 goals
- Most hat-tricks in Prva HNL
