= Etto =

Brazilian footballer (born 1981)

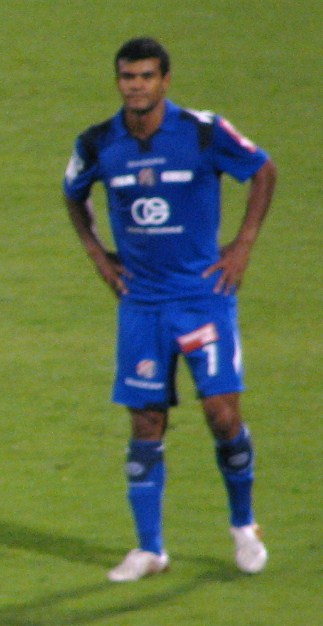

Personal information
- Full name: Oélilton Araújo dos Santos
- Date of birth: 8 March 1981 (age 45)
- Place of birth: Valente, Bahia, Brazil
- Height: 1.76 m (5 ft 9 1/2 in)
- Positions: Right full-back; right winger

Team information
- Current team: Jadran Štefanec

Senior career*
Years	Team	Apps	(Gls)
2002	Bahia	3	(0)
2003	Criciúma	19	(0)
2004	Paraná	17	(1)
2005	Atlético Paranaense	6	(0)
2005–2011	Dinamo Zagreb	107	(8)
2011–2013	PAOK	52	(0)
2013–2014	Baku	27	(0)
2023–	Jadran Štefanec	0	(0)
Total		231	(9)
- * Club domestic league appearances and goals

Oélilton Araújo dos Santos (Brazilian Portuguese: [ɐɾɐˈuʒu]; born 8 March 1981), commonly known by his nickname Etto, is a Brazilian former professional footballer. As of 1 September 2007, Etto also holds Croatian citizenship beside Brazilian, and had expressed his desire to play for Croatia at the international level.

== Career ==
=== Career in Brazil ===
His professional career in Brazil started in 2002 and consisted of one-season stints with Bahia, Criciúma, Paraná and Atlético Paranaense, whence he moved to Dinamo Zagreb for the 2005–06 Prva HNL season.

=== Dinamo Zagreb ===
Etto arrived to his new club in August 2005. In his debut season with the Croatian club Etto featured in 24 league matches and scored 5 goals in what would end up being the title winning campaign for Dinamo Zagreb. The following season Etto made inconsisted appearances and featured in only 13 league matches for the club. He also made his debut in European competitions, making a total of four appearances throughout the season. He won his first double with the club as Dinamo Zagreb were both league champions and cup winners for the 2006–07 season. Etto also played in the 2006 Croatian Supercup which Dinamo Zagreb won 4–1 against Rijeka.

The 2007–08 was most successful for Etto since his arrival as he made a total of 40 appearances for the club and scored one goal. He also repeated the success with the club from the last season, again winning the double. The 2008–09 Prva HNL season saw Etto feature in only 16 out of 33 league matches for the club, making a total of 28 appearances in all competitions. The club won its third consecutive double since Etto's arrival.

He featured in 21 out of the 30 matches of the 2009–10 Prva HNL and made 10 appearances in UEFA competitions, also making four appearances in the 2009–10 Croatian Cup which made a total of 35 appearances.

=== PAOK ===
On 28 January 2011, Etto signed a two-and-a-half-year contract with Greek Super League side PAOK.

=== Baku ===
On 5 August 2013, Etto signed a one-year contract with Azerbaijan Premier League side Baku.

=== Career statistics ===
As of 20 April 2014

- Note: the Croatian Cup appearances for Dinamo Zagreb can be viewed at the official website of the club nk-dinamo.hr under The Match section.

Club performance			League		Cup		Continental		Total	
Season	Club	League	Apps	Goals	Apps	Goals	Apps	Goals	Apps	Goals
Brazil			League		Copa do Brasil		South America		Total	
2002	Bahia	Brasileirão	3	0					3	0
2003	Criciúma	Brasileirão	19	0					19	0
2004	Paraná	Brasileirão	17	1					17	1
2005	Atlético Paranaense	Brasileirão	6	0					6	0
2005–06	Dinamo Zagreb	Prva HNL	24	5	0	0	0	0	24	5
2006–07	Dinamo Zagreb	Prva HNL	13	1	3^{1}	0	4	0	20^{1}	2
2007–08	Dinamo Zagreb	Prva HNL	23	1	7	0	10	0	40	1
2008–09	Dinamo Zagreb	Prva HNL	16	1	4	0	8	0	28	1
2009–10	Dinamo Zagreb	Prva HNL	21	0	4	0	10	0	35	0
2010–11	Dinamo Zagreb	Prva HNL	10	0	5^{2}	0	9	1	24^{2}	1
2010–11	PAOK	Super League Greece	14	0	0	0	0	0	14	0
2011–12	PAOK	Super League Greece	21	0	3	0	9	0	33	0
2012–13	PAOK	Super League Greece	17	0	0	0	4	0	7	0
2013–14	Baku	Azerbaijan Premier League	27	0	3	0	0	0	30	0
Career total			217	9	30	0	54	1	300	11

^{1} Including the 2006 Croatian Supercup match against Rijeka.
^{2} Including the 2010 Croatian Supercup match against Hajduk Split.

== Honours ==
As of 1 August 2010

Dinamo Zagreb

- Prva HNL: 2006, 2007, 2008, 2009, 2010
- Croatian Cup: 2007, 2008, 2009
- Croatian Supercup: 2006, 2010
