= Mario Maloča =

Croatian footballer

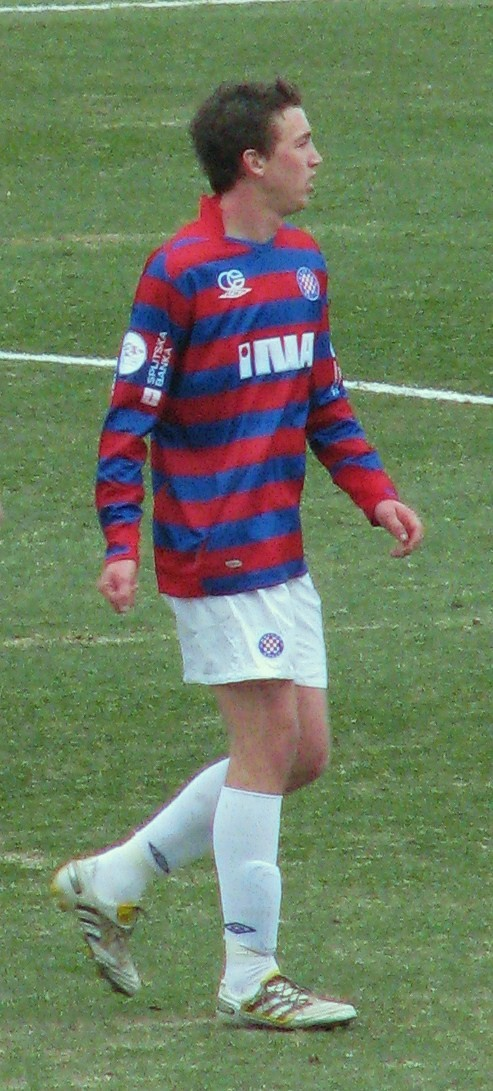
- Maloča playing for Hajduk Split in 2010

Personal information
- Date of birth: 4 May 1989 (age 37)
- Place of birth: Zagreb, SR Croatia, Yugoslavia
- Height: 1.90 m (6 ft 3 in)
- Position: Centre-back

Team information
- Current team: Jarun
- Number: 22

Youth career
- 1998–2004: Dinamo Zagreb
- 2004–2005: NK Zagreb
- 2006: Inter Zaprešić
- 2006: Kamen Ingrad
- 2007–2008: Hajduk Split

Senior career*
Years	Team	Apps	(Gls)
2008–2015	Hajduk Split	170	(4)
2015–2018	Lechia Gdańsk	60	(4)
2017–2018	→ Greuther Fürth (loan)	31	(2)
2018–2019	Greuther Fürth	24	(0)
2019–2023	Lechia Gdańsk	100	(2)
2023–2025	Gorica	53	(0)
2025–	Jarun	30	(0)

International career
2008	Croatia U19	3	(1)
2008–2009	Croatia U20	6	(0)
2008–2010	Croatia U21	13	(0)
2012	Croatia	1	(0)
- * Club domestic league appearances and goals as of 17 June 2026

Mario Maloča (born 4 May 1989) is a Croatian professional footballer who plays as a centre-back for First Football League club Jarun.

== Club career ==
Maloča spent most of his youth career at Dinamo Zagreb and had spells with youth teams at NK Zagreb, Inter Zaprešić and Kamen Ingrad. In 2007, Maloča signed for Hajduk Split.

He made his Prva HNL debut with Hajduk at the age of 18 against Šibenik in the 2007–08 season and soon became a first team regular, playing alongside renowned defenders such as Igor Tudor, Goran Sablić and Boris Živković. After the season ended he signed a five-year contract with Hajduk, binding him to Poljud until 2013. In April 2015, he was dropped to B team for a short time, and in July 2015 he left Hajduk.

In July 2017, Maloča joined 2. Bundesliga side SpVgg Greuther Fürth on loan for the 2017–18 season.

In May 2019, it was confirmed that he had rejoined Lechia Gdańsk on a three-year contract.

== International career ==
Maloča also earned 13 caps for Croatia's U-19 and U-21 teams and took part in Croatia's 2008 Under-19 European Championship campaign where he scored a goal against Albania. In August 2012, he was called to the Croatia national football team by Croatian manager Igor Štimac. He debuted in a friendly match against Switzerland, where he started and was substituted by Ante Vukušić at the start of the second half.

== Career statistics ==
As of match played 28 April 2024

Appearances and goals by club, season and competition
Club	Season	League			National cup (Note: Includes Croatian Cup, Polish Cup, DFB-Pokal)		Europe		Other		Total	
Club	Season	Division	Apps	Goals	Apps	Goals	Apps	Goals	Apps	Goals	Apps	Goals
Hajduk Split	2007–08	Prva HNL	12	0	4	1	—		—		16	1
Hajduk Split	2008–09	Prva HNL	16	0	5	1	3 (Note: Appearances in UEFA Europa League)	0	—		24	1
Hajduk Split	2009–10	Prva HNL	20	0	6	0	2	0	—		28	0
Hajduk Split	2010–11	Prva HNL	27	0	1	0	9	0	1 (Note: Appearance in Croatian Football Super Cup)	0	38	0
Hajduk Split	2011–12	Prva HNL	14	1	3	0	2	0	—		19	1
Hajduk Split	2012–13	Prva HNL	23	1	6	0	4	0	—		33	1
Hajduk Split	2013–14	Prva HNL	30	1	2	0	4	1	—		36	2
Hajduk Split	2014–15	Prva HNL	28	1	5	1	6	0	—		39	2
Hajduk Split	Total		170	4	32	3	30	1	1	0	233	8
Lechia Gdańsk	2015–16	Ekstraklasa	28	2	0	0	—		—		28	2
Lechia Gdańsk	2016–17	Ekstraklasa	31	2	1	0	—		—		32	2
Lechia Gdańsk	2017–18	Ekstraklasa	1	0	0	0	—		—		1	0
Lechia Gdańsk	Total		60	4	1	0	0	0	0	0	61	4
Greuther Fürth	2017–18	2. Bundesliga	31	2	1	0	—		—		32	2
Greuther Fürth	2018–19	2. Bundesliga	24	0	1	0	—		—		25	0
Greuther Fürth	Total		55	2	2	0	0	0	0	0	57	2
Lechia Gdańsk	2019–20	Ekstraklasa	27	0	4	0	0	0	1 (Note: Appearance in Polish Super Cup)	0	32	0
Lechia Gdańsk	2020–21	Ekstraklasa	15	1	0	0	—		—		15	1
Lechia Gdańsk	2021–22	Ekstraklasa	31	0	2	0	—		—		33	0
Lechia Gdańsk	2022–23	Ekstraklasa	27	1	2	0	4 (Note: Appearances in UEFA Europa Conference League)	0	0	0	37	1
Lechia Gdańsk	Total		100	2	8	0	4	0	1	0	117	2
Gorica	2023–24	Prva HNL	30	0	2	0	—		—		32	0
Gorica	Total		30	0	2	0	0	0	0	0	32	0
Career total			415	12	45	3	34	1	2	0	496	16

== Personal life ==
Despite being born in Zagreb and part of Dinamo Zagreb youth team in his early years, Maloča opted to play for Hajduk Split. Maloča married his childhood sweetheart Ivana in June 2012. The couple had their first child, Tea, on 21 March 2013.

== Honours ==
Hajduk Split

- Croatian Cup: 2009–10, 2012–13

Lechia Gdańsk

- Polish Super Cup: 2019
