= Ronald Šiklić =

Croatian footballer

Personal information
- Date of birth: 24 November 1980 (age 45)
- Place of birth: Zagreb, SFR Yugoslavia
- Height: 1.79 m (5 ft 10 in)
- Position: Defender

Senior career*
Years	Team	Apps	(Gls)
–2000	Dinamo Zagreb	0	(0)
2000–2003	Šibenik	21	(0)
2001	→ Inker Zaprešić (loan)	9	(0)
2003	Odra Wodzisław	3	(0)
2004	Dyskobolia	3	(0)
2004–2006	Górnik Łęczna	21	(0)
2006	Lechia Gdańsk	4	(0)
2006–2007	Kryvbas Kryvyi Rih	6	(0)
2007–2008	Slaven Belupo	22	(1)
2008–2010	Slavia Prague	5	(0)
2009	→ České Budějovice (loan)	1	(0)
2010	→ Hlučín (loan)	6	(0)
2013	Lučko		
2017	USV Waisenegg		
2019	SC Rattersdorf/Liebing		
- * Club domestic league appearances and goals

Ronald Šiklić (born 24 November 1980) is a Croatian former professional footballer who played as a defender.

== Honours ==
Slavia Prague

- Czech First League: 2008–09
