= Mladen Pelaić =

Croatian footballer

Personal information
- Date of birth: 20 August 1983 (age 43)
- Place of birth: Zagreb, SR Croatia, SFR Yugoslavia
- Height: 1.84 m (6 ft 0 in)
- Positions: Right back; right winger

Youth career
- 2000–2004: Dinamo Zagreb

Senior career*
Years	Team	Apps	(Gls)
2004–2006	NK Zagreb	56	(9)
2006	Standard Liège	1	(0)
2007–2010	Hajduk Split	28	(0)
2010–2011	Osijek	14	(0)
2011–2013	NK Zagreb	36	(0)
2013–2014	Lučko	25	(2)
2014–2015	Rudeš	21	(4)

International career
2004–2005	Croatia U-21	13	(0)
- * Club domestic league appearances and goals

Mladen Pelaić (born 20 August 1983) is a Croatian retired football player who last played for NK Rudeš.

== Club career ==
He joined Standard Liège from NK Zagreb in summer 2006, signed 3-year deal, but 6 months later he was back to Croatia to join Hajduk Split, again signed 3-year deal.

== International career ==
He has been capped for the Croatian national youth team and has participated in UEFA U-19 and U-21 tournaments.
