= Danijel Mađarić =

Croatian footballer (born 1974)

Personal information
- Full name: Danijel Mađarić
- Date of birth: 13 November 1974 (age 51)
- Place of birth: Čakovec, Croatia
- Height: 1.88 m (6 ft 2 in)
- Position: Goalkeeper

Senior career*
Years	Team	Apps	(Gls)
1996–2003	Varteks	67	(0)
2003–2006	Zagłębie Lubin	52	(0)
2006–2009	Varteks	64	(0)
2009	Čakovec		
2010	Međimurje	6	(0)
- * Club domestic league appearances and goals

Danijel Mađarić (born 13 November 1974) is a Croatian former professional footballer who played as a goalkeeper.

== Club career ==
Mađarić started his professional career with NK Varteks in 1996 and left the club for Polish side Zagłębie Lubin in 2003, eventually returning to Varteks in 2006. He left Varteks in the summer of 2009 and was briefly without a club, before joining NK Čakovec in the fourth tier of Croatian football on a short-term contract in September 2009. He went on to join NK Međimurje in January 2010, becoming the club's first-choice goalkeeper in the latter stages of the 2009–10 season, which saw them being relegated from the Croatian First League.

In February 2011, he was sentenced to seven months in prison for his involvement in match fixing during his spell with NK Međimurje the previous season. He subsequently received a lifetime ban by the Croatian Football Federation.
