= Gordan Golik =

Croatian football midfielder (born 1985)

Personal information
- Date of birth: 4 March 1985 (age 41)
- Place of birth: Varaždin, SR Croatia, SFR Yugoslavia
- Height: 1.84 m (6 ft 1/2 in)
- Position: Midfielder

Youth career
- 1997–2003: Varteks

Senior career*
| Years | Team | Apps | (Gls) |
| 2003–2008 | Varteks | 81 | (3) |
| 2008–2010 | Lech Poznań | 2 | (0) |
| 2011–2012 | Varaždin | 9 | (0) |
| 2012 | Zavrč | 1 | (0) |
| 2012–2015 | Međimurje | 79 | (15) |
| 2015–2016 | Vinogradar | 11 | (0) |
| 2016 | Međimurje | 29 | (7) |
| 2017 | Varaždin | 8 | (0) |
| 2017 | NK Tehničar 1974 | 8 | (3) |
| 2018 | Međjimurec | 12 | (3) |
| 2019 | Međimurje-Čakovec | 8 | (3) |
| 2019–2020 | Jadran Poreč | 13 | (3) |
| Total | | 261 | (37) |

International career
| 2003 | Croatia U18 | 2 | (0) |
| 2003 | Croatia U19 | 2 | (0) |
- * Club domestic league appearances and goals

Gordan Golik (born 4 March 1985) is a Croatian former professional footballer who played as a midfielder.

== Club career ==
Golik came up through his hometown youth academy, Varteks, where he captained the team in all youth levels. Golik started his senior career with Varteksin the 2003–04 season, playing in the top level Prva HNL. He moved to Poland to play with Lech Poznań in 2008, returning to his Croatian club, renamed NK Varaždin, in 2011. After a few more moves, Golik returned to his hometown in 2017, when he signed with a new NK Varaždin, unassociated with the organization he started his career with, which folded in 2015. In 2018, Golik joined NK Međimurec Dunjkovec-Pretetinec.

== International career ==
In 2003, Golik earned two caps each for the Croatia U18 and Croatia U19 teams, all of which came from friendly matches.

== Honours ==
Lech Poznań

- Ekstraklasa: 2009–10
