= Ivan Parlov =

Croatian football midfielder (born 1984)

Personal information
- Full name: Ivan Parlov
- Date of birth: 3 April 1984 (age 42)
- Place of birth: Zagreb, SR Croatia, SFR Yugoslavia
- Height: 1.84 m (6 ft 0 in)
- Position: Central midfielder

Youth career
- –2003: Hrvatski Dragovoljac

Senior career*
Years	Team	Apps	(Gls)
2003	Hrvatski Dragovoljac	23	(10)
2003–2005	Dinamo Zagreb	20	(9)
2004–2005	→ Segesta (loan)	26	(1)
2005–2011	Zagreb	123	(11)
2011–2012	Mattersburg	39	(0)
2012–2013	Apollon Limassol	23	(2)
2014–2015	Slaven Belupo	5	(1)
2015–2016	Inter Zaprešić	2	(0)
2016	Fram Reykjavík	16	(2)
2017	ASK Oberdorf	29	(7)
2018	ASK Goberling	0	(0)
2018–2019	SC Schachendorf	33	(17)

International career
2002	Croatia U18	1	(0)
2002	Croatia U19	4	(0)
2003–2004	Croatia U20	2	(0)
2003–2006	Croatia U21	3	(0)
- * Club domestic league appearances and goals as of 3 June 2018

Ivan Parlov (born 3 April 1984) is a Croatian retired football midfielder.

== Career ==
Parlov had spells abroad in Iceland with Fram Reykjavík and in Austria with Mattersburg and in the lower leagues.
