= Ivica Vrdoljak =

Croatian professional retired footballer (born 1983)

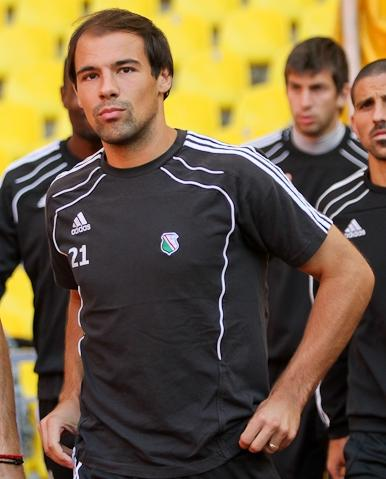
- Vrdoljak with Legia Warsaw

Personal information
- Full name: Ivica Vrdoljak
- Date of birth: 19 September 1983 (age 43)
- Place of birth: Novi Sad, SR Serbia, SFR Yugoslavia
- Height: 1.87 m (6 ft 2 in)
- Positions: Centre-back; defensive midfielder

Youth career
- 1990–1999: Vojvodina
- 1999–2002: NK Zagreb

Senior career*
Years	Team	Apps	(Gls)
2002–2007	NK Zagreb	81	(3)
2002–2003	→ Lučko (loan)		
2003–2004	→ Croatia Sesvete (loan)	22	(4)
2007–2010	Dinamo Zagreb	80	(6)
2010–2016	Legia Warsaw	128	(20)
2016–2017	Wisła Płock	0	(0)

International career
2004–2005	Croatia U21	7	(0)
- * Club domestic league appearances and goals

Ivica Vrdoljak (pronounced [îʋit͡sa ʋr̩dǒʎaːk]; born 19 September 1983) is a Croatian former professional footballer who played mainly as a defensive midfielder.

== Club career ==
Vrdoljak started playing football at his homeclub, Serbian top league club FK Vojvodina, where he played for the youth teams until 1999, when he moved to Zagreb, Croatia, and settled in the youth system of the Croatian top flight side NK Zagreb. After graduating to the senior team he was sent on loans to NK Lučko and the second division team Croatia Sesvete. Vrdoljak had a good season at Croatia Sesvete, scoring four goals and featuring in 22 league matches, and after that he was returned to NK Zagreb. In three seasons at the club he made 81 league appearances and scored three goals. He was then, along with his teammate Mario Mandžukić, transferred to Croatian powerhouse Dinamo Zagreb for a fee of €1 million. Since his arrival, Vrdoljak has established himself as a consistent first-team player. In his debut season for Dinamo he played in twenty-four league matches and bagged three goals. The next season, he was irreplaceable in the midfield and made 29 league appearances by the end of the season and scored three more goals.

While playing for Legia Warsaw, during the qualifiers 2014–15 UEFA Champions League qualifying round, Vrdoljak missed two penalties in a 4–1 win over against Celtic. After being sidelined throughout the 2015–16 season due to a knee injury, he left Legia in the summer of 2016. Shortly after, he joined another Ekstraklasa outfit Wisła Płock, however after failing to make a single appearance, he decided to ultimately retire.

== International career ==
He is also a former Croatia under-21 international and capped seven times at the under-21 level during the 2004–05 season.

== Career statistics ==
Appearances and goals by club, season and competition
Club	Season	League			National cup (Note: Includes Croatian Cup, Polish Cup)		Continental		Other		Total	
Club	Season	Division	Apps	Goals	Apps	Goals	Apps	Goals	Apps	Goals	Apps	Goals
Croatia Sesvete (loan)	2003–04	Druga HNL	22	4	3	2	—		—		25	6
NK Zagreb	2004–05	Prva HNL	25	1	1	0	—		—		26	1
NK Zagreb	2005–06	Prva HNL	25	0		0	—		—		25	0
NK Zagreb	2006–07	Prva HNL	31	2	4	0	—		—		35	2
NK Zagreb	Total		81	3	5	0	—		—		86	3
Dinamo Zagreb	2007–08	Prva HNL	24	3	7	0	2 (Note: One appearance in UEFA Champions League, one appearance in UEFA Cup)	0	—		33	3
Dinamo Zagreb	2008–09	Prva HNL	29	3	4	0	12 (Note: Six appearances and one goal in UEFA Champions League, six appearances and one goal in UEFA Cup)	2	—		45	5
Dinamo Zagreb	2009–10	Prva HNL	27	0	5	0	12 (Note: Four appearances in UEFA Champions League, eight appearances and one goal in UEFA Europa League)	1	—		44	1
Dinamo Zagreb	Total		80	6	16	0	26	3	—		122	9
Legia Warsaw	2010–11	Ekstraklasa	26	5	6	3	—		—		32	8
Legia Warsaw	2011–12	Ekstraklasa	24	4	6	0	10 (Note: Appearances in UEFA Europa League)	0	0	0	40	4
Legia Warsaw	2012–13	Ekstraklasa	20	2	6	0	2	0	1 (Note: Appearance in Polish Super Cup)	0	29	2
Legia Warsaw	2013–14	Ekstraklasa	30	5	1	0	10 (Note: Six appearances in UEFA Champions League, four appearances in UEFA Europa League)	0	—		41	5
Legia Warsaw	2014–15	Ekstraklasa	28	4	6	2	14 (Note: Four appearances in UEFA Champions League, ten appearances and one goal in UEFA Europa League)	1	1	0	49	7
Legia Warsaw	2015–16	Ekstraklasa	0	0	0	0	0	0	0	0	0	0
Legia Warsaw	Total		128	20	25	5	36	1	2	0	191	26
Wisła Płock	2016–17	Ekstraklasa	0	0	0	0	—		—		0	0
Career total			311	33	49	7	62	4	2	0	424	44

== Honours ==
Dinamo Zagreb

- Croatian First League: 2007–08, 2008–09, 2009–10
- Croatian Cup: 2007–08, 2008–09

Legia Warsaw

- Ekstraklasa: 2012–13, 2013–14
- Polish Cup: 2010–11, 2011–12, 2012–13
