= Ivan Banović =

Croatian footballer

Personal information
- Date of birth: 1 February 1984 (age 42)
- Place of birth: Split, SFR Yugoslavia
- Height: 1.91 m (6 ft 3 in)
- Position: Goalkeeper

Team information
- Current team: Mosor

Youth career
- RNK Split

Senior career*
Years	Team	Apps	(Gls)
- RNK Split
2002–2005	Mosor		
2005–2006	Solin	22	(0)
2006–2010	Međimurje	62	(0)
2010	Sesvete	13	(0)
2019-	Mosor		
- * Club domestic league appearances and goals as of 9 January 2011

Ivan Banović (born 1 February 1984) is a Croatian football goalkeeper who currently plays for Mosor.

== Club career ==
Banović started his professional career in the Croatian second division, spending the 2004–05 season with Mosor, amassing 21 appearances before moving to Solin for the 2005–06 season. He made a total of 43 league appearances during the two seasons, securing himself a move to the Croatian top flight in the summer of 2006, signing with Međimurje.

At Međimurje, he started out as the second-choice goalkeeper, with two league appearances early in the season being his only top-flight appearances during his first season with the club. He managed to become the club's first-choice goalkeeper midway through the 2007–08 season, keeping his place despite the club's relegation from the top flight at the end of the season and going on to help them return to the top flight for the 2009–10 season. He made a total of 62 league appearances for Međimurje during his three and a half seasons with the club, 35 of which were in the top flight.

In January 2010, he moved to Croatia Sesvete, who were bottom of the table in the Croatian First League for most of the 2009–10 season, to serve as their new first-choice goalkeeper. He appeared in all of the club's 13 matches in the second half of the 2009–10 season, but eventually could not do much to help them avoid relegation as they were not able to move away from the 16th place in the top flight.

He came out of retirement in 2019 to rejoin Mosor.

== "Cat rescue" incident ==
On 23 November 2009, Banović attracted attention from the media for rescuing a lost cat that strayed onto the pitch during a Croatian First League match between Šibenik and Međimurje. He picked up the cat and carried it off the pitch to a safe place under the scoreboard behind his goal. As a result, he was somewhat controversially booked for leaving the pitch without permission.
