= Tomislav Bašić (footballer) =

Bosnian-Herzegovinian footballer

Personal information
- Full name: Tomislav Bašić
- Date of birth: 4 May 1980 (age 46)
- Place of birth: Lištica, Bosnia and Herzegovina, Yugoslavia
- Height: 6 ft 3 in (1.91 m)
- Position: Goalkeeper

Senior career*
Years	Team	Apps	(Gls)
2000–2005	Posušje	14	(0)
2005–2007	Široki Brijeg	30	(0)
2007–2008	Međimurje Čakovec	7	(0)
2008	Posušje	0	(0)
2008–2009	Arka Gdynia	1	(0)
2010	Zawisza Bydgoszcz	2	(0)
2010–2011	Imotski	15	(0)
2011–2012	Hamyari Arak		
2011	Saipa Shomal		
2012–2013	Imotski	20	(0)
2014–2016	Konavljanin	21	(0)
2016–2017	Imotski	1	(0)
2018	Župa		
2018–2019	Mračaj		
- * Club domestic league appearances and goals

Tomislav Bašić (born 4 May 1980) is a Bosnian former professional footballer who played as a goalkeeper.

== Honours ==
Široki Brijeg

- Premier League of Bosnia and Herzegovina: 2005–06
- Bosnia and Herzegovina Cup: 2006–07
