= Goran Sablić =

Croatian football manager (born 1979)

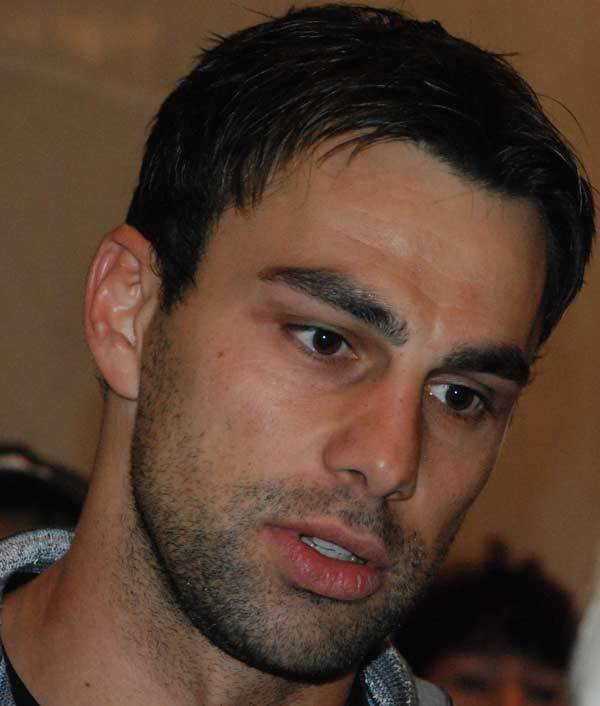
- Sablić in 2009

Personal information
- Date of birth: 4 August 1979 (age 47)
- Place of birth: Sinj, SR Croatia, SFR Yugoslavia
- Height: 1.90 m (6 ft 3 in)
- Position: Defender

Youth career
- 1987–1994: Junak Sinj
- 1994–1998: Hajduk Split

Senior career*
Years	Team	Apps	(Gls)
1998–2002	Hajduk Split	81	(3)
2002–2010	Dynamo Kyiv	52	(2)
2002–2006	→ Dynamo-2 Kyiv	4	(0)
2007–2008	→ Hajduk Split (loan)	16	(0)
Total		153	(5)

International career
2002–2006	Croatia	5	(0)

Managerial career
- 2012–2013: Split (assistant)
- 2013: Split
- 2013–2014: Split U-17
- 2014–2015: Split U-19
- 2015–2016: Split
- 2017–2018: Široki Brijeg
- 2018–2019: Sheriff Tiraspol
- 2020–2021: Hajduk Split II
- 2021: Sarajevo
- 2025: Velež Mostar
- * Club domestic league appearances and goals

Goran Sablić (born 4 August 1979) is a Croatian professional football manager and former player. He spent most of his career in Croatia, playing for Hajduk Split and has also played for Ukrainian side Dynamo Kyiv. He made his senior international debut for Croatia in 2002, earning 5 caps until 2006.

Sablić has had two spells as manager of RNK Split, he was once manager of Bosnian Premier League club Široki Brijeg and also managed Moldovan First League club Sheriff Tiraspol. From 2020 until 2021, he was the manager of Hajduk's reserves and youth team. From June until December 2021, Sablić was manager of Sarajevo in the Bosnian Premier League. He had a short stint as manager of Velež Mostar in 2025.

== Club career ==
Sablić started his career in Junak Sinj after coming from the club's youth academy. He won the Croatian championship in 2001 and the Croatian Cup in 2000 with Hajduk Split.

He then signed a four-year contract with Dynamo Kyiv on 12 August 2002. With Dynamo Kyiv, Sablić won the Ukrainian Premier League in 2003, 2004 and 2009. He also won the Ukrainian Cup in 2003, 2005 and 2006. After many injury problems, he agreed to go on a loan to reach his previous form. On 30 July 2007, Dynamo Kyiv agreed to loan Sablić to his former club Hajduk for one year. In 2008, he returned to Dynamo and in 2010 he left the club and retired from football.

== International career ==
Sablić made his debut for Croatia in an April 2002 friendly match against Bosnia and Herzegovina, coming on as a 79th-minute substitute for Boris Živković , and earned a total of 5 caps, scoring no goals. His final international was a September 2006 European Championship qualification match away against Russia.

== Managerial career ==
=== Split ===
In October 2012 Sablić started as assistant coach at RNK Split under manager Zoran Vulić.

In May 2013, Sablić became the new manager of RNK Split, but after three matches he was sacked. Instead, he was hired as U-17 coach at the club afterwards, and later also on the U-19 team.

On 30 September 2015 Sablić again became head coach of the club's first team. On 18 July 2016 he resigned.

=== Široki Brijeg ===
During January 2017, Sablić was named the new manager of Bosnian Premier League club Široki Brijeg. In his first season, he guided the club to win the 2016–17 Bosnian Cup. In his second season with Široki, the club finished on 4th place in the 2017–18 Bosnian Premier League and made it to the quarterfinals of the 2017–18 Bosnian Cup where they got eliminated by eventual winners Željezničar. Sablić left the club after the end of the 2017–18 season.

=== Sheriff Tiraspol ===
On 7 June 2018, Sablić was appointed manager of Moldovan First League club Sheriff Tiraspol with whom in his first season as manager, won the Moldovan Championship three games before the end of the season. On 27 April 2019, after a 1–0 away league loss against Petrocub Hîncești, he unexpectedly resigned even though Sheriff at the time were on 1st place in the league.

=== Hajduk Split II ===
On 15 December 2020, Sablić was announced as the new manager of Hajduk Split II, the Hajduk Split reserves and youth team.

=== Sarajevo ===
On 12 June 2021, Sablić became the new manager of Sarajevo, marking his return to the Bosnian Premier League. In his first game as Sarajevo manager, Sablić's team drew against Moldovan club Milsami Orhei in a UEFA Europa Conference League qualifying round on 8 July 2021. His first loss as the club's manager was an unexpected one in the second leg game against Milsami a week later on 15 July, thus knocking out Sarajevo only in the first qualifying round of the Europa Conference League.

Sablić guided the team to his first win as manager in a league game against Posušje on 25 July 2021. In his first ever Sarajevo derby, Sarajevo beat fierce city rivals Željezničar in a league match on 22 September 2021.

On 27 December 2021, Sablić terminated his contract with Sarajevo and left the club, following mixed results.

=== Hajduk Split ===
In August 2022, Sablić was employed as the head of the under-14 to under-19 teams at Hajduk Split's youth academy. On 25 April 2024, he took over Boro Primorac's position as head of the Youth Academy.

=== Velež Mostar ===
On 12 June 2025, Sablić was appointed manager of Velež Mostar. His first competitive game in charge of Velež ended in a 2–1 away loss to Sloga Doboj on 26 July 2025. On 10 August 2025, Sablić recorded his first win at Velež, defeating his former club Široki Brijeg. In his first Mostar derby, Velež lost to rivals Zrinjski 3–1 at home on 27 September 2025. Sablić resigned as manager the following day, on 28 September, with Velež winning only seven points in their first nine league games.

== Managerial statistics ==
As of match played 27 September 2025

Managerial record by team and tenure
Team	From	To	Record							
Team	From	To	G	W	D	L	GF	GA	GD	Win %
Split (caretaker)	13 May 2013	5 June 2013	2	0	1	1	2	3	−1	0.00
Split	30 September 2015	18 July 2016	26	6	13	7	17	21	−4	23.08
Široki Brijeg	17 January 2017	6 June 2018	60	27	15	18	84	51	+33	45.00
Sheriff Tiraspol	7 June 2018	27 April 2019	35	21	5	9	64	24	+40	60.00
Hajduk Split II	14 December 2020	11 June 2021	18	6	5	7	35	32	+3	33.33
Sarajevo	12 June 2021	27 December 2021	23	10	5	8	23	18	+5	43.48
Velež Mostar	12 June 2025	28 September 2025	9	2	1	6	9	15	−6	22.22
Total			173	72	45	56	234	164	+70	41.62

== Honours ==
=== Player ===
Hajduk Split

- Croatian First League: 2000–01
- Croatian Cup: 1999–2000

Dynamo Kyiv

- Ukrainian Premier League: 2002–03, 2003–04, 2008–09
- Ukrainian Cup: 2002–03, 2004–05, 2005–06
- Ukrainian Super Cup: 2004, 2006, 2007, 2009

=== Manager ===
Široki Brijeg

- Bosnian Cup: 2016–17

Sheriff Tiraspol

- Moldovan National Division: 2018
