= Ante Rukavina =

Croatian footballer (born 1986)

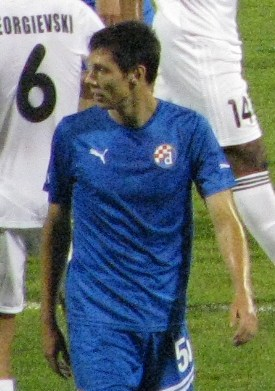
- Rukavina playing for Dinamo Zagreb in 2011

Personal information
- Date of birth: 18 June 1986 (age 40)
- Place of birth: Šibenik, SR Croatia, Yugoslavia
- Height: 1.86 m (6 ft 1 in)
- Position: Forward

Senior career*
Years	Team	Apps	(Gls)
2004–2007	Šibenik	52	(15)
2007–2008	Hajduk Split	35	(9)
2008–2010	Panathinaikos	36	(7)
2010–2016	Dinamo Zagreb	103	(20)
2014–2015	→ Lokomotiva (loan)	29	(3)
2015–2016	→ Viborg (loan)	5	(0)
Total		260	(54)

International career
2006–2007	Croatia U20	5	(1)
2007–2008	Croatia U21	9	(6)
- * Club domestic league appearances and goals as of 14 September 2016

Ante Rukavina (born 18 June 1986) is a Croatian retired footballer. He played for HNK Šibenik, Hajduk Split, and Dinamo Zagreb as well as Greek club Panathinaikos.

== Club career ==
Rukavina started his professional career with his hometown club HNK Šibenik. He made his debut for Šibenik on 29 July 2006 under coach Ivan Pudar against NK Osijek, having turned 20 years old just one month earlier. After making a name for himself as one of the hottest young prospects in the Croatian First Football League, he moved down the Croatian coast to Split side Hajduk in a deal worth around €400,000 in January 2007. Over the next 18 months at Hajduk, Ante continued impressing European scouts by scoring 9 goals in 34 appearances in what was a difficult time for the Croatian giants.

On 5 July 2008, he signed for the Greek side Panathinaikos who saw him as a useful addition to their offensive lineup for the next season', considering him to be an 'impressive young prospect'. The four-year deal was reportedly worth €2.8 million. In two seasons at Panathinaikos, Rukavina managed 11 goals in 55 appearances but was ultimately judged as a flop considering his high fee and high expectations when he arrived at the Greek side.

=== Dinamo Zagreb ===
On 26 July 2010, Rukavina returned to Croatia and signed for champions Dinamo Zagreb in a transfer worth €700,000.

He made his debut for the club on 4 August 2010 at home to Moldovan side Sheriff Tiraspol in the return leg of the third qualifying round for the UEFA Champions League. On 7 August 2010, he made his domestic league debut for Dinamo in a 1–1 draw at NK Varaždin, netting the opening goal of the match in the fifth minute. Later that month, he scored a brace to give the club a 2–0 win at Hungarian Győr FC in the first leg of the UEFA Europa League play-offs. He went on to make five appearances in the group stage of the UEFA Europa League, scoring the opening goal in a 2–0 win at home to Villarreal on 16 September 2010.

On 18 July 2012, Rukavina scored a last-minute goal against Bulgarian club Ludogorets Razgrad in a Champions League match to help his team to a 1–1 draw. He also netted twice in the return leg held a week later, which was won in a dramatic fashion by the Croatian side by a score of 3–2.

In January 2014, it was decided by Dinamo's sporting director and manager Zoran Mamic that Rukavina was surplus to the club's requirements. He was sent home early from Dinamo's winter training camp in Turkey and was told he was free to find a new club.

In August 2014 he moved to NK Lokomotiva on a loan.

In August 2015 he moved to Viborg FF in the Danish Superliga on loan, but only played 5 matches as substitute and not scoring any goals.

== International career ==
Rukavina played for the Croatian national under-21 team between 2007 and 2008, Rukavina was called up to the senior side squad for the first time on 12 March 2007, but did not appear for his country at full international level.

== Career statistics ==
As of 26 October 2012

Club	Season	League		Cup		Supercup		Europe		Total	
Club	Season	Apps	Goals	Apps	Goals	Apps	Goals	Apps	Goals	Apps	Goals
HNK Šibenik	2006–07	7	6	0	0	0	0	0	0	7	6
HNK Hajduk Split	2006–07	6	0	0	0	0	0	0	0	6	0
HNK Hajduk Split	2007–08	26	9	0	0	0	0	2	0	28	9
Panathinaikos	2008–09	25	7	3	1	0	0	7	0	35	8
Panathinaikos	2009–10	11	0	2	2	0	0	7	1	20	3
GNK Dinamo Zagreb	2010–11	21	4	6	0	0	0	8	3	35	7
GNK Dinamo Zagreb	2011–12	19	5	2	0	0	0	10	1	31	6
GNK Dinamo Zagreb	2012–13	23	4	1	0	0	0	9	3	33	7
GNK Dinamo Zagreb	2013–14	6	1	3	0	0	0	6	1	15	2
Total		144	36	17	3	0	0	49	9	210	48

== Honours ==
Panathinaikos

- Super League Greece: 2009–10
- Greek Football Cup: 2009–10

Dinamo Zagreb

- Croatian First League (4) : 2010–11, 2011–12, 2012–13, 2013–14
- Croatian Cup (2) : 2010–11, 2011–12
- Croatian Supercup (1) : 2013

Individual

- Croatian Hope of the Year : 2006
