= Vedran Ivanković =

Croatian footballer

Personal information
- Date of birth: 3 May 1983 (age 43)
- Place of birth: Zenica, SR Bosnia and Herzegovina, SFR Yugoslavia
- Height: 1.89 m (6 ft 2 in)
- Position: Defender

Senior career*
Years	Team	Apps	(Gls)
2003–2004	Cibalia	10	(0)
2004–2011	Zagreb	132	(3)
2012	Sopron	5	(0)
2012–2013	Hrvatski Dragovoljac	3	(0)
2013	Vinogradar	13	(1)
2013	Krka	13	(0)
2013–2014	SV Röchling Völklingen		

International career
	Croatia U20	1	(0)
	Croatia U21	1	(0)
- * Club domestic league appearances and goals

Vedran Ivanković (born 3 May 1983) is a Croatian former professional footballer who played as a defender.
