= Željko Malčić =

Croatian footballer

Personal information
- Date of birth: 15 November 1981 (age 44)
- Place of birth: Vinkovci, Croatia
- Position: Forward

Senior career*
Years	Team	Apps	(Gls)
2006–2007	Zrinski Tordinci		
2007–2010	Cibalia	65	(24)
2010–2012	Šibenik	35	(6)
2012–2013	Zrinski Tordinci		
2013	Junak	12	(2)
2013–2016	GOŠK Gabela		
2016-2017	Primorac Biograd		
2017	Lovor		
2017-2019	Zagora Unešić		
- * Club domestic league appearances and goals

Željko Malčić (born 15 November 1981) is a Croatian former footballer who played as a forward.
