= Josip Tadić =

Croatian footballer (born 1987)

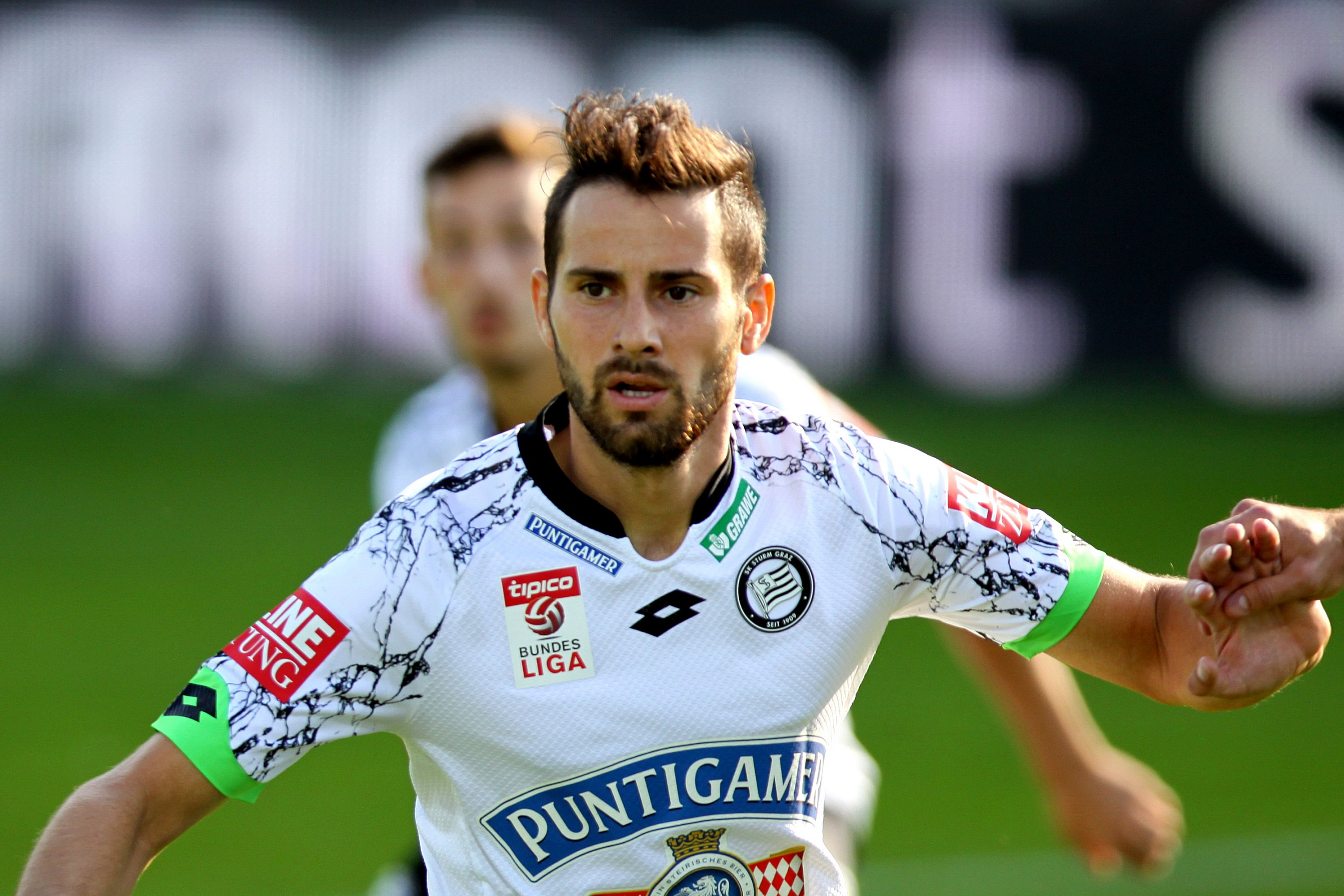
- Tadić playing for Sturm Graz in 2015

Personal information
- Full name: Josip Tadić
- Date of birth: 22 August 1987 (age 39)
- Place of birth: Đakovo, Croatia
- Height: 1.87 m (6 ft 2 in)
- Position: Striker

Team information
- Current team: Jarun
- Number: 9

Youth career
- Croatia Đakovo
- NK Osijek

Senior career*
Years	Team	Apps	(Gls)
2004–2005	Osijek	20	(7)
2005–2006	Bayer Leverkusen	1	(0)
2005–2006	Bayer Leverkusen II	26	(6)
2006–2009	Dinamo Zagreb	62	(20)
2009–2010	Grenoble Foot 38	19	(0)
2011	Arminia Bielefeld	14	(5)
2011	Omonia Nicosia	0	(0)
2011–2012	Lechia Gdańsk	11	(0)
2012–2013	Melbourne Heart	22	(6)
2013–2014	Rijeka	1	(0)
2013–2014	→ Zadar (loan)	24	(6)
2014–2015	Sturm Graz	35	(4)
2016	Balıkesirspor	8	(1)
2017	Slaven Belupo	12	(1)
2017–2018	Sūduva Marijampolė	23	(12)
2018–2019	Kitchee	11	(5)
2019–2020	Sūduva Marijampolė	34	(21)
2021–2022	Žalgiris	52	(16)
2023–	Jarun	44	(9)

International career
2005–2008	Croatia U21	22	(5)
- * Club domestic league appearances and goals as of 22 August 2024

Josip Tadić (born 22 August 1987) is a Croatian professional footballer who plays as a striker for Jarun.

== Club career ==
=== Osijek and Bayer Leverkusen ===
Tadić started his professional career with NK Osijek in the 2004–05 Croatian First League season. After scoring 7 goals in 20 league appearances for the club, he moved to German Bundesliga side Bayer Leverkusen in the summer of 2005.

At Leverkusen, he mostly played for the reserve squad in the Regionalliga, the third tier of German football at the time, where he scored 6 goals in 26 appearances. His only Bundesliga appearance came on 17 December 2005 in a goalless draw at home to Hannover 96, where he came on as a substitute for Tranquillo Barnetta in the 85th minute.

=== Dinamo Zagreb ===
In the winter break of the 2006–07 Croatian First League season, Tadić signed a three-and-a-half-year contract with Dinamo Zagreb, the league's defending champions at the time. He scored five goals in 13 league appearances for the club until the end of the season, helping them to defend the title.

In his second season with Dinamo Zagreb, he scored 11 goals in 27 league appearances and helped the club to their third consecutive league title. He also featured regularly for the club in the European competition, making three appearances in the UEFA Champions League qualifying and five in the UEFA Cup. On 24 July 2007, he scored the final goal in a 3–1 extra-time win at home to FK Khazar Lankaran in the Champions League qualifying, which was his only goal in the European competition that season. On 10 May 2008, he scored a hat-trick in his side's 6–1 win at home to NK Rijeka, their final league match of the season.

His third season with the club saw him scoring just four goals in 22 league appearances, with all of the four goals coming before the winter break. The club nevertheless won their fourth consecutive league title at the end of the season. He also made 7 appearances in the European competition that season, scoring his only goal in a 3–0 away win at NK Domžale in the Champions League qualifying on 30 July 2008.

=== Grenoble ===
On 4 July 2009, Tadić signed a four-year contract with French Ligue 1 side Grenoble Foot 38. He made his league debut in the club's opening match of the season, a 2–0 defeat at home to Olympique de Marseille on 8 August 2009.

On 11 September 2009, it was announced that Tadić would be sidelined in order to undergo surgery for an ankle injury received during a friendly match against Servette the previous week. He made his league comeback on 16 January 2010 in a 2–1 defeat at home to AS Saint-Étienne. He made a total of 14 league appearances in his first season with Grenoble, without scoring a goal.

Tadić stayed at the club following their relegation to the Ligue 2 at the end of the 2009–10 season. However, after making just five appearances in the league, again without scoring a goal, he was allowed to leave the club on a free transfer in the winter break of the 2010–11 season.

=== Arminia Bielefeld ===
On 30 December 2010, German 2. Bundesliga side Arminia Bielefeld announced Tadić as their latest signing. The striker signed a six-month contract, would will be automatically extended for another season if the team avoids relegation.

He made his league debut for the club on 16 January 2011 in a 1–1 draw at home to FSV Frankfurt. On 30 January 2011, he scored his first goal for Arminia Bielefeld in the club's 3–1 defeat at home to Hertha BSC.

=== AC Omonia ===
On 14 July 2011, Tadić completed his transfer to the Cypriot club AC Omonia, on a free transfer. At the transfer deadline (31 August) of the same summer his contract was released because he wasn't good enough for the team and the coach.

=== Lechia Gdańsk ===
In August 2011, he joined Lechia Gdańsk on a two-year contract.

=== Melbourne Heart ===
On 14 July 2012 it was announced he had signed with Australian A-League club Melbourne Heart.

=== Rijeka ===
On 4 June 2013, Tadić had signed a two-year contract with Croatia's top tier outfit, Rijeka.

=== Kitchee ===
On 12 July 2018, Tadić was presented as a player for Hong Kong Premier League side Kitchee. In June 2019 he left the club.

== International career ==
From 2002 and 2008, Tadić won 49 caps and scored 9 goals as a Croatian youth international, representing the country from under-15 to under-21. He debuted for the Croatian national under-21 team on 9 February 2005 in a friendly against Israel and went on to make 22 appearances and score 5 goals at that level, with his last appearance coming in a friendly against Hungary on 26 March 2008, where he scored a goal.

He has yet to feature for the Croatia.

== Honours ==
Dinamo Zagreb

- Croatian First Football League: 2006–07, 2007–08, 2008–09
- Croatian Cup: 2006–07, 2007–08, 2008–09

Sūduva

- A Lyga: 2017, 2019
- Lithuanian Football Cup: 2019
- Lithuanian Supercup: 2018

Kitchee

- Hong Kong Senior Shield: 2018–19
- Hong Kong FA Cup: 2018–19
- Hong Kong Community Cup: 2018

Žalgiris

- A Lyga: 2021
- Lithuanian Football Cup: 2021
