= Stadion SRC Mladost, Čakovec =

Stadium in Čakovec, Croatia

Coordinates: 46°23′30″N 16°25′20″E

SRC Mladost
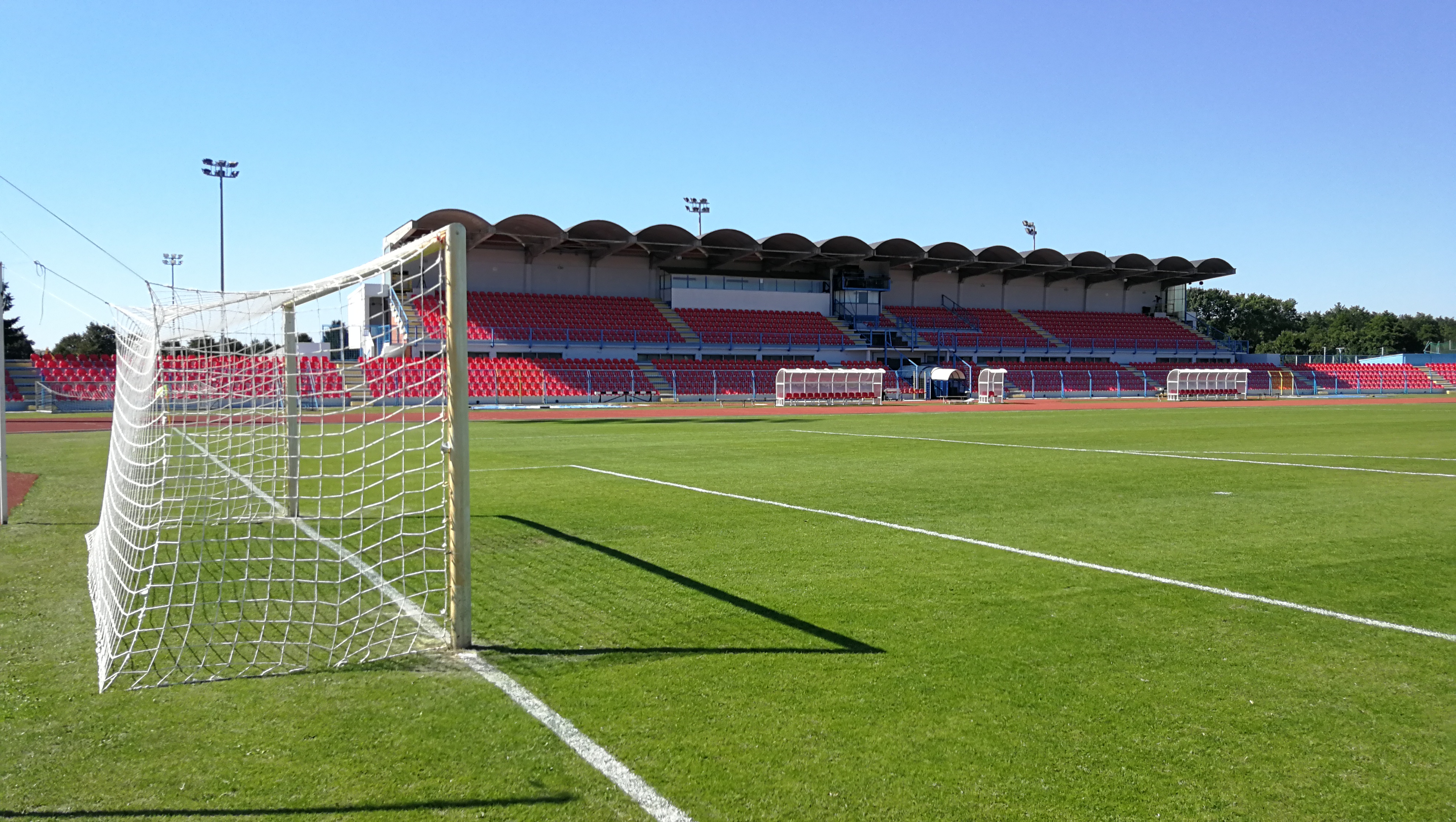
- Interactive map of SRC Mladost
- Full name: Stadion Sportsko-rekreacijskoga centra Mladost
- Location: Čakovec, Croatia
- Owner: City of Čakovec
- Capacity: 8,000 (5,000 seating)
- Surface: Natural grass
- Field size: 110 x 75 metres

Construction
- Built: mid-1980s
- Opened: 1987

Tenants
- NK Čakovec (1987-2011); NK Međimurje (2003-present)

Stadion SRC Mladost is a multi-purpose stadium in Čakovec, Croatia. The approximate capacity of the stadium is 8,000 places, including around 5,000 seats.

The stadium is owned by the city of Čakovec and primarily used for football matches and various athletics events. The football clubs currently using the stadium as their home ground are NK Čakovec and NK Međimurje. Occasionally, it is also used to stage concerts and similar events.

The stadium was built in the mid-1980s for the purposes of the 1987 Summer Universiade. It is located in the Mladost Centre for Sports and Recreation (SRC Mladost), in the northwestern suburban part of the city of Čakovec. The complex also includes several other sports fields, a sports hall and a bathing resort.

Originally, the stadium only had around 1,500 seats, all under the roof in the upper tier of the main stand. However, following the first promotion of NK Međimurje to the Croatian First League in 2004, the seating capacity of the stadium was expanded from 1,500 to 5,000 seats. In April and May 2009, the stadium was also equipped with floodlighting and a digital scoreboard. The main auxiliary pitch of the stadium is also floodlit. The first floodlit competitive match in the stadium was played on 25 July 2009 between NK Međimurje and NK Karlovac in the Croatian First League, ending in a 1-1 draw.

== International matches ==
| Date | Competition | Teams | Score |
|---|---|---|---|
| 26 March 1996 | Friendly | Croatia U-21 vs. Israel U-21 | 0–0 |
| 24 March 1998 | Friendly | Croatia U-21 vs. Slovakia U-21 | 4–1 |
| 24 April 2001 | Friendly | Croatia U-21 vs. Greece U-21 | 2–2 |
| 26 March 2008 | Friendly | Croatia U-21 vs. Hungary U-21 | 3–1 |
| 7 November 2025 | Friendly | Croatia U-17 vs. Malaysia U-16 | 11–0 |
