= 2007–08 Croatian Football Cup =

Tournament details
- Country: Croatia
- Teams: 48

Final positions
- Champions: Dinamo Zagreb (9th title)
- Runners-up: Hajduk Split

Tournament statistics
- Matches played: 54
- Goals scored: 185 (3.43 per match)
- Top goal scorer: Nikola Kalinić (9)

The 2007–08 Croatian Football Cup was the seventeenth season of Croatia's football knockout competition. Dinamo Zagreb were the defending champion and they won it for a second year running after beating Hajduk Split 3–0 on aggregate.

== Calendar ==
Round	Main date	Number of fixtures	Clubs	New entries this round
Preliminary round	29 August 2007	16	48 → 32	none
First round	26 September 2007	16	32 → 16	16
Second round	24 October 2007	8	16 → 8	none
Quarter-finals	7 and 28 November 2007	8	8 → 4	none
Semi-finals	9 and 23 April 2008	4	4 → 2	none
Final	7 and 14 May 2008	2	2 → 1	none

== Preliminary round ==
The preliminary round was held on 29 August 2007.

Tie no	Home team	Score	Away team
1	Ogulin	4–1	Novalja
2	Olimpija Osijek	0–3	Slavonac CO
3	Trogir	2–0	Istra
4	Primorac Biograd	0–0 (5–4 p)	Zagora Unešić
5	Neretvanac	0–0 (3–5 p)	Bjelovar
6	Đakovo	5–0	Mladost Ždralovi
7	Graničar	1–0	Vrapče
8	Koprivnica	1–4	Virovitica
9	Croatia Sesvete	7–0	Polet Buševec
10	Mladost Varaždin	1–3	Slavonija
11	Klanjec	1–1 (9–10 p)	Zelina
12	Čukovec	0–1	Segesta
13	Mladost Molve	4–3	Rudar Labin
14	Podravina	3–1	Grobničan
15	Oriolik	5–4	Moslavina
16	Međimurje	3–2	Zrinski

== First round ==
Matches played on 26 September 2007.

Tie no	Home team	Score	Away team
1	Zelina	0–4	Rijeka
2	Virovitica	1–3 (aet)	Dinamo Zagreb
3	Mladost Molve	1–9	Hajduk Split
4	Trogir	1–2	Varteks
5	Slavonac CO	0–1	Slaven Belupo
6	Ogulin	2–3	Osijek
7	Oriolik	1–4	Cibalia
8	Đakovo	2–1	Kamen Ingrad
9	Podravina	2–0	Istra 1961
10	Graničar	1–3	NK Zagreb
11	Primorac Biograd	0–5	Inter Zaprešić
12	Slavonija	1–4	Pomorac
13	Bjelovar	3–3 (7–6 p)	Belišće
14	Croatia Sesvete	2–0	Naftaš HAŠK
15	Međimurje	2–2 (6–7 p)	Šibenik
16	Segesta	1–0	Zadar

== Second round ==
Matches played on 24 October 2007.

Tie no	Home team	Score	Away team
1	Segesta	3–0	Rijeka
2	Šibenik	2–3	Dinamo Zagreb
3	Hajduk Split	2–0	Croatia Sesvete
4	Bjelovar	1–1 (3–5 p)	Varteks
5	Slaven Belupo	1–0	Pomorac
6	Inter Zaprešić	1–0	Podravina
7	Đakovo	0–7	NK Zagreb
8	Cibalia	2–1	Osijek

== Quarter-finals ==
First legs were held on 7 November and second legs on 28 November 2007.

Team 1	Agg.	Team 2	1st leg	2nd leg
Segesta	2–3	NK Zagreb	0–0	2–3
Hajduk Split	6–1	Inter Zaprešić	2–1	4–0
Varteks	6–0	Cibalia	4–0	2–0
Slaven Belupo	0–2	Dinamo Zagreb	0–1	0–1

== Semi-finals ==
9 April 2008
18:00 CET

Dinamo Zagreb	3–1	NK Zagreb
Mandžukić 30'; Tadić 42'; Vugrinec 90'	Report (in Croatian)	Ibričić 58'

Stadion Maksimir, Zagreb
Attendance: 1,500
Referee: Domagoj Vučkov (Rijeka)
23 April 2008
16:30 CET

NK Zagreb	2–3	Dinamo Zagreb
Parlov 16'; Pejić 37'	Report (in Croatian)	Mikulić 35' (o.g.); Ivanković 43' (o.g.); Mikić 88'

Stadion Kranjčevićeva, Zagreb
Attendance: 1,500
Referee: Edo Trivković (Split)

Dinamo Zagreb won 6–3 on aggregate.

9 April 2008
18:00 CET

Varteks	1–1	Hajduk Split
Novinić 26'	Report (in Croatian)	Maloča 66'

Stadion Varteks, Varaždin
Attendance: 3,500
Referee: Damir Batinić (Osijek)
23 April 2008
17:00 CET

Hajduk Split	4–0	Varteks
Cernat 15'; Rukavina 32', 60'; Kalinić 45' (pen.)	Report (in Croatian)

Stadion Poljud, Split
Attendance: 10,000
Referee: Vlado Svilokos (Sisak)

Hajduk Split won 5–1 on aggregate.

== Final ==
=== First leg ===
7 May 2008
17:30 CET

Dinamo Zagreb	3–0	Hajduk Split
Tadić 8'; Mandžukić 20', 88'	Report (in Croatian)

Stadion Maksimir, Zagreb
Attendance: 15,000
Referee: Domagoj Ljubičić (Osijek)

=== Second leg ===
14 May 2008
17:30 CET

Hajduk Split	0–0	Dinamo Zagreb
	Report (in Croatian)

Stadion Poljud, Split
Attendance: 6,000
Referee: Ivan Bebek (Rijeka)

Dinamo Zagreb won 3–0 on aggregate.

== See also ==
- 2007–08 Croatian First Football League
- 2007–08 Croatian Second Football League
