= Boris Živković =

Croatian footballer (born 1975)

Personal information
- Date of birth: 15 November 1975 (age 50)
- Place of birth: Živinice, SR Bosnia and Herzegovina, Yugoslavia
- Height: 1.82 m (6 ft 0 in)
- Position: Full-back

Youth career
- 1989–1992: Sarajevo U19

Senior career*
Years	Team	Apps	(Gls)
1993–1994	Sarajevo	11	(1)
1994–1996	Marsonia	44	(1)
1996–1997	Hrvatski Dragovoljac	29	(1)
1997–2003	Bayer Leverkusen	144	(9)
2003	Portsmouth	18	(0)
2004–2006	VfB Stuttgart	23	(0)
2006	→ 1. FC Köln (loan)	8	(1)
2006–2009	Hajduk Split	51	(2)
Total		328	(15)

International career
1999–2007	Croatia	39	(2)
- * Club domestic league appearances and goals

Boris Živković (Croatian pronunciation: [bôːriz ʒǐːʋkoʋit͡ɕ]; born 15 November 1975) is a Croatian former professional footballer who played as a full-back and centre-back.

Živković began his professional career with FK Sarajevo in his native country. He moved to Croatia and signed for Marsonia and later Hrvatski Dragovoljac, before spending six seasons with Bundesliga club Bayer Leverkusen. Following shorter stints at Portsmouth, VfB Stuttgart, and 1. FC Köln, he returned to Croatia to play for Hajduk Split.

At the international level, Živković represented the Croatia national team, making 39 appearances, 18 of which as the team's captain.

== Club career ==
=== Early career ===
Živković started his career in his native country at FK Sarajevo U19 as a youth player, before he began his professional career with FK Sarajevo just at the outset of Bosnian war. He left besieged city of Sarajevo with his club in 1993, and toured the region before FK Sarajevo was invited for a humanitarian tour in Italy in 1994.

After leaving war-torn Bosnia, he signed for Marsonia (from Slavonski Brod) in 1994. He gained a good reputation at Marsonia, making his debut in the 1994–95 season and appearing 13 times. The following season, he played 31 games before transferring to Hrvatski Dragovoljac (from Siget, Zagreb). However, he only spent one season at his new club before impressive performances persuaded German club Bayer Leverkusen to sign him.

=== Bayer Leverkusen ===
Živković played six seasons for the German club, playing over 150 times, including the 2002 UEFA Champions League Final. Following his contract expiring in the summer of 2003, Živković stated his desire to play in the Premier League and was signed by Portsmouth later that summer.

=== Portsmouth and Stuttgart ===
Živković started his Pompey career well, instantly claiming a regular starting place. However, in December, a public fallout with manager Harry Redknapp led to his release, having played only 18 times for the club. VfB Stuttgart stepped in to bring Živković back to Germany, and the Croatian joined them in January.

=== Hajduk Split ===
In August 2006, he moved to Hajduk Split.

== International career ==
Živković was a regular for the Croatia national team, making 39 appearances and scoring twice. He was part of the squad at the 2002 FIFA World Cup, but in his first game against Mexico, he caused a penalty in the 59th minute, after which he was sent off and the Mexicans went on to score from the penalty mark and win the game by 1–0. He was no longer on the team for the remaining two games Croatia played in the tournament before being eliminated — Italy and Mexico progressed from the group to the playoffs.

He also played two games at Euro 2004. Boris was out of favour for Zlatko Kranjčar's World Cup 2006 campaign, but many defender injuries forced Slaven Bilić to give him a call for the Euro 2008 spring qualifying games. His final international was a February 2007 friendly match against Norway.

== Career statistics ==
Scores and results list Croatia's goal tally first, and the score column indicates the score after each Živković goal.

List of international goals scored by Boris Živković
No.	Date	Venue	Opponent	Score	Result	Competition
1	13 November 2001	Gwangju, Gwangju, South Korea	South Korea	1–1	1–1	Friendly
2	30 April 2003	Råsunda, Stockholm, Sweden	Sweden	2–1	2–1	Friendly
