= 2007–08 Croatian First Football League =

T-Com Prva HNL
- Season: 2007–08
- Dates: 20 July 2007 – 10 May 2008
- Champions: Dinamo Zagreb; 10th Croatian title 14th domestic title
- Runner up: Slaven Belupo
- Relegated: Međimurje
- Champions League: Dinamo Zagreb
- UEFA Cup: Slaven Belupo; Hajduk Split (via Cup)
- Intertoto Cup: Rijeka
- Matches: 198
- Goals: 573 (2.89 per match)
- Top goalscorer: Želimir Terkeš (21)
- Biggest home win: Hajduk 7–1 Inter
- Biggest away win: Inter 0–4 Dinamo
- Highest scoring: Hajduk 7–2 Inter; Zagreb 7–2 Zadar; Dinamo 6–3 Zagreb
- Average attendance: 2,759

The 2007–08 Croatian First Football League (also known as 1. HNL; officially styled as T-Com Prva HNL for sponsorship reasons) was the seventeenth season of the Croatian First Football League, the national championship for men's association football teams in Croatia, since its establishment in 1992. The season started on 20 July 2007 and ended on 10 May 2008. Dinamo Zagreb were the defending champions, having won their eleventh championship title the previous season, and they defended the title again, after a win against Međimurje on 12 April 2008.

== Promotion and relegation ==
Kamen Ingrad were automatically relegated to Druga HNL as they finished last in the previous season, while Inter Zaprešić were automatically promoted from Druga HNL after winning the 2006–07 title. In a two-legged playoff between Zadar and Pula, Zadar were promoted to Prva HNL by beating Pula with 6–2 on aggregate (3–0, 3–2).

== Teams ==
Locations of teams in 2007–08 Prva HNL

=== Stadia and personnel ===
Team	Manager^{1}	Location	Stadium	Capacity
Cibalia	(Croatia) Srećko Lušić	Vinkovci	Stadion HNK Cibalia	10,000
Dinamo Zagreb	(Croatia) Zvonimir Soldo	Zagreb	Stadion Maksimir	37,168
Hajduk Split	(Croatia) Robert Jarni	Split	Stadion Poljud	35,000
Inter Zaprešić	(Croatia) Milivoj Bračun	Zagreb	Stadion ŠRC Zaprešić	5,000
Međimurje	(Croatia) Miljenko Dovečer	Čakovec	Stadion SRC Mladost	8,000
Osijek	(Croatia) Ilija Lončarević	Osijek	Stadion Gradski vrt	19,500
Rijeka	(Croatia) Zlatko Dalić	Rijeka	Stadion Kantrida	10,275
Slaven Belupo	(Croatia) Krunoslav Jurčić	Koprivnica	Gradski stadion u Koprivnici	4,000
Šibenik	(Croatia) Ivica Kalinić	Šibenik	Stadion Šubićevac	8,000
Varteks	(Croatia) Dražen Besek	Varaždin	Stadion Varteks	10,800
Zadar	(Croatia) Dalibor Zebić	Zadar	Stadion Stanovi	5,860
NK Zagreb	(Croatia) Miroslav Blažević	Zagreb	Stadion Kranjčevićeva	8,850

- ^{1} On final match day of the season, played on 10 May 2008.

== League table ==
Pos	Team	Pld	W	D	L	GF	GA	GD	Pts	Qualification or relegation
1	Dinamo Zagreb (C)	33	26	4	3	91	34	+57	82	Qualification to Champions League first qualifying round
2	Slaven Belupo	33	16	6	11	45	29	+16	54	Qualification to UEFA Cup first qualifying round (Note: Hajduk Split qualified for the UEFA Cup as a runner-up of the 2007–08 Croatian Football Cup.)
3	Osijek	33	16	6	11	43	34	+9	54	
4	Rijeka	33	14	11	8	53	41	+12	53	Qualification to Intertoto Cup first round
5	Hajduk Split	33	14	10	9	57	41	+16	52	Qualification to UEFA Cup first qualifying round
6	NK Zagreb	33	11	11	11	51	40	+11	44	
7	Varteks	33	11	7	15	46	53	−7	40	
8	Cibalia	33	11	7	15	40	48	−8	40	
9	Zadar	33	11	7	15	49	61	−12	40	
10	Šibenik	33	9	12	12	34	52	−18	39	
11	Inter Zaprešić (O)	33	8	9	16	27	59	−32	33	Qualification to relegation play-off
12	Međimurje (R)	33	3	6	24	37	81	−44	15	Relegation to Croatian Second Football League

Source: Sportnet.hr
Rules for classification: 1st points; 2nd goal difference; 3rd goals scored
For deciding champions, qualification for the UEFA Cup and relegation: 1st points; 2nd head-to-head points; 3rd head-to-head goal difference; 4th head-to-head away goals scored
(C) Champions; (O) Play-off winners; (R) Relegated

== Results ==
The schedule consisted of three rounds. During the first two rounds, each team played each other once home and away for a total of 22 matches. The pairings of the third round were then set according to the standings after the first two rounds, giving every team a third game against each opponent for a total of 33 games per team.

Home \ Away	CIB	DIN	HAJ	INT	MEĐ	OSI	RIJ	SLA	ŠIB	VAR	ZAD	ZAG	CIB	DIN	HAJ	INT	MEĐ	OSI	RIJ	SLA	ŠIB	VAR	ZAD	ZAG
Cibalia		1–2	0–0	2–0	2–0	2–0	2–0	3–0	3–3	1–0	0–2	3–1				1–1	3–0				2–0	0–1		2–2
Dinamo Zagreb	2–1		1–0	5–0	3–1	1–0	1–0	4–0	5–0	1–2	5–1	6–3	4–0			1–0		3–2	6–1	1–0	5–1			
Hajduk Split	2–2	1–2		7–1	3–3	1–0	1–1	1–0	2–0	3–1	4–1	2–1	1–2	1–1		7–2		0–2		2–0	4–1			
Inter Zaprešić	1–0	0–4	0–1		3–0	1–1	0–1	1–0	2–2	0–0	2–1	1–1						1–2	2–1	0–0		1–0		0–0
Međimurje	0–1	1–1	1–1	2–3		0–1	0–1	2–0	2–2	4–1	2–4	0–3		1–2	2–2	4–0					0–1		2–3	
Osijek	5–1	1–3	0–1	1–0	4–0		2–2	1–0	1–1	0–1	1–0	1–1	2–1				3–1		1–0	1–0		2–0		2–1
Rijeka	3–0	2–4	4–0	2–1	3–1	1–1		1–0	2–0	1–1	2–0	2–1	2–0		1–1		5–2					2–2	5–3	1–1
Slaven Belupo	2–2	5–2	2–2	2–0	2–0	2–0	1–0		1–0	6–0	4–2	1–0	2–0				4–0		1–1			2–1	2–0	1–0
Šibenik	2–0	0–2	1–0	1–1	4–2	1–0	3–2	0–2		4–3	0–0	0–0				0–0		1–0	0–0	0–0				0–2
Varteks	2–1	4–3	1–3	1–2	2–0	1–2	1–2	1–1	3–0		2–0	0–1		1–1	4–0		3–2				1–1		5–2	
Zadar	1–1	1–2	0–0	3–0	4–0	5–1	0–0	1–0	2–2	2–0		1–0	1–0	2–5	1–3	3–1		1–1			0–2			
NK Zagreb	4–1	1–3	1–0	3–0	1–1	0–2	2–2	0–2	3–1	0–0	7–2			0–0	2–1		6–1					3–1	0–0	

Source: Sportnet.hr
Legend: Blue = home team win; Yellow = draw; Red = away team win.

=== Relegation play-off ===
Following the end of season, a home-and-away relegation/promotion play-off was contested between Inter Zaprešić (11th placed team in the First League) and Hrvatski Dragovoljac (2nd placed team in the 2007–08 Second Football League). Matches were played on 17 and 21 May 2008, with Inter Zaprešić retaining their top level status by beating Hrvatski Dragovoljac 2–0 on aggregate.

==== First leg ====
17 May 2008

Inter Zaprešić	2–0	Hrvatski Dragovoljac
Gulić 50'; Sivonjić 59'	Report (in Croatian)

Stadion ŠRC Zaprešić, Zaprešić
Attendance: 2,000
Referee: Vlado Svilokos (Sisak)

==== Second leg ====
21 May 2008

Hrvatski Dragovoljac	0–0	Inter Zaprešić
	Report (in Croatian)	Krznar (red card) 33'

Stadion NŠC Stjepan Spajić, Zagreb
Attendance: 1,500
Referee: Draženko Kovačić (Križevci)

== Top goalscorers ==
Rank	Player	Club	Goals
1	(Bosnia and Herzegovina) Želimir Terkeš	Zadar	21
2	(Montenegro) Radomir Đalović	Rijeka	18
3	(Croatia) Nikola Kalinić	Hajduk Split	17
4	(Croatia) Krunoslav Lovrek	NK Zagreb	14
5	(Croatia) Luka Modrić	Dinamo Zagreb	13
6	(Bosnia and Herzegovina) Senijad Ibričić	NK Zagreb	12
6	(Croatia) Željko Malčić	Cibalia	12
6	(Croatia) Mario Mandžukić	Dinamo Zagreb	12
9	(Croatia) Boško Balaban	Dinamo Zagreb	11
9	(Croatia) Anas Sharbini	Rijeka	11
9	(Croatia) Josip Tadić	Dinamo Zagreb	11
9	(Croatia) Ognjen Vukojević	Dinamo Zagreb	11

== Attendances ==
#	Club	Average
1	Dinamo Zagreb	7,165
2	Hajduk	5,088
3	Rijeka	3,294
4	Zadar	3,288
5	Osijek	2,518
6	Varteks	2,406
7	Šibenik	2,375
8	Cibalia	1,906
9	Slaven	1,829
10	Zagreb	1,394
11	Međimurje	1,288
12	Zaprešić	1,244

== See also ==
- 2007–08 Croatian Football Cup
- 2007–08 Croatian Second Football League
