= 2006–07 NK Dinamo Zagreb season =

Dinamo Zagreb
2006–07 season
- Chairman: (Croatia) Mirko Barišić
- Prva HNL: 1st
- Croatian Cup: Winners
- Super Cup: Winners
- UEFA Champions League: Third qualifying round
- UEFA Cup: First round
- Top goalscorer: League: Eduardo da Silva (34); All: Eduardo da Silva (47)
- Highest home attendance: 35,000 v Hajduk Split, 19 May, Prva HNL

This article shows statistics of individual players for the football club Dinamo Zagreb. It also lists all matches that Dinamo Zagreb played in the 2006–07 season.

== Competitions ==
=== Overall ===
Competition	Started round	Current position / round	Final position / round	First match	Last Match
Prva HNL	–	–	1st	29 July	19 May
UEFA Champions League	QR2	–	QR3	25 July	23 August
UEFA Cup	R1	–	R1	14 September	28 September
Croatian Cup	First round	–	Winners	14 September	26 May

=== Prva HNL ===
==== Classification ====
Pos	Team	Pld	W	D	L	GF	GA	GD	Pts	Qualification or relegation
1	Dinamo Zagreb (C)	33	30	2	1	84	22	+62	92	Qualification to Champions League first qualifying round
2	Hajduk Split	33	22	6	5	60	25	+35	72	Qualification to UEFA Cup first qualifying round
3	NK Zagreb	33	18	4	11	57	40	+17	58	Qualification to Intertoto Cup first round
4	Šibenik	33	14	7	12	50	47	+3	49	
5	Slaven Belupo (Note: Qualified for Europe as 2006–07 Croatian Football Cup finalists.)	33	14	7	12	40	37	+3	49	Qualification to UEFA Cup first qualifying round

Source: prva-hnl.hr (in Croatian)
Rules for classification: 1) points; 2) goal difference; 3) number of goals scored.
(C) Champions

==== Results summary ====
Overall								Home						Away					
Pld	W	D	L	GF	GA	GD	Pts	W	D	L	GF	GA	GD	W	D	L	GF	GA	GD
33	30	2	1	84	22	+62	92	17	0	0	46	9	+37	13	2	1	38	13	+25

Last updated: 19 May 2007.
Source: Sportnet.hr

==== Results by round ====
Round	1	2	3	4	5	6	7	8	9	10	11	12	13	14	15	16	17	18	19	20	21	22	23	24	25	26	27	28	29	30	31	32	33
Ground	H	H	A	H	A	H	A	H	A	H	A	A	A	H	A	H	A	H	A	H	A	H	H	A	H	A	H	A	H	A	H	A	H
Result	W	W	W	W	W	W	W	W	D	W	W	D	L	W	W	W	W	W	W	W	W	W	W	W	W	W	W	W	W	W	W	W	W

Updated to match(es) played on 19 May 2007. Source: Competitive matches
A = Away; H = Home; W = Win; D = Draw; L = Loss

== Matches ==
19 Jul Croatian Supercup	Dinamo Zagreb	4–1	Rijeka	Maksimir Stadium
	Eduardo (2), Etto, Modrić			Attendance: 15,000

25 Jul Champions League – QR2	(Lithuania) Ekranas	1–4	Dinamo Zagreb	Aukštaitija Stadium
			Eduardo (2), M. Buljat, Vugrinec

29 Jul 1	Dinamo Zagreb	1–0	Slaven Belupo	Maksimir Stadium
	Vugrinec			Attendance: 8,000

2 Aug Champions League – QR2	Dinamo Zagreb	5–2	Ekranas (Lithuania)	Maksimir Stadium
	Ljubojević (3), Vukojević, Vugrinec

5 Aug 2	Dinamo Zagreb	4–3	Šibenik	Maksimir Stadium
	Eduardo (2), Etto, Modrić			Attendance: 3,000

8 Aug Champions League – QR3	Dinamo Zagreb	0–3	Arsenal (England)	Maksimir Stadium

12 Aug 3	Pula	0–2	Dinamo Zagreb	Stadion Veruda
			Eduardo, Ljubojević	Attendance: 3,500

19 Aug 4	Dinamo Zagreb	4–1	Međimurje	Maksimir Stadium
	Eduardo (2), Ljubojević (2)			Attendance: 10,000

23 Aug Champions League – QR3	Arsenal (England)	2–1	Dinamo Zagreb	Emirates Stadium
			Eduardo

26 Aug 5	Cibalia	0–1	Dinamo Zagreb	Stadion Cibalia
			Eduardo	Attendance: 6,000

9 Sep 6	Dinamo Zagreb	2–0	Kamen Ingrad	Maksimir Stadium
	Agić, Drpić			Attendance: 6,000

14 Sep UEFA Cup – R1	Dinamo Zagreb	1–2	Auxerre (France)	Maksimir Stadium
	Eduardo

16 Sep 7	NK Zagreb	0–3	Dinamo Zagreb	Stadion u Kranjčevićevoj
			Vugrinec, Eduardo, Labudović (o.g.)	Attendance: 7,000

20 Sep Croatian Cup – 1st round	NK Grobničan	0–2	Dinamo Zagreb
			Anderson, Eduardo	Attendance: 2,500

23 Sep 8	Dinamo Zagreb	1–0	Rijeka	Maksimir Stadium
	Vugrinec			Attendance: 2,000

28 Sep UEFA Cup – R1	Auxerre (France)	3–1	Dinamo Zagreb	Stade de l'Abbé-Deschamps
			Eduardo

30 Sep 9	Hajduk Split	2–2	Dinamo Zagreb	Poljud Stadium
			Eduardo, Vugrinec	Attendance: 30,000

14 Oct 10	Dinamo Zagreb	4–1	Varteks	Maksimir Stadium
	Vugrinec (3), Eduardo			Attendance: 5,000

21 Oct 11	Osijek	0–4	Dinamo Zagreb	Gradski vrt
			Eduardo, Drpić (2), M. Cvitanović	Attendance: 7,000

25 Oct Croatian Cup – 2nd round	Dinamo Zagreb	3–0	Šibenik	Maksimir Stadium
	Eduardo (2), Anderson

28 Oct 12	Slaven Belupo	1–1	Dinamo Zagreb	Gradski Stadion u Koprivnici
			Ćorluka	Attendance: 5,000

4 Nov 13	Šibenik	2–1	Dinamo Zagreb	Stadion Šubićevac
			Modrić	Attendance: 4,000

8 Nov 14	Dinamo Zagreb	5–1	Pula	Maksimir Stadium
	M. Buljat, M. Cvitanović, Eduardo (2), Anderson			Attendance: 3,500

11 Nov 15	Međimurje	2–3	Dinamo Zagreb	Stadion SRC Mladost
			Pandev, Eduardo, Ćorluka	Attendance: 4,500

18 Nov 16	Dinamo Zagreb	4–0	Cibalia	Maksimir Stadium
	Eduardo (3), Vugrinec			Attendance: 2,000

22 Nov Croatian Cup – Quarterfinal	Dinamo Zagreb	2–1	Inter Zaprešić	Maksimir Stadium
	Eduardo, Drpić

25 Nov 17	Kamen Ingrad	0–2	Dinamo Zagreb	Stadion Kamen Ingrad
			Vugrinec, Eduardo	Attendance: 2,000

28 Nov Croatian Cup – Quarterfinal	Dinamo Zagreb	2–1	Inter Zaprešić	Maksimir Stadium
	Eduardo, Vugrinec

2 Dec 18	Dinamo Zagreb	2–1	NK Zagreb	Maksimir Stadium
	Eduardo, Modrić			Attendance: 4,500

17 Feb 19	Rijeka	2–3	Dinamo Zagreb	Kantrida Stadium
			Eduardo (2), Modrić	Attendance: 8,000

24 Feb 20	Dinamo Zagreb	2–1	Hajduk Split	Maksimir Stadium
	Eduardo (2)			Attendance: 30,000

3 Mar 21	Varteks	1–3	Dinamo Zagreb	Stadion Varteks
			Vugrinec (2), Tadić	Attendance: 6,000

10 March 22	Dinamo Zagreb	1–0	Osijek	Maksimir Stadium
	Tadić			Attendance: 4,000

14 March Croatian Cup – Semifinal	Dinamo Zagreb	1–0	Hajduk Split	Maksimir Stadium
	Vugrinec

17 Mar 23	Dinamo Zagreb	1–0	Rijeka	Maksimir Stadium
	Eduardo			Attendance: 5,000

31 Mar 24	Varteks	2–3	Dinamo Zagreb	Stadion Varteks
			Vugrinec, Eduardo (2)	Attendance: 5,000

4 April Croatian Cup – Semifinal	Hajduk Split	2–2	Dinamo Zagreb	Poljud Stadium
			Modrić, Tadić

7 Apr 25	Dinamo Zagreb	1–0	Osijek	Maksimir Stadium
	Tadić			Attendance: 7,000

14 Apr 26	Pula	1–2	Dinamo Zagreb	Stadion Veruda
			Schildenfeld, Drpić	Attendance: 3,500

18 Apr 27	Dinamo Zagreb	4–0	Cibalia	Maksimir Stadium
	Eduardo (2), Carlos, Ćorluka			Attendance: 2,500

21 Apr 28	Kamen Ingrad	0–1	Dinamo Zagreb	Stadion Kamen Ingrad
			Modrić	Attendance: 3,500

28 Apr 29	Dinamo Zagreb	4–1	Međimurje	Maksimir Stadium
	Modrić, Mikić, Ćorluka, Štefulj (o.g.)			Attendance: 2,500

2 May 30	Slaven Belupo	0–3	Dinamo Zagreb	Gradski Stadion u Koprivnici
			Eduardo (2), Sammir	Attendance: 3,000

5 May 31	Dinamo Zagreb	3–0	Šibenik	Maksimir Stadium
	Mikić (2), Tadić			Attendance: 1,000

9 May Croatian Cup – Final	Dinamo Zagreb	1–0	Slaven Belupo	Maksimir Stadium
	Eduardo

12 May 32	NK Zagreb	0–4	Dinamo Zagreb	Stadion u Kranjčevićevoj
			Tadić, Drpić, Eduardo (2)	Attendance: 6,500

19 May 33	Dinamo Zagreb	3–0	Hajduk Split	Maksimir Stadium
	Eduardo (3)			Attendance: 35,000

26 May Croatian Cup – Final	Slaven Belupo	1–1	Dinamo Zagreb	Gradski Stadion u Koprivnici
			Schildenfeld

== Player seasonal records ==
Competitive matches only. Updated to games played 26 May 2007.

=== Goalscorers ===
Rank	Name	League	Cup	Europe	Supercup	Total
1	(Croatia) Eduardo da Silva	34	6	5	2	47
2	(Croatia) Davor Vugrinec	12	2	2	–	16
3	(Croatia) Luka Modrić	6	1	–	1	8
4	(Croatia) Dino Drpić	5	1	–	–	6
4	(Croatia) Goran Ljubojević	3	–	3	–	6
4	(Croatia) Josip Tadić	5	1	–	–	6
7	(Croatia) Vedran Ćorluka	4	–	–	–	4
8	(Brazil) Anderson Costa	1	2	–	–	3
8	(Croatia) Mihael Mikić	3	–	–	–	3
10	(Croatia) Marijan Buljat	1	–	1	–	2
10	(Croatia) Mario Cvitanović	2	–	–	–	2
10	(Brazil) Etto	1	–	–	1	2
10	(Croatia) Gordon Schildenfeld	1	1	–	–	2
14	(Croatia) Jasmin Agić	1	–	–	–	1
14	(Brazil) Carlos	1	–	–	–	1
14	(North Macedonia) Saško Pandev	1	–	–	–	1
14	(Brazil) Sammir	1	–	–	–	1
14	(Croatia) Ognjen Vukojević	–	–	1	–	1

Source: Competitive matches
