= 2007 Croatian Football Cup final =

- Event: 2006–07 Croatian Cup
Dinamo Zagreb	Slaven Belupo
2	1

First leg
Dinamo Zagreb	Slaven Belupo
1	0
- Date: 9 May 2007
- Venue: Stadion Maksimir, Zagreb
- Man of the Match: Eduardo (Dinamo Zagreb)
- Referee: Ante Vučemilović (Osijek)
- Attendance: 6,000
- Weather: Cloudy

Second leg
Slaven Belupo	Dinamo Zagreb
1	1
- Date: 26 May 2007
- Venue: Gradski stadion, Koprivnica
- Man of the Match: Luka Modrić (Dinamo Zagreb)
- Referee: Ivan Bebek (Rijeka)
- Attendance: 5,000
- Weather: Clear

The 2007 Croatian Cup final was a two-legged affair played between Dinamo Zagreb and Slaven Belupo. The first leg was played in Zagreb on 9 May 2007, while the second leg was on 26 May 2007 in Koprivnica.

Dinamo Zagreb won the trophy with an aggregate result of 2–1.

== Road to the final ==
Dinamo Zagreb		Round	Slaven Belupo	
Opponent	Result		Opponent	Result
Grobničan	2–0	First round	Koprivnica	2–0
Šibenik	3–0	Second round	Hrvace	4–2
Inter Zaprešić	2–1	Quarter-finals	NK Zagreb	6–0
Inter Zaprešić	2–1	Quarter-finals	NK Zagreb	3–2
Hajduk Split	1–0	Semi-finals	Rijeka	0–0
Hajduk Split	2–2	Semi-finals	Rijeka	3–2

== First leg ==
9 May 2007
20:15 CET

Dinamo Zagreb	1–0	Slaven Belupo
Eduardo 76' (pen.)	Report (in Croatian)

Stadion Maksimir, Zagreb
Attendance: 6,000
Referee: Ante Vučemilović (Osijek)

DINAMO ZAGREB:
GK	12	(Croatia) Filip Lončarić
DF	5	(Croatia) Vedran Ćorluka
DF	15	(Brazil) Carlos
DF	23	(Croatia) Gordon Schildenfeld
DF	26	(Croatia) Dino Drpić
MF	6	(Croatia) Nikola Pokrivač	(substituted off) 65'
MF	10	(Croatia) Luka Modrić
MF	14	(Croatia) Mihael Mikić	(substituted off) 53'
MF	18	(Brazil) Sammir	(substituted off) 83'
MF	20	(Croatia) Ognjen Vukojević
FW	24	(Croatia) Eduardo (c)
Substitutes:
FW	11	(Croatia) Josip Tadić	(substituted on) 53'
MF	8	(Croatia) Ante Tomić	(substituted on) 65'
MF	4	(Croatia) Dario Jertec	(substituted on) 83'
Manager:
(Croatia) Branko Ivanković

SLAVEN BELUPO:
GK	12	(North Macedonia) Jane Nikoloski	(yellow card) 80'
DF	2	(Croatia) Petar Bošnjak
DF	3	(Croatia) Matija Kristić
DF	5	(Croatia) Dario Bodrušić		(substituted off) 79'
DF	27	(Bosnia and Herzegovina) Ivan Radeljić
MF	7	(Croatia) Dalibor Poldrugač
MF	10	(Croatia) Miljenko Mumlek (c)		(substituted off) 83'
MF	13	(Croatia) Željko Sopić	(yellow card) 72'
FW	17	(Croatia) Bojan Vručina
MF	30	(Croatia) Srebrenko Posavec	(yellow card) 28'
FW	11	(Croatia) Dario Zahora	(yellow card) 18'	(substituted off) 68'
Substitutes:
MF	15	(Croatia) Stjepan Poljak		(substituted on) 68'
MF	22	(Croatia) Danijel Radiček		(substituted on) 79'
MF	23	(Croatia) Krunoslav Jambrušić		(substituted on) 83'
Manager:
(Croatia) Elvis Scoria

Assistant referees:
Dalibor Conjar (Osijek)
Tomislav Šetka (Đakovo)

Match rules

- 90 minutes.
- Seven named substitutes.
- Maximum of three substitutions.

== Second leg ==
26 May 2007
20:15 CET

Slaven Belupo	1–1	Dinamo Zagreb
Mumlek 68' (pen.)	Report (in Croatian)	Schildenfeld 89'

Gradski stadion, Koprivnica
Attendance: 5,000
Referee: Ivan Bebek (Rijeka)

SLAVEN BELUPO:
GK	12	(North Macedonia) Jane Nikoloski	(yellow card) 90'
DF	2	(Croatia) Petar Bošnjak	(yellow card) 21'
DF	3	(Croatia) Matija Kristić
DF	5	(Croatia) Dario Bodrušić
DF	27	(Bosnia and Herzegovina) Ivan Radeljić	(yellow card) 42'
MF	7	(Croatia) Dalibor Poldrugač
MF	10	(Croatia) Miljenko Mumlek (c)
MF	13	(Croatia) Željko Sopić
MF	15	(Croatia) Stjepan Poljak	(yellow card) 84'
MF	30	(Croatia) Srebrenko Posavec
FW	17	(Croatia) Bojan Vručina
Manager:
(Croatia) Elvis Scoria

DINAMO ZAGREB:
GK	12	(Croatia) Filip Lončarić
DF	5	(Croatia) Vedran Ćorluka
DF	15	(Brazil) Carlos
DF	23	(Croatia) Gordon Schildenfeld	(yellow card) 90'
DF	26	(Croatia) Dino Drpić
MF	6	(Croatia) Nikola Pokrivač		(substituted off) 70'
MF	8	(Croatia) Ante Tomić	(yellow card) 42'	(substituted off) 64'
MF	10	(Croatia) Luka Modrić
MF	18	(Brazil) Sammir	(yellow card) 42'	(substituted off) 87'
MF	20	(Croatia) Ognjen Vukojević	(yellow card) 63'
FW	24	(Croatia) Eduardo (c)
Substitutes:
MF	14	(Croatia) Mihael Mikić		(substituted on) 64'
FW	11	(Croatia) Josip Tadić		(substituted on) 70'
MF	4	(Croatia) Dario Jertec		(substituted on) 87'
Manager:
(Croatia) Branko Ivanković

Assistant referees:
Željko Grgec (Bistra)
Damir Volf (Rijeka)

Match rules

- 90 minutes.
- Penalty shoot-out if scores still level; no extra time.
- Seven named substitutes.
- Maximum of three substitutions.
