= Petar Bošnjak =

Croatian footballer

Personal information
- Full name: Petar Bošnjak
- Date of birth: 12 June 1974 (age 52)
- Place of birth: Virovitica, SFR Yugoslavia
- Height: 1.78 m (5 ft 10 in)
- Position: Defender

Youth career
- 1981–1992: Mladost Ždralovi

Senior career*
| Years | Team | Apps | (Gls) |
| 1992–1993 | Mladost Ždralovi | | |
| 1993–1995 | Bjelovar | | |
| 1995–1998 | Mladost 127 | 70 | (11) |
| 1999–2008 | Slaven Belupo | 211 | (10) |
| 2009–2011 | Mladost Ždralovi | | |
| 2011–2014 | Bilogorac Veliko Trojstvo | | |
- * Club domestic league appearances and goals as of 19 May 2007

Petar Bošnjak (born 12 June 1974) is a Croatian retired football defender.

He retired from professional football in January 2009, after 10 years in Slaven Belupo, continuing his career in lower-league football clubs of his home county.
