= Luka Modrić =

Croatian footballer (born 1985)

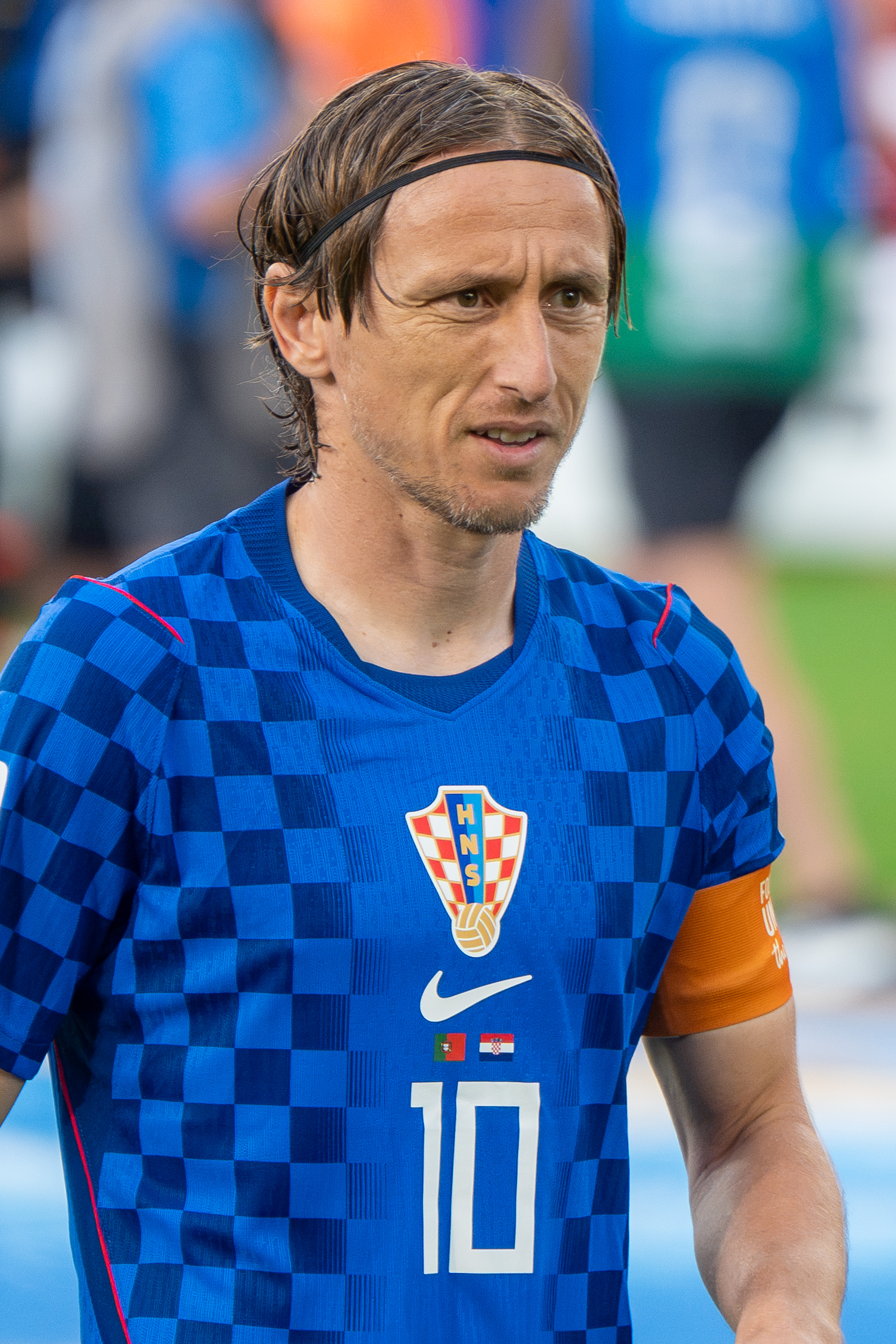
- Modrić with Croatia at the 2026 FIFA World Cup

Personal information
- Full name: Luka Modrić
- Date of birth: 9 September 1985 (age 41)
- Place of birth: Zadar, SR Croatia, SFR Yugoslavia
- Height: 1.72 m (5 ft 8 in)
- Position: Central midfielder

Team information
- Current team: AC Milan
- Number: 14

Youth career
- 1996–2000: Zadar
- 2000–2003: Dinamo Zagreb

Senior career*
Years	Team	Apps	(Gls)
2003–2008	Dinamo Zagreb	94	(26)
2003–2004	→ Zrinjski Mostar (loan)	25	(8)
2004–2005	→ Inter Zaprešić (loan)	18	(4)
2008–2012	Tottenham Hotspur	127	(13)
2012–2025	Real Madrid	394	(30)
2025–	AC Milan	46	(2)

International career^{‡}
2001	Croatia U15	2	(0)
2001	Croatia U17	2	(0)
2003	Croatia U18	7	(0)
2003–2004	Croatia U19	11	(1)
2004–2005	Croatia U21	15	(2)
2006–	Croatia	208	(30)
Medal record
Men's football
Representing Croatia
FIFA World Cup
Runner-up	2018 Russia
Third place	2022 Qatar
UEFA Nations League
Runner-up	2023 Netherlands
- * Club domestic league appearances and goals as of 22:14, 22 November 2026 (UTC) ‡ National team caps and goals as of 15 November 2026 (UTC)

Luka Modrić (Croatian pronunciation: [lûːka mǒːdritɕ]; born 9 September 1985) is a Croatian professional footballer who plays as a central midfielder for Serie A club AC Milan and captains the Croatia national team. He is widely regarded as one of the greatest midfielders of all time and as the greatest Croatian footballer in history. With 34 major trophies, he is the most decorated Croatian player in world football. His career longevity ranks him joint-second globally for all-time international appearances and among the players with the highest number of official matches ever played, making him the first and only Croatian to reach the 1,150-appearance milestone.

Modrić began his career with Croatian club Dinamo Zagreb from 2003 to 2008 – intermittently on loan to Zrinjski Mostar and Inter Zaprešić – winning six domestic trophies. He moved to Tottenham Hotspur in 2008, leading them to UEFA Champions League qualification in 2010, the club's first qualification in almost 50 years. Modrić joined Real Madrid for a £30 million transfer fee in 2012. He won the 2013–14 Champions League title and was named in the squad of the season. Modrić was a key member of the team's three consecutive Champions League titles from 2015–16 to 2017–18, named to the squad of the season each time. In total, he won 28 major trophies with the club, including six UEFA Champions League titles, four La Liga titles, and two Copa del Rey titles, making him Real Madrid's all-time most decorated footballer. He joined AC Milan in 2025 on a free transfer.

Since his international debut in 2006, Modrić has led the nation's "second Golden Generation" of players. He has participated in every major tournament Croatia has qualified for, including every UEFA European Championship from 2008 to 2024, as well as the 2006, 2014, 2018, 2022 and 2026 FIFA World Cup. At Euro 2008, he was named in the Team of the Tournament. Modrić led Croatia to a second and third-place finish at the 2018 and 2022 World Cup respectively, securing two World Cup medals. He individually won the Golden Ball as the tournament's best player in 2018, later winning the Bronze Ball as the tournament's third-best player in 2022. Modrić similarly led the team to a silver medal in the 2023 UEFA Nations League.

Throughout his career, Modrić has won numerous individual awards, culminating in the Ballon d'Or in 2018, making him the first player other than Lionel Messi or Cristiano Ronaldo to win the award since 2007. He has been named Croatian Footballer of the Year a record fourteen times between 2007 and 2025. Modrić received the Best FIFA Men's Player Award, the UEFA Men's Player of the Year Award, and the IFFHS World's Best Playmaker award in 2018. He has been named in the FIFPRO World 11 six times and in the UEFA Team of the Year three times. In 2019, he was awarded the Golden Foot for his personality and career legacy.

== Early life ==
Luka Modrić was born on 9 September 1985 in Zadar and was raised in the hamlet of Modrići, which is a part of Zaton Obrovački, a village situated on the southern slopes of the mountain Velebit, north of the city of Zadar in SR Croatia, then a republic within SFR Yugoslavia. He is the oldest child of Stipe Modrić from Modrići and Radojka Dopuđ from Kruševo near Obrovac, both of whom initially worked in a knitwear factory. Modrić mostly spent his early years in the stone house where his paternal grandfather usually lived after whom he was named, located on the road above the hamlet of Modrići, and was shepherding goats as a five-year-old.

His childhood coincided with the Croatian War of Independence—in 1991, when the war escalated, his family were forced to flee the area. Modrić's grandfather Luka was executed by Serb rebels who were part of the police of SAO Krajina in December 1991 near his house in Modrići, and after the family fled, the house was burned to the ground. Modrić became a refugee and lived with his family in the Hotel Kolovare for seven years; he later moved to the Hotel Iž, both in Zadar. His father joined the Croatian Army as an aeromechanic. In those years, thousands of bombs fell on the city and football was a way to escape the reality of war. He recalls it as a tough time for his family and something which shaped him as a person. He said he was mostly unaware of the war because he befriended many other children and their parents did not let it affect their childhood.

In these difficult circumstances, Modrić began playing football, mostly at the hotel parking lot. In 1992, he simultaneously entered the primary school and a sporting academy, the latter paid for with the little money the family had, sometimes helped by Modrić's uncle. As a boy he was inspired to play football by Zvonimir Boban and Francesco Totti.

== Club career ==
=== Early years ===
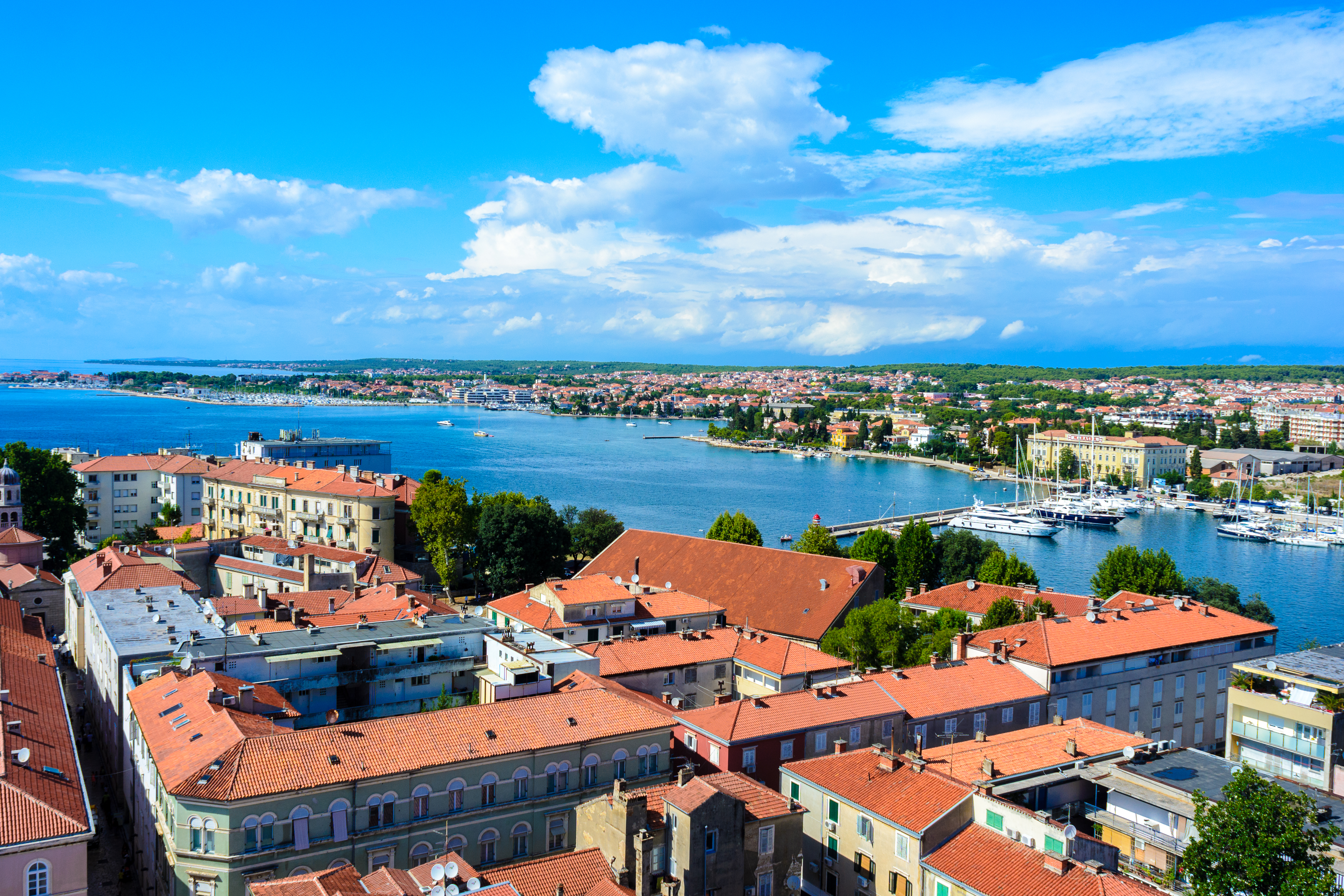
Modrić began his youth career at NK Zadar in the city of Zadar.

Supported by his family, Modrić participated in representative camps and trained at NK Zadar. He was under the tutelage of coach Domagoj Bašić and the head of the youth academy, Tomislav Bašić. Tomislav Bašić, considered by Modrić as his "sporting father", said Modrić's father made him wooden shin guards because they had little money. However, Modrić later denied the story. Due to being considered too young and light, he was not signed by Croatian powerhouse Hajduk Split, the most representative football club in the region of Dalmatia. After displaying some talent, including at a youth tournament in Italy, Tomislav Bašić arranged Modrić's move to Dinamo Zagreb when Modrić was a 16-year-old in late 2001. After a season with Dinamo Zagreb's youth side, Modrić was loaned in 2003 to Zrinjski Mostar in the Bosnian Premier League. During this period, he established his versatile style of play and became the Bosnian Premier League Player of the Year at only the age of 18. Modrić later said, "Someone who can play in the Bosnian Premier League can play anywhere," referring to its physical nature. The following year, he was loaned to Croatian side Inter Zaprešić. He spent one season there, helping the team to achieve second position in the Prva HNL and a place in the preliminary round of the UEFA Cup. He also won the Croatian Football Hope of the Year award in 2004. He returned to Dinamo Zagreb in 2005.

=== Dinamo Zagreb ===
In the 2005–06 season, Modrić signed a ten-year contract (his first long-term contract) with Dinamo Zagreb. With the contract's earnings, he bought a flat in Zadar for his family. He secured a place in Dinamo's first team, contributing 7 goals in 31 matches to help win the league. In the 2006–07 season, Dinamo again won the league, with Modrić making a similar contribution. He was the main provider for striker Eduardo, which helped Modrić win the Prva HNL Player of the Year award. The following season, Modrić as a team captain, led Dinamo's attempt to qualify for the 2007–08 UEFA Cup. In the final play-off stage, Modrić converted a penalty in the second and away fixture against Ajax; the match finished 1–1 after regular time. Dinamo won the match and play-off with a score of 3–2 after extra time with two goals from teammate Mario Mandžukić. However, Dinamo Zagreb failed to advance beyond the group stage. In his last home match with the club at Maksimir Stadium, Modrić was given a standing ovation and fans held up supportive banners. He finished his four-year tenure at Dinamo with a tally of over 31 goals and 29 assists in four league seasons, contributing most notably in the 2007–08 season when Dinamo won the second Croatian Cup and became champions by a 28-point margin. Modrić was courted by Barcelona, Arsenal and Chelsea, but opted to wait leaving the club.

=== Tottenham Hotspur ===
==== 2008–2010: Struggle and success in England ====
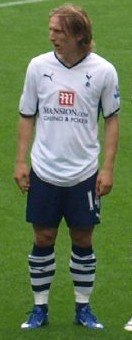
Modrić lining up for Tottenham Hotspur in August 2008

Modrić agreed to transfer terms with Tottenham Hotspur on 26 April 2008. He was the first of many summer signings for manager Juande Ramos, and was also the Premier League's first summer transfer. Club chairman Daniel Levy promptly flew to Zagreb when Manchester City and Newcastle United became interested, and after signing a six-year contract, Tottenham confirmed the transfer fee paid was £16.5 million, equalling the club's record fee set by Darren Bent's move in 2007. He got the number 14 jersey, later recalling that he wore it in honour of Johan Cruyff. Modrić made his competitive Premier League debut on 16 August in a 2–1 defeat to Middlesbrough at the Riverside Stadium in Spurs' first match of the 2008–09 season.

Modrić had a slow start at Tottenham. He suffered from a knee injury early in his tenure and was labelled as a light-weight for the Premier League by sections of the media, as well as Arsenal manager Arsène Wenger. Reflecting on that, Modrić said that such "critics push you forward to show people they are wrong. Maybe I look lightweight but I am a really strong person mentally and physically, and I never had any problems with my size". This coincided with his poor form, leading to concerns both for himself and Croatia national team head coach Slaven Bilić. Modrić spent his early days at the number 10 position, before being shifted to the left wing to play alongside Wilson Palacios. Spurs teammate Tom Huddlestone later said, "[H]is versatility was probably a blessing and a curse, he was that good that he had to play out of position for a bit."

After the appointment of manager Harry Redknapp, Modrić was given a more familiar role as a central or left-sided midfielder, allowing him to have more influence on the team and use his footballing talent more productively, for example in a 4–4 draw with arch-rivals Arsenal on 29 October. Redknapp recognised Modrić's value to his side and planned to shape his new team around the Croatian playmaker. He scored his first competitive goal at Tottenham in a 2–2 draw against Spartak Moscow during the UEFA Cup group stages on 18 December 2008. He scored his first Premier League goals against Newcastle United in an away defeat on 21 December, a home win in the third round of the FA Cup against Wigan Athletic on 2 January 2009, and in an away defeat against Manchester United on 25 April 2009. Using Modrić in his former position from his Dinamo days made him more effective with performances against Stoke City, Hull City, and most notably on 21 March when he scored the only goal in a win against Chelsea.

Before the 2009–10 season, Redknapp said of Modrić, "[He's] a hell of a player and a manager's dream, so I am told. He trains like a demon and never complains, will work with and without the ball on the field and can beat a defender with a trick or with a pass. He could get into any team in the top four". On 29 August 2009, during Tottenham's 2–1 win over Birmingham City, Modrić was taken off injured with a suspected calf injury. The following day, it was confirmed Modrić had sustained a fracture to his right fibula and was expected to be out for six weeks. He returned on 28 December in the London derby against West Ham United, which Spurs won 2–0 with an 11th-minute goal scored by Modrić using the leg he had broken. He again scored in a home win against Everton on 28 February 2010, and in an away defeat against Burnley on 9 May. On 30 May 2010, Modrić signed a new six-year contract that ran until 2016. Upon signing, he said, "Tottenham Hotspur gave me my chance in the Premier League and I want to go on to achieve great success here with them. Yes, there have been enquiries from other big clubs, but I have no interest in going anywhere. Last season's top-four finish was an indication of where we are as a club and I feel I can continue to improve and go on to achieve everything I want to at Spurs."

==== 2010–2012: Final seasons in England ====
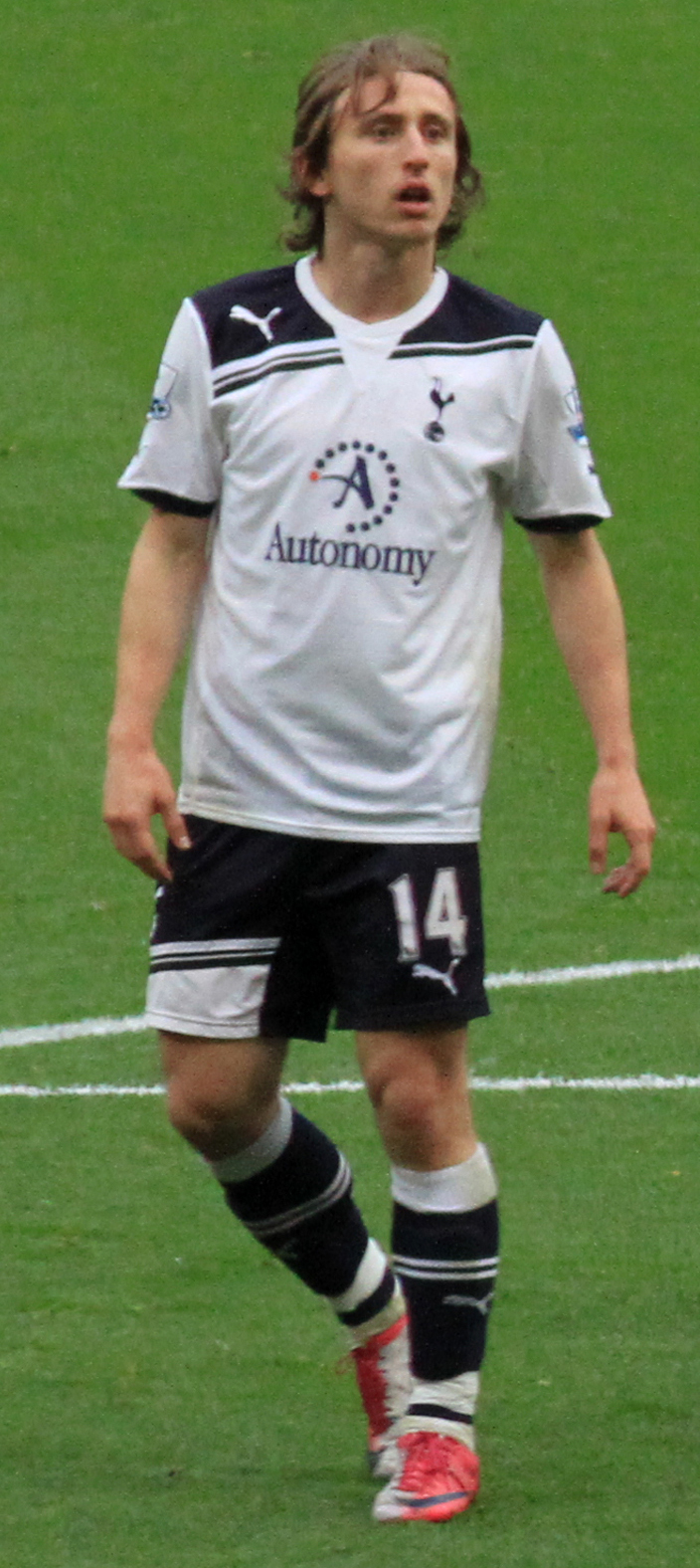
Modrić playing against Arsenal in November 2010

On 11 September 2010, Modrić scored his first goal of the 2010–11 season in a 1–1 away draw at West Bromwich Albion. On 28 November, in a home match against Liverpool, Modrić scored a goal that was later credited as an own goal by Martin Škrtel. After a draw against Manchester United at White Hart Lane in January 2011, Redknapp praised Modrić, saying, "He was unbelievable. Magnificent. He's an amazing footballer, the little man takes the ball in the tightest areas with people around him, wriggling out of situations. He could play in any team in the world." Modrić also scored in Tottenham's 3–2 victory over Stoke City on 9 April, and converted a penalty at Anfield on 15 May in a 2–0 victory over Liverpool. Modrić helped Tottenham reach their first involvement in the UEFA Champions League. In the first match, against Inter Milan at the San Siro on 20 October, he exited the match early due to injury; Spurs lost 4–3, despite the tremendous efforts of Gareth Bale. On the return match at home, on 2 November, Modrić was given too much space to move and dictate the tempo of the match. He created and assisted for the first goal by Rafael van der Vaart in a 3–1 victory. In the next match, against Werder Bremen, Modrić scored the second goal. After a scoreless draw against Milan, Spurs were eliminated from the competition in the quarter-finals by Real Madrid.

Modrić played 32 Premier League matches in the 2010–11 season, scoring three goals, recording two assists and making the highest average number of passes per match for Spurs with 62.5 and an accuracy rate of 87.4%. At the end of the season, Modrić was voted the Tottenham Hotspur Player of the Year. Then-Manchester United manager Sir Alex Ferguson said he would have chosen Modrić as his Player of the Year for that season.

"I spent four great years there with a lot of emotions, with a lot of love from the club and the fans. I enjoyed every moment with Tottenham. But in one moment you feel you need to take a step forward, to go to a higher level. I think it was the right time for me to go, but I will always be thankful to Tottenham for everything they did for me. I became a better player there and they pushed me to this level where I am at the moment."

— Luka Modrić reflecting on the negotiations with Chelsea and the move to Real Madrid in February 2014.

In mid-2011, Modrić was heavily pursued by Tottenham's London rivals Chelsea, who made a first bid of £22 million, which they increased to £27 million, both of which were rejected by Spurs chairman Daniel Levy. After the failed bids, Modrić announced he would welcome a move across London and that he had a "gentleman's agreement" with Levy the club would entertain offers from a "big club". Speculation continued throughout the summer transfer window, culminating in Modrić refusing to play in Tottenham's opening match of the 2011–12 season against Manchester United, which ended in a 3–0 loss. Modrić said his "head was not in the right place" as he continued to force a move to Chelsea. On the final day of the transfer window, Chelsea made an offer of £40 million that was again rejected.

After failing to secure a transfer, Spurs manager Harry Redknapp told Modrić to focus on his playing and named him as a starter. On 18 September, he scored his first goal of the season for Tottenham with a shot from 23 m (25 yd) in a 4–0 home win against Liverpool. On 14 January 2012, Modrić scored the only goal in a home draw with Wolverhampton Wanderers. On 31 January in a 3–1 win against Wigan Athletic, he assisted for the first goal with a crossfield pass and scored the second from 18 m (20 yd). For the third time that season, he was included in "Team of the Week". Modrić scored his last goal for Tottenham on 2 May in a 1–4 away win against Bolton Wanderers with a powerful volley from 23 m (25 yd).

=== Real Madrid ===
==== 2012–13: Becoming a starter at Real Madrid ====
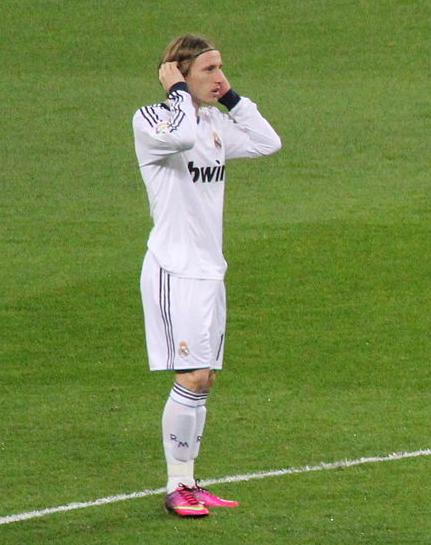
Modrić playing against Sevilla in February 2013

On 27 August 2012, Real Madrid announced they had agreed on a deal with Tottenham for an approximate £30 million transfer fee. Modrić signed a five-year contract with the Spanish club. Two days later, he made his Real Madrid debut against Barcelona in the second leg final of the 2012 Supercopa de España at the Santiago Bernabéu Stadium, replacing Mesut Özil in the 83rd minute. Madrid won the match, giving Modrić his first trophy with the club 36 hours after his signing was announced. Despite his positive debut, Modrić at first struggled to settle into the team under manager José Mourinho because of his lack of pre-season training, which he missed as a result of his ongoing transfer negotiations. The presence of veteran midfielders Xabi Alonso and Sami Khedira in defensive midfield, and Özil in offensive midfield, usually kept Modrić out of the starting line-up, limiting him to substitute appearances. He mostly played out-of-position for his first few months at the club. He played his first UEFA Champions League match for Real Madrid in the group stage against Manchester City on 18 September, which Madrid won 3–2. On 3 November, Modrić scored his first goal for Real Madrid in the last minute of their 4–0 victory over Real Zaragoza in La Liga. His most notable match that year was on 4 December, when he assisted for the first two goals of Cristiano Ronaldo and José Callejón with cross-field passes in a 4–1 victory over Ajax in the group stage of the Champions League. At the end of the year he was voted as the worst signing of the season by Spanish newspaper Marca.

Modrić started in Real Madrid's home match against rivals Barcelona on 2 March 2013. From a corner kick, he assisted Sergio Ramos to score the winning goal in the 82nd minute, giving Real a victory in El Clásico. On 5 March, Modrić came on as a second-half substitute during the decisive Champions League knockout leg against ten-man Manchester United at Old Trafford. With Madrid behind by a goal, Modrić equalised with a long-range shot from 23 m (25 yd) out and played a key role in the rest of the match, which Real Madrid won 2–1, advancing them to the quarter-finals 3–2 on aggregate. This match is often seen as the turning point in Modrić's career in Real Madrid. On 16 March, he replicated this performance against Mallorca, giving Real Madrid the lead with a long-range volley from 27 m (30 yd); Real Madrid won the match 5–2. Modrić played as a starter in both Champions League semi-final matches against Borussia Dortmund. In the first leg on 24 April, he played in the attacking midfield position where he did not influence the match and the team lost 4–1. On 30 April, in the second leg 2–0 victory, Modrić played as the deep-lying playmaker, making passes to the attackers and creating several chances; he was among the best-rated players that night. From March 2013, Modrić's form and influence in the midfield continued to improve, distinguishing himself as a player with most passes completed in his team. On 8 May, he assisted from the corner for the first goal and scored the fourth goal in a 6–2 victory over Málaga.

==== 2013–2015: Best midfielder in Spain and La Décima ====
"He's the head of midfield in a complicated environment. Every day in Madrid pressure is coming at you from all sides. Modrić not only withstands the pressure but has grown among it to be Madrid's best player, with [Cristiano] Ronaldo."

— Predrag Mijatović praises Modrić's rising performance and significance for the team in January 2014.

With the arrival of new manager Carlo Ancelotti, Modrić became one of the most frequent starters in the team, being partnered in midfield with Xabi Alonso to provide a balance of defence and attack. He was consistently the team's most efficient passer, averaging 90% accuracy in La Liga, and also having the most ball recoveries among the squad. He scored his first goal of the 2013–14 season in the last Champions League group match against Copenhagen, making it his fifth goal for the club, all five of which were scored from the outside the penalty area. Modrić scored his first goal of the Liga season in a 3–0 away win against Getafe, his sixth goal outside the penalty area. Modrić was on the pitch when Real Madrid won the 2013–14 Copa del Rey after defeating Barcelona 2–1 in the final.

In the first leg of the Champions League quarter-finals, Modrić intercepted the ball and assisted Cristiano Ronaldo for the third goal in Real Madrid's 3–0 home victory against Borussia Dortmund. The goal was ultimately decisive because Real went on to lose 2–0 in the second leg, but progressed with a marginal aggregate score of 3–2. In his 100th appearance for the club, Modrić assisted for the first goal in the second leg 4–0 victory over Bayern Munich in the Champions League semi-final, helping Real Madrid reach the final for the first time in 12 years. He was included in UEFA's Team of the Week for both legs of the semi-final. On 24 May in the final, Modrić again assisted from a corner for teammate Sergio Ramos, who scored a 93rd-minute equaliser against local rivals Atlético Madrid. Real won 4–1 in extra time, marking the club's tenth Champions League title, locally known as La Décima (lit. 'the Tenth'). He was included in the UEFA Champions League Team of the Season and received the LFP award for the "Best Midfielder" of the Spanish first division for that season.

In August 2014, Modrić signed a new contract to stay at Real Madrid until 2018. With the departure of Alonso he was partnered with newly arrived Toni Kroos. Real Madrid began the 2014–15 season by winning the UEFA Super Cup over Sevilla Modrić assisted twice for Bale, first against Real Sociedad in La Liga, and second against Basel in the Champions League. In the 2–0 away win against Villarreal, Modrić scored his seventh goal from outside of the box.

In late November, Modrić sustained a thigh injury during an international match against Italy, because of which he did not play for three months. He returned in early March 2015, starting in seven matches and proving his form. On 21 April, in the 3–1 home win against Málaga, he strained ligaments in his right knee, because of which he did not play until May. With his injury, Real Madrid's 22-match winning run in the season came to an end. His absence and the lack of a quality substitute were seen as the main cause of Real Madrid's failure to win matches in La Liga and the Champions League. Ancelotti said, "Modrić has missed most of the year and this has hurt us." Modrić's influence was recognised and he was selected by professional players in the FIFA FIFPro World XI.

==== 2015–2017: Among the world's best players and La Undécima and Duodécima ====
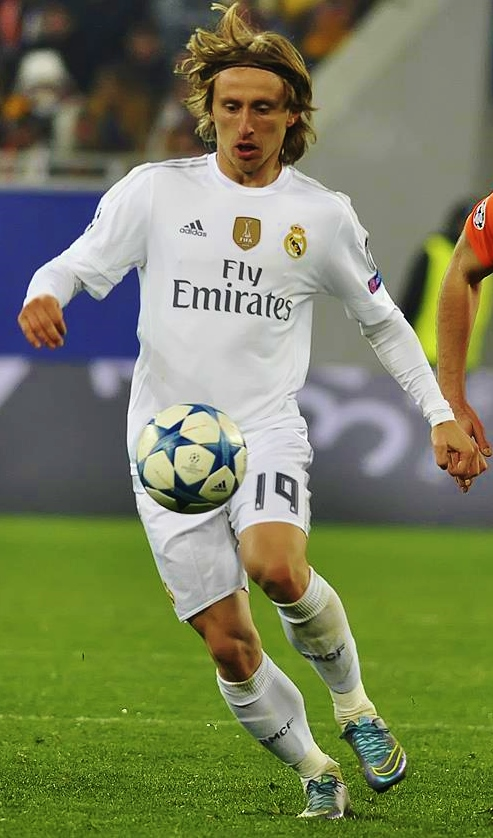
Modrić playing against Shakhtar Donetsk during their group stage match in the UEFA Champions League in November 2015

For the 2015–16 season, Carlo Ancelotti was replaced by Rafael Benítez under whom Modrić continued to be a key midfield player. He sustained a muscular groin injury during an international match against Bulgaria in October, initially suggesting an absence of two-to-three weeks. However, by 20 October, he had recovered in time for the match against Paris Saint-Germain.

With the arrival of new manager Zinedine Zidane in January 2016, the relationship between them was noted in the media, with Modrić described as "master of the game", and the crucial "connector" of the defence and attack. It was seen in the first three matches, wins against Deportivo La Coruña and Sporting Gijón and a draw against Real Betis, in which Modrić was praised for creating chances, his positioning and overall performance and influence. On 7 February, Modrić scored a winning goal from outside the box in a 1–2 away win against Granada. Modrić was a regular in the starting line-up when the team won the 2015–16 Champions League in the final against Atlético. He was included in both Champions League, and La Liga's team of the season. For the second time, he also received the LFP award for the "Best Midfielder" of the Spanish first league. He was for the second time included in the FIFA FIFPro World XI.

On 18 October 2016, Modrić signed a new contract with Real Madrid, keeping him at the club until 2020. Due to injury of a left knee sustained in mid-September, he missed eight matches, returning early November. On 18 December, he won the 2016 FIFA Club World Cup with Real Madrid, receiving the Silver Ball for his performances during the tournament. In January 2017, for the first time was included in the UEFA Team of the Year (2016). On 12 March 2017, in a 2–1 win over Real Betis, Modrić played his 200th match for Real Madrid.

Modrić was a regular starter when Real Madrid won the 2016–17 La Liga, as well as the 2016–17 UEFA Champions League, where he provided the assist for Cristiano Ronaldo's second goal in the final against Juventus. Modrić was included in Champions League team of the season and became the first Croatian to win the Champions League three times. He also received the UEFA Club Football award for Best Midfielder of the Champions League season. In the competition for the UEFA Men's Player of the Year Award, he came fourth, while for 2017 Ballon d'Or, fifth. For the third time, he was also included in the FIFA FIFPro World XI.

==== 2017–18: Ballon d'Or and third consecutive Champions League title ====
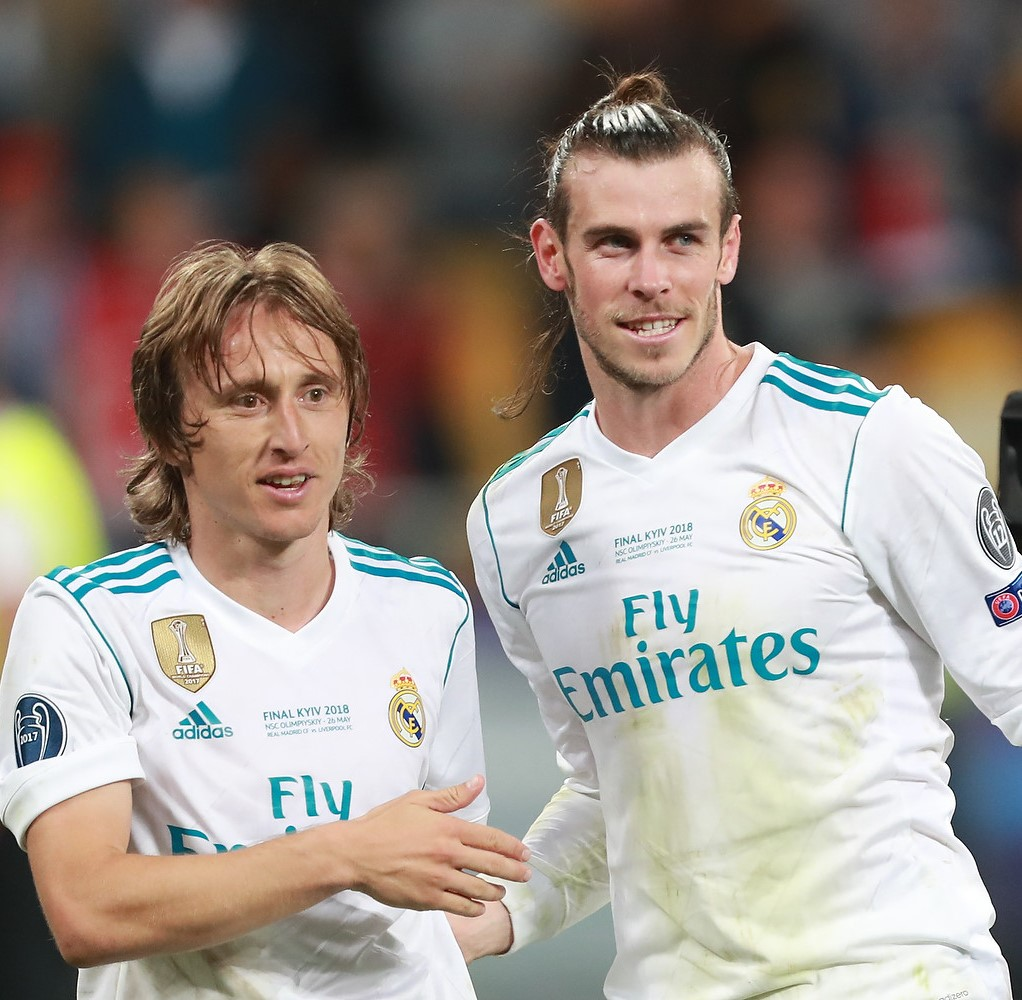
Modrić (left) with Gareth Bale during the 2018 Champions League Final

With the departure of James Rodríguez to Bayern Munich, Modrić inherited the team's coveted number 10 jersey for the new 2017–18 season, replacing his previous number 19 jersey. In December, he won the 2017 FIFA Club World Cup with Real Madrid and received the Golden Ball award as the best player of the competition for his performance. His first goal of the season came in a 7–1 win over Deportivo de La Coruña on 21 January 2018. In the same month was for the second time included in the UEFA Team of the Year (2017). Modrić was a regular starter when Real Madrid won the 2017–18 UEFA Champions League, starting in the final victory against Liverpool which saw Madrid win their third consecutive title. For his performances throughout the campaign, Modrić was included in Champions League team of the season for the third consecutive time. He later received the UEFA Club Football Award for Best Midfielder of the Champions League season for the second consecutive time.

Due to his club, and national team performance at the 2018 FIFA World Cup, where he also received the Golden Ball, in August and September Modrić won the UEFA Men's Player of the Year Award and The Best FIFA Men's Player Award, while in December, he added the Ballon d'Or to his personal tally, marking the first time since 2007 that the award was not won by Lionel Messi or Cristiano Ronaldo. Furthermore, besides becoming the first Croatian player to win these awards, Modrić was the first player to win both the World Cup Golden Ball and the UEFA Men's Player of the Year Award in the same year since Ronaldo in 1998, and the World Cup Golden Ball and the Best FIFA Men's Player of the Year Award after Romário in 1994. Additionally, he is the first player to win the awards from the former Yugoslavia territory, the first footballer from Eastern Europe to win a Ballon d'Or after Andriy Shevchenko in 2004, and the tenth player from Real Madrid to capture the trophy. Furthermore, winning the trophy triggered a clause in his contract, ensuring his stay at the club until 2021. He was also included in the FIFA FIFPro World XI for the fourth time, and won the IFFHS World's Best Playmaker award.

After receiving the FIFA Men's Player of the Year Award, Modrić stated it "shows that we all can become the best with hard work, dedication, and belief, all dreams can come true". Modrić dedicated the Ballon d'Or to "all the players who probably deserved to win it and didn't" in the past decade, including Xavi, Andrés Iniesta, and Wesley Sneijder among others.

==== 2018–2021: Two-time champion of Spain ====
The arrival of new manager Julen Lopetegui in August 2018 saw Modrić given a steady return to the first team as a substitute due to his lack of pre-season training after the 2018 World Cup. This included a substitute appearance in his team's 2–4 loss after extra time against Atlético Madrid in the UEFA Super Cup. His first start of the season came on 1 September in a 4–1 home win against Leganés, in which he assisted his side's third goal, scored by Karim Benzema. His 100th appearance in the UEFA club competition came on 19 September in a 3–0 home win against Roma, in which he assisted the second goal, scored by Gareth Bale. On 22 December, Modrić won his third FIFA Club World Cup, scoring the first goal and assisting for the third in the final against Al Ain. On 13 and 19 January 2019, Modrić for the first time scored in two consecutive league games for Real Madrid, in a 1–2 away win against Real Betis and 2–0 home win against Sevilla. In the same month was included in the UEFA Team of the Year (2018) for the third time in his career. From 27 February to 5 March, Modrić went through what he described as "the most difficult week of his football life," with Real Madrid losing to Barcelona twice and Ajax and crashing out of Copa del Rey, title race and the Champions League, respectively. Despite having had an underwhelming season, for the fifth consecutive time he was included in the FIFA FIFPro World XI.

On 27 August 2019 was the seventh anniversary of Modrić's signing with the club. Although raising doubts due to age of 34 and decision to continue playing with the national team which makes him prone to injuries, Modrić stated that wants to "recapture his best form this season". His first goal of the season came on 5 October in a 4–2 home victory against Granada. On 12 November was awarded with a Golden Foot award. On 23 November he made two assists and scored a goal in a 3–1 home victory against Real Sociedad. On 8 January 2020, Modrić with trivela scored his fifth goal of the season and 100th career goal in a 3–1 victory against Valencia in the semi-finals of 2019–20 Supercopa de España. On 12 January he successfully converted a penalty in a shootout as Real Madrid beat Atlético 4–1 on penalties in the final. Following the continuation of La Liga after a three-month suspension due to COVID-19 pandemic, Modrić was praised for being one of Real Madrid's best players despite his age, resulting in numerous media outlets wondering about prolongation of his contract with the club. On 16 July, he assisted Benzema's opening goal in a 2–1 victory over Villarreal, as Real Madrid secured the league title.

On 21 October 2020, he scored his first goal of the 2020–21 season in a Champions League 3–2 defeat to Shakhtar Donetsk. The goal made him the fourth player in the history of the club to score in the competition aged 35 or more, alongside Alfredo Di Stéfano, Ferenc Puskás and Francisco Gento. It was named the Goal of the Week by UEFA. Three days later, he came off the bench to score with trivela his first ever Clásico goal, as Real Madrid defeated Barcelona 3–1. On 25 May 2021, he extended his contract with Real Madrid until 2022.

==== 2021–2024: Fourth La Liga, sixth Champions League, second Copa del Rey title ====
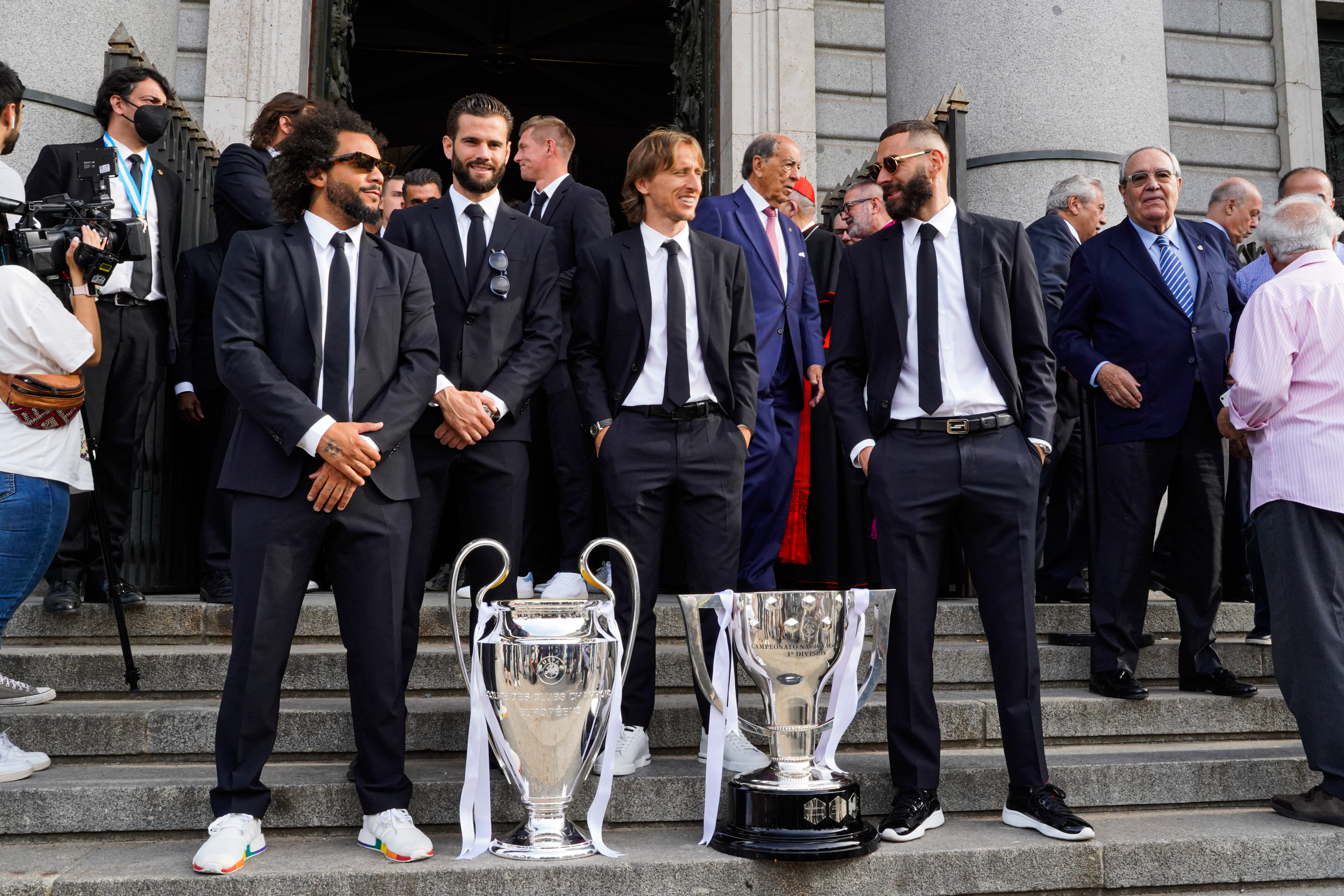
Modrić in a trophy presentation ceremony in front of Almudena Cathedral in May 2022

On 24 October 2021 of 2021–22 season, Modrić played his 400th game for Real Madrid in a 2–1 Clásico victory. On 30 October, Modrić captained Real Madrid for the first time and assisted for the winning goal, after Marcelo had given him the armband upon being substituted off in the 2–1 victory over Elche. On 7 December 2021, he played his 100th Champions League game and was named Man of the Match in a 2–0 victory over Inter Milan. On 16 January 2022, he scored the first goal in the 2022 Supercopa de España Final and was named Man of the Match, as Real Madrid defeated Athletic Bilbao 2–0. The goal made him the oldest goalscorer in the history of the competition. On 5 March, Modrić assisted and scored from outside of the box in a 4–1 victory over Real Socidedad. On 6 and 12 April, Modrić assisted in both legs of Champions League quarter-finals 5–4 aggregate victory against Chelsea. Praised for attacking and defensive performances in both games, because of a long-range trivela assist for Rodrygo in the crucial moment of the second leg was named Man of the Match as well as voted Player of the Week by UEFA. His assist to Rodrygo has been called the "pass of the decade" by Ally McCoist, and as "absolutely perfect, and it was just gorgeous to watch" by Thierry Henry. He was a regular starter on 30 April when Real Madrid won their 35th and his 3rd Spanish title, on 4 May when Real Madrid won in extra time in the second leg against Manchester City, and on 28 May when he won his 5th title in the final of Champions League. For the sixth time in his career, he was included in the UEFA Champions League Squad of the Season. On 8 June 2022, he renewed his contract until 2023.

On 20 August 2022, Modrić landed his first goal and assist of the season in a 4–1 away victory over Celta Vigo in a La Liga fixture. On 6 September he scored in his first Champions League game of the season in a 3–0 away victory against Celtic, becoming the eighth Real Madrid player with 100 appearances in the competition. On 11 September, he became the third Real Madrid player after Puskás and Francisco Buyo to play 100 games while over 35 years of age. In February 2023, Modrić was included for the sixth time in the FIFA FIFPro World XI. On 6 May, he played as a second-half substitute in a 2–1 win over Osasuna in the Copa del Rey final, to achieve his second trophy in that tournament. In June, he extended his contract until 2024.

During the 2023–24 season, with the departure of Benzema, Modrić became vice-captain of the team, but also started to receive less playing time in the starting eleven due to change in formation and competition with younger players like Federico Valverde, Jude Bellingham, Eduardo Camavinga, Aurélien Tchouaméni and Dani Ceballos. On 28 October, Modrić came on as a second-half substitute and made his 500th appearance for Real Madrid in all competitions in a 2–1 away win against Barcelona, to which he contributed with an assist to the last-minute winning goal by Bellingham. On 27 November, in a 3–0 away win against Cádiz, Modrić set the record for most club appearances after 35 years old, with 161 appearances, breaking the previous record he held with Paco Buyo. On 30 April 2024, Modrić came on as a late substitute in the first match of the Champions League semi-final against Bayern Munich and, at the age of 38 years and 234 days, broke the record for the oldest Real Madrid player to make an appearance in the tournament, beating Puskás by five days. A few days later, on 4 May, he became the oldest player to feature in La Liga for Real Madrid, at the age of 38 years and 238 days, breaking another record of Puskás, in a 3–0 win against Cádiz. Furthermore, he clinched his fourth La Liga title with Real Madrid following that victory, thus matching Marcelo, Karim Benzema and Nacho's record as the club's most decorated player with 25 trophies. He extended his record with his 26th trophy in the Champions League final, following a 2–0 victory against Borussia Dortmund, same as for Nacho. He also became the first player to win six finals in the competition, along with Dani Carvajal.

==== 2024–25: Captaincy, records, and departure ====
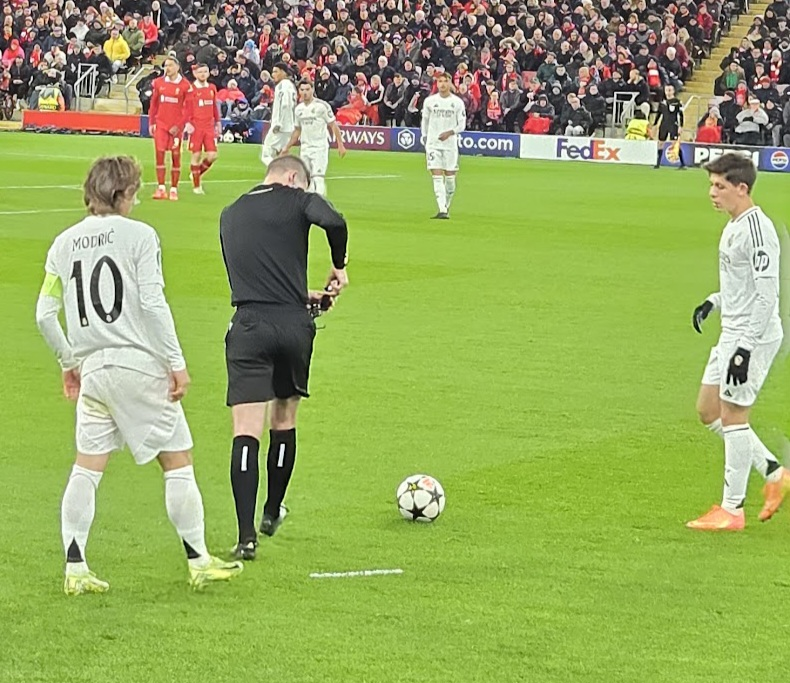
Modrić captaining Real Madrid in a 2024–25 UEFA Champions League phase match against Liverpool in November 2024

On 17 July 2024, Modrić extended his contract until 2025 and became captain of the team following the departure of Nacho. A month later, on 14 August, he achieved his fifth Super Cup trophy following a 2–0 victory over Atalanta, becoming the lone most decorated player in the club's history with 27 titles. On 19 October, he became the oldest player to feature in a competitive match for Real Madrid in a 2–1 away victory over Celta Vigo, aged 39 years and 40 days, surpassing previous record of Puskás in 1966. Later that year, on 18 December, Modrić clinched his record-extending 28th title with the club following a 3–0 victory over Pachuca in the FIFA Intercontinental Cup final.

On 3 January 2025, Modrić scored his first goal of the 2024–25 season during a 2–1 away victory over Valencia, in which he became the oldest player to score for Real Madrid in all competitions, aged 39 years and 116 days, surpassing Ferenc Puskás's record set in 1966. Additionally, he made his 561st appearance for the club, joining the top ten on Real Madrid's all-time appearances list, equalling the records of both Pirri and Míchel. On 23 February, Modrić was named Man of the Match and from a corner kick he scored a half-volley goal from 25 meters during a 2–0 away win over Girona.

Although Modrić played in almost 60 games and recorded more minutes, goals and assists than in the previous season, still showing top-tier quality and importance to the club's midfield, it was announced on 22 May 2025 that Modrić would leave Real Madrid after 13 years at the club, following the 2025 FIFA Club World Cup in the United States. He played his last home game with the club at the Santiago Bernabéu on 24 May against Real Sociedad, receiving club's tribute, and both teams' players guard of honour before the end of the game, due to his legacy. Guillem Balagué described it as the "end of an era" in the club's history. At the FIFA Club World Cup, Modrić played in all six of Real Madrid's matches as the club progressed to the semi-finals, where they were knocked out after losing 4–0 to Paris Saint-Germain.

=== AC Milan ===
On 14 July 2025, Modrić joined Serie A side AC Milan on a free transfer, signing a one-year contract with an optional one-year extension. His salary was set to $4 million with bonus add-ons. He stated that playing for Milan was a childhood dream of his, growing up watching many Croatians play for the club. Upon Modrić's arrival his jersey became the club's top-selling, nearly off-setting his entire contract cost.

He made his debut in the opening match of the season on 23 August against newly promoted Cremonese at the San Siro that ended in a 2–1 defeat, but his performance was praised nonetheless. On his debut, Modrić became the oldest player to make a debut in Serie A, surpassing the previous record held by Empoli goalkeeper Maurizio Pugliesi. In his second game, a 2–0 win away against Lecce, Modrić made an assist and was Milan's MVP of the match. In his third game, a home 1–0 win against Bologna, Modrić scored the winning and his first goal in Serie A, receiving Milan's MVP for the second time in a row.

Over the course of the season, he quickly established himself as an important part of Milan's midfield, but in the final months he began to encounter physical difficulties. His campaign was ultimately cut short by a significant facial injury sustained in a Serie A match against Juventus following a collision with Manuel Locatelli, which resulted in a fractured cheekbone and required surgery in April 2026.

On 23 July 2026, Modrić signed a one-year extension with the club until 30 June 2027, confirming his second season for the Rossoneri.

== International career ==
Modrić began his international career at youth level, playing for the Croatian under-15, under-17, under-18, under-19 and under-21 teams. He debuted in March 2001 for the under-15 team coached by Martin Novoselac, but despite his talent and psychological maturity, he did not become a regular starter and leading player until his debuted for the under-18 team. Novoselac considers him a model for all young players due to his perseverance, sustained hard effort, and talent. Modrić made his full international debut for Croatia on 1 March 2006 in a friendly match against Argentina in Basel, which Croatia won 3–2.

=== 2006–2008: First major tournaments ===
Modrić made two appearances at the 2006 FIFA World Cup finals as a substitute in the group fixtures against Japan and Australia. With the appointment of new manager Slaven Bilić, Modrić earned greater recognition at international level; he scored his first goal in Croatia's 2–0 friendly win over world champions Italy on 16 August 2006 in Livorno.

Modrić's performances ensured a regular place in the international side and he gave a successful showing in Croatia's UEFA Euro 2008 qualifying campaign, which included home and away victories against England. As a young midfielder, much was expected of Modrić; he was often dubbed "the Croatian Cruyff". Modrić scored Croatia's first goal of Euro 2008, converting a penalty in the fourth minute of their 1–0 victory against hosts Austria on 8 June 2008 and becoming the team's youngest ever goalscorer at the European Championships (aged 22 years and 273 days). It was also the fastest penalty ever awarded and scored in the European Championships history. He continued to impress at the tournament and was named UEFA Man of the Match in Croatia's next match when they defeated one of the pre-tournament favourites and eventual finalists Germany. In the quarter-final against Turkey, Modrić took advantage of a mistake by veteran Turkish goalkeeper Rüştü Reçber, and crossed to teammate Ivan Klasnić for the first goal of the match with one minute of extra time remaining, but Semih Şentürk almost immediately equalised for Turkey. In the ensuing penalty shootout, Modrić's kick was off-target and he failed to score the first penalty and Turkey won the shootout 3–1. At the end of the competition, Modrić was included in the UEFA Team of the Tournament, becoming only the second Croatian to achieve this honour after Davor Šuker.

=== 2008–2016: Subsequent struggles ===
In the 2010 World Cup qualifiers, Modrić scored three goals, against Kazakhstan, Andorra, and Ukraine; matching Ivica Olić, Ivan Rakitić and Eduardo. The team failed to qualify finishing one point behind second-placed Ukraine. After appearing in all of their UEFA Euro 2012 qualifying matches and scoring a goal against Israel, Modrić started in all three of Croatia group stage matches against the Republic of Ireland, Italy and Spain, but the team failed to progress. His most notable performance was against Spain. The most memorable moment of the match came when Modrić picked the ball on the halfway line skipping Spain's midfield trio, rushing down on the right to reach the penalty area where he evaded a defender and with a trivela crossed from 16 m (18 yd) to Ivan Rakitić, but Iker Casillas saved this attempt. Because Croatia did not advance from the group stage, Modrić was not included in the Team of the Tournament, although The Daily Telegraph included him in the best 11 until the semi-finals, and his play was well received by critics.

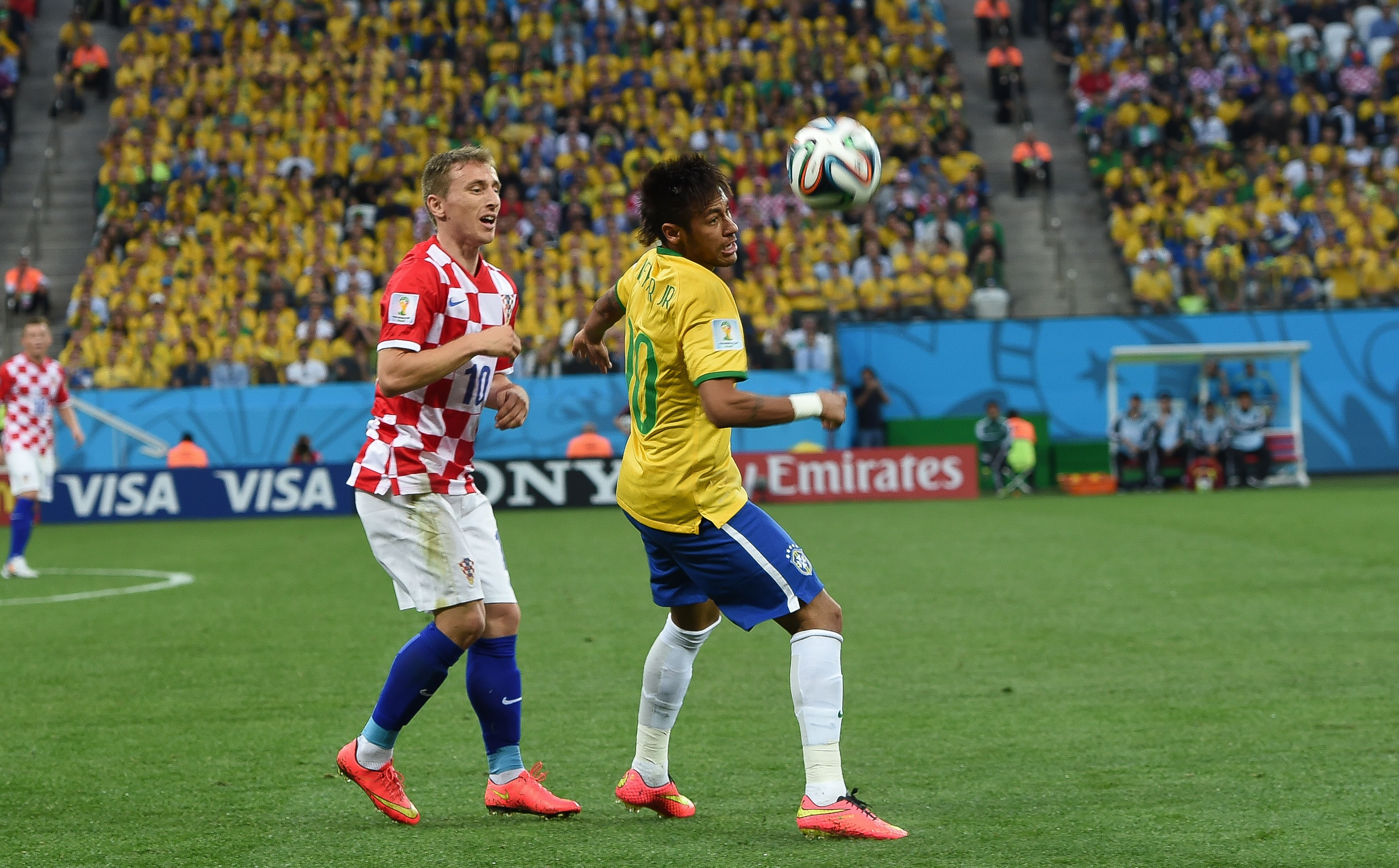
Modrić playing against Neymar of Brazil at the 2014 FIFA World Cup

After the playoffs, Modrić with the Croatian team qualified for the 2014 World Cup. They entered Group A with hosts Brazil, Mexico and Cameroon. Croatia played the opening match against Brazil, which they lost 3–1, and Modrić sustained a minor foot injury. In the second match, Croatia won 4–0 against Cameroon, but did not progress to the knockout stage after losing 3–1 to Mexico, despite the great expectations from the Croatian press and public.

In the Euro 2016 qualifying rounds, Modrić scored his first goals for Croatia in three years, the first against Malta on his 29th birthday with a long-range shot, then a penalty against Azerbaijan. On 3 March 2015, Modrić captained Croatia for the first time, in an away draw against Azerbaijan. In the tournament proper, Modrić scored the match-winning goal in Croatia's opening group stage match against Turkey, a volley from 25 metres (28 yards). In so doing, he became the first Croatian to score at the finals of two separate European Championships, having previously scored against Austria in 2008. He was named Man of the Match. Modrić was forced to miss the crucial fixture against Spain on 21 June because of a minor muscle injury. However, Croatia won and topped the group, but lost to Portugal 0–1 in extra-time in the round of 16.

=== 2016–2018: Golden Ball of the 2018 World Cup ===
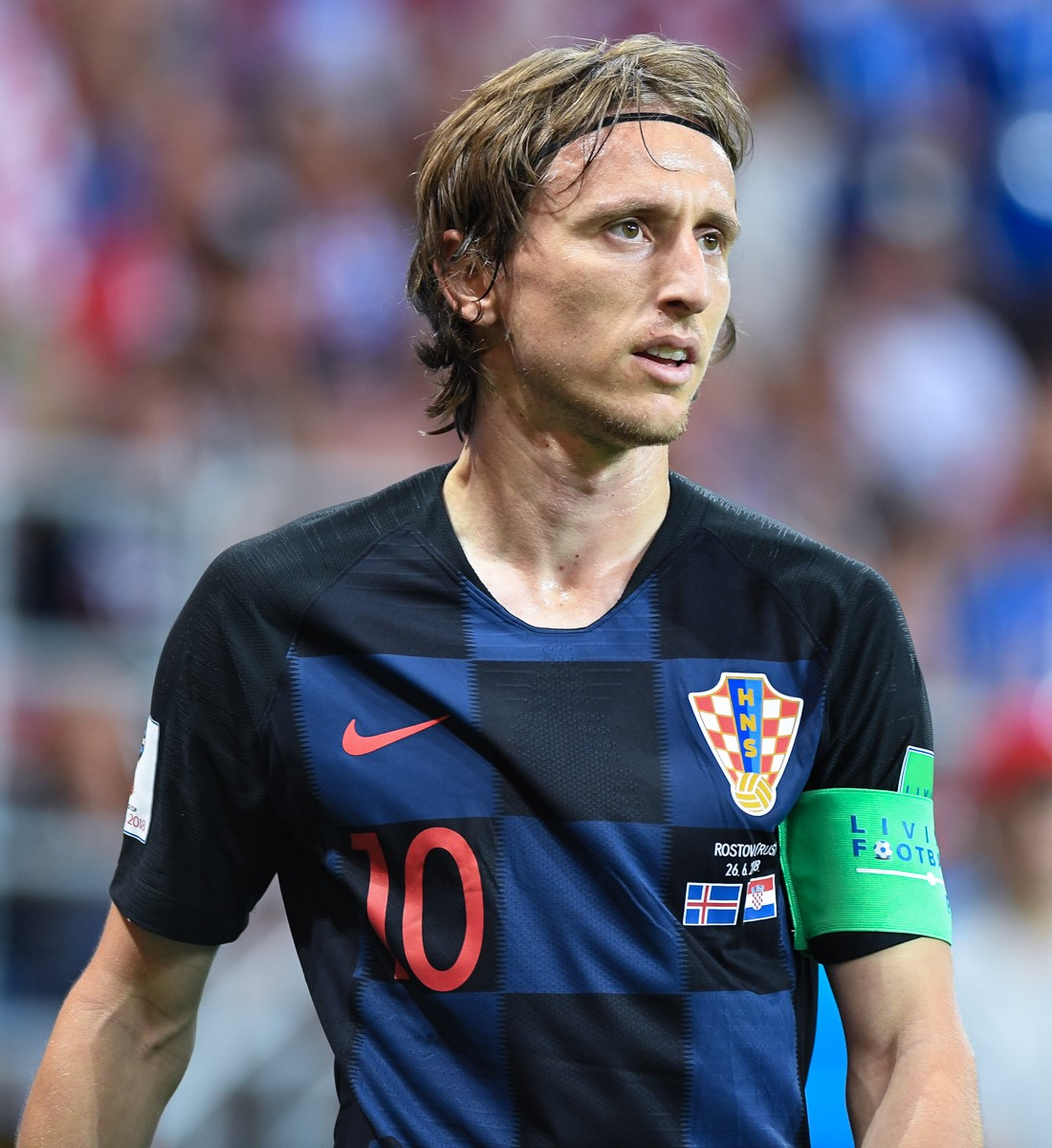
Modrić captaining Croatia at the 2018 FIFA World Cup

For Croatia's 2018 World Cup qualifying campaign, Modrić became the new team captain, following Darijo Srna's retirement. Croatia started the campaign well; however, following 1–0 defeats to Iceland and Turkey and a 1–1 draw with Finland (in which Modrić made his 100th appearance for the national team), Croatia seriously compromised their qualification for the tournament. This caused Modrić to publicly state his lack of confidence in coach Ante Čačić. Čačić was soon replaced by Zlatko Dalić ahead of Croatia's final qualifier against Ukraine away, which Croatia won 2–0 and won a place in the play-offs. Modrić scored a penalty in the 4–1 victory over Greece in the second qualifying round, enabling his team to qualify for the World Cup.

Croatia were placed in Group D alongside Argentina, Iceland and Nigeria. During the tournament, Modrić—along with Ivan Rakitić and Mario Mandžukić—were referred to as Croatia's second "Golden Generation". In Croatia's opening win against Nigeria, Modrić once again successfully executed a penalty kick and was named Man of the Match. He also scored in Croatia's subsequent 3–0 win over Argentina with a long-range shot from 23 m (25 yd), also being named Man of the Match. After also featuring in the final group stage match, against Iceland, his performances in the first round of the tournament saw him ranked by FourFourTwo, The Daily Telegraph and ESPN as the best player of the group stage.

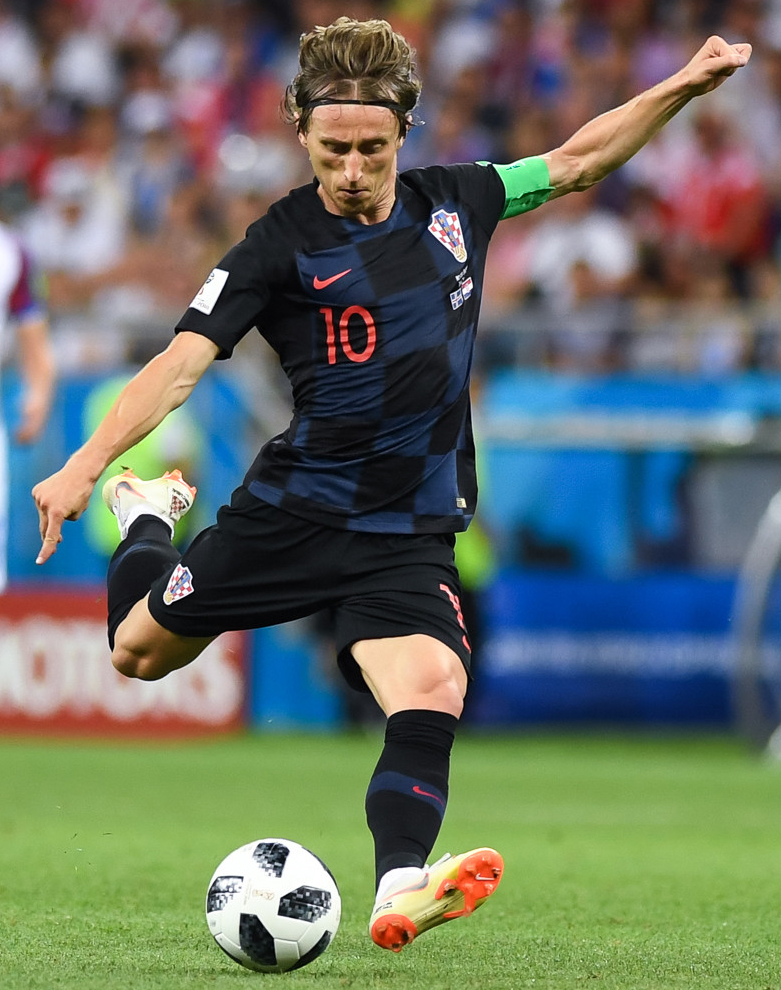
Modrić during the 2018 World Cup

In the round of 16 against Denmark on 1 July, with the score tied at 1–1, Modrić created a goalscoring opportunity for Ante Rebić in the second half of extra-time, who was brought down in the penalty area; Modrić proceeded to take the penalty, but his strike was saved by Kasper Schmeichel. However, Modrić managed to score his spot-kick during the ensuing penalty shoot-out and Croatia advanced to the next round following a 3–2 victory on penalties. In the quarter-finals against hosts Russia on 7 July, Modrić provided an assist in extra-time for Domagoj Vida from a corner kick, and once again scored in the victorious penalty shoot-out following a 2–2 draw; he was named Man of the Match for the third time in the tournament. In the semi-final against England on 11 July, Croatia advanced to the World Cup final for the first time in their history following a 2–1 victory in extra time. It was reported two days before the final match that Modrić ran the most miles out of any player and was third by created chances, as well had most dribbles per match and completed passes in the opponent's half in his team. Although Croatia were beaten 4–2 by France in the final on 15 July, Modrić was awarded the Golden Ball for the best player of the tournament, and was included in the Team of the Tournament. After the squad's huge welcome in Zagreb, Modrić and his teammates Danijel Subašić, Šime Vrsaljko and Dominik Livaković were welcomed by tens of thousands of people in their hometown of Zadar.

Modrić took part in all four matches in the inaugural edition of the UEFA Nations League as Croatia finished at the bottom of Group A4 following historical 6–0 away defeat to Spain in September and a 2–1 defeat to England at the Wembley Stadium in November 2018.

=== 2019–2022: Bronze Ball of the 2022 World Cup ===
During the Euro 2020 qualifying rounds, Modrić scored two goals; a penalty in the away 1–1 draw with Azerbaijan and a solo-effort in the home 3–0 victory over Hungary as Croatia topped the group and qualified for the tournament. However, due to the COVID-19 pandemic, the tournament was postponed for a year. On 24 March 2021, Modrić made his 134th appearance for the national team in a 1–0 2022 World Cup qualifying defeat to Slovenia, equalling Darijo Srna as the most capped player in the history of the team. Three days later, in a 1–0 World Cup qualifying victory over Cyprus, he surpassed Srna's record.

Modrić was selected to the final squad for the UEFA Euro 2020 on 17 May. Despite Croatia's poor showings in their first two group stage games, Modrić was named the Man of the Match in the second one, a 1–1 draw with the Czech Republic on 18 June. Four days later, in the 3–1 victory over Scotland, with a trivela he scored Croatia's second goal and provided Ivan Perišić with an assist for the third goal as Croatia progressed to the round of 16. Modrić's goal made him Croatia's oldest ever goalscorer at the European Championships (aged 35 years and 286 days), while simultaneously holding the record for the youngest goalscorer that he set in 2008.

During the 2022 World Cup qualifying, Modrić scored three times and assisted twice in seven appearances. On 13 June 2022, he scored a penalty in a 1–0 away win over France in the 2022–23 UEFA Nations League A, to be Croatia's first ever win against the latter. On 25 September, he scored opening goal in the last group's game and 3–1 away victory against Austria, helping the team advance to the 2023 UEFA Nations League Finals. On 9 November, Modrić was selected to Croatia's final squad for the 2022 FIFA World Cup. In the first and third group stage games against Morocco and Belgium, he was named the Man of the Match. He became the first player to play in both the European Championship and the World Cup in three different decades. In the round of 16 and quarter-finals, Croatia advanced on penalties against Japan and Brazil, with Modrić scoring in the shoot-out against Brazil, and captaining Croatia to a second consecutive World Cup semi-final where they lost 3–0 to Argentina. In the third place play-off, Croatia prevailed 2–1 over Morocco to secure a bronze medal. Modrić won the Bronze Ball.

Produced by Fulwell 73, FIFA released Captains in 2022, an eight-part sports docuseries following six national team captains including Modrić in their respective 2022 FIFA World Cup qualification campaigns.

=== 2023–2025: Nations League finals and Euro 2024 disappointment ===
On 25 March 2023, in a UEFA Euro 2024 qualifying match against Wales, Modrić became the oldest ever player to play a game for Croatia―aged 37 years, 6 months and 16 days―surpassing Dražen Ladić's record set in 1999.

On 14 June 2023, Modrić was widely praised for his performance as he led Croatia to victory over Netherlands (4–2, a.e.t.) at the De Kuip in Rotterdam, in the semi-finals of the 2023 UEFA Nations League Finals. In the match, Modrić won a penalty being brought down by Cody Gakpo, which was converted by Andrej Kramarić. As the game went to extra time, he assisted Bruno Petković for the winner and closed the win scoring a penalty himself. Modrić was subsequently named Man of the match. Modrić finished second place as Croatia eventually lost to Spain 5–4 on penalties in the final, one of which he scored, following a 0–0 draw after extra time.

On 20 May 2024, Modrić was included in the final squad for the UEFA Euro 2024. He became one of only three players to feature in five European Championships. In the last group stage match against Italy, he had his penalty saved by Gianluigi Donnarumma, but scored a goal a minute later, becoming the oldest goalscorer at the European competition and overpassing Ivica Vastić for 32 days. He was awarded player of the match, despite a stoppage-time equaliser from Mattia Zaccagni that resulted in a 1–1 draw, which eliminated his team from the tournament. In March 2025, at the 2024–25 UEFA Nations League quarter-finals, he captained Croatia against France, ultimately losing on penalties.

=== 2026: Fifth World Cup ===
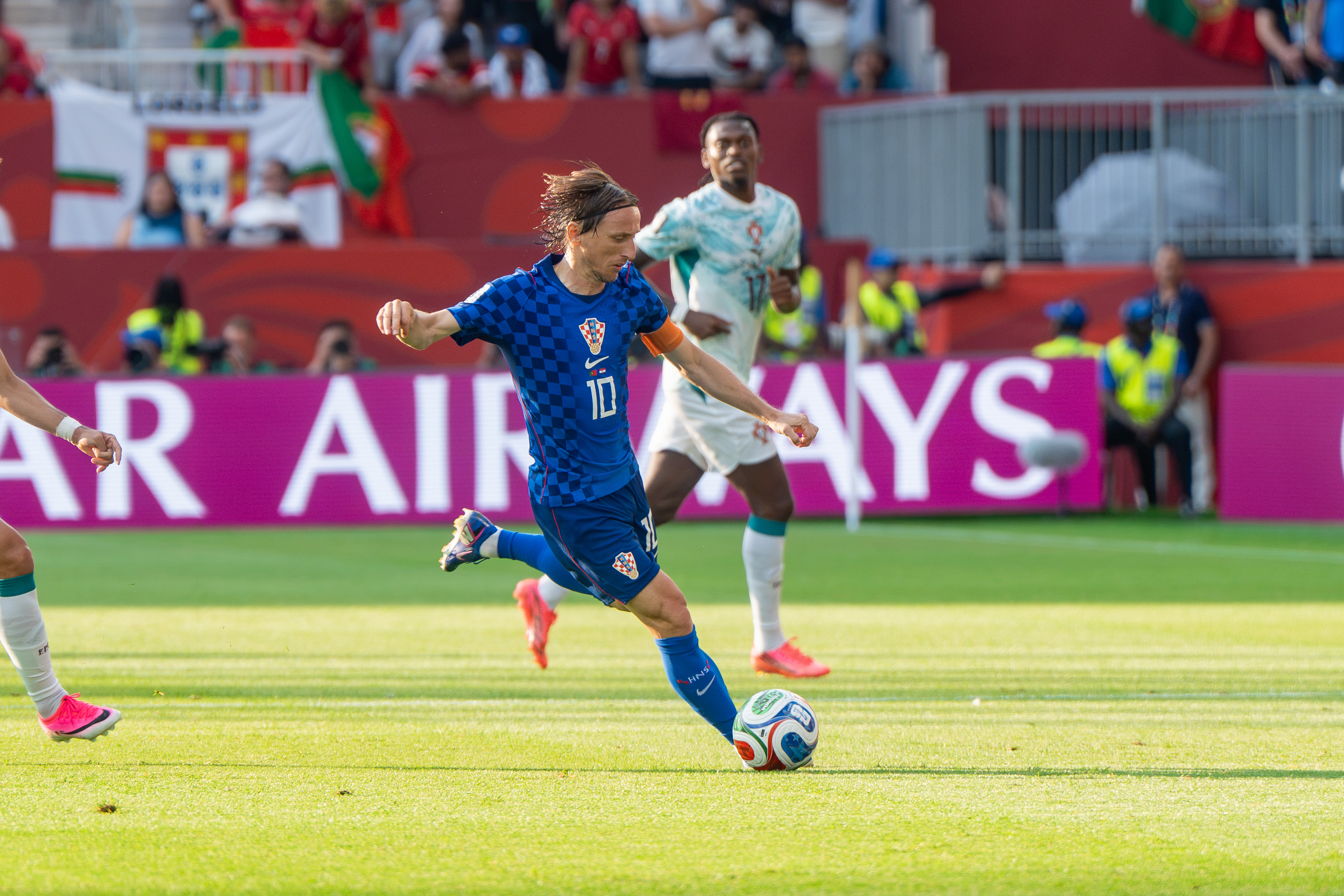
Modrić versus Portugal in the 2026 FIFA World Cup

On 18 May 2026, he was selected in the 26-man squad for the 2026 FIFA World Cup, marking his fifth World Cup appearance. On 17 June, Modrić featured in Croatia's opening 4–2 defeat versus England, becoming the second European player to make an appearance at 10 different major tournaments. On 23 June, he made his 200th international appearance for Croatia in a 1–0 victory over Panama, becoming the fourth player in history to reach this milestone. On 27 June, he provided an assist in a 2–1 victory over Ghana as his nation progressed to the knockout phase, becoming the oldest player to provide an assist at a World Cup at 40 years and 291 days. Modrić's side was knocked out by Portugal after a 2–1 defeat in BMO Field, Toronto, where an equalising 103rd-minute stoppage-time goal from Joško Gvardiol was controversially disallowed as offside by VAR.

== Player profile ==
=== Style of play ===
"Not only is he a very hard worker, he has a good brain and he provided some calmness and composure to the midfield. His passing was neat and his contribution was outstanding. He was not only winning the ball, he was passing well. We thought that he was very influential. He did not just work hard, he made the other people play well around him".

— Gérard Houllier, UEFA Technical Team, 2008

A diminutive and technically gifted midfielder, Modrić is typically deployed as a creative playmaker and sets the tempo of the match by controlling possession from the middle of the pitch. He has been widely applauded by many footballing pundits, managers, and fellow players for his swift passing and long range shots, both often in the style of the trivela technique, as well as his composure and ability to evade tackles under pressure. He is noted for his tactical intelligence and versatility in both attack and defence, as well as his vision, interpretation of space, and work rate. A former attacking midfielder, Modrić is considered a veteran of the "pre-assist" or build-up play, often creating space and time for his teammates to shoot or deliver goal-bound passes to other players. He is also effective at taking set pieces, particularly corners or wide free kicks.

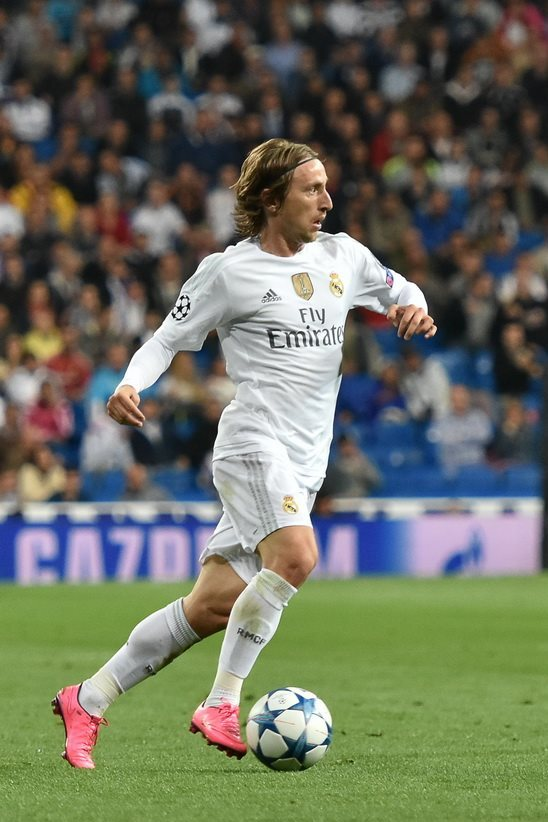
Modrić was regarded as an emblematic "box-to-box" playmaker with Real Madrid.

Modrić has been integral to the success of both Real Madrid and the Croatia national team, having won numerous individual honours for his contributions to club and country. His play-style has earned him several nicknames as dubbed by the media and fandom, including "the midfield maestro", "the magician", "the puppet master", among a variety of others.

=== Position ===
Modrić's complex game has brought him consistent success in the clubs for which he has played. Initially a trequartista or attacking midfielder at Dinamo Zagreb and in his early career at Tottenham, in the 2010–11 season he flourished in a central midfield role as a deep-lying playmaker (regista) who conducts the attack and creates chances for teammates. Afterwards, Modrić acknowledged the role that Harry Redknapp played in shaping of his deep-lying style, saying that dropping back enabled him "to read the game better" and show his full "creativity". Although a central midfielder, Modrić is also a hard-working player who has been seen to adopt a defensive midfield role in addition to playmaking, tracking back to win the ball from the opposition and prepare for a counter-attack, making him one of the most versatile players in the world, capable of playing in several midfield positions. According to Jonathan Wilson, in a 4–2–3–1 system Modrić is a third type of a holding midfielder, being "neither entirely destructive or creative", but a "carrier" who – courtesy of his dribbling ability and attacking drive – is "capable of making late runs or carrying the ball at his feet", but in his case "with a hint of regista". As such, his role has also been likened to that of a mezzala, in Italian football jargon, namely an offensive–minded box-to-box or central midfielder.

The switch to a more deep-lying position reduced his number of assists and goals, as well as his shot per game count (1.2), although his game was no longer based on being a goal threat; despite this, he had the second-highest count of key passes per game (2.06) in the team, as well as a very high pass accuracy rate (87%), with the highest passes per game count (62.5) in the team, the most long balls per game (5.6), the most successful dribbles (2.2), interceptions (2.5), and the highest tackle (1.9) count per game among others, high statistics which placed him amongst the top midfielders of the Premier League. By the 2011–12 season statistically he was among the top-rated central and all-round midfielders across the top five leagues, alongside players like Xabi Alonso, Andrea Pirlo, Bastian Schweinsteiger and Xavi.

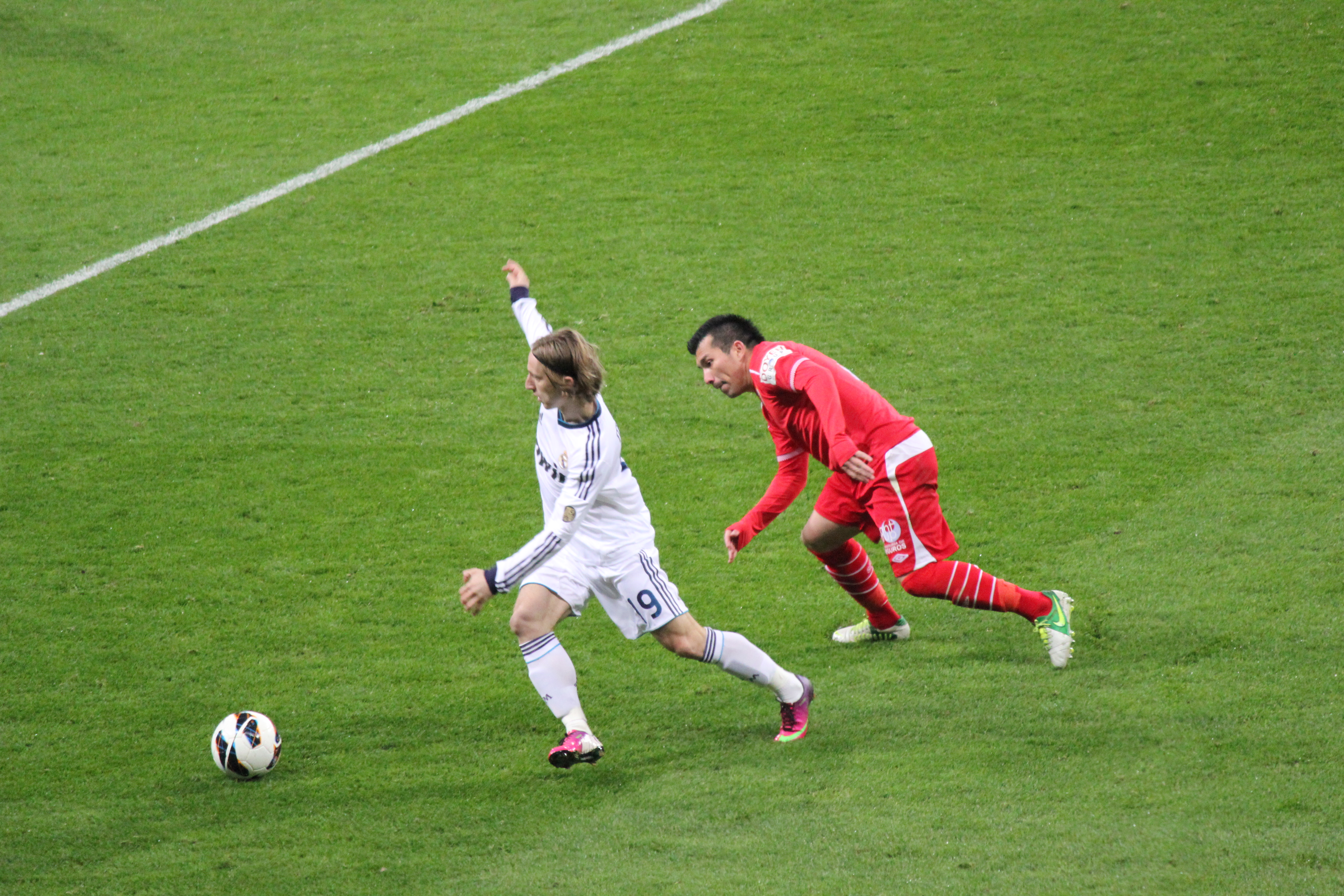
Modrić converting a build-up play against Sevilla in 2013

Upon Modrić's arrival to Real Madrid, his midfield position was described as numbers six (defensive), eight (central) or ten (attacking), depending on the tactics, and his role was described as the second deep-lying pivot alongside Xabi Alonso in the 2012–13 season, a classic deep-lying playmaker whose creativity was needed to dictate his team's play and unlock the opposing defence. In the first half of the 2013–14 season, during which he formed an effective central midfield partnership with Alonso and Ángel Di María, Modrić made more tackles (56) than any other Real Madrid player in La Liga with an average number of 2.86 tackles per match, as well as making the most completed passes (878) in the opposition half of the pitch among Real Madrid players, with the highest passing accuracy in La Liga (90%, also the highest of any midfielder in Europe's top five leagues who have made five or more assists during the season). He produced the highest count of passes (60.7–64.7) and key passes per match (0.8–1.2) within the team. Modrić's average passing accuracy during the season was between 91.6% and 92%, while his highest completion rate in a single match occurred in October 2014 against Barcelona when he completed all 42 attempted passes. That year Modrić's dribble attempts (75) at a success rate of 76% were second in Europe's top five leagues. During the 2015–16 season, although he placed only 12th in terms of chances created, almost all players above him were either forwards or attacking midfielders with no defensive responsibilities. Similar statistics followed his arrival to AC Milan in 2025, where the 40-year-old Modrić led Europe's Big Five leagues in pass completions (98.8%).

=== Reception ===
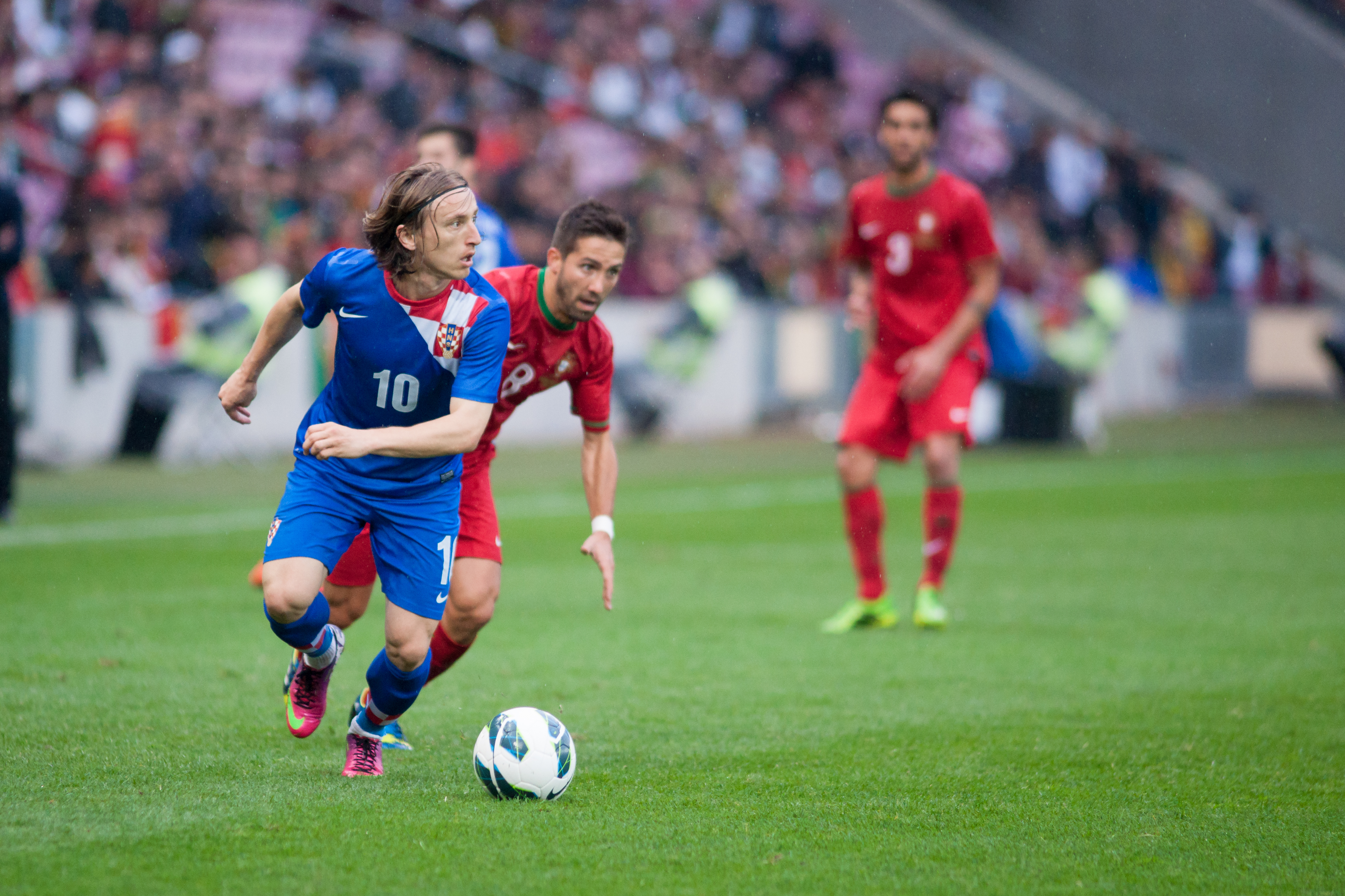
Considered the most versatile and among critical members of the national and club team, Modrić's technical ability has been heralded by both players and coaches.

Modrić is widely regarded as one of the best and most well-rounded and effective midfielders of all time. According to Jonathan Wilson, what sets Modrić apart from traditional playmakers is his simultaneous focus on defensive and attacking duties. Marcelo Bielsa said that "the hardest player to find in football is the eight. I named it 'the Modric'. This position demands a player with the defensive skills of a number six and the offensive prowess of a number ten. Modric is a phenomenal player who fully understands the game and has the ability to defend, the skills to attack and understanding the game in both directions".

Due to his footballing intelligence, skill and fair play he was compared to Paul Scholes, Xavi, Andrés Iniesta, and Andrea Pirlo. In his youth, he had also been compared to Johan Cruyff, while his main influences were compatriot Zvonimir Boban and Italian playmaker Francesco Totti.

He has been consistently praised by some of the sport's most experienced managers, including Johan Cruyff, Alex Ferguson, Pep Guardiola, and Sven-Göran Eriksson among others. From those who managed him, José Mourinho said he wanted Modrić in Real Madrid because of his influence on the game, tactical level and because he has "that artistic sense". Carlo Ancelotti praised Modrić's technique and versatility making him "one of the best midfielders in the world right now, because he can play in more than one position". Zinedine Zidane included him in his best XI currently playing the game, and in 2016 predicted that Modrić would win Ballon d'Or. Slaven Bilić said Modrić "is a player who makes others better, they all benefit from him being in the team. He's not selfish, he's playing for the team ... he's a complete player; good in defence, good in offence—it looks like he was born with the ball at his feet".

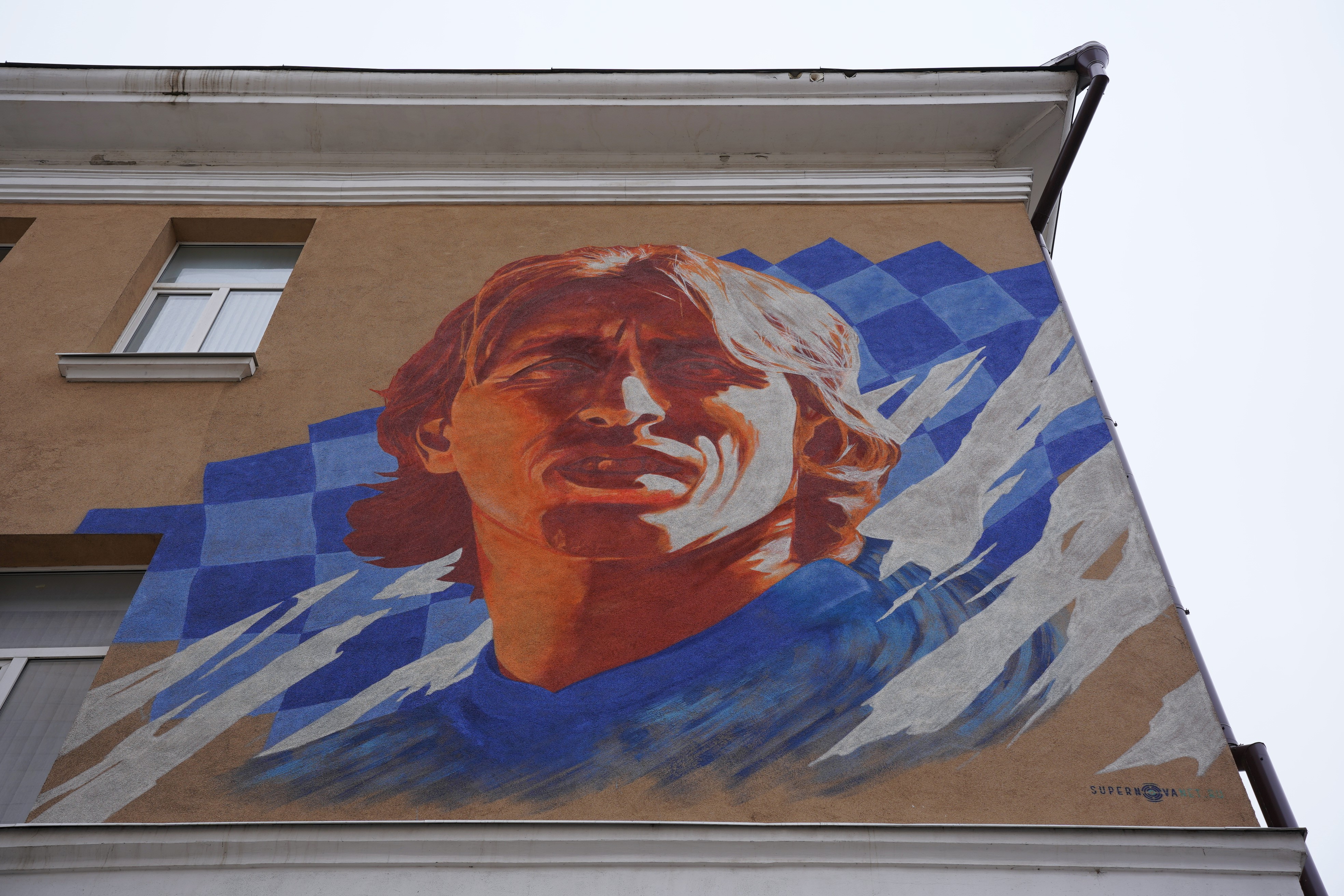
A mural dedicated to Modrić in Kazan.

Modrić is unanimously considered the greatest Croatian footballer of all time by his fellow countrymen, including people like Robert Prosinečki and Davor Šuker. Predrag Mijatović considered him as the best footballer in the history of the Balkans, while Andrés Iniesta, Andriy Shevchenko, Rio Ferdinand, Jan Oblak, and others called him one of the greatest midfielders to ever play the game. In 2025, Marca proclaimed Modrić as the best number 10 in the history of Real Madrid. In addition to his playing ability, Modric has also been praised by pundits, such as Michael Walker of The Athletic, for his career longevity.

On 25 March 2019, he was depicted on a Hrvatska pošta postage stamp. Croatian universities have published studies on his impact on the Croatian economy, tourism sector, nation branding, place branding, and broader elevation of Croatian football internationally.

== Business ventures ==
Aside from playing football, Modrić has embarked on a variety of business ventures. In 2020, he founded real estate company Modrić Family SL in Madrid. In 2022, he invested in Croatian-American startup company Sportening and three years later became a 50% co-owner of Zeppelin Craft Brewery in Croatia. In April 2025, Modrić became a minority co-owner of Welsh football club Swansea City. During the 2010s and 2020s, Modrić featured in endorsement campaigns for Nike, Hublot, Ožujsko, and Panini, among others. Throughout 2026, he was a global brand ambassador for Kalshi, an American prediction markets company.

== Personal life ==
Modrić married Vanja Bosnić in May 2010 in the Croatian capital Zagreb in a private ceremony after four years of dating, and a year later in the Catholic Church. They have three children. Modrić is a cousin of Australian footballer Mark Viduka, and the godfather of Mateo Kovačić's son Ivan. Modrić generally maintains a low profile outside of football.

In late 2019, Modrić released his autobiography Moja igra (My Game), co-written by prominent Croatian sports journalist Robert Matteoni.

=== Philanthropy ===
Out of his philanthropic activities which became publicly confirmed, because he wishes to be anonymous, in 2017 Modrić made a substantial donation to an autism association in Zadar. In 2020, during the COVID-19 pandemic, he donated €100,000 for the purchase of a mobile X-ray machine to a hospital in Zadar, previously donating a hospital in Zagreb.

=== Legal issues ===
Modrić was called to testify in an embezzlement and tax evasion trial in 2018 against the former Dinamo Zagreb executive, Zdravko Mamić. Modrić annexed most of his Tottenham transfer fee to Mamić because he brokered the transfer. Modrić was charged with perjury for stating that he annexed his fee at an earlier date than he allegedly had. "My conscience is clear", he told the judge with the backing of the Croatian Football Federation. The trial drew a mixed response from the Croatian public; some saw it as emblematic of corruption in Croatian football while others supported Modrić as he dealt with the situation during the 2018 FIFA World Cup. Later that year, the Croatian courts dismissed the perjury charge.

== Career statistics ==
=== Club ===
As of match played 22 November 2026

Appearances and goals by club, season and competition
Club	Season	League			National cup (Note: Includes Croatian Cup, FA Cup, Copa del Rey, Coppa Italia)		League cup (Note: Includes Football League Cup)		Europe		Other		Total	
Club	Season	Division	Apps	Goals	Apps	Goals	Apps	Goals	Apps	Goals	Apps	Goals	Apps	Goals
Dinamo Zagreb	2003–04	Prva HNL	0	0	0	0	—		—		—		0	0
Dinamo Zagreb	2004–05	Prva HNL	7	0	1	0	—		—		—		8	0
Dinamo Zagreb	2005–06	Prva HNL	32	7	1	0	—		—		—		33	7
Dinamo Zagreb	2006–07	Prva HNL	30	6	7	1	—		6 (Note: Four appearances in UEFA Champions League, two appearances in UEFA Cup)	0	1 (Note: Appearance in Croatian Super Cup)	1	44	8
Dinamo Zagreb	2007–08	Prva HNL	25	13	8	1	—		12 (Note: Six appearances and two goals in UEFA Champions League, six appearances and one goal in UEFA Cup)	3	—		45	17
Dinamo Zagreb	Total		94	26	17	2	0	0	18	3	1	1	130	32
Zrinjski Mostar (loan)	2003–04	Bosnian Premier League	25	8	—		—		—		—		25	8
Inter Zaprešić (loan)	2004–05	Prva HNL	18	4	—		—		—		—		18	4
Tottenham Hotspur	2008–09	Premier League	34	3	2	1	4	0	4 (Note: Appearances in UEFA Cup)	1	—		44	5
Tottenham Hotspur	2009–10	Premier League	25	3	7	0	0	0	—		—		32	3
Tottenham Hotspur	2010–11	Premier League	32	3	2	0	0	0	9 (Note: Appearances in UEFA Champions League)	1	—		43	4
Tottenham Hotspur	2011–12	Premier League	36	4	3	0	0	0	2 (Note: Appearances in UEFA Europa League)	1	—		41	5
Tottenham Hotspur	Total		127	13	14	1	4	0	15	3	0	0	160	17
Real Madrid	2012–13	La Liga	33	3	8	0	—		11	1	1 (Note: Appearance(s) in Supercopa de España)	0	53	4
Real Madrid	2013–14	La Liga	34	1	6	0	—		11	1	—		51	2
Real Madrid	2014–15	La Liga	16	1	0	0	—		6	0	3 (Note: Two appearances in Supercopa de España, one appearance in UEFA Super Cup)	0	25	1
Real Madrid	2015–16	La Liga	32	2	0	0	—		12	1	—		44	3
Real Madrid	2016–17	La Liga	25	1	2	0	—		11	0	3 (Note: One appearance in UEFA Super Cup, two appearances in FIFA Club World Cup)	0	41	1
Real Madrid	2017–18	La Liga	26	1	2	0	—		11	1	4 (Note: One appearance in Supercopa de España, one appearance in UEFA Super Cup, two appearances in FIFA Club World Cup)	0	43	2
Real Madrid	2018–19	La Liga	34	3	3	0	—		6	0	3 (Note: One appearance in UEFA Super Cup, two appearances and one goal in FIFA Club World Cup)	1	46	4
Real Madrid	2019–20	La Liga	31	3	1	0	—		6	1	2	1	40	5
Real Madrid	2020–21	La Liga	35	5	0	0	—		12	1	1	0	48	6
Real Madrid	2021–22	La Liga	28	2	2	0	—		13	0	2	1	45	3
Real Madrid	2022–23	La Liga	33	4	4	0	—		10	2	5 (Note: Two appearances in Supercopa de España, one appearance in UEFA Super Cup, two appearances in FIFA Club World Cup)	0	52	6
Real Madrid	2023–24	La Liga	32	2	1	0	—		11	0	2	0	46	2
Real Madrid	2024–25	La Liga	35	2	5	2	—		14	0	9 (Note: One appearance in Supercopa de España, one appearance in UEFA Super Cup, one appearance in FIFA Intercontinental Cup, six appearances in FIFA Club World Cup)	0	63	4
Real Madrid	Total		394	30	34	2	0	0	134	8	35	3	597	43
AC Milan	2025–26	Serie A	34	2	2	0	—		—		1 (Note: Appearance in Supercoppa Italiana)	0	37	2
AC Milan	2026–27	Serie A	12	0	0	0	—		2	0	—		14	0
AC Milan	Total		46	2	2	0	—		2	0	1	0	51	2
Career total			704	83	67	5	4	0	169	14	37	4	981	106

=== International ===
As of match played 15 November 2026

Appearances and goals by national team and year
National team	Year	Apps	Goals
Croatia	2006	12	2
Croatia	2007	10	1
Croatia	2008	11	3
Croatia	2009	3	1
Croatia	2010	8	0
Croatia	2011	9	1
Croatia	2012	9	0
Croatia	2013	10	0
Croatia	2014	11	2
Croatia	2015	4	0
Croatia	2016	8	1
Croatia	2017	8	1
Croatia	2018	15	2
Croatia	2019	9	2
Croatia	2020	6	0
Croatia	2021	13	4
Croatia	2022	16	3
Croatia	2023	10	1
Croatia	2024	12	3
Croatia	2025	10	1
Croatia	2026	14	2
Total		208	30

As of match played 15 November 2026
Croatia score listed first, score column indicates score after each Modrić goal.

List of international goals scored by Luka Modrić
No.	Date	Venue	Cap	Opponent	Score	Result	Competition
1	16 August 2006	Stadio Armando Picchi, Livorno, Italy	8	Italy	2–0	2–0	Friendly
2	7 October 2006	Stadion Maksimir, Zagreb, Croatia	10	Andorra	7–0	7–0	UEFA Euro 2008 qualifying
3	7 February 2007	Stadion Kantrida, Rijeka, Croatia	13	Norway	2–0	2–1	Friendly
4	8 June 2008	Ernst-Happel-Stadion, Vienna, Austria	27	Austria	1–0	1–0	UEFA Euro 2008
5	6 September 2008	Stadion Maksimir, Zagreb, Croatia	30	Kazakhstan	2–0	3–0	2010 FIFA World Cup qualification
6	15 October 2008	Stadion Maksimir, Zagreb, Croatia	33	Andorra	3–0	4–0	2010 FIFA World Cup qualification
7	6 June 2009	Stadion Maksimir, Zagreb, Croatia	35	Ukraine	2–2	2–2	2010 FIFA World Cup qualification
8	6 September 2011	Stadion Maksimir, Zagreb, Croatia	49	Israel	1–1	3–1	UEFA Euro 2012 qualifying
9	9 September 2014	Stadion Maksimir, Zagreb, Croatia	80	Malta	1–0	2–0	UEFA Euro 2016 qualifying
10	13 October 2014	Stadion Gradski vrt, Osijek, Croatia	82	Azerbaijan	5–0	6–0	UEFA Euro 2016 qualifying
11	12 June 2016	Parc des Princes, Paris, France	91	Turkey	1–0	1–0	UEFA Euro 2016
12	9 November 2017	Stadion Maksimir, Zagreb, Croatia	102	Greece	1–0	4–1	2018 FIFA World Cup qualification
13	16 June 2018	Kaliningrad Stadium, Kaliningrad, Russia	107	Nigeria	2–0	2–0	2018 FIFA World Cup
14	21 June 2018	Nizhny Novgorod Stadium, Nizhny Novgorod, Russia	108	Argentina	2–0	3–0	2018 FIFA World Cup
15	9 September 2019	Bakcell Arena, Baku, Azerbaijan	124	Azerbaijan	1–0	1–1	UEFA Euro 2020 qualifying
16	10 October 2019	Stadion Poljud, Split, Croatia	125	Hungary	1–0	3–0	UEFA Euro 2020 qualifying
17	30 March 2021	Stadion Rujevica, Rijeka, Croatia	136	Malta	2–0	3–0	2022 FIFA World Cup qualification
18	22 June 2021	Hampden Park, Glasgow, Scotland	141	Scotland	2–1	3–1	UEFA Euro 2020
19	11 October 2021	Stadion Gradski vrt, Osijek, Croatia	144	Slovakia	2–2	2–2	2022 FIFA World Cup qualification
20	11 November 2021	National Stadium, Ta' Qali, Malta	145	Malta	4–1	7–1	2022 FIFA World Cup qualification
21	29 March 2022	Education City Stadium, Al Rayyan, Qatar	148	Bulgaria	1–1	2–1	Friendly
22	13 June 2022	Stade de France, Saint-Denis, France	152	France	1–0	1–0	2022–23 UEFA Nations League A
23	25 September 2022	Ernst-Happel-Stadion, Vienna, Austria	154	Austria	1–0	3–1	2022–23 UEFA Nations League A
24	14 June 2023	De Kuip, Rotterdam, Netherlands	165	Netherlands	4–2	4–2 (a.e.t.)	2023 UEFA Nations League Finals
25	8 June 2024	Estádio Nacional, Oeiras, Portugal	175	Portugal	1–0	2–1	Friendly
26	24 June 2024	Red Bull Arena, Leipzig, Germany	178	Italy	1–0	1–1	UEFA Euro 2024
27	8 September 2024	Opus Arena, Osijek, Croatia	180	Poland	1–0	1–0	2024–25 UEFA Nations League A
28	9 June 2025	Opus Arena, Osijek, Croatia	188	Czech Republic	2–1	5–1	2026 FIFA World Cup qualification
29	7 June 2026	Stadion Varteks, Varaždin, Croatia	198	Slovenia	1–0	2–1	Friendly
30	26 September 2026	Fortuna Arena, Prague, Czech Republic	203	Czech Republic	1–0	2–1	2026–27 UEFA Nations League A

== Honours ==
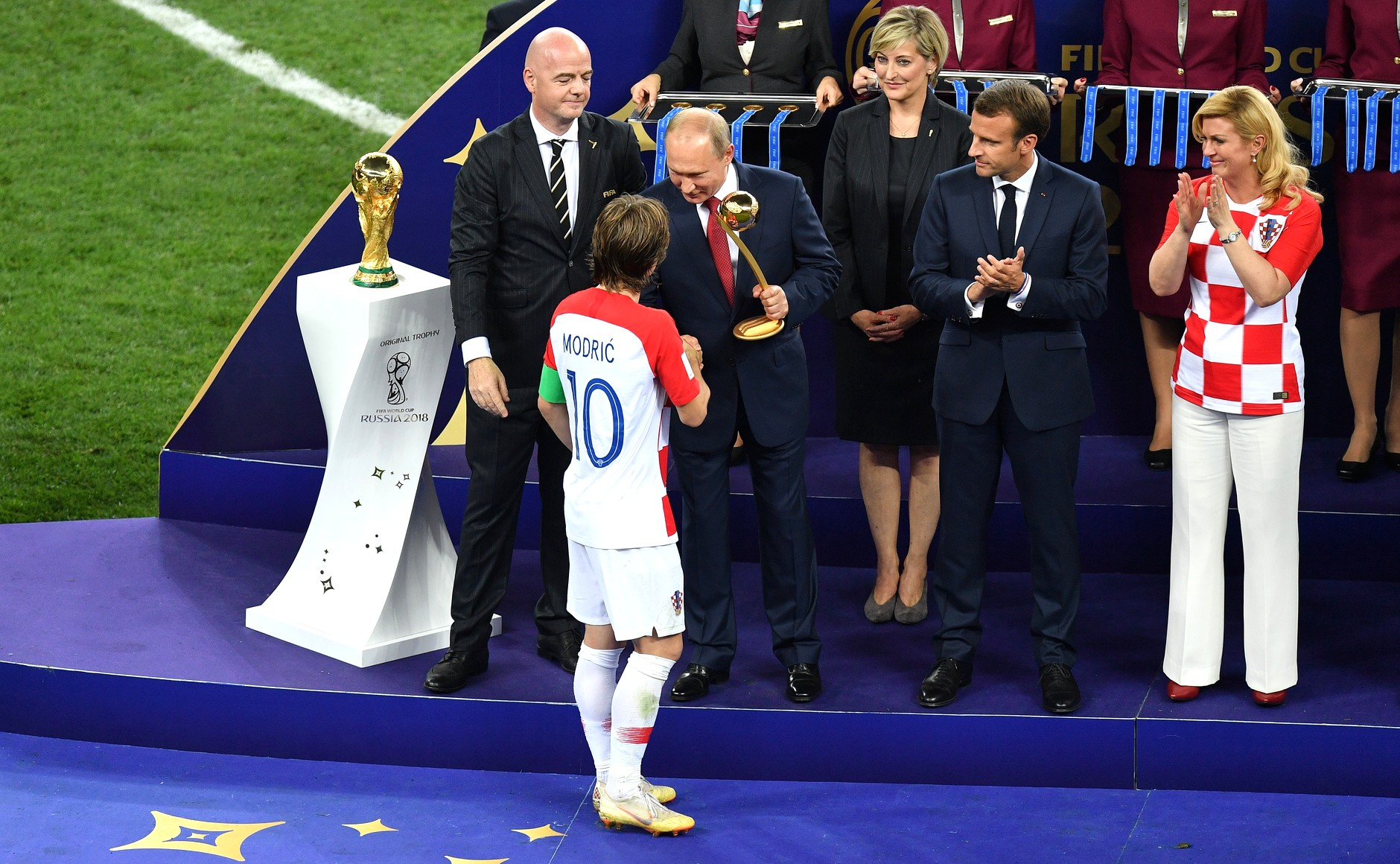
Modrić is the most decorated Croatian player with 34 major trophies.

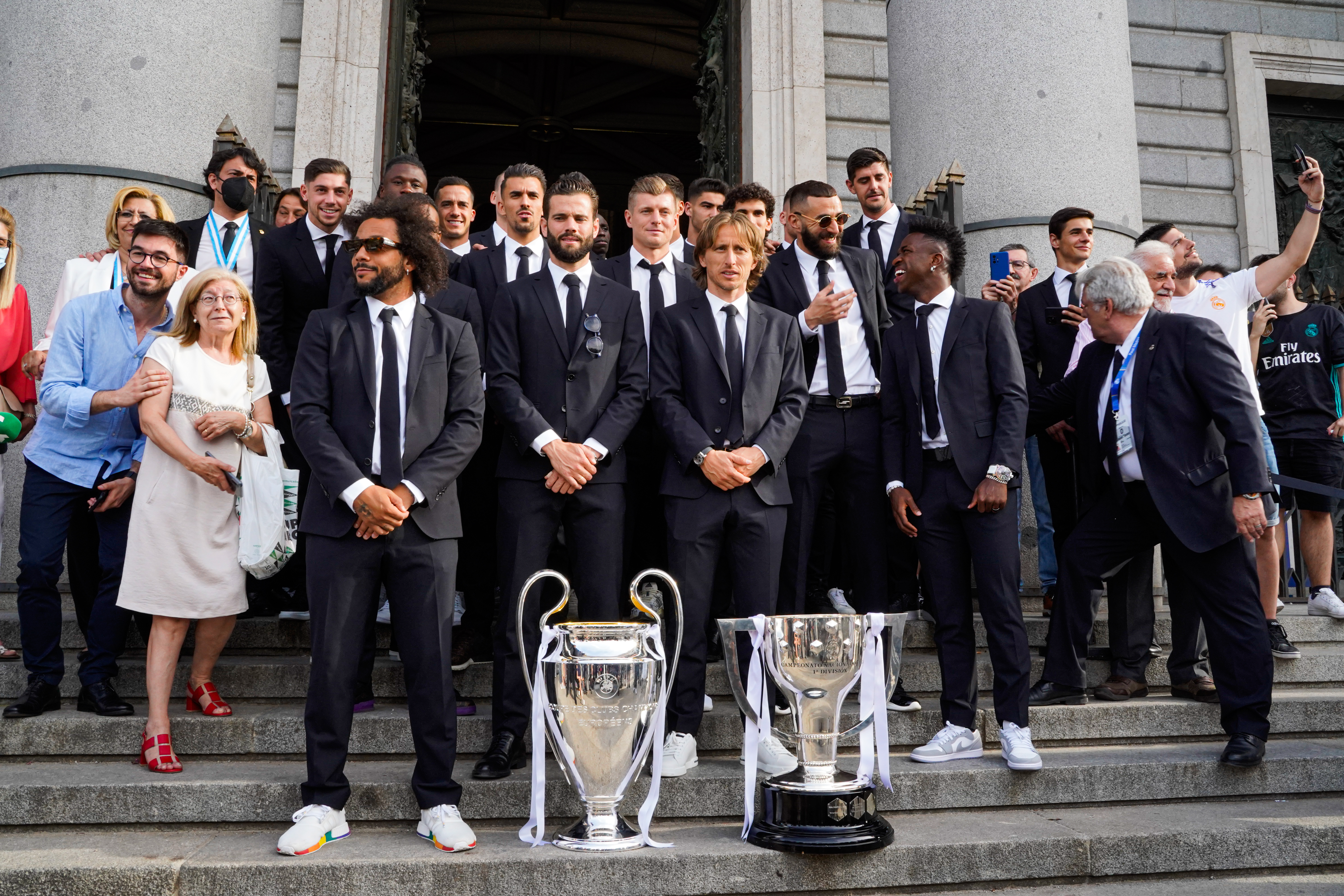
Modrić, alongside Real Madrid presenting their 2022 Champions League trophy to the Virgin of Almudena, is also Real Madrid's most decorated player with 28 major trophies.

Dinamo Zagreb

- Prva HNL: 2005–06, 2006–07, 2007–08
- Croatian Cup: 2006–07, 2007–08
- Croatian Super Cup: 2006

Tottenham Hotspur

- Football League Cup runner-up: 2008–09

Real Madrid

- La Liga: 2016–17, 2019–20, 2021–22, 2023–24
- Copa del Rey: 2013–14, 2022–23
- Supercopa de España: 2012, 2017, 2020, 2022, 2024
- UEFA Champions League: 2013–14, 2015–16, 2016–17, 2017–18, 2021–22, 2023–24
- UEFA Super Cup: 2014, 2016, 2017, 2022, 2024
- FIFA Club World Cup: 2014, 2016, 2017, 2018, 2022
- FIFA Intercontinental Cup: 2024

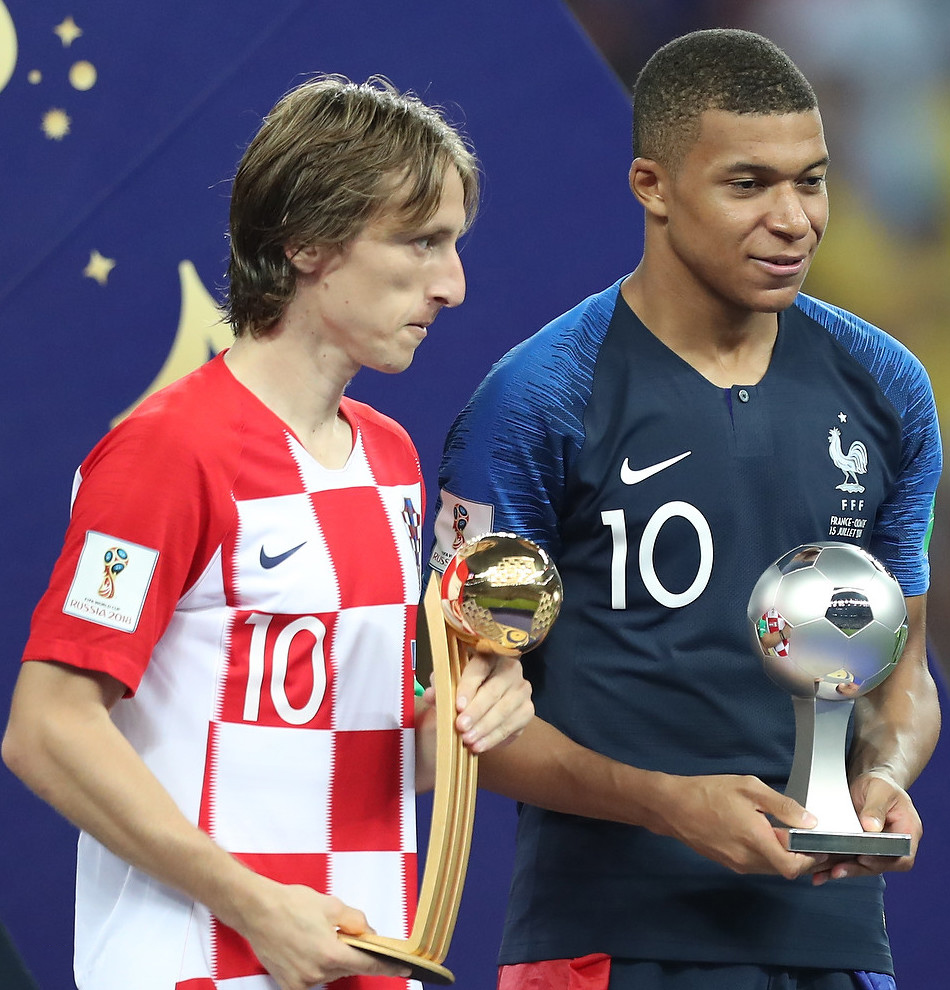
Modrić (left) receiving the best player in the 2018 World Cup award, alongside Kylian Mbappé (right).

Croatia

- FIFA World Cup: runner-up 2018, third place 2022
- UEFA Nations League: runner-up 2023

Individual

Major awards

- Ballon d'Or: 2018
- The Best FIFA Men's Player: 2018
- UEFA Men's Player of the Year Award: 2017–18
- Golden Foot: 2019

Croatian player awards

- Best Croatian U-21 player: 2004
- Croatian Football Hope of the Year: 2004
- HNL's Footballer of the Year: 2007
- Prva HNL Player of the Year: 2007
- SN Yellow Shirt Award: 2007–08
- Croatian Footballer of the Year: 2007, 2008, 2011, 2014, 2016, 2017, 2018, 2019, 2020, 2021, 2022, 2023, 2024, 2025
- Football Oscar for Best Croatian Player: 2013, 2014, 2015, 2016, 2017, 2018, 2019, 2020, 2021, 2022, 2023, 2024, 2025, 2026
- Franjo Bučar State Award for Sport – Yearly Award: 2018
- HNS Trophy for Best Croatian Player: 2018
- HOO Sportsman of the Year: 2018
- SN Sportsman of the Year: 2018, 2022

League and club awards

- Bosnian Premier League Player of the Year: 2003
- Tottenham Hotspur Player of the Year: 2010–11
- La Liga's Best Midfielder: 2013–14, 2015–16
- La Liga Team of the Season: 2015–16, 2021–22, 2022–23
- UEFA La Liga Team of the Season: 2015–16
- Real Madrid Player of the Season: 2020–21
- Serie A Team of the Year: 2025–26

UEFA, FIFA and IFFHS best team selections

- UEFA Champions League Squad of the Season: 2013–14, 2015–16, 2016–17, 2017–18, 2020–21
- UEFA Champions League Team of the Season: 2021–22
- UEFA Champions League Midfielder of the Season: 2016–17, 2017–18
- UEFA Team of the Year: 2016, 2017, 2018
- FIFA FIFPRO World 11: 2015, 2016, 2017, 2018, 2019 2022
- IFFHS Men's World Team: 2017, 2018, 2022
- IFFHS World Team of the Decade: 2011–2020
- IFFHS UEFA Team of the Decade: 2011–2020

World Cup and Club World Cup awards

- FIFA World Cup Golden Ball: 2018
- FIFA World Cup Bronze Ball: 2022
- FIFA World Cup Fantasy Team: 2018
- FIFA World Cup Dream Team: 2018
- FIFA Club World Cup Golden Ball: 2017
- FIFA Club World Cup Silver Ball: 2016
- FIFA World Series ACUD Cup: 2024 Best Player

Media rankings and other honours

- ESPN Midfielder of the Year: 2016, 2017, 2018
- IFFHS World's Best Playmaker: 2018
- BTA Best Balkan Athlete of the Year: (2018)
- Goal 50: 2017–18
- The Guardian Best Footballer in the World: 2018
- World Soccer Player of the Year: 2018
- Dongqiudi Player of the Year: 2018
- AIPS Athlete of the Year: 2018
- ESM Team of the Year: 2021–22
- Marca Leyenda Award: 2022

=== State honours and orders ===
- Honorary citizen of the city of Zadar (2018) and Zadar County (2019)
- Order of Duke Branimir: 2018
- Charter of the Republic of Croatia: 2024

== See also ==
- List of men's footballers with 100 or more international caps
- List of men's footballers with the most official appearances
