= 2006–07 Croatian Football Cup =

Tournament details
- Country: Croatia
- Teams: 48

Final positions
- Champions: Dinamo Zagreb (8th title)
- Runners-up: Slaven Belupo

Tournament statistics
- Matches played: 54
- Goals scored: 181 (3.35 per match)
- Top goal scorer: Eduardo (6)

The 2006–07 Croatian Football Cup was the sixteenth season of Croatia's football knockout competition.

== Calendar ==
Round	Main date	Number of fixtures	Clubs	New entries this round
Preliminary round	30 August 2006	16	48 → 32	none
First round	20 September 2006	16	32 → 16	16
Second round	25 October 2006	8	16 → 8	none
Quarter-finals	22 and 29 November 2006	8	8 → 4	none
Semi-finals	14 March and 4 April 2007	4	4 → 2	none
Final	9 and 26 May 2007	2	2 → 1	none

== Preliminary round ==
The preliminary round was held on 30 August 2006.

Tie no	Home team	Score	Away team
1	Koprivnica	1–1 (6–5 p)	Metalac Osijek
2	Medulin 1921	2–3	Vinogradar
3	Mladost Ždralovi	4–0	Samobor
4	Oriolik	3–3 (4–5 p)	Hrvace
5	Križevci	6–2	Slavonac CO
6	Vodice	2–3	Segesta
7	Graničar	2–2 (2–4 p)	Croatia Sesvete
8	Vukovar '91	3–0	Rudar Labin
9	Bratstvo Gornje Bazje	0–1	Karlovac
10	Nova Ves	0–5	Grobničan
11	Dragovoljac Poličnik	1–3	Novalja
12	Konavljanin	4–0	Zagorec
13	Dinamo Palovec	0–0 (3–4 p)	Đakovo
14	Međimurje	2–0	Slavija Pleternica
15	Bjelovar	3–2	Moslavina
16	Lučko	1–1 (5–6 p)	Podravina

== First round ==
Matches played on 20 September 2006.

Tie no	Home team	Score	Away team
1	Đakovo	1–2	Rijeka
2	Grobničan	0–2	Dinamo Zagreb
3	Konavljanin	2–1	Varteks
4	Mladost Ždralovi	0–3	Hajduk Split
5	Križevci	2–5	Osijek
6	Hrvace	1–1 (6–5 p)	Pula Staro Češko
7	Podravina	1–4	Kamen Ingrad
8	Karlovac	0–1	Cibalia
9	Vukovar '91	2–1	Pomorac
10	Novalja	0–4	NK Zagreb
11	Koprivnica	0–2	Slaven Belupo
12	Bjelovar	0–3	Inter Zaprešić
13	Croatia Sesvete	2–2 (5–6 p)	Belišće
14	Segesta	3–1	Zadar
15	Međimurje	1–4	Šibenik
16	Vinogradar	1–1 (6–7 p)	Hrvatski Dragovoljac

== Second round ==
Matches played on 24 and 25 October 2006.

Tie no	Home team	Score	Away team
1	Hajduk Split	5–2 (aet)	Belišće
2	Inter Zaprešić	3–1	Osijek
3	Slaven Belupo	4–2	Hrvace
4	NK Zagreb	1–1 (5–3 p)	Kamen Ingrad
5	Cibalia	2–0 (aet)	Vukovar '91
6	Hrvatski Dragovoljac	0–0 (3–5 p)	Rijeka
7	Dinamo Zagreb	3–0	Šibenik
8	Konavljanin	2–0	Segesta

== Quarter-finals ==
First legs were held on 21 and 22 November and second legs between 28 November and 6 December 2006.

Team 1	Agg.	Team 2	1st leg	2nd leg
Cibalia	4–6	Hajduk Split	2–3	2–3
Inter Zaprešić	2–4	Dinamo Zagreb	1–2	1–2
Rijeka	4–3	Konavljanin	3–1	1–2
Slaven Belupo	9–2	NK Zagreb	6–0	3–2

== Semi-finals ==
14 March 2007
17:00

Rijeka	0–0	Slaven Belupo
	Report (in Croatian)

Stadion Kantrida, Rijeka
Attendance: 4,000
Referee: Edo Trivković (Split)
4 April 2007
16:30

Slaven Belupo	3–2	Rijeka
Vručina 11'; Kristić 31'; Mumlek 58' (pen.)	Report (in Croatian)	Ah. Sharbini 73'; Ivanov 80'

Gradski stadion, Koprivnica
Attendance: 2,000
Referee: Ivan Novak (Varaždin)

Slaven Belupo won 3–2 on aggregate.

14 March 2007
20:15

Dinamo Zagreb	1–0	Hajduk Split
Vugrinec 40'	Report (in Croatian)

Stadion Maksimir, Zagreb
Attendance: 15,000
Referee: Ivan Bebek (Rijeka)
4 April 2007
17:30

Hajduk Split	2–2	Dinamo Zagreb
Damjanović 39'; Bartolović 45'; Pelaić (red card) 88'	Report (in Croatian)	Modrić 76'; Tadić 90'

Stadion Poljud, Split
Attendance: 25,000
Referee: Vlado Svilokos (Sisak)

Dinamo Zagreb won 3–2 on aggregate.

== Final ==
=== First leg ===
9 May 2007
20:15 CET

Dinamo Zagreb	1–0	Slaven Belupo
Eduardo 76' (pen.)	Report (in Croatian)

Stadion Maksimir, Zagreb
Attendance: 6,000
Referee: Ante Vučemilović (Osijek)

=== Second leg ===
26 May 2007
20:15 CET

Slaven Belupo	1–1	Dinamo Zagreb
Mumlek 68' (pen.)	Report (in Croatian)	Schildenfeld 89'

Gradski stadion, Koprivnica
Attendance: 5,000
Referee: Ivan Bebek (Rijeka)

Dinamo Zagreb won 2–1 on aggregate.

== See also ==
- 2006–07 Croatian First Football League
- 2006–07 Croatian Second Football League
