= 2012–13 NK Slaven Belupo season =

Slaven Belupo
2012–13 season
- Chairman: Stanislav Biondić
- Manager: Roy Ferenčina (until 10 March 2013); Roman Sović (from 14 March 2013)
- Prva HNL: 8th
- Croatian Cup: Semi-finals
- UEFA Europa League: Third qualifying round
- Top goalscorer: League: Davor Vugrinec (8); All: Davor Vugrinec (10)

This article shows statistics of individual players for the Slaven Belupo football club. It also lists all matches that Slaven Belupo played in the 2012–13 season.

Slaven Belupo finished eighth in the final league standings.

== First-team squad ==
As of 1 March 2013

Note: Flags indicate national team as defined under FIFA eligibility rules; some limited exceptions apply. Players may hold more than one non-FIFA nationality.

No.	Pos.	Nation	Player
1	GK	CRO	Tomislav Pelin
3	DF	BIH	Borislav Pilipović
4	DF	CRO	Elvis Kokalović
5	DF	CRO	Mato Grgić
6	DF	CRO	Igor Bubnjić
7	MF	CRO	Dario Čanađija
8	MF	CRO	Igor Jugović
9	FW	CRO	Martin Šaban
10	MF	CRO	Petar Brlek
11	MF	CRO	Dejan Glavica
12	GK	CRO	Silvio Rodić
13	DF	BIH	Mario Barić

No.	Pos.	Nation	Player
14	MF	CRO	Mateas Delić
15	FW	CRO	Davor Vugrinec
16	DF	CRO	Vedran Purić
17	MF	CRO	Matej Herent
18	FW	CRO	Mario Jelavić
20	MF	CRO	Mario Gregurina
21	MF	CRO	Nikola Rak
22	FW	CRO	Enes Novinić
23	DF	CRO	Stjepan Geng
24	DF	CRO	Jurica Pranjić
26	DF	CRO	Alen Maras
30	MF	CRO	Ante Batarelo

== Competitions ==
=== Overall ===
Competition	Started round	Final result	First match	Last Match
2012–13 Prva HNL	–	8th	22 July 2012	26 May 2013
2012–13 Croatian Cup	First round	Semi-finals	26 September 2012	17 April 2013
2012–13 UEFA Europa League	QR2	QR3	19 July 2012	9 August 2012

=== Prva HNL ===
==== Classification ====
Pos	Team	Pld	W	D	L	GF	GA	GD	Pts	Qualification or relegation
6	Istra 1961	33	11	11	11	35	32	+3	44	
7	Osijek	33	9	12	12	25	33	−8	39	
8	Slaven Belupo	33	10	9	14	35	50	−15	39	
9	Zadar	33	9	9	15	39	61	−22	36	
10	Inter Zaprešić (R)	33	8	11	14	36	41	−5	35	Relegation to Croatian Second Football League

Source: Sportnet.hr
Rules for classification: 1) points; 2) goal difference; 3) number of goals scored.
For deciding champions, qualification to UEFA Europa League and relegation: 1st points; 2nd head-to-head points; 3rd head-to-head goal difference; 4th head-to-head away goals scored
(R) Relegated

==== Results summary ====
Overall								Home						Away					
Pld	W	D	L	GF	GA	GD	Pts	W	D	L	GF	GA	GD	W	D	L	GF	GA	GD
33	10	9	14	35	50	−15	39	7	5	5	21	23	−2	3	4	9	14	27	−13

Last updated: 26 May 2013.
Source: Sportnet.hr

==== Results by round ====
Round	1	2	3	4	5	6	7	8	9	10	11	12	13	14	15	16	17	18	19	20	21	22	23	24	25	26	27	28	29	30	31	32	33
Ground	A	H	A	H	A	H	A	H	A	A	H	H	A	H	A	H	A	H	A	H	H	A	H	H	A	H	A	H	A	H	A	H	A
Result	W	W	L	W	W	W	W	L	L	D	L	W	D	D	L	W	L	W	D	L	D	L	L	D	L	D	L	D	L	W	D	L	L
Position	1	1	4	3	2	2	2	2	2	2	2	2	2	4	6	4	6	5	5	6	6	6	6	6	6	6	6	6	8	6	7	7	8

Updated to match(es) played on 26 May 2013. Source: Competitive matches
A = Away; H = Home; W = Win; D = Draw; L = Loss

== Matches ==
=== Prva HNL ===
Round	Date	Venue	Opponent	Score	Attendance	Slaven Belupo Scorers	Report
1	22 Jul	A	Cibalia	3 – 0	1,000	Bubnjić, Rak (2)	Sportnet.hr
2	29 Jul	H	Istra 1961	3 – 1	1,000	Rak, Glavica, Delić	Sportnet.hr
3	5 Aug	A	RNK Split	0 – 2	800		Sportnet.hr
4	12 Aug	H	Zadar	2 – 0	1,500	Maras, Vugrinec	Sportnet.hr
5	17 Aug	A	NK Zagreb	2 – 1	700	Oršulić (o.g.), Grgić	Sportnet.hr
6	24 Aug	H	Lokomotiva	3 – 2	1,500	Vugrinec, Batarelo, Gregurina	Sportnet.hr
7	2 Sep	A	Osijek	2 – 1	2,000	Delić, Vugrinec	Sportnet.hr
8	16 Sep	H	Rijeka	1 – 3	2,500	Vugrinec	Sportnet.hr
9	23 Sep	A	Hajduk Split	1 – 3	8,000	Bušić	Sportnet.hr
10	29 Sep	A	Inter Zaprešić	2 – 2	500	Vugrinec, Glavica	Sportnet.hr
11	7 Oct	H	Dinamo Zagreb	1 – 4	2,400	Delić	Sportnet.hr
12	20 Oct	H	Cibalia	2 – 1	1,800	Vugrinec (2)	Sportnet.hr
13	26 Oct	A	Istra 1961	0 – 0	2,000		Sportnet.hr
14	3 Nov	H	RNK Split	2 – 2	1,500	Vugrinec, Čanađija	Sportnet.hr
15	10 Nov	A	Zadar	0 – 1	1,000		Sportnet.hr
16	17 Nov	H	NK Zagreb	1 – 0	1,000	Čanađija	Sportnet.hr
17	23 Nov	A	Lokomotiva	1 – 3	200	Šaban	Sportnet.hr
18	1 Dec	H	Osijek	2 – 0	600	Čanađija, Glavica	Sportnet.hr
19	8 Dec	A	Rijeka	0 – 0	3,000		Sportnet.hr
20	16 Feb	H	Hajduk Split	0 – 2	1,500		Sportnet.hr
21	23 Feb	H	Inter Zaprešić	2 – 2	1,000	Rak, Purić	Sportnet.hr
22	2 Mar	A	Dinamo Zagreb	0 – 3	2,500		Sportnet.hr
23	9 Mar	H	Cibalia	0 – 2	1,000		Sportnet.hr
24	15 Mar	H	Osijek	0 – 0	650		Sportnet.hr
25	29 Mar	A	Rijeka	1 – 2	2,500	Novinić	Sportnet.hr
26	6 Apr	H	RNK Split	0 – 0	650		Sportnet.hr
27	13 Apr	A	Lokomotiva	1 – 5	500	Barić	Sportnet.hr
28	20 Apr	H	Hajduk Split	1 – 1	2,500	Delić	Sportnet.hr
29	27 Apr	A	Dinamo Zagreb	0 – 1	1,000		Sportnet.hr
30	4 May	H	Istra 1961	1 – 0	1,000	Čanađija	Sportnet.hr
31	11 May	A	Zadar	1 – 1	1,000	Glavica	Sportnet.hr
32	18 May	H	NK Zagreb	0 – 3	1,500		Sportnet.hr
33	26 May	A	Inter Zaprešić	0 – 2	800		Sportnet.hr

=== Europa League ===
Round	Date	Venue	Opponent	Score	Attendance	Slaven Belupo Scorers	Report
QR2	19 Jul	H	Portadown (Northern Ireland)	6 – 0	2,338	Breen (o.g.), Bušić (2), Rak (3)	Sportnet.hr
QR2	26 Jul	A (Northern Ireland)	Portadown (Northern Ireland)	4 – 2	393	Bubnjić, Brlek, Šaban (2)	Sportnet.hr
QR3	2 Aug	A (Spain)	Athletic Bilbao (Spain)	1 – 3	28,000	Delić	Sportnet.hr
QR3	9 Aug	H	Athletic Bilbao (Spain)	2 – 1	3,407	Maras, Gregurina	Sportnet.hr

=== Croatian Cup ===
Round	Date	Venue	Opponent	Score	Attendance	Slaven Belupo Scorers	Report
R1	26 Sep	A	Ivančica	2 – 1	600	Bušić (2)	Sportnet.hr
R2	30 Oct	H	Koprivnica	2 – 0 (a.e.t.)	500	Maras, Delić	Sportnet.hr
QF	20 Nov	A	Zadar	0 – 1	500		Sportnet.hr
QF	28 Nov	H	Zadar	3 – 1	1,500	Vugrinec, Šaban, Bubnjić	Sportnet.hr
SF	10 Apr	H	Hajduk Split	1 – 2	1,500	Vugrinec	Sportnet.hr
SF	17 Apr	A	Hajduk Split	1 – 1	12,000	Glavica	Sportnet.hr

== Player seasonal records ==
Competitive matches only. Updated to games played 26 May 2013.

=== Top scorers ===
Rank	Name	League	Europe	Cup	Total
1	(Croatia) Davor Vugrinec	8	–	2	10
2	(Croatia) Nikola Rak	4	3	–	7
3	(Croatia) Mateas Delić	4	1	1	6
4	(Croatia) Tomislav Bušić	1	2	2	5
4	(Croatia) Dejan Glavica	4	–	1	5
6	(Croatia) Dario Čanađija	4	–	–	4
6	(Croatia) Martin Šaban	1	2	1	4
8	(Croatia) Igor Bubnjić	1	1	1	3
8	(Croatia) Alen Maras	1	1	1	3
10	(Croatia) Mario Gregurina	1	1	–	2
11	(Croatia) Ante Batarelo	1	–	–	1
11	(Bosnia and Herzegovina) Mario Barić	1	–	–	1
11	(Croatia) Petar Brlek	–	1	–	1
11	(Croatia) Mato Grgić	1	–	–	1
11	(Croatia) Enes Novinić	1	–	–	1
11	(Croatia) Vedran Purić	1	–	–	1
	Own goals	1	1	–	2
	TOTALS	35	13	9	57

Source: Competitive matches

=== Appearances and goals ===
Number	Position	Player	Apps	Goals	Apps	Goals	Apps	Goals	Apps	Goals
Number	Position	Player	Total		1. HNL		Europa League		Croatian Cup	
1	GK	(Croatia) Tomislav Pelin	10	0	6+1	0	0+0	0	3+0	0
2	MF	(Croatia) Filip Takač	1	0	0+0	0	1+0	0	0+0	0
3	DF	(Bosnia and Herzegovina) Borislav Pilipović	14	0	6+5	0	0+2	0	0+1	0
4	DF	(Croatia) Elvis Kokalović	34	0	26+0	0	3+1	0	4+0	0
5	DF	(Croatia) Mato Grgić	33	1	22+2	1	1+3	0	5+0	0
6	DF	(Croatia) Igor Bubnjić	34	3	21+4	1	4+0	1	5+0	1
7	MF	(Croatia) Dario Čanađija	32	4	20+3	4	2+1	0	5+1	0
8	MF	(Croatia) Igor Jugović	9	0	7+1	0	0+0	0	1+0	0
8	FW	(Croatia) Tomislav Bušić	25	5	8+9	1	3+1	2	3+1	2
9	FW	(Croatia) Martin Šaban	28	4	8+13	1	1+2	2	3+1	1
10	MF	(Croatia) Petar Brlek	28	1	8+14	0	2+0	1	2+2	0
11	MF	(Croatia) Dejan Glavica	36	5	25+3	4	1+1	0	4+2	1
12	GK	(Croatia) Silvio Rodić	34	0	27+0	0	4+0	0	3+0	0
13	DF	(Bosnia and Herzegovina) Mario Barić	19	1	11+4	1	0+0	0	3+1	0
14	MF	(Croatia) Mateas Delić	39	6	26+4	4	4+0	1	4+1	1
15	FW	(Croatia) Davor Vugrinec	23	10	17+2	8	1+1	0	1+1	2
16	DF	(Croatia) Vedran Purić	30	1	23+0	1	3+0	0	4+0	0
17	MF	(Croatia) Matej Herent	5	0	2+3	0	0+0	0	0+0	0
18	FW	(Croatia) Mario Jelavić	10	0	3+5	0	0+0	0	0+2	0
18	DF	(Croatia) Marin Šestak	1	0	0+0	0	1+0	0	0+0	0
20	MF	(Croatia) Mario Gregurina	26	2	18+2	1	0+1	1	4+1	0
21	MF	(Croatia) Nikola Rak	26	7	18+3	4	3+0	3	2+0	0
22	FW	(Croatia) Enes Novinić	5	1	3+1	1	0+0	0	1+0	0
22	MF	(Croatia) Pejo Kuprešak	6	0	0+3	0	1+0	0	0+2	0
23	DF	(Croatia) Stjepan Geng	19	0	11+4	0	0+0	0	2+2	0
24	DF	(Croatia) Jurica Pranjić	10	0	8+1	0	0+0	0	0+1	0
26	DF	(Croatia) Alen Maras	37	3	24+5	1	4+0	1	4+0	1
30	MF	(Croatia) Ante Batarelo	24	1	16+2	1	4+0	0	2+0	0
