= 2012–13 in Croatian football =

Football in Croatia
- Season: 2012–13

Men's football
- Prva HNL: Dinamo Zagreb
- Druga HNL: Hrvatski Dragovoljac
- Treća HNL: Segesta
- Croatian Cup: Hajduk Split

2012–13 in Croatian football

First Division champions
- Dinamo Zagreb

Second Division champions
- Hrvatski Dragovoljac

Third Division champions
- Segesta (Center)

Croatian Cup winners
- Hajduk Split

Teams in Europe
- Dinamo Zagreb; Hajduk Split; Slaven Belupo; Osijek

Croatia national team
- 2014 FIFA World Cup qualification

The following article presents a summary of the 2012–13 football season in Croatia, which is the 22nd season of competitive football in the country.

== National teams ==
=== Croatia ===
Date	Venue	Opponents	Score	Croatia scorer(s)	Report
Friendly matches
15 August 2012	Stadion Poljud, Split (H)	Switzerland	2–4	Eduardo (2)	HNS-CFF.hr
6 February 2013	Craven Cottage, London (N)	South Korea	4–0	Mandžukić, Srna, Jelavić, Petrić	HNS-CFF.hr
10 June 2013	Stade de Genève, Geneva (N)	Portugal	0–1		HNS-CFF.hr
14 August 2013	Rheinpark Stadion, Vaduz (A)	Liechtenstein			
2014 FIFA World Cup qualification - Group stage
7 September 2012	Stadion Maksimir, Zagreb (H)	Macedonia	1–0	Jelavić	FIFA.com
11 September 2012	King Baudouin Stadium, Brussels (A)	Belgium	1–1	Perišić	FIFA.com
12 October 2012	Philip II Arena, Skopje (A)	Macedonia	2–1	Ćorluka, Rakitić	FIFA.com
16 October 2012	Stadion Gradski vrt, Osijek (H)	Wales	2–0	Mandžukić, Eduardo	FIFA.com
22 March 2013	Stadion Maksimir, Zagreb (H)	Serbia	2–0	Mandžukić, Olić	FIFA.com
26 March 2013	Liberty Stadium, Swansea (A)	Wales	2–1	Lovren, Eduardo	FIFA.com
7 June 2013	Stadion Maksimir, Zagreb (H)	Scotland	0–1		FIFA.com

=== Croatia U21 ===
Date	Venue	Opponents	Score	Croatia scorer(s)	Report
Friendly matches
29 May 2013	Igralište iza Vage, Metković (H)	Montenegro	0–0(6–7)		
2 June 2013	Estádio Municipal de Rio Maior, Rio Maior (A)	Portugal	0–2		
2013 UEFA European Under-21 Football Championship qualification - Group stage
15 August 2012	Mikheil Meskhi Stadium, Tbilisi (A)	Georgia	1–1	Kramarić	UEFA.com
10 September 2012	Estadio José Rico Pérez, Alicante (A)	Spain	0–6		UEFA.com

=== Croatia U20 ===
Date	Venue	Opponents	Score	Croatia scorer(s)	Report
Friendly matches
24 March 2013	Stadion Varteks, Varaždin (H)	Sweden	3–0	Rebić, Šitum, Livaja	HNS-CFF.hr
24 March 2013	Ajdovščina Football Stadium, Ajdovščina (A)	Slovenia	4–1	Datković, Čulina (2), Begonja	
18 June 2013	WOW Topkapi, Antalya (N)	Paraguay	1–2	Rebić	
2013 FIFA U-20 World Cup
23 June 2013	Atatürk Stadium, Bursa	Uruguay	1–0	Rebić	FIFA.com
26 June 2013	Atatürk Stadium, Bursa	Uzbekistan	1–1	Livaja	FIFA.com
29 June 2013	Atatürk Stadium, Bursa	New Zealand	2–1	Perica, Rebić	FIFA.com
3 July 2013	Atatürk Stadium, Bursa	Chile	0–2		FIFA.com

=== Croatia U19 ===
Date	Venue	Opponents	Score	Croatia scorer(s)	Report
2013 UEFA European Under-19 Football Championship qualifying round
26 October 2012	Stadion Lučko, Zagreb (H)	Georgia	2–0	Kiš, Ivančić	UEFA.com
28 October 2012	Sportski centar Rudeš, Zagreb (H)	Iceland	2–2	Traustason (OG), Ivančić	UEFA.com
31 October 2012	Stadion Sv. Josip Radnik, Sesvete (H)	Azerbaijan	7–1	Kiš (5), Ivančić, Brlek	UEFA.com
2013 UEFA European Under-19 Football Championship elite round
5 June 2013	Gdynski Osrodek Sportu i Rekre, Gdynia (N)	Greece	1–1	Kiš	UEFA.com
7 June 2013	Stadion Miejski im. Kazimierza Deyny, Starogard Gdański (N)	Poland	2–0	Ivančić, Alvir	UEFA.com
10 June 2013	Stadion Miejski im. Kazimierza Deyny, Starogard Gdański (N)	Spain	1–1	Brlek	UEFA.com

=== Croatia U17 ===
Date	Venue	Opponents	Score	Croatia scorer(s)	Report
Friendly matches
29 August 2012	Sportzentrum Schwaz, Schwaz (N)	Germany	3–1	Mamić (2), Roguljić	
31 August 2012	Zillertal Arena, Zell am Ziller (N)	Austria	1–1	Mamić	
2 September 2012	Sportzentrum Schwaz, Schwaz (N)	Slovakia	3–1	Roguljić, Prce, Štrkalj	
26 February 2013	Stadion Veli Jože, Poreč (H)	Republic of Ireland	2–1	Roguljić (2)	
28 February 2013	Stadion Umag, Umag (H)	Republic of Ireland	3–0	Dabar, Lulić, Brodić	
2013 UEFA European Under-17 Football Championship qualifying round
14 October 2012	Gradski stadion, Sinj (H)	Israel	4–2	Bašić (2), Brodić, Roguljić	UEFA.com
16 October 2012	Stadion Hrvatski vitezovi, Dugopolje (H)	Kazakhstan	2–0	Mamić, Bašić	UEFA.com
19 October 2012	Stadion Gospin dolac, Imotski (H)	Turkey	4–3	Murić, Fiolić, Roguljić, Krešić	UEFA.com
2013 UEFA European Under-17 Football Championship elite round
21 March 2013	Gradski stadion, Sinj (H)	Spain	3–2	Mamić, Bašić, Brodić	UEFA.com
23 March 2013	Stadion Hrvatski vitezovi, Dugopolje (H)	France	1–0	Coulibaly (o.g.)	UEFA.com
26 March 2013	Gradski stadion, Sinj (H)	Belgium	1–1	Ćaleta-Car	UEFA.com
2013 UEFA European Under-17 Football Championship
5 May 2013	Štadión pod Zoborom, Nitra	Italy	0–0		UEFA.com
8 May 2013	Štadión FC ViOn, Zlaté Moravce	Russia	0–0		UEFA.com
11 May 2013	Štadión FC ViOn, Zlaté Moravce	Ukraine	1–2	Halilović, Murić	UEFA.com

== League tables ==
=== Prva HNL ===
Pos	Team	Pld	W	D	L	GF	GA	GD	Pts	Qualification or relegation
1	Dinamo Zagreb (C)	33	24	5	4	68	20	+48	77	Qualification to Champions League second qualifying round
2	Lokomotiva	33	16	9	8	54	38	+16	57	Qualification to Europa League second qualifying round (Note: Hajduk Split qualify for 2013–14 Europa League Second qualifying round as winners of 2012–13 Croatian Cup.)
3	Rijeka	33	15	8	10	46	42	+4	53	Qualification to Europa League second qualifying round
4	Hajduk Split	33	14	10	9	45	31	+14	52	Qualification to Europa League second qualifying round
5	RNK Split	33	15	7	11	49	37	+12	52	
6	Istra 1961	33	11	11	11	35	32	+3	44	
7	Osijek	33	9	12	12	25	33	−8	39	
8	Slaven Belupo	33	10	9	14	35	50	−15	39	
9	Zadar	33	9	9	15	39	61	−22	36	
10	Inter Zaprešić (R)	33	8	11	14	36	41	−5	35	Relegation to Croatian Second Football League
11	Cibalia (R)	33	9	5	19	29	44	−15	32	Relegation to Croatian Second Football League
12	NK Zagreb (R)	33	7	6	20	28	60	−32	27	Relegation to Croatian Second Football League

Source: Sportnet.hr
Rules for classification: 1) points; 2) goal difference; 3) number of goals scored.
For deciding champions, qualification to UEFA Europa League and relegation: 1st points; 2nd head-to-head points; 3rd head-to-head goal difference; 4th head-to-head away goals scored
(C) Champions; (R) Relegated

=== Druga HNL ===
Pos	Team	Pld	W	D	L	GF	GA	GD	Pts	Promotion or relegation
1	Hrvatski Dragovoljac (C, P)	30	16	5	9	39	25	+14	53	Promotion to Croatian First Football League
2	Solin	30	14	9	7	43	39	+4	51	
3	Rudeš (Note: Rudeš were deducted 2 points after fielding an ineligible player in the penultimate round match against Gorica.)	30	14	8	8	47	30	+17	48	
4	Šibenik (Note: Šibenik were deducted 1 point after they fielded an ineligible player, 15-year-old Duje Ćaleta-Car, in the first round match against Radnik Sesvete. According to the competition rulebook, only players over age of 16 can play in a senior match.) (R)	30	13	10	7	42	31	+11	48	Relegation to Croatian Third Football League (Note: Šibenik were denied a license for competing in Druga HNL for the following season and were demoted to the third level.)
5	Vinogradar (R)	30	14	6	10	43	39	+4	48	Relegation to County Football League (Note: Vinogradar withdrew from competing in Druga HNL for the following season and were demoted to the fifth level.)
6	Zelina	30	13	7	10	46	30	+16	46	
7	Pomorac	30	13	7	10	50	38	+12	46	
8	Dugopolje	30	14	4	12	39	42	−3	46	
9	Lučko	30	12	9	9	31	28	+3	45	
10	Gorica	30	10	10	10	40	35	+5	40	
11	Radnik Sesvete	30	12	4	14	42	43	−1	40	
12	Mosor (R)	30	9	11	10	31	40	−9	38	Relegation to Croatian Third Football League
13	Junak (R)	30	10	6	14	34	43	−9	36	Relegation to Croatian Third Football League
14	Imotski (R)	30	9	4	17	26	41	−15	31	Relegation to Croatian Third Football League
15	Primorac 1929 (R)	30	6	10	14	25	43	−18	28	Relegation to Croatian Third Football League
16	HAŠK (R)	30	3	6	21	24	55	−31	15	Relegation to Croatian Third Football League

Source: Druga-HNL.hr, Sportnet.hr (in Croatian)
Rules for classification: 1st points; 2nd goal difference; 3rd goals scored
For deciding champion, promotion and relegation: 1st points; 2nd head-to-head points; 3rd head-to-head goal difference; 4th head-to-head away goals scored
(C) Champions; (P) Promoted; (R) Relegated

== Croatian clubs in Europe ==
=== Summary ===
Club	Competition	Starting round	Final round	Matches played
Dinamo Zagreb	UEFA Champions League	Second qualifying round		12
Hajduk Split	UEFA Europa League	Second qualifying round	Third qualifying round	4
Slaven Belupo	UEFA Europa League	Second qualifying round	Third qualifying round	4
Osijek	UEFA Europa League	First qualifying round	Second qualifying round	4

=== Dinamo Zagreb ===
Date	Venue	Opponents	Score	Dinamo scorer(s)	Report
2012–13 Champions League - Second qualifying round
18 July 2012	Ludogorets Arena, Razgrad (A)	(Bulgaria) Ludogorets Razgrad	1–1	Rukavina	UEFA.com
25 July 2012	Stadion Maksimir, Zagreb (H)	(Bulgaria) Ludogorets Razgrad	3–2	Rukavina (2), Vida	UEFA.com
2012–13 Champions League - Third qualifying round
1 August 2012	Sheriff Stadium, Tiraspol (A)	(Moldova) Sheriff Tiraspol	1–0	Bećiraj	UEFA.com
8 August 2012	Stadion Maksimir, Zagreb (H)	(Moldova) Sheriff Tiraspol	4–0	Vida, Bećiraj, Čop, Ibáñez	UEFA.com
2012–13 Champions League - Play-off round
22 August 2012	Stadion Maksimir, Zagreb (H)	(Slovenia) Maribor	2–1	Čop, Badelj	UEFA.com
28 August 2012	Ljudski vrt, Maribor (A)	(Slovenia) Maribor	1–0	Tonel	UEFA.com
2012–13 Champions League - Group stage
18 September 2012	Stadion Maksimir, Zagreb (H)	(Portugal) Porto	0–2		UEFA.com
3 October 2012	NSK Olimpiyskiy, Kyiv (A)	(Ukraine) Dynamo Kyiv	0–2		UEFA.com
24 October 2012	Stadion Maksimir, Zagreb (H)	(France) Paris Saint-Germain	0–2		UEFA.com
6 November 2012	Parc des Princes, Paris (A)	(France) Paris Saint-Germain	0–4		UEFA.com
21 November 2012	Estádio do Dragão, Porto (A)	(Portugal) Porto	0–3		UEFA.com
4 December 2012	Stadion Maksimir, Zagreb (H)	(Ukraine) Dynamo Kyiv	1–1	Ivan Krstanović	UEFA.com

=== Hajduk Split ===
Date	Venue	Opponents	Score	Hajduk scorer(s)	Report
2012–13 Europa League - Second qualifying round
19 July 2012	Poljud, Split (H)	(Latvia) Skonto Riga	2–0	Vukušić, Trebotić	UEFA.com
26 July 2012	Skonto Stadium, Riga (A)	(Latvia) Skonto Riga	0–1		UEFA.com
2012–13 Europa League - Third qualifying round
2 August 2012	Poljud, Split (H)	(Italy) Internazionale	0–3		UEFA.com
9 August 2012	San Siro, Milan (A)	(Italy) Internazionale	2–0	Vukušić, Vuković	UEFA.com

=== Slaven Belupo ===
Date	Venue	Opponents	Score	Slaven scorer(s)	Report
2012–13 Europa League - Second qualifying round
19 July 2012	Gradski stadion, Koprivnica (H)	(Northern Ireland) Portadown	6–0	Breen (o.g.), Bušić (2), Rak (3)	UEFA.com
26 July 2012	Shamrock Park, Portadown (A)	(Northern Ireland) Portadown	4–2	Bubnjić, Brlek, Šaban (2)	UEFA.com
2012–13 Europa League - Third qualifying round
2 August 2012	San Mamés Stadium, Bilbao (A)	(Spain) Athletic Bilbao	1–3	Delić	UEFA.com
9 August 2012	Gradski stadion, Koprivnica (H)	(Spain) Athletic Bilbao	2–1	Maras, Gregurina	UEFA.com

=== Osijek ===
Date	Venue	Opponents	Score	Osijek scorer(s)	Report
2012–13 Europa League - First qualifying round
5 July 2012	Estadi Comunal, Andorra la Vella (A)	(Andorra) FC Santa Coloma	1–0	Miličević	UEFA.com
12 July 2012	Stadion Gradski vrt, Osijek (H)	(Andorra) FC Santa Coloma	3–1	Kvržić, Perošević, Jugović	UEFA.com
2012–13 Europa League - Second qualifying round
19 July 2012	Stadion Gradski vrt, Osijek (H)	(Sweden) Kalmar	1–3	Miličević	UEFA.com
26 July 2012	Guldfågeln Arena, Kalmar (A)	(Sweden) Kalmar	0–3		UEFA.com
