= 2013–14 NK Hrvatski Dragovoljac season =

Hrvatski Dragovoljac
2013–14 season
- Chairman: Ivica Perković
- Manager: Krešimir Ganjto
- Stadium: Stadion NŠC Stjepan Spajić
- Prva HNL: 10th (relegated)
Home colours	Away colours

The 2013–14 season is Hrvatski Dragovoljac's first season back in the Prva HNL since their promotion in 2012. This article shows player statistics and all official matches that the club will play during the 2013–14 season.

Hrvatski Dragovoljac finished 10th in the final league standings and were relegated.

== Squad ==
Note: Flags indicate national team as defined under FIFA eligibility rules; some limited exceptions apply. Players may hold more than one non-FIFA nationality.

No.	Pos.	Nation	Player
1	GK	CRO	Ivan Čović (captain)
3	DF	CRO	Nikola Eller
4	DF	CRO	Davor Špehar
5	DF	CRO	Tomislav Mrčela
6	DF	CRO	Dino Kluk
7	MF	CRO	Marin Jakšinić
8	MF	CRO	Krešo Ljubičić (on loan from Hajduk Split)
9	FW	CRO	Danijel Zlatar
10	FW	CRO	Mario Rašić
11	MF	CRO	Grgo Živković
12	GK	CRO	Ante Topić
13	MF	CRO	Šime Gregov
14	MF	CRO	Filip Jazvić
15	FW	CRO	Jan Doležal
17	DF	BIH	Dario Tomić
19	MF	CRO	Marko Brtan
20	MF	CRO	Renato Meglaj

No.	Pos.	Nation	Player
21	FW	CRO	Ilija Sivonjić
22	FW	CRO	Sven Jajčinović
23	DF	BIH	Ivan Mršić
24	DF	CRO	Mislav Komorski
25	DF	CRO	Eduard Husinec
26	GK	CRO	Martin Arežina
27	FW	CRO	Ivan Babić
—	GK	CRO	Tomislav Pušeljić
—	GK	CRO	Toni Šušković
—	DF	CRO	Ante Bulat
—	MF	CRO	Deni Bektaši
—	MF	CRO	Mario Ćubel
—	MF	CRO	Danijel Franješ
—	MF	CRO	Hrvoje Jurina
—	MF	CRO	Mateo Mužek
—	MF	CRO	Edo Štefanec
—	MF	CRO	Ivan Todorić

== Competitions ==
=== Prva HNL ===
==== Results summary ====
Overall								Home						Away					
Pld	W	D	L	GF	GA	GD	Pts	W	D	L	GF	GA	GD	W	D	L	GF	GA	GD
36	7	9	20	41	61	−20	30	5	4	9	21	27	−6	2	5	11	20	34	−14

==== Results ====
13 July 2013 1	Hrvatski Dragovoljac	0–2	Lokomotiva	Zagreb
20:00		Summary	Šitum 30'; Čović 49' (o.g.)	Stadium: Stadion NŠC Stjepan Spajić; Attendance: 1,800; Referee: Fran Jović (Zagreb)

20 July 2013 2	Slaven Belupo	2–2	Hrvatski Dragovoljac	Koprivnica
20:00	Purić 56'; Delić 79'	Summary	Jazvić 18'; Sivonjić 90+2'	Stadium: Gradski stadion Attendance: 1,500; Referee: Ivo Krečak (Šibenik)

26 July 2013 3	Hrvatski Dragovoljac	0–1	Istra 1961	Zagreb
21:15	Brtan (yellow card) 63' (yellow-red card)	Summary	Radonjić 34'; Jô (yellow card) 42'	Stadium: Stadion NŠC Stjepan Spajić; Attendance: 1,800; Referee: Domagoj Vučkov (Rijeka)

4 August 2013 4	Hajduk Split	2–1	Hrvatski Dragovoljac	Split
21:00	Andrijašević 20', 66'	Summary	Zlatar 74'	Stadium: Stadion Poljud; Attendance: 9,000; Referee: Marin Vidulin (Kanfanar)

10 August 2013 5	Hrvatski Dragovoljac	1–1	Dinamo Zagreb	Zagreb
21:00	Doležal 66'	Summary	Soudani 65'; Ademi (yellow card) 67'	Stadium: Stadion Kranjčevićeva; Attendance: 2,000; Referee: Igor Pristovnik (Zagreb)

18 August 2013 6	Zadar	1–1	Hrvatski Dragovoljac	Zadar
19:00	Ante Sarić 21'; Surać (yellow card) 84'	Summary	Kluk (yellow card) 18'; Jan Doležal 26' (yellow card) 72'; Sven Jajčinović (yellow card) 34'; Davor Špehar (yellow card) 41'	Stadium: Stadion Stanovi; Attendance: 2,800

25 August 2013 7	Hrvatski Dragovoljac	0–2	Rijeka	Zagreb
19:00		Summary	Mujanović 22'; Zlomislić (yellow card) 29'; Bertoša (yellow card) 38'; Pokrivač 76'	Stadium: Stadion NŠC Stjepan Spajić; Attendance: 1,200; Referee: (Croatia) Tihomir Pejin

30 August 2013 8	RNK Split	1–0	Hrvatski Dragovoljac	Split
20:15	Križanac (yellow card) 69'; Belle 74'; Bilić (yellow card) 75'	Summary	Leopold Novak (yellow card) 80'	Stadium: Stadion Park mladeži Attendance: 500; Referee: (Croatia) Ivan Krečak

13 September 2013 9	Hrvatski Dragovoljac	1–0	Osijek	Zagreb
18:00	Dario Tomić (yellow card) 26'; Filip Jazvić 65'; Stipe Bačelić-Grgić (yellow card) 73'; Kluk (yellow card) 90'	Summary	Matija Mišić (yellow card) 16'; Hrvoje Kurtović (yellow card) 45'; Valentin Babic (yellow card) 58'; Novaković (yellow card) 72'	Stadium: Stadion NŠC Stjepan Spajić; Attendance: 800; Referee: (Croatia) Domagoj Vučkov

20 September 2013 10	Lokomotiva	2–1	Hrvatski Dragovoljac	Zagreb
18:00	Ivan Lendrić 47'; Ante Budimir 90+3'	Summary	Stipe Bačelić-Grgić 25'	Stadium: Stadion Maksimir; Attendance: 300; Referee: (Croatia) Igor Pristovnik

28 September 2013 11	Hrvatski Dragovoljac	0–0	Slaven Belupo	Zagreb
17:00	Jan Doležal (yellow card) 47'; Sven Jajčinović (yellow card) 69'; Marko Brtan (yellow card) 70'	Summary	Grgić (yellow card) 13' (yellow-red card); Purić (yellow card) 21' (yellow-red card); Ljuban Crepulja (yellow card) 31'; Novinić (yellow card) 52'	Stadium: Stadion NŠC Stjepan Spajić; Attendance: 500; Referee: (Croatia) Igor Križarić

6 October 2013 12	Istra 1961	2–1	Hrvatski Dragovoljac	Pula
15:00	Blagojević 10' (yellow card) 69'; Radonjić 28'; Franjić (yellow card) 42'; Chung Woon (yellow card) 89'	Summary	Danijel Zlatar (yellow card) 54'; Grgo Živković (red card) 55'; Jan Doležal (yellow card) 56'; Stipe Bačelić-Grgić 84' (pen.)	Stadium: Stadion Aldo Drosina; Attendance: 1,500; Referee: (Croatia) Goran Gabrilo

20 October 2013 13	Hrvatski Dragovoljac	1–2	Hajduk Split	Zagreb
20:00	Kluk (yellow card) 21'; Ivan Mršić (yellow card) 33'; Sivonjić 40'; Komorski (yellow card) 68'	Summary	Bukva (yellow card) 39'; Bencun 59', 90+2' (yellow card) 59'	Stadium: Stadion NŠC Stjepan Spajić; Attendance: 4,500; Referee: (Croatia) Zlatko Šimčić

27 October 2013 14	Dinamo Zagreb	4–1	Hrvatski Dragovoljac	Zagreb
16:00	Soudani 4'; Fernándes 8'; Brozović 53'; Šimunović (yellow card) 65' (red card) 90'; Čop 76'	Summary	Stipe Bačelić-Grgić 66' (pen.)	Stadium: Stadion Maksimir; Attendance: 3,600; Referee: (Croatia) Fran Jović

4 November 2013 15	Hrvatski Dragovoljac	0–2	Zadar	Zagreb
19:00	Ljubičić (yellow card) 82'	Summary	Marin Oršulić 37'; Ivan Vasilj 63'; Ante Sarić (yellow card) 88'	Stadium: Stadion NŠC Stjepan Spajić; Attendance: 900; Referee: (Croatia) Damir Batinić

24 November 2013 17	Hrvatski Dragovoljac	2–2	RNK Split	Zagreb
16:00	Jan Doležal 52'; Davor Špehar 82'; Mario Rašić (yellow card) 84'; Danijel Zlatar (yellow card) 90'	Summary	Davor Špehar 28' (o.g.); Erceg 74' (yellow card) 74'; Ibriks (yellow card) 81'; Radotić (yellow card) 84'; Belle (yellow card) 90'	Stadium: Stadion NŠC Stjepan Spajić; Attendance: 500; Referee: (Croatia) Ante Vučemilović

29 November 2013 18	Osijek	1–1	Hrvatski Dragovoljac	Osijek
19:00	Antonio Pavić (yellow card) 38'; Mile Škorić 79'	Summary	Sivonjić 58'; Ivan Čović (yellow card) 90+2'	Stadium: Stadion Gradski vrt Attendance: 800; Referee: (Croatia) Marin Vidulin

4 December 2013 16	Rijeka	2–0	Hrvatski Dragovoljac	Rijeka
21:00	Maleš (yellow card) 35'; Sharbini (yellow card) 66'; Benko 72', 80' (yellow card) 73'; Datković (yellow card) 86'; Mujanović (yellow card) 90'	Summary	Ljubičić (yellow card) 53'	Stadium: Stadion Kantrida; Attendance: 3,000; Referee: (Croatia) Igor Križarić

7 December 2013 19	Hrvatski Dragovoljac	1–3	Lokomotiva	Zagreb
19:00	Sven Jajčinović (yellow card) 17'; Grgo Živković (yellow card) 42'; Danijel Zlatar 48'; Ljubičić (yellow card) 56'; Dario Tomić (yellow card) 67'; Davor Špehar (yellow card) 90'; Sivonjić (yellow card) 90'	Summary	Herdi Prenga 31', 90+2'; Šovšić 53'	Stadium: Stadion NŠC Stjepan Spajić; Attendance: 300; Referee: (Croatia) Igor Pristovnik

13 December 2013 20	Slaven Belupo	1–1	Hrvatski Dragovoljac	Koprivnica
18:00	Brlek 47'; Rak (yellow card) 56'	Summary	Mario Rašić 71'	Stadium: Gradski stadion (Koprivnica); Attendance: 500; Referee: (Croatia) Andrej Burilo

9 February 2014 21	Hrvatski Dragovoljac	1–2	Istra 1961	Zagreb
15:00	Kluk (yellow card) 26'; Dario Tomić (yellow card) 66'; Danijel Zlatar 70'	Summary	Budicin 14'; Blagojević (yellow card) 62'; Obšivač 79'; Havojić (yellow card) 88'	Stadium: Stadion NŠC Stjepan Spajić; Attendance: 500; Referee: (Croatia) Luka Klaić

14 February 2014 22	Hajduk Split	2–1	Hrvatski Dragovoljac	Split
18:00	Pašalić 46' (yellow card) 88'; Milić 61'	Summary	Danijel Zlatar (yellow card) 40'; Mrčela 90+3'	Stadium: Stadion Poljud; Attendance: 6,000; Referee: (Croatia) Domagoj Vučkov

21 February 2014 23	Hrvatski Dragovoljac	0–1	Dinamo Zagreb	Zagreb
18:00	Zoran Lesjak (yellow card) 13'; Mario Rašić (yellow card) 35'; Grgo Živković (yellow card) 81'	Summary	Leko (yellow card) 45'; Šimunić 63'	Stadium: Stadion NŠC Stjepan Spajić; Attendance: 2,000; Referee: (Croatia) Fran Jović

28 February 2014 24	Zadar	0–4	Hrvatski Dragovoljac	Zadar
18:00	Ivan Šimurina (yellow card) 38'; Igor Banović (yellow card) 81'; Ante Sarić (yellow card) 90'	Summary	Ljubičić 4' (yellow card) 15'; Dario Tomić (yellow card) 21'; Jan Doležal 35' (yellow card) 51' (yellow-red card); Danijel Zlatar (yellow card) 38'; Ivan Čović (yellow card) 45'; Ivan Šimurina 80' (o.g.); Filip Jazvić 82'	Stadium: Stadion Stanovi; Attendance: 800; Referee: (Croatia) Duje Strukan

7 March 2014 25	Hrvatski Dragovoljac	0–2	Rijeka	Zagreb
18:00	Filip Jazvić (yellow card) 79'; Davor Špehar (yellow card) 83'	Summary	Moisés 15'; Kramarić 17'; Bertoša (yellow card) 82'	Stadium: Stadion NŠC Stjepan Spajić; Attendance: 1,800; Referee: (Croatia) Domagoj Ljubičić

14 March 2014 26	RNK Split	2–1	Hrvatski Dragovoljac	Split
18:00	Belle 30'; Dujmović (yellow card) 68'; Vojnović (yellow card) 72'; Erceg (yellow card) 80' (goal) 81'	Summary	Jan Doležal (yellow card) 35'; Ivan Mršić (yellow card) 37'; Stipe Bačelić-Grgić 44'	Stadium: Stadion Park mladeži Attendance: 500; Referee: (Croatia) Domagoj Vučkov

23 March 2014 27	Hrvatski Dragovoljac	2–0	Osijek	Zagreb
19:00	Filip Jazvić 18', 68'; Šime Gregov (yellow card) 47'; Davor Špehar (yellow card) 80'	Summary	Novaković (yellow card) 24'; Matej Jonjić (yellow card) 77'	Stadium: Stadion NŠC Stjepan Spajić; Attendance: 1,000; Referee: (Croatia) Bruno Marić

29 March 2014 28	Lokomotiva	2–1	Hrvatski Dragovoljac	Zagreb
19:00	Šitum 4'; Luka Begonja (yellow card) 28'; Chago (yellow card) 40'; Toni Gorupec (yellow card) 69'; Ante Budimir 73'	Summary	Zoran Lesjak (yellow card) 48'; Stipe Bačelić-Grgić 86'; Mrčela (yellow card) 90'	Stadium: Stadion Maksimir; Attendance: 550; Referee: (Croatia) Ivan Bebek

5 April 2014 29	Hrvatski Dragovoljac	3–3	Slaven Belupo	Zagreb
16:00	Filip Jazvić (yellow card) 38'; Mrčela (yellow card) 44'; Ivan Božić 50' 74' (pen.); Stipe Bačelić-Grgić 55' (yellow card) 77'; Davor Špehar (yellow card) 66'	Summary	Glavina 6', 30'; Vugrinec 45+1' (pen.); Pranjić (yellow card) 59' (yellow-red card)	Stadium: Stadion NŠC Stjepan Spajić; Attendance: 300; Referee: (Croatia) Goran Gabrilo

13 April 2014 30	Istra 1961	1–2	Hrvatski Dragovoljac	Pula
16:00	Dejan Radonjić 82'	Summary	Stipe Bačelić-Grgić 49'; Sven Jajčinović 81'	Stadium: Stadion Aldo Drosina

16 April 2014 31	Hrvatski Dragovoljac	4–1	Hajduk Split	Zagreb
18:00	Mrčela 3'; Jan Doležal 24'; Ivan Božić (yellow card) 43'; Stipe Bačelić-Grgić (yellow card) 49'; Dario Tomić 69' (yellow card) 70'; Davor Špehar (yellow card) 73'; Ivan Čović (yellow card) 85'; Mario Rašić 90+2'	Summary	Pašalić (yellow card) 41'; Maloča (yellow card) 70'; Vršajević (yellow card) 72'; Davor Špehar 85' (o.g.)	Stadium: Stadion NŠC Stjepan Spajić; Attendance: 2,000; Referee: (Croatia) Mario Zebec

22 April 2014 32	Dinamo Zagreb	5–0	Hrvatski Dragovoljac	Zagreb
18:00	Pavičić (yellow card) 26' (goal) 28'; Čop 50' (yellow card) 82'; Soudani 62'; Halilović 64'; Husejinović 90+1'	Summary	Zoran Lesjak (yellow card) 77'	Stadium: Stadion Maksimir; Attendance: 1,600; Referee: (Croatia) Fran Jović

27 April 2014 33	Hrvatski Dragovoljac	2–1	Zadar	Zagreb
16:00	Ivan Božić 18' (yellow card) 27'; Davor Špehar (yellow card) 30'; Zoran Lesjak (yellow card) 87'; Stipe Bačelić-Grgić 90+1' (yellow card) 90'; Ljubičić (yellow card) 90+3'	Summary	Jerbić (yellow card) 29'; Hrgović (yellow card) 33'; Weitzer 59' (yellow card) 88'; Ante Sarić (yellow card) 65'	Stadium: Stadion NŠC Stjepan Spajić; Attendance: 500; Referee: (Croatia) Marin Vidulin

2 May 2014 34	Rijeka	3–1	Hrvatski Dragovoljac	Rijeka
19:00	Krstanović 19' (pen.); Brezovec (yellow card) 31'; Kramarić 54'; Lešković 60'; Mujanović (yellow card) 83'	Summary	Zoran Lesjak (yellow card) 17'; Ivan Božić (yellow card) 45+1'; Sven Jajčinović 68'; Ljubičić (yellow card) 90+1'	Stadium: Stadion Kantrida; Attendance: 3,800; Referee: (Croatia) Duje Strukan

9 May 2014 35	Hrvatski Dragovoljac	3–2	RNK Split	Zagreb
19:00	Stipe Bačelić-Grgić 27' (pen.) 85'; Dario Tomić (yellow card) 56'; Šime Gregov (yellow card) 59'; Ivan Čović (yellow card) 71'; Jan Doležal 76' (pen.)	Summary	Glumac (red card) 26'; Kvesić (yellow card) 38'; Miloš Vidović (yellow card) 55'; Zagorac (yellow card) 55'; Bilić 71' (pen.); Erceg 74' (yellow card) 82'; Vojnović (yellow card) 76'	Stadium: Stadion NŠC Stjepan Spajić; Attendance: 1,500; Referee: (Croatia) Ivan Krečak

17 May 2014 36	Osijek	1–1	Hrvatski Dragovoljac	Osijek
19:00	Matas (yellow card) 16'; Borna Barišić 83'; Ugarković (yellow card) 87'	Summary	Ivan Božić 20' (yellow card) 90+3'; Šime Gregov (yellow card) 32'; Ivan Čović (yellow card) 45'	Stadium: Stadion Gradski vrt Attendance: 6,500; Referee: (Croatia) Bruno Marić

==== Table ====
Pos	Team	Pld	W	D	L	GF	GA	GD	Pts	Qualification or relegation
6	Istra 1961	36	12	8	16	45	56	−11	44	
7	Zadar	36	10	5	21	35	67	−32	35	
8	Osijek	36	8	9	19	38	62	−24	33	
9	Slaven Belupo (O)	36	7	11	18	46	65	−19	32	Qualification to relegation play-off
10	Hrvatski Dragovoljac (R)	36	7	9	20	41	61	−20	30	Relegation to Croatian Second Football League

Source: Sportnet.hr
Rules for classification: 1) points; 2) goal difference; 3) number of goals scored.
For deciding champions, qualification to UEFA Europa League and relegation: 1st points; 2nd head-to-head points; 3rd head-to-head goal difference; 4th head-to-head away goals scored
(O) Play-off winners; (R) Relegated
