= 2013–14 FK Željezničar season =

Željezničar
2013–14 season
- President: Almir Gredić
- Manager: Hajrudin Đurbuzović
- Stadium: Grbavica Stadium
- Premijer Liga BiH: 6
- Kup BiH: Round of 32
- UEFA Champions League: Second qualifying round
- Top goalscorer: League: Adilović; Selimović (2); All: Selimović (3)
- Highest home attendance: 3,000 vs Travnik
- Lowest home attendance: 3,000 vs Travnik

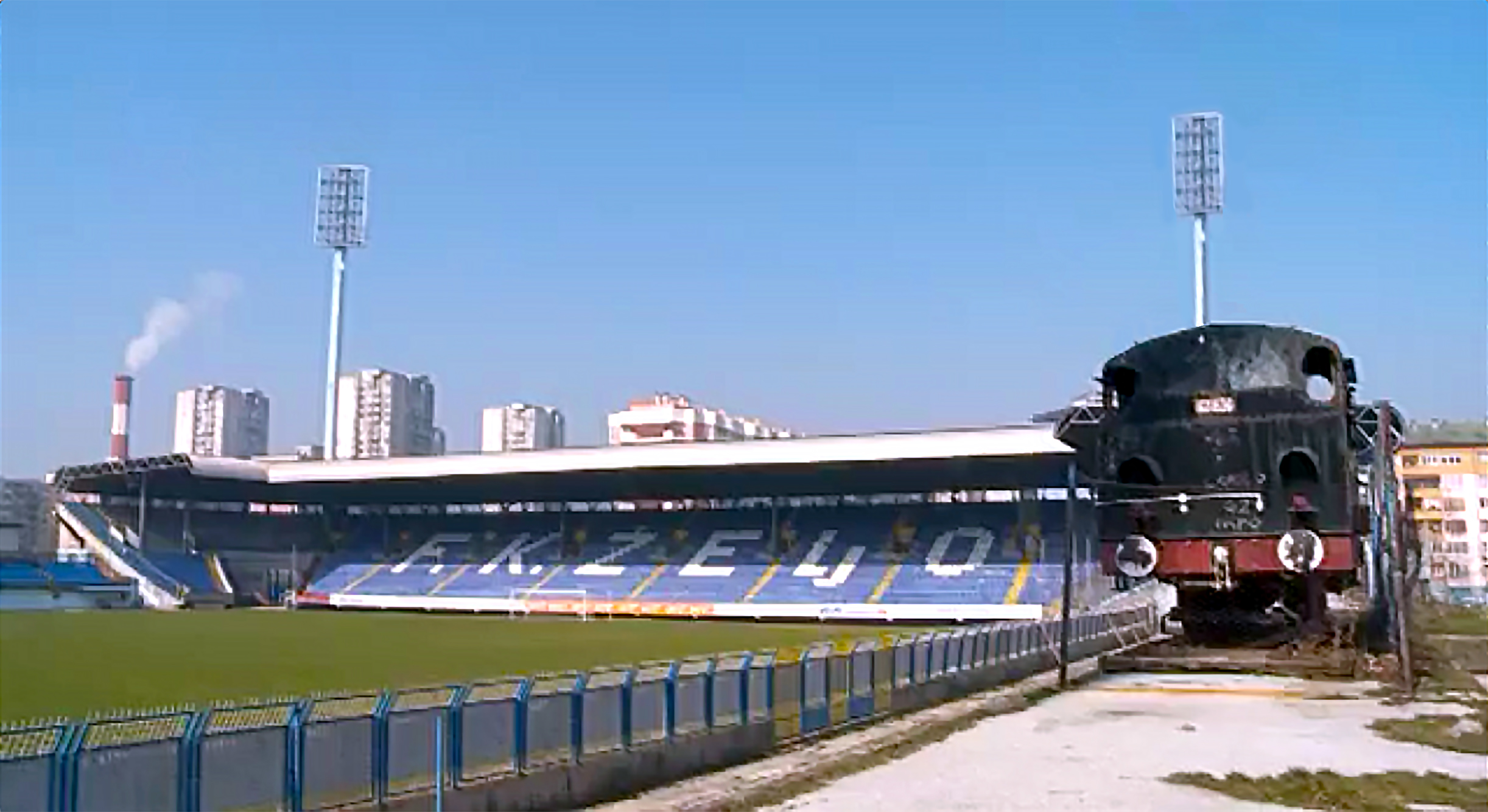
Locomotive is symbol of the club

== 2013–14 statistics ==
=== Squad information ===
N	Pos.	Nat.	Name	Age	EU	Since	App	Goals	Ends	Transfer fee	Notes
1	GK	(Bosnia and Herzegovina)	Adnan Hadžić	38	Non-EU	2013	9	0	2015	Free	
2	MF	(Bosnia and Herzegovina)	Elvir Čolić	40	EU	2010	5	1	2014	Free	Second nationality: Slovenia
3	DF	(Bosnia and Herzegovina)	Josip Kvesić	36	EU	2011	0	0	2015	Free	Second nationality: Croatia
4	FW	(Bosnia and Herzegovina)	Danijal Brković	35	Non-EU	2012	1	0	2014	Free	Second nationality: USA
5	DF	(Bosnia and Herzegovina)	Semir Kerla	39	Non-EU	2012 (Winter)	8	1	2014	Free	
6	DF	(Bosnia and Herzegovina)	Asim Škaljić	45	Non-EU	2013	4	0	2015	Free	
7	MF	(Bosnia and Herzegovina)	Sead Bučan	45	Non-EU	2013	6	2	2014	Free	
8	MF	(Bosnia and Herzegovina)	Nermin Zolotić	32	Non-EU	2010	0	0	2014	Youth system	
11	MF	(Bosnia and Herzegovina)	Srđan Stanić	37	EU	2007	7	0	2015	Free	Second nationality: Croatia
13	GK	(Bosnia and Herzegovina)	Vedran Kjosevski	31	Non-EU	2013	0	0	2018	Youth system	
15	FW	(Bosnia and Herzegovina)	Armin Hodžić	31	Non-EU	2013	8	0	2014	Youth system	Loan
16	FW	(Bosnia and Herzegovina)	Vernes Selimović	43	Non-EU	2011	9	3	2013	Free	
17	DF	(Bosnia and Herzegovina)	Benjamin Čolić	35	Non-EU	2009	1	0	2015	Youth system	
18	DF	(Bosnia and Herzegovina)	Emrah Hasanhodžić	33	Non-EU	2012	1	0	2014	Youth system	
19	MF	(Bosnia and Herzegovina)	Enis Sadiković	36	Non-EU	2013	2	0	TBD	Free	
20	MF	(Bosnia and Herzegovina)	Damir Sadiković	31	Non-EU	2013 (Winter)	3	0	2016	Youth system	
21	DF	(Serbia)	Mladen Zeljković	38	Non-EU	2013	9	0	2015	Free	
23	MF	(Bosnia and Herzegovina)	Muamer Svraka	38	Non-EU	2009	7	1	2015	Youth system	
24	MF	(Bosnia and Herzegovina)	Nermin Jamak	40	Non-EU	2011 (Winter)	9	1	2015	Free	Originally from youth system
25	MF	(Croatia)	Tomislav Tomić	35	EU	2012	8	1	2014	Free	Second nationality: Bosnia and Herzegovina
26	FW	(Bosnia and Herzegovina)	Dženan Zajmović	31	Non-EU	2013	0	0	TBD	Youth system	
27	GK	(Croatia)	Filip Lončarić	40	EU	2013	1	0	2014	Free	
37	FW	(Bosnia and Herzegovina)	Riad Bajić	32	Non-EU	2013	5	0	2018	Youth system	
44	MF	(Bosnia and Herzegovina)	Eldar Hasanović	36	Non-EU	2012	3	0	2015	Free	Originally from youth system
85	DF	(North Macedonia)	Yani Urdinov	35	Non-EU	2013 (Winter)	8	0	2014	Free	Second nationality: Belgium
—	DF	(Bosnia and Herzegovina)	Faris Fejzić	34	Non-EU	2013	0	0	2014	Free	
—	DF	(Bosnia and Herzegovina)	Safet Nadarević	46	Non-EU	2013	0	0	TBD	Free	

- Last updated: 14 September 2013
- Source: FKŽeljezničar.com and Footballdatabase.com (for EU passport)

Total squad cost: €5.775.000

=== Disciplinary record ===
Includes all competitive matches. The list is sorted by position, and then shirt number.

N	P	Nat.	Name	League			Cup			Europe			Others			Total			Notes
N	P	Nat.	Name	Yellow card	Second yellow card	Red card	Yellow card	Second yellow card	Red card	Yellow card	Second yellow card	Red card	Yellow card	Second yellow card	Red card	Yellow card	Second yellow card	Red card	Notes
1	GK	(Bosnia and Herzegovina)	Adnan Hadžić	1												1			
13	GK	(Bosnia and Herzegovina)	Vedran Kjosevski																
27	GK	(Croatia)	Filip Lončarić																
3	DF	(Bosnia and Herzegovina)	Josip Kvesić																
5	DF	(Bosnia and Herzegovina)	Semir Kerla	3												3			
6	DF	(Bosnia and Herzegovina)	Asim Škaljić																
17	DF	(Bosnia and Herzegovina)	Benjamin Čolić																
18	DF	(Bosnia and Herzegovina)	Emrah Hasanhodžić																
21	DF	(Serbia)	Mladen Zeljković	1												1			
85	DF	(North Macedonia)	Yani Urdinov	3						2						5			
2	MF	(Bosnia and Herzegovina)	Elvir Čolić	1												1			
7	MF	(Bosnia and Herzegovina)	Sead Bučan	1						1						2			
8	MF	(Bosnia and Herzegovina)	Nermin Zolotić																
11	MF	(Bosnia and Herzegovina)	Srđan Stanić	2												2			
19	MF	(Bosnia and Herzegovina)	Enis Sadiković	1												1			
20	MF	(Bosnia and Herzegovina)	Damir Sadiković																
23	MF	(Bosnia and Herzegovina)	Muamer Svraka	1												1			
24	MF	(Bosnia and Herzegovina)	Nermin Jamak							2						2			
25	MF	(Croatia)	Tomislav Tomić	1	1					1						2	1		
44	MF	(Bosnia and Herzegovina)	Eldar Hasanović																
4	FW	(Bosnia and Herzegovina)	Danijal Brković																
15	FW	(Bosnia and Herzegovina)	Armin Hodžić																
16	FW	(Bosnia and Herzegovina)	Vernes Selimović	1						2						3			
26	FW	(Bosnia and Herzegovina)	Dženan Zajmović																
37	FW	(Bosnia and Herzegovina)	Riad Bajić																
—	DF	(Bosnia and Herzegovina)	Faris Fejzić																
—	DF	(Bosnia and Herzegovina)	Safet Nadarević																

Last updated: 31 August 2013
Source: Competitive matches and FKŽeljezničar.com
Ordered by (red card) , (second yellow card) and (yellow card)
(yellow card) = Number of bookings; (second yellow card) = Number of sending offs after a second yellow card; (red card) = Number of sending offs by a direct red card.

== Transfers ==
=== In ===
No.	Pos.	Nat.	Name	Age	EU	Moving from	Type	Transfer window	Ends	Transfer fee	Source
15	FW	(Bosnia and Herzegovina)	Armin Hodžić	31	Non-EU	Liverpool (England)	Loan	Summer	2014	Free	
6	DF	(Bosnia and Herzegovina)	Asim Škaljić	45	Non-EU	Free agent	Sign	Summer	2015	Free	
7	MF	(Bosnia and Herzegovina)	Sead Bučan	45	Non-EU	Free agent	Sign	Summer	2014	Free	
19	MF	(Bosnia and Herzegovina)	Enis Sadiković	36	Non-EU	Radnik Hadžići	Sign	Summer	2015	Free	
21	DF	(Serbia)	Mladen Zeljković	38	Non-EU	Borac Banja Luka	Transfer	Summer	2015	Free	
27	GK	(Croatia)	Filip Lončarić	40	EU	Free agent	Sign	Summer	2014	Free	
1	GK	(Bosnia and Herzegovina)	Adnan Hadžić	38	Non-EU	Zrinjski	Transfer	Summer	2015	Free	
—	DF	(Bosnia and Herzegovina)	Faris Fejzić	34	Non-EU	Radnik Hadžići	Transfer	Summer	2014	Free	
—	DF	(Bosnia and Herzegovina)	Safet Nadarević	46	Non-EU	NK Zagreb (Croatia)	Transfer	Summer	TBD	Free	

Total expenditure: ▼

=== Out ===
No.	Pos.	Nat.	Name	Age	EU	Moving to	Type	Transfer window	Transfer fee	Source
26	MF	(Japan)	Eishun Yoshida	41	Non-EU	TSV Ottersberg (Germany)	End of contract	Summer	Free	
18	DF	(Bosnia and Herzegovina)	Josip Ćutuk	41	EU	Free agent	End of contract	Summer	Free	
7	MF	(Bosnia and Herzegovina)	Sulejman Smajić	41	Non-EU	Olimpic	End of contract	Summer	Free	
22	GK	(Bosnia and Herzegovina)	Semir Bukvić	35	Non-EU	Travnik	End of contract	Summer	Free	
26	FW	(Bosnia and Herzegovina)	Aleksandar Nikolić	35	Non-EU	Mladost Velika Obarska	End of contract	Summer	Free	
6	DF	(Bosnia and Herzegovina)	Jadranko Bogičević	43	Non-EU	Ironi Nir Ramat HaSharon (Israel)	End of contract	Summer	Free	
19	DF	(Bosnia and Herzegovina)	Velibor Vasilić	45	Non-EU	TSV Hartberg (Austria)	Contract termination	Summer	Free	
90	MF	(Bosnia and Herzegovina)	Samir Bekrić	41	Non-EU	Mes Kerman (Iran)	End of contract	Summer	Free	
14	FW	(Bosnia and Herzegovina)	Mirsad Ramić	33	Non-EU	Travnik	Loan	Summer	Free	
29	FW	(Bosnia and Herzegovina)	Šaban Pehilj	34	Non-EU	Zvijezda	Contract termination	Summer	Free	
9	FW	(Bosnia and Herzegovina)	Eldin Adilović	40	Non-EU	Samsunspor (Turkey)	Transfer	Summer	Unknown	

Total income: ▲

== Competitions ==
=== Pre-season ===
18 June 2013	Široki Brijeg (Bosnia and Herzegovina)	2–2	(Bosnia and Herzegovina) Željezničar	Međugorje, Bosnia and Herzegovina
18:30 CEST	Kordić 25'; Barišić 47'	Report	Pehilj 88', 90'	Stadium: Stadion Međugorje

1 July 2013	Brașov (Romania)	0–1	(Bosnia and Herzegovina) Željezničar	Beltinci, Slovenia
17:00 CEST		Report	Jamak 68'	Stadium: Beltinci Sports Park

3 July 2013	Kaposvár (Hungary)	1–1	(Bosnia and Herzegovina) Željezničar	Kidričevo, Slovenia
18:30 CEST	Oláh 15'	Report	D. Sadiković 11'	Stadium: Kidričevo Sports Park

5 July 2013	Slaven Belupo (Croatia)	4–1	(Bosnia and Herzegovina) Željezničar	Stojnci, Slovenia
18:00 CEST	Roskam 8', 28'; Glavica 41'; Geng 83'	Report	Tomić 79'	Stadium: Stojnci Sports Park

6 July 2013	Aluminij (Slovenia)	4–0	(Bosnia and Herzegovina) Željezničar	Kidričevo, Slovenia
18:00 CEST				Stadium: Kidričevo Sports Park

8 July 2013	Metalist Kharkiv (Ukraine)	5–1	(Bosnia and Herzegovina) Željezničar	Bleiburg, Austria
18:00 CEST	Sosa 6'; Dević 37', 41'; Radchenko 75'; Willian 89'	Report	Hodžić 51'	Stadium: Sportplatz Bleiburg

9 July 2013	Górnik Zabrze (Poland)	0–0	(Bosnia and Herzegovina) Željezničar	Kidričevo, Slovenia
18:00 CEST				Stadium: Kidričevo Sports Park

10 July 2013	Jedinstvo Bihać (Bosnia and Herzegovina)	0–1	(Bosnia and Herzegovina) Željezničar	Bihać, Bosnia and Herzegovina
18:30 CEST			E. Sadiković 31'	Stadium: Stadion pod Borićima

=== Mid-season ===
10 September 2013	Železničar Lajkovac (Serbia)	v	(Bosnia and Herzegovina) Željezničar	Lajkovac, Serbia
				Stadium: Stadion Lajkovac

=== Overall ===
Competition	Started round	Final result	First match	Last Match
2013–14 Premier League of Bosnia and Herzegovina	—N/a		27 July 2013	
2013–14 Bosnia and Herzegovina Football Cup	Round of 32			
2013–14 UEFA Champions League	QR2	QR2	16 July 2013	23 July 2013

=== League table ===
Pos	Team	Pld	W	D	L	GF	GA	GD	Pts	Qualification or relegation
2	Široki Brijeg	30	17	8	5	66	23	+43	59	Qualification to Europa League first qualifying round
3	Sarajevo	30	16	10	4	45	21	+24	58	Qualification to Europa League second qualifying round (Note: Sarajevo qualified for 2014–15 UEFA Europa League second qualifying round by winning the 2013–14 Bosnia and Herzegovina Football Cup.)
4	Željezničar	30	16	9	5	51	29	+22	57	Qualification to Europa League first qualifying round
5	Velež	30	15	9	6	42	23	+19	54	
6	Borac Banja Luka	30	13	6	11	39	32	+7	45	

Source: SportSport.ba (in Bosnian)
Rules for classification: 1st points; 2nd goal difference; 3rd goals scored
For deciding champions, qualification to UEFA Europa League and relegation: 1st points; 2nd head-to-head points; 3rd head-to-head goal difference; 4th head-to-head goals scored; 5th head-to-head away goals scored; 6th goal difference; 7th goals scored.

==== Results summary ====
Overall								Home						Away					
Pld	W	D	L	GF	GA	GD	Pts	W	D	L	GF	GA	GD	W	D	L	GF	GA	GD
7	3	2	2	8	6	+2	11	1	2	0	4	2	+2	2	0	2	4	4	0

Last updated: 14 September 2013.
Source: Sportsport.ba

==== Results by round ====
Round	1	2	3	4	5	6	7	8	9	10	11	12	13	14	15	16	17	18	19	20	21	22	23	24	25	26	27	28	29	30
Ground	A	H	A	A	H	A	H	A	H	A	H	A	H	A	H	H	A	H	H	A	H	A	H	A	H	A	H	A	H	A
Result	W	W	W	L	D	L	D																							
Position	3	1	1	1	3	6	7																							

Updated to match(es) played on 14 September 2013. Source: Competitions
A = Away; H = Home; W = Win; D = Draw; L = Loss

==== Matches ====
27 July 2013 1	Zvijezda	0–1	Željezničar	Gradačac
17:30 CEST	Crnogorac (yellow card) 82'	Report	Kerla (yellow card) 61'; Stanić (yellow card) 61'; Selimović 64'; Tomić (yellow card) 73'; Urdinov (yellow card) 90+3'	Stadium: Banja Ilidža; Attendance: 2,500; Referee: Edin Jakupović (Bihać)

4 August 2013 2	Željezničar	2–0	Travnik	Sarajevo
20:30 CEST	E. Čolić 35'; Selimović (yellow card) 42'; Urdinov (yellow card) 56'; Kerla 67'; Zeljković (yellow card) 82'	Report	Čurić (yellow card) 24'; Hećo (red card) 55'; Seferović (yellow card) 69'; Isaković (yellow card) 90'	Stadium: Grbavica Stadium; Attendance: 3,000; Referee: Dragan Petrović (Banja Luka)

10 August 2013 3	Vitez	0–1	Željezničar	Zenica
17:30 CEST	Šišić (yellow card) 23'; Smriko (yellow card) 68'; Dedić (yellow card) 75'; Livančić (yellow card) 90+3'	Report	E. Čolić (yellow card) 16'; Selimović 27'; Tomić (yellow card) 32' (yellow-red card) 57'; Hadžić (yellow card) 87'	Stadium: Kamberovića Polje; Attendance: 2,500; Referee: Ognjen Valjić (Banja Luka)

17 August 2013 4	Borac Banja Luka	2–1	Željezničar	Banja Luka
20:30 CEST	Đelmić 18', 30'; Radulović (yellow card) 25'; Žarić (red card) 52'; Runić (yellow card) 63'; Dujaković (yellow card) 74'; Stokić (yellow card) 84'; Grujić (yellow card) 84'; Avdukić (yellow card) 88'	Report	E. Sadiković (yellow card) 6'; Stanić (yellow card) 12'; Adilović 54'	Stadium: Banja Luka City Stadium; Attendance: 4,000; Referee: Vladimir Bjelica (Istočno Sarajevo)

25 August 2013 5	Željezničar	2–2	Radnik	Sarajevo
20:00 CEST	Adilović 47'; Urdinov (yellow card) 49'; Bučan 66'; Kerla (yellow card) 72'	Report	Ćosović (yellow card) 33'; Katanec (yellow card) 43', (goal) 62'; Kojić (yellow card) 53'; Vučić (yellow card) 71'; Obradović (yellow card) 77', (goal) 80'	Stadium: Grbavica Stadium; Attendance: 3,000; Referee: Elvis Mujić (Banovići)

31 August 2013 6	Zrinjski	2–1	Željezničar	Mostar
19:30 CEST	Bekić 6'; Crnov (yellow card) 24'; Brković (yellow card) 50'; Simeunović 60', (yellow card) 61' (yellow-red card) 70'; Muminović (yellow card) 64'; Stojkić (yellow card) 88'	Report	Bučan (yellow card) 22'; Svraka 32', (yellow card) 33'; Kerla (yellow card) 90'	Stadium: Stadion pod Bijelim Brijegom; Attendance: 2,500; Referee: Ognjen Valjić (Banja Luka)

14 September 2013 7	Željezničar	0–0	Slavija	Sarajevo
19:00 CEST				Stadium: Grbavica Stadium

8	Široki Brijeg	3–2	Željezničar	Široki Brijeg
				Stadium: Pecara Stadium

9	Željezničar	4–1	Leotar	Sarajevo
				Stadium: Grbavica Stadium

10	Čelik	2–2	Željezničar	Zenica
				Stadium: Bilino Polje

11	Željezničar	1–1	Olimpic	Sarajevo
				Stadium: Grbavica Stadium

12	Mladost Velika Obarska	0–4	Željezničar	Velika Obarska
				Stadium: Gradski Stadion

13	Željezničar	1–0	Velež	Sarajevo
				Stadium: Grbavica Stadium

14	Sarajevo	0–0	Željezničar	Sarajevo
				Stadium: Asim Ferhatović Hase Stadium

15	Željezničar	3–1	Rudar Prijedor	Sarajevo
				Stadium: Grbavica Stadium

16	Željezničar	1–0	Zvijezda	Sarajevo
				Stadium: Grbavica Stadium

17	Travnik	1–2	Željezničar	Travnik
				Stadium: Stadion Pirota

18	Željezničar	3–1	Vitez	Sarajevo
				Stadium: Grbavica Stadium

19	Željezničar	1–0	Borac Banja Luka	Sarajevo
				Stadium: Grbavica Stadium

20	Radnik	0–0	Željezničar	Bijeljina
				Stadium: Gradski Stadion

21	Željezničar	2–1	Zrinjski	Sarajevo
				Stadium: Grbavica Stadium

22	Slavija	v	Željezničar	Istočno Sarajevo
				Stadium: Gradski SRC Slavija Stadium

23	Željezničar	v	Široki Brijeg	Sarajevo
				Stadium: Grbavica Stadium

24	Leotar	v	Željezničar	Trebinje
				Stadium: Police Stadium

25	Željezničar	v	Čelik	Sarajevo
				Stadium: Grbavica Stadium

26	Olimpic	v	Željezničar	Sarajevo
				Stadium: Stadion Otoka

27	Željezničar	v	Mladost Velika Obarska	Sarajevo
				Stadium: Grbavica Stadium

28	Velež	v	Željezničar	Mostar
				Stadium: Vrapčići Stadium

29	Željezničar	v	Sarajevo	Sarajevo
				Stadium: Grbavica Stadium

30	Rudar Prijedor	v	Željezničar	Prijedor
				Stadium: Gradski Stadion

=== UEFA Champions League ===
==== Second qualifying round ====
16 July 2013 First leg	Viktoria Plzeň (Czech Republic)	4–3	(Bosnia and Herzegovina) Željezničar	Plzeň, Czech Republic
17:30 CEST	Čišovský 63'; Kolář 66', 76'; Horváth (yellow card) 78'; Rajtoral 81'	Report	Jamak (yellow card) 25'; Tomić 52', (yellow card) 90'; Selimović (yellow card) 61', (goal) 78'; Urdinov (yellow card) 72'; Bučan (yellow card) 83', (goal) 85'	Stadium: Stadion města Plzně; Attendance: 10,381; Referee: César Muñiz (Spain)

23 July 2013 Second leg	Željezničar (Bosnia and Herzegovina)	1–2 (4–6 agg.)	(Czech Republic) Viktoria Plzeň	Sarajevo, Bosnia and Herzegovina
21:00 CEST	Jamak (yellow card) 31', (goal) 45'; Urdinov (yellow card) 51'; Selimović (yellow card) 57'		Wágner 5'; Procházka (red card) 20'; Petržela 31'; Kolář (yellow card) 31'; Horváth (yellow card) 43'; Řezník (yellow card) 86'	Stadium: Asim Ferhatović Hase Stadium; Referee: João Capela (Portugal)
