= Pejo Kuprešak =

Croatian footballer

Personal information
- Date of birth: 24 October 1992 (age 34)
- Place of birth: Zagreb, Croatia
- Height: 1.80 m (5 ft 11 in)
- Position: Midfielder

Team information
- Current team: Borac Imbriovec

Youth career
- 2004–2006: Rovišće
- 2006–2011: Slaven Belupo

Senior career*
Years	Team	Apps	(Gls)
2011–2013	Slaven Belupo	6	(0)
2011–2012	→ Koprivnica (loan)	15	(3)
2013	→ Zelina (loan)	10	(0)
2013–2014	Bjelovar		
2014–2015	Mladost Ždralovi		
2015–2016	Bjelovar		
2016	SV Eberau	16	(5)
2017–2019	Bjelovar		
2020	Mladost Ždralovi		
2020-2022	Bilogora '91		
2022–	Borac Imbriovec		
- * Club domestic league appearances and goals as of 13 November 2016

Pejo Kuprešak (born 24 October 1992) is a Croatian football midfielder, currently playing for lower league side Borac Imbriovec.

== Club career ==
Kuprešak played for Croatian top tier-side Slaven Belupo and had a spell at Austrian fourth level-outfit SV Eberau in 2016.
