= Igor Bubnjić =

Croatian footballer

Personal information
- Full name: Igor Bubnjić
- Date of birth: 17 July 1992 (age 34)
- Place of birth: Split, Croatia
- Height: 1.88 m (6 ft 2 in)
- Position: Centre-back

Youth career
- 1998–2004: HNK Daruvar
- 2004–2005: Kamen Sirač
- 2005–2007: HNK Daruvar
- 2007–2011: Slaven Belupo

Senior career*
Years	Team	Apps	(Gls)
2011–2013	Slaven Belupo	34	(2)
2011–2012	→ Koprivnica (loan)	13	(2)
2013–2018	Udinese	13	(0)
2015–2016	→ Carpi (loan)	9	(0)
2016–2017	→ Brescia (loan)	8	(0)
2018	→ Inter Zaprešić (loan)	0	(0)
2018–2019	Hibernians	2	(0)

International career
2011–2013	Croatia U20	7	(0)
2012–2014	Croatia U21	8	(0)
2013–2014	Croatia	2	(0)
- * Club domestic league appearances and goals

Igor Bubnjić (born 17 July 1992) is a retired Croatian footballer who played as a centre-back.

== Club career ==
Bubnjić started his career playing at youth level for Daruvar, before moving to the Slaven Belupo youth team in 2007. In the first part of the 2011–12 season, he was loaned to Treća HNL side Koprivnica where he was featured in 13 games scoring two times. He returned to Slaven Belupo after the winter break and made his debut for the first team as a late substitute in the 2–0 win against Osijek on 16 March 2012. He scored his first goal in Prva HNL in a 1–1 draw with Rijeka on 6 May 2012. In September 2012, it was announced that Bubnjić signed a five-year contract with Udinese, but would remain at Slaven until the end of the season.

On 1 October 2018, he moved to Malta, signing with Hibernians. He left the club in the summer 2019 after having played two games for the club and on 7 October 2019, Bubnjić announced his retirement at the age of 27, after being seriously injured for the past three years.

== International career ==
He made his debut for Croatia in a June 2013 friendly match against Portugal, coming on as a late substitute for Vedran Ćorluka and earned a total of 2 caps, scoring no goals. His second and final international was a September 2013 friendly away against South Korea.

== Career statistics ==
=== Club ===
As of 7 January 2018

Appearances and goals by club, season and competition
Club	Season	League			Cup		Europe		Total	
Club	Season	Division	Apps	Goals	Apps	Goals	Apps	Goals	Apps	Goals
Koprivnica (loan)	2011–12	?	13	2	–		–		13	2
Slaven Belupo	2011–12	1. HNL	9	1	–		–		9	1
Slaven Belupo	2012–13	1. HNL	25	1	5	1	4	1	34	3
Slaven Belupo	Total		34	2	5	1	4	1	43	4
Udinese	2013–14	Serie A	7	0	1	0	0	0	8	0
Udinese	2014–15	Serie A	6	0	2	0	–		5	0
Udinese	Total		13	0	3	0	0	0	16	0
Carpi (loan)	2015–16	Serie A	9	1	1	0	–		10	1
Brescia (loan)	2016–17	Serie B	8	0	0	0	–		8	0
Career total			77	5	9	2	4	1	90	8
