= Silvijo Čabraja =

Croatian footballer and manager

Personal information
- Date of birth: 4 June 1968 (age 58)
- Place of birth: Zagreb, SR Croatia, SFR Yugoslavia

Team information
- Current team: Slaven Belupo (head coach)

Managerial career
- Years: Team
- 2008–2009: Hrvatski Dragovoljac (youth)
- 2009–2010: Lokomotiva (youth)
- 2010–2011: Zelina
- 2011–2012: Ponikve
- 2012–2013: Stupnik
- 2014–2015: Lučko
- 2015–2016: Lokomotiva (youth)
- 2016–2017: Lučko
- 2020–2021: Lokomotiva (youth)
- 2021–2025: Lokomotiva
- 2025–2026: Vukovar 1991
- 2026–: Slaven Belupo

Silvijo Čabraja (born 4 June 1968) is a Croatian professional football manager, who is currently the head coach of Croatian First Football League club Slaven Belupo.

== Playing career ==
Čabraja passed through Lokomotiva youth system and represented Croatia on youth level alongside Zvonimir Boban, Robert Prosinečki and Davor Šuker. Later he won a transfer to then First division side NK Zagreb. However, Čabraja needed to pause his professional footballing career temporarily due to being diagnosed with Diabetes at the age of 20. He continued his career after two years of hiatus, this time at lower league sides before ending his playing career at NK Lučko at the age of 30.

== Managerial career ==
He started his coaching career at Hrvatski Dragovoljac youth system. After Ilija Lončarević was appointed president at Lokomotiva he hired him as a head coach, making him youngest head coach in senior football. Later he managed NK Zelina, NK Ponikve, NK Stupnik on a part-time contract. In 2008 he was appointed head of youth development at NK Lučko where he later took charge of senior team. After two spells with Druga HNL side NK Lučko from 2014 to 2016, he returned to Lokomotiva first as a head of youth development and in 2020 as a youth coach. On 8 June 2021 he was appointed head coach at Lokomotiva. He left in 2025.

== Personal life ==
While his time at Zelina, Ponikve and Stupnik he parallelly worked as a lingerie salesman. Čabraja hails from Novi Zagreb district, Siget neighbourhood.

== Managerial statistics ==
As of 28 March 2025

Managerial record by team and tenure

Team	From	To	Record				
Team	From	To	G	W	D	L	Win %
NK Lučko	15 January 2015	24 June 2015	14	5	7	2	35.71
NK Lučko	12 January 2016	19 April 2016	9	3	1	5	33.33
NK Lokomotiva Zagreb	8 June 2021	Present	145	49	43	53	33.79
Slaven Belupo	1 September 2026	present	3	1	1	1	33.33
Total			168	57	51	60	33.93
