= Marin Šestak =

Croatian footballer

Personal information
- Date of birth: 30 June 1991 (age 35)
- Place of birth: Koprivnica, Croatia
- Height: 1.89 m (6 ft 2 1/2 in)
- Position: Centre back

Youth career
- 2000–2010: Slaven Belupo

Senior career*
Years	Team	Apps	(Gls)
2010–2013	Slaven Belupo	3	(0)
2011–2012	→ Koprivnica (loan)	28	(3)
2012–2013	→ Koprivnica (loan)		
2013–2014	Podravac		
2014	Koprivnica		
2015–2016	SV Deutsch Kaltenbrunn	43	(6)
2016–2017	ASK Schlaining	26	(1)
- * Club domestic league appearances and goals as of 16 December 2022

Marin Šestak (born 30 June 1991) is a Croatian retired footballer defender, who spent a few seasons in the Austrian lower leagues.
