= Ivan Čunčić =

Croatian footballer

Personal information
- Date of birth: 9 March 1985 (age 41)
- Place of birth: Zagreb, SR Croatia
- Height: 1.86 m (6 ft 1 in)
- Position: Midfielder

Senior career*
| Years | Team | Apps | (Gls) |
| 2004–2007 | NK Zagreb | 47 | (0) |
| 2007–2008 | Vrapče | 31 | (4) |
| 2008–2009 | Segesta | 26 | (3) |
| 2009–2010 | Lučko | 18 | (1) |
| 2010–2012 | Stupnik | | |
| 2012–? | Zagorec Krapina | | |
- * Club domestic league appearances and goals

Ivan Čunčić (born 9 March 1985) is a Croatian former professional footballer who played as a midfielder.
