= Dino Kluk =

Croatian footballer

Personal information
- Date of birth: 13 May 1991 (age 35)
- Place of birth: Zagreb, SFR Yugoslavia
- Position: Defender

Team information
- Current team: Trešnjevka

Youth career
- Hrvatski Dragovoljac

Senior career*
Years	Team	Apps	(Gls)
2009–2010	Seekirchen		
2010–2012	Stupnik		
2012–2014	Hrvatski Dragovoljac	64	(1)
2014–2015	Dukla Prague	5	(0)
2015–2016	Hrvatski Dragovoljac	16	(1)
2016–2017	Liepāja	13	(0)
2017	Lokomotiva	3	(0)
2017–2018	Sesvete	27	(3)
2018–2019	Dubrava Tim Kabel		
2019–2020	Zagorec Krapina		
2020-	Trešnjevka		
- * Club domestic league appearances and goals as of 16:55, 18 January 2020 (UTC)

Dino Kluk (born 13 May 1991) is a professional Croatian football player, who plays for Trešnjevka.

== Club career ==
He previously played for FK Dukla Prague in the Czech First League. He left Dukla in August 2015.

On 16 August 2019, Kluk joined NK Zagorec Krapina.
