= Tomislav Pelin =

Croatian footballer

Personal information
- Date of birth: 26 March 1981 (age 45)
- Place of birth: Zagreb, SR Croatia, SFR Yugoslavia
- Height: 1.93 m (6 ft 4 in)
- Position: Goalkeeper

Senior career*
Years	Team	Apps	(Gls)
2000–2004	NK Zagreb	7	(0)
2004–2006	Slaven Belupo	0	(0)
2006–2008	Zimbru Chişinău	4	(0)
2008–2009	Slaven Belupo	17	(0)
2010–2011	Rijeka	0	(0)
2011–2014	Slaven Belupo	23	(0)
2014–2015	Krka	16	(0)
2015–2016	Vinogradar	0	(0)

International career^{‡}
1999	Croatia U17	2	(0)
2001	Croatia U20	3	(0)
2002	Croatia U21	1	(0)
- * Club domestic league appearances and goals as of 12 November 2022 ‡ National team caps and goals as of 11 August 2012

Tomislav Pelin (born 26 March 1981, in Zagreb) is a Croatian retired football player, who last played as a goalkeeper for the Slovenian PrvaLiga side Krka.
