= Borislav Pilipović =

Bosnia and Herzegovina footballer

Personal information
- Date of birth: 25 March 1984 (age 42)
- Place of birth: Bihać, SFR Yugoslavia
- Height: 1.80 m (5 ft 11 in)
- Position: Defender

Youth career
- 1994–1999: Ljubić Prnjavor
- 1999–2004: Župa Milka

Senior career*
Years	Team	Apps	(Gls)
2004–2006	Borac Banja Luka		
2006–2007	Žminj		
2007–2009	Istra 1961	37	(0)
2009–2011	Karlovac	52	(1)
2011–2013	Slaven Belupo	31	(0)
2013–2014	Istra 1961	23	(0)
2014–2015	Borac Banja Luka	24	(0)
2015	Vitez	17	(2)
- * Club domestic league appearances and goals

Borislav Pilipović (Serbian Cyrillic: Борислав Пилиповић; born 25 March 1984) is a Bosnian-Herzegovinian former professional footballer who played as a Defender.
