= Filip Lončarić =

Croatian footballer (born 1986)

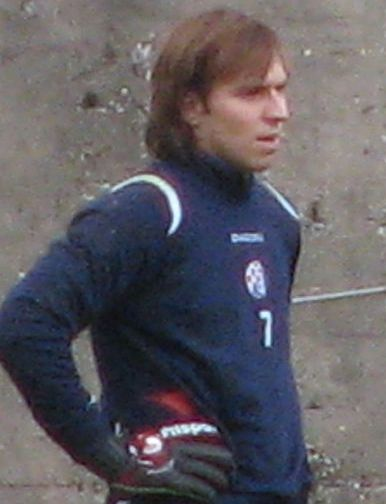
- Lončarić with Dinamo Zagreb in 2008

Personal information
- Full name: Filip Lončarić
- Date of birth: 17 September 1986 (age 40)
- Place of birth: Zagreb, SFR Yugoslavia
- Height: 1.91 m (6 ft 3 in)
- Position: Goalkeeper

Youth career
- 1994–2005: Dinamo Zagreb

Senior career*
Years	Team	Apps	(Gls)
2005–2012	Dinamo Zagreb	41	(0)
2006	→ Lokomotiva (loan)	0	(0)
2012	Gaz Metan Mediaş	3	(0)
2013–2014	Željezničar	23	(0)
2014–2015	Osijek	6	(0)
2015–2016	Zrinjski Mostar	3	(0)
2016–2018	Tromsø	16	(0)
Total		92	(0)

International career
2002	Croatia U16	8	(0)
2002-2003	Croatia U17	17	(0)
2003	Croatia U18	2	(0)
2003-2005	Croatia U19	13	(0)
2006-2007	Croatia U20	4	(0)
2007	Croatia U21	3	(0)
- * Club domestic league appearances and goals

Filip Lončarić (born 17 September 1986) is a Croatian retired professional footballer who played as a goalkeeper.

Lončarić joined GNK Dinamo Zagreb in 1994, aged just eight and made his breakthrough to the first-team squad for the 2005–06 season. He had a brief loan-spell at Dinamo Zagreb's feeder team NK Lokomotiva, but made no competitive appearances. With Dinamo, Lončarić won seven Prva HNL titles, five Croatian Cup titles and two Croatian Super Cups. After Dinamo, he played at CS Gaz Metan Mediaș, FK Željezničar Sarajevo, NK Osijek, HŠK Zrinjski Mostar and Tromsø IL, before retiring from football in August 2018 at the age of 31.

In the national team, Lončarić played for various youth selections from 2002 to 2007. He was capped a total of 47 times, most of which he made playing for the under-17 and under-19 teams.

== Club career ==
=== Dinamo Zagreb ===
Lončarić has been part of Dinamo Zagreb's first team since the beginning of the 2005–06 season, but went on to spend the second part of the season on loan to Lokomotiva, who played in the Treća HNL at the time. Returning to Dinamo Zagreb for the beginning of the 2006–07 season, he made his competitive debut for the club on 1 October 2006 in their 2–2 draw away at Hajduk Split, following a couple of blunders by the first-choice goalkeeper Ivan Turina early in the season. He subsequently became the club's first-choice goalkeeper and appeared in a total of 26 domestic league matches during the season.

However, following the club's signing of German goalkeeper Georg Koch in the summer of 2007, Lončarić once again found himself relegated to the bench and only appeared in two domestic league matches early in the season before sustaining an injury in a cup match in October 2007, which led to him being sidelined for most of the season and eventually losing his place as the club's second-choice goalkeeper to Ivan Kelava.

Following the departure of Koch in the summer of 2008, the club decided to re-sign former Croatian international goalkeeper Tomislav Butina to serve as the new first-choice goalkeeper, with Kelava keeping his place as the second-choice goalkeeper and Lončarić staying the club's third-choice goalkeeper until Kelava was loaned to Lokomotiva Zagreb in August 2009. As the club's third-choice goalkeeper, Lončarić made no competitive appearances for Dinamo Zagreb throughout the entire 2008–09 season.

However, following a couple bad performances by Butina in European matches, Lončarić was given a second chance as the club's first-choice goalkeeper and made his first competitive appearance in nearly two years when he appeared in Dinamo Zagreb's 6–0 win at home to Rijeka on 20 September 2009 in the Prva HNL. On 1 October 2009, exactly three years after his competitive debut for Dinamo, Lončarić made his European debut for the club in their 3–0 away win at Timişoara in the UEFA Europa League. However, he was soon forced to take another lengthy break after renewing his injury in Dinamo's Europa League match against Ajax on 22 October 2009.

His first competitive match after the injury break came on 31 July 2010 in a 2–1 defeat at home to Rijeka in the Croatian top flight, deputising for the injured Butina. On 4 August 2010, he made his debut in the UEFA Champions League qualifiers, at home to Sheriff Tiraspol. After a 1–1 draw in the regular 90 minutes and the ensuing 30 minutes of extra time, the match went into a penalty shootout, where Lončarić was able to save two kicks, but Dinamo eventually lost 6–5. Dinamo Zagreb was relieved by departure of Butina, which saw Lončarić further increase his first-choice goalkeeper status. However, Lončarić was again injured in a league match at Hajduk Split on 11 September 2010, his 6th appearance in the competition during the 2010–11 season. He subsequently did not appear in a competitive match for almost a year. He made three appearances in the league during the first half of the 2011–12 season, his final season with Dinamo Zagreb.

=== Tromsø ===
In January 2016, Lončarić signed a season-long contract with Norwegian club Tromsø IL. Initially the club's second-choice goalkeeper, he made his league debut on 9 July 2016 in a 2–2 draw at home to Haugesund. He kept his place in the starting line-up for the remainder of the season, making a total of 16 appearances in the top flight. On 7 August 2018 at the age of 31 Lončarić decide to retire from football after a new knee injury.

== International career ==
Lončarić started his international career for Croatia with a debut for the under-16 team in a friendly match against the under-16 team of Slovenia on 5 March 2002. He made seven more appearances for the under-16 selection before debuting for the under-17 team in a friendly match against Czech Republic on 7 August 2002, aged just 15.

Lončarić was very successful playing for the under-17 team, collecting a total of 17 caps throughout 2002 and 2003. He featured in two friendly matches for the under-18 team and then with 17 years of age debuted for the under-19 team. Lončarić made a total of 13 appearances for the under-19 selection. He had a short spell with the under-20 team, playing in four friendly matches throughout 2006 and 2007.

In 2007, he made his last appearances for the Croatian youth teams, featuring in three matches for the under-21 team. Lončarić was capped a total of 47 times for the Croatian youth teams.

== Career statistics ==
=== Club ===
- Note: the Croatian Cup appearances for Dinamo Zagreb can be viewed at the official website of the club nk-dinamo.hr under the section The Match.

Appearances and goals by club, season and competition
Club	Season	League	League		Cup		Continental		Total	
Club	Season	League	Apps	Goals	Apps	Goals	Apps	Goals	Apps	Goals
Dinamo Zagreb	2005–06	1. HNL	0	0	0	0	0	0	0	0
Dinamo Zagreb	2006–07	1. HNL	26	0	7	0	0	0	33	0
Dinamo Zagreb	2007–08	1. HNL	2	0	1	0	0	0	3	0
Dinamo Zagreb	2008–09	1. HNL	0	0	0	0	0	0	0	0
Dinamo Zagreb	2009–10	1. HNL	4	0	1	0	2	0	7	0
Dinamo Zagreb	2010–11	1. HNL	6	0	0	0	3	0	10^{1}	0
Dinamo Zagreb	2011–12	1. HNL	3	0	0	0	0	0	3	0
Dinamo Zagreb	Total		41	0	9	0	5	0	55	0
Gaz Metan Mediaș	2012–13	Liga I	3	0	0	0	–		3	0
Željezničar	2013–14	Bosnian Premier League	23	0	2	0	0	0	25	0
Osijek	2014–15	1. HNL	6	0	1	0	–		7	0
Zrinjski Mostar	2015–16	Bosnian Premier League	3	0	0	0	0	0	3	0
Tromsø	2016	Eliteserien	16	0	4	0	–		20	0
Tromsø	2017	Eliteserien	0	0	0	0	–		0	0
Tromsø	2018	Eliteserien	0	0	0	0	–		0	0
Tromsø	Total		16	0	4	0	0	0	20	0
Career total			92	0	16	0	5	0	113	0

^{1} Including the 2010 Croatian Supercup match against Hajduk Split.

== Honours ==
=== Club ===
Dinamo Zagreb

- Prva HNL: 2005–06, 2006–07, 2007–08, 2008–09, 2009–10, 2010–11, 2011–12
- Croatian Cup: 2006–07, 2007–08, 2008–09, 2010–11, 2011–12
- Croatian Super Cup: 2006, 2010
