= Vedran Purić =

Croatian footballer and manager

Personal information
- Date of birth: 16 March 1986 (age 40)
- Place of birth: Koprivnica, SFR Yugoslavia
- Height: 1.71 m (5 ft 7 in)
- Position: Right back

Youth career
- Tomislav Drnje
- Slaven Belupo

Senior career*
| Years | Team | Apps | (Gls) |
| 2004–2018 | Slaven Belupo | 262 | (2) |
| 2004–2008 | → Koprivnica (loan) | 82 | (4) |

Managerial career
- 2018: Slaven Belupo (caretaker)
- * Club domestic league appearances and goals as of 18 May 2018

Vedran Purić (born 16 March 1986 in Koprivnica) is a Croatian football manager and retired footballer who last played as a right back. He spent almost his entire career at hometown club Slaven Belupo.

He last served as a caretaker manager for Slaven Belupo in 2018.

== Career statistics ==
| Club | Season | League | | Cup | | Europe | | Total | |
| Club | Season | Apps | Goals | Apps | Goals | Apps | Goals | Apps | Goals |
|---|---|---|---|---|---|---|---|---|---|
| Slaven Belupo | 2007–08 | 9 | 0 | 1 | 0 | – | | 10 | 0 |
| Slaven Belupo | 2008–09 | 25 | 0 | 1 | 0 | 4 | 0 | 30 | 0 |
| Slaven Belupo | 2009–10 | 19 | 0 | 2 | 0 | 3 | 0 | 24 | 0 |
| Slaven Belupo | 2010–11 | 24 | 0 | 5 | 0 | – | | 29 | 0 |
| Slaven Belupo | 2011–12 | 23 | 0 | 1 | 0 | – | | 24 | 0 |
| Slaven Belupo | 2012–13 | 24 | 1 | 4 | 0 | 3 | 0 | 31 | 1 |
| Slaven Belupo | 2013–14 | 31 | 1 | 3 | 0 | – | | 34 | 1 |
| Slaven Belupo | 2014–15 | 29 | 0 | 1 | 0 | – | | 30 | 0 |
| Slaven Belupo | 2015–16 | 29 | 0 | 5 | 0 | – | | 34 | 0 |
| Slaven Belupo | 2016–17 | 31 | 0 | 3 | 0 | – | | 34 | 0 |
| Slaven Belupo | 2017–18 | 18 | 0 | 1 | 0 | – | | 19 | 0 |
| | Total | 262 | 2 | 27 | 0 | 10 | 0 | 299 | 2 |
