= Silvio Rodić =

Croatian footballer

Personal information
- Date of birth: 25 July 1987 (age 39)
- Place of birth: Osijek, SFR Yugoslavia
- Height: 1.98 m (6 ft 6 in)
- Position: Goalkeeper

Team information
- Current team: Birkenhead United
- Number: 1

Youth career
- 1994–2002: Jedinstvo Donji Miholjac
- 2002–2005: Slaven Belupo

Senior career*
Years	Team	Apps	(Gls)
2005–2014	Slaven Belupo	151	(0)
2005–2007	→ Koprivnica (loan)	38	(0)
2014	→ Zagłębie Lubin (loan)	12	(0)
2014–2016	Górnik Łęczna	18	(0)
2016–2017	Eastern Suburbs	17	(0)
2018	Waiheke United	19	(0)
2018–2019	Waitakere United	1	(0)
2019–2022	North Shore United	32	(0)
2022–	Birkenhead United	44	(0)

International career
2008	Croatia U21	1	(0)
- * Club domestic league appearances and goals as of 25 July 2024

Silvio Rodić (born 25 July 1987) is a Croatian professional professional footballer who last played as a goalkeeper for Birkenhead United. Besides Croatia, he has played in Poland and New Zealand.

== Career ==
A native of Donji Miholjac, Rodić joined NK Slaven Belupo in Koprivnica in 2002, aged 15. In his last under-19 season, he was loaned to Slaven's feeder club, NK Koprivnica in Croatia's second-tier. He would go onto establishing himself as the club's first choice goalkeeper there during his first two seasons of first-team football.

Upon his return to Slaven, he was initially the understudy to Vanja Iveša, however, by 2008/09, he would win the starting role, eventually making 151 league appearances for the club in Croatia's top-flight, the Prva HNL.

In early 2014, Rodić was loaned to Polish top-flight club, Zagłębie Lubin. His performances drew the attention of other league sides, and he was signed that summer by fellow Ekstraklasa club, Górnik Łęczna.

In 2016, Rodić and his family immigrated to New Zealand. He signed for Eastern Suburbs in New Zealand's top tier, dropping to the NRFL Division 1 to play for Waiheke United during the winter football season. He signed for Waitakere United the following season, making only one appearance as backup to Nick Draper.

Later, having signed with North Shore United, Rodić won the NRFL Premier in 2019.

Rodić signed for Birkenhead United before the start of the 2022 New Zealand National League.

== International career ==
Rodić has represented Croatia at U21 level, playing the full 90 minutes in a friendly against Togo in 2008.
