= Tomislav Tomić =

Bosnian professional footballer

Personal information
- Date of birth: 16 November 1990 (age 35)
- Place of birth: Mostar, SR Bosnia and Herzegovina, Yugoslavia
- Height: 1.83 m (6 ft 0 in)
- Position: Midfielder

Team information
- Current team: Široki Brijeg
- Number: 90

Youth career
- Široki Brijeg

Senior career*
Years	Team	Apps	(Gls)
2008–2012	Široki Brijeg	1	(0)
2011–2012	→ GOŠK Gabela (loan)	28	(2)
2012–2015	Željezničar	53	(7)
2015–2016	Xanthi	0	(0)
2016–2017	Zrinjski Mostar	41	(5)
2017–2020	Olimpija Ljubljana	97	(2)
2020–2021	Admira Wacker	14	(1)
2021–2022	Olimpija Ljubljana	17	(0)
2022	→ Celje (loan)	11	(0)
2022–2023	Celje	2	(0)
2023–	Široki Brijeg	98	(2)

International career
2018	Bosnia and Herzegovina	2	(0)
- * Club domestic league appearances and goals as of 31 October 2026

Tomislav Tomić (Bosnian pronunciation: [tǒmislaʋ tǒmitɕ]; born 16 November 1990) is a Bosnian professional footballer who plays as a midfielder for Bosnian Premier League club Široki Brijeg.

Tomić made his senior debut for Široki Brijeg in 2008, and later played for Željezničar and Zrinjski Mostar in his homeland, winning a total of three league titles. With Slovenian club Olimpija Ljubljana, he won a double of Slovenian PrvaLiga and Slovenian Cup in 2017–18.

He made his senior international debut for Bosnia and Herzegovina in 2018, and made a total of two appearances.

== Club career ==
=== Early career ===
Tomić came through Široki Brijeg's youth academy. He made his senior debut against Posušje on 23 November 2008 at the age of 18.

In the summer of 2011, Tomić was sent on a season-long loan to GOŠK Gabela, where he scored his first career goal on 7 April 2012 against his parent team Široki Brijeg.

In June 2012, he signed with Željezničar, where he stayed for three seasons and also won the league title in the 2012–13 season.

After a brief spell with Greek team Xanthi in 2015, he switched to Zrinjski Mostar before the second half of the 2015–16 season. With Zrinjski, he won two consecutive league titles, in 2015–16 and 2016–17.

=== Olimpija Ljubljana ===
On 12 June 2017, Tomić joined Slovenian side Olimpija Ljubljana on free transfer. He made his competitive debut for the club in UEFA Europa League qualifier against VPS on 29 June. Two weeks later, he made his league debut in a victory over Celje. Tomić won his first trophy with the club on 27 May 2018, when they were crowned league champions.

On 16 October 2018, Tomić extended his contract until June 2020.

He scored his first goal for Olimpija Ljubljana on 27 October 2018 against Maribor. In September 2019, Tomić played his 100th game for the team.

Tomić left Olimpija after the 2019–20 season following the decision to not renew his contract.

=== Admira Wacker ===
In August 2020, Tomić signed a three-year deal with Austrian outfit Admira Wacker. However, he stayed at Admira for just one season and featured in only 14 league matches, mainly due to the ankle injury. After the season, he returned to Olimpija on a two-year contract.

== International career ==
In January 2018, Tomić received his first senior call-up to Bosnia and Herzegovina, for friendly games against the United States and Mexico. He debuted in a goalless draw against the former on 28 January.

== Career statistics ==
=== Club ===
As of match played 31 October 2026

Appearances and goals by club, season and competition
Club	Season	League			National cup (Note: Includes Bosnian Cup, Greek Cup, Slovenian Cup, Austrian Cup)		Continental		Total	
Club	Season	Division	Apps	Goals	Apps	Goals	Apps	Goals	Apps	Goals
Široki Brijeg	2008–09	Bosnian Premier League	1	0	0	0	—		1	0
GOŠK Gabela (loan)	2011–12	Bosnian Premier League	28	2	2	0	—		30	2
Željezničar	2012–13	Bosnian Premier League	15	1	5	0	0	0	20	1
Željezničar	2013–14	Bosnian Premier League	25	3	2	0	2 (Note: Appearances in UEFA Champions League)	1	29	4
Željezničar	2014–15	Bosnian Premier League	13	3	2	0	4 (Note: Appearances in UEFA Europa League)	0	19	3
Željezničar	Total		53	7	9	0	6	1	68	8
Xanthi	2015–16	Super League Greece	0	0	1	0	—		1	0
Zrinjski Mostar	2015–16	Bosnian Premier League	11	0	0	0	0	0	11	0
Zrinjski Mostar	2016–17	Bosnian Premier League	30	5	3	0	2	0	35	5
Zrinjski Mostar	Total		41	5	3	0	2	0	46	5
Olimpija Ljubljana	2017–18	Slovenian PrvaLiga	32	0	5	0	2	0	39	0
Olimpija Ljubljana	2018–19	Slovenian PrvaLiga	31	1	5	0	8 (Note: Two appearances in UEFA Champions League, six appearances in UEFA Europa League)	0	44	1
Olimpija Ljubljana	2019–20	Slovenian PrvaLiga	34	1	1	0	4	0	39	1
Olimpija Ljubljana	Total		97	2	11	0	14	0	122	2
Admira Wacker	2020–21	Austrian Bundesliga	14	1	2	0	—		16	1
Olimpija Ljubljana	2021–22	Slovenian PrvaLiga	17	0	1	0	4 (Note: Appearances in UEFA Europa Conference League)	0	22	0
Celje (loan)	2021–22	Slovenian PrvaLiga	11	0	1	0	—		12	0
Celje	2022–23	Slovenian PrvaLiga	2	0	0	0	—		2	0
Celje	Total		13	0	1	0	—		14	0
Široki Brijeg	2022–23	Bosnian Premier League	7	0	—		—		7	0
Široki Brijeg	2023–24	Bosnian Premier League	20	0	4	0	—		24	0
Široki Brijeg	2024–25	Bosnian Premier League	27	1	7	0	—		34	1
Široki Brijeg	2025–26	Bosnian Premier League	33	1	1	0	—		34	1
Široki Brijeg	2026–27	Bosnian Premier League	11	0	1	0	—		12	0
Široki Brijeg	Total		98	2	13	0	—		111	2
Career total			362	19	43	0	26	1	431	20

=== International ===
Appearances and goals by national team and year
National team	Year	Apps	Goals
Bosnia and Herzegovina
Bosnia and Herzegovina	2018	2	0
Total		2	0

== Honours ==
Željezničar

- Bosnian Premier League: 2012–13

Zrinjski Mostar

- Bosnian Premier League: 2015–16, 2016–17

Olimpija Ljubljana

- Slovenian PrvaLiga: 2017–18
- Slovenian Cup: 2017–18, 2018–19
