= Kruno Ivančić =

Croatian footballer

Personal information
- Full name: Kruno Ivančić
- Date of birth: 18 January 1994 (age 32)
- Place of birth: Zagreb, Croatia
- Height: 1.82 m (6 ft 0 in)
- Position: Winger

Youth career
- 2004–2006: Croatia Sesvete
- 2006–2007: Dinamo Zagreb
- 2007–2010: Croatia Sesvete
- 2010–2012: Dinamo Zagreb

Senior career*
Years	Team	Apps	(Gls)
2013–2016	Dinamo Zagreb	0	(0)
2013	→ Sesvete (loan)	8	(2)
2014–2015	→ Istra 1961 (loan)	12	(1)
2015	→ Olimpija Ljubljana (loan)	9	(1)
2015–2016	→ Sesvete (loan)	22	(4)
2016–2017	Dinamo Zagreb B	11	(2)
2017	Sesvete	9	(4)
2017–2018	Spartaks Jūrmala	9	(0)
2018–2019	Aluminij	12	(0)
2019–2020	Međimurje	17	(3)
2020	Hrvatski Dragovoljac	2	(0)

International career
2008	Croatia U14	2	(3)
2009	Croatia U15	2	(1)
2009	Croatia U16	4	(0)
2009–2011	Croatia U17	27	(6)
2012	Croatia U18	2	(0)
2012–2013	Croatia U19	10	(6)
2012–2013	Croatia U20	5	(0)
2014–2015	Croatia U21	4	(0)
- * Club domestic league appearances and goals as of 00:26, 28 December 2019 (UTC)

Kruno Ivančić (born 18 January 1994) is a Croatian football winger who mosr recently played for Hrvatski Dragovoljac.

== Club career ==
During the 2012–13 season, Ivančić scored eight goals out of two games with Sesvete in the Druga HNL, Croatia's second division. Then he joined Istra 1961. He made his top division debut at 20 July 2014 against Hajduk Split. The game ended with a 1–1 draw.
