= Stjepan Geng =

Croatian footballer

Personal information
- Date of birth: 2 March 1993 (age 33)
- Place of birth: Virovitica, Croatia
- Height: 1.74 m (5 ft 9 in)
- Position: Right-back

Youth career
- 2001–2004: Podravac Sopje
- 2004–2005: Tvin Virovitica
- 2005–2007: Pitomača
- 2007–2010: Slaven Belupo

Senior career*
Years	Team	Apps	(Gls)
2010–2015	Slaven Belupo	40	(1)
2014	→ Segesta (loan)	14	(1)
2015	SC Wiesfleck		
2016–2021	FC 08 Villingen	74	(6)

International career
2007	Croatia U14	2	(0)
2008	Croatia U15	3	(0)
2009	Croatia U16	2	(0)
2012	Croatia U19	1	(0)
- * Club domestic league appearances and goals

Stjepan Geng (born 2 March 1993) is a Croatian former professional footballer who played as a right-back.
