= Enes Novinić =

Croatian footballer (born 1985)

Personal information
- Date of birth: 18 July 1985 (age 41)
- Place of birth: Čakovec, SFR Yugoslavia
- Height: 1.80 m (5 ft 11 in)
- Position: Forward

Youth career
- Plavi Peklenica
- Sokol Vratišinec
- 1999–2003: Varteks

Senior career*
Years	Team	Apps	(Gls)
2003–2009	Varteks	105	(25)
2009–2011	Karlovac	59	(14)
2012	FC Lustenau 07	27	(6)
2012	FC Lustenau 07 Amateure	1	(2)
2013–2014	Slaven Belupo	22	(4)
2014	Slaven Belupo B	2	(1)
2015–2016	Krka	32	(3)
2016	Karlovac	5	(2)
2017	Segesta	13	(5)
2017–2021	Karlovac	45	(34)
2022	Duga Resa 1929	9	(7)
2022–2023	Vatrogasac Gornje Mekušje	10	(11)

International career
2003	Croatia U18	2	(3)
2003–2004	Croatia U19	10	(4)
2004	Croatia U20	2	(0)
- * Club domestic league appearances and goals as of 31 October 2025

Enes Novinić (born 18 July 1985, in Čakovec) is a retired Croatian footballer who played as a forward.

== Club career ==
A product of Prva HNL side Varteks' youth academy, Novinić was promoted to their first team squad in July 2003. He soon established himself as a regular member of the club's starting lineup and appeared in a total of 104 league matches. He scored 25 goals for Varteks before leaving the club in the 2009 summer transfer window and joining the newly promoted Karlovac on a free transfer.

During his time at Varteks, Novinić helped the club reach the Croatian Cup Finals twice, in the 2003–04 and 2005–06 seasons, and was the club's top league scorer in the 2006–07 season.

In 2017, Novinić returned for his third stint in NK Karlovac. In 2020, having experienced a blood vessel rupture in his brain, Novinić put his football career on pause. He would return, fully recovered, in early 2022 to play half a season at Duga Resa 1929, followed by a season at county-level Vatrogasac Gornje Mekušje before retiring.

== International career ==
Novinić was also capped for Croatia at youth levels, scoring a total of 7 goals in 14 international matches between 2003 and 2004.
