= Mario Gregurina =

Croatian footballer

Personal information
- Date of birth: 23 March 1988 (age 38)
- Place of birth: Koprivnica, SFR Yugoslavia
- Height: 1.80 m (5 ft 11 in)
- Position: Midfielder

Team information
- Current team: No team

Youth career
- 1998–2007: Slaven Belupo

Senior career*
Years	Team	Apps	(Gls)
2007–2017	Slaven Belupo	169	(5)
2007	→ Koprivnica (loan)		
2018	SV Rohrbach	12	(2)
2018–2019	Koprivnica	15	(1)
2019–2023	Graničar Kotoriba		

International career
2004	Croatia U16	2	(0)
2004	Croatia U17	10	(0)
2005	Croatia U18	1	(0)
2008	Croatia U20	1	(0)

Managerial career
- 2025–2026: Slaven Belupo
- * Club domestic league appearances and goals as of 8 December 2018

Mario Gregurina (born 23 March 1988) is a Croatian football manager and former player who played as a midfielder.

== Club career ==
Gregurina had a spell abroad, with Austrian side SV Rohrbach in 2018.
