= Martin Šaban =

Croatian footballer

Personal information
- Date of birth: 26 December 1987 (age 38)
- Place of birth: Zagreb, SR Croatia, SFR Yugoslavia
- Height: 1.87 m (6 ft 1 1/2 in)
- Position: Forward

Team information
- Current team: Gaj Mače

Youth career
- 1994–2001: Stubica
- 2001–2006: Varteks

Senior career*
Years	Team	Apps	(Gls)
2006–2008	Varteks	1	(0)
2006–2007	→ Bjelovar (loan)	16	(2)
2007–2008	→ Sloboda Varaždin (loan)		
2008–2009	Croatia Sesvete	16	(2)
2009–2012	Pomorac	62	(27)
2012–2013	Slaven Belupo	31	(2)
2013–2014	Pomorac	15	(1)
2014	Rudeš	13	(5)
2014–2015	Krka	13	(1)
2015–2016	Rudeš	17	(4)
2016–2017	Vrapče	27	(14)
2017–2020	SV Ilz	61	(47)
2020-	Gaj Mače		
- * Club domestic league appearances and goals as of 31 January 2018

Martin Šaban (born 26 December 1987) is a Croatian football forward currently playing for Gaj Mače.

== Career ==
He had a spell at Austrian lower league side Ilzer SV.

== Honours ==
=== Individual ===
- Croatian Cup Top goalscorer: 2020–21
