= Alen Maras =

Croatian footballer (born 1982)

Personal information
- Date of birth: 27 February 1982 (age 44)
- Place of birth: Bjelovar, SFR Yugoslavia
- Height: 1.82 m (5 ft 11 1/2 in)
- Positions: Defender; midfielder

Team information
- Current team: Radnik Križevci

Youth career
- 1990–1996: Mladost Ždralovi
- 1997–2001: Varteks

Senior career*
Years	Team	Apps	(Gls)
2001–2002	Varteks	4	(0)
2002–2003	Osijek	2	(0)
2003	Pomorac		
2003–2004	NK Zagreb	20	(0)
2004–2005	Bjelovar	27	(4)
2005–2008	Hrvatski Dragovoljac	80	(13)
2008–2013	Slaven Belupo	96	(10)
2013	Inter Zaprešić	16	(1)
2014	Lučko	15	(0)
2015	Hrvatski Dragovoljac	8	(0)
2015–2017	Mladost Ždralovi		
2017–	Radnik Križevci		

International career^{‡}
1997–1998	Croatia U15	6	(0)
1999	Croatia U16	1	(0)
1998–1999	Croatia U17	13	(3)
2000	Croatia U18	2	(0)
1999–2001	Croatia U19	9	(1)
2000–2003	Croatia U20	14	(1)
2002	Croatia U21	2	(0)
- * Club domestic league appearances and goals as of 21 July 2011 ‡ National team caps and goals as of 16 October 2007

Alen Maras (born 27 February 1982 in Bjelovar) is a Croatian football player, currently playing as defender for Radnik Križevci.

== Club career ==
In 2013, Maras joined second tier-side NK Inter Zaprešić.
