= Nikola Rak =

Croatian footballer

Personal information
- Date of birth: 29 August 1987 (age 39)
- Place of birth: Zagreb, SR Croatia, SFR Yugoslavia
- Height: 1.73 m (5 ft 8 in)
- Position: Midfielder

Team information
- Current team: Lučko
- Number: 7

Youth career
- 1995–1998: Buna
- 1998–2004: Radnik Velika Gorica

Senior career*
Years	Team	Apps	(Gls)
2004–2007	Radnik Velika Gorica	47	(8)
2008–2012	Lučko	109	(30)
2012–2014	Slaven Belupo	51	(7)
2014–2015	Gorica	26	(7)
2015–2016	Lučko	19	(5)
2016–2017	Warriors FC	22	(5)
2017	Lučko	13	(4)
2017–2019	Inter Zaprešić	64	(5)
2019–2021	Šibenik	44	(3)
2021–2022	Inter Zaprešić	25	(6)
2022–	Lučko		
- * Club domestic league appearances and goals as of 3 December 2022

Nikola Rak (born 29 August 1987) is a Croatian professional footballer who plays as a midfielder for Croatian First Football League club NK Lučko.

== Club career ==
In June 2012 Rak signed a two-year contract with Slaven Belupo. In his debut for the club in the second qualifying round of the UEFA Europa League on 19 July 2012, he scored a hat-trick in a 6–0 victory over Portadown. Three days later, he hit a brace in a 3–0 away win against Cibalia in the first round of Prva HNL.

In 2016 Rak signed for S.League champions Warriors FC.

== Career statistics ==
=== Club ===
As of 14 July 2019.

Club	Season	League			Croatian Football Cup		League Cup		Continental Cup		Total	
Club	Season	Division	Apps	Goals	Apps	Goals	Apps	Goals	Apps	Goals	Apps	Goals
NK Lučko	2008–09	Croatian Third Football League	0	0	0	0	0	0	0	0	0	0
NK Lučko	2009–10	Croatian Second Football League	0	0	0	0	0	0	0	0	0	0
NK Lučko	2010–11	Croatian Second Football League	0	0	0	0	0	0	0	0	0	0
NK Lučko	2011–12	Croatian First Football League	29	6	0	0	0	0	0	0	29	6
NK Lučko	Total		109	30	0	0	0	0	0	0	109	30
NK Slaven Belupo	2012–13	Croatian First Football League	21	4	2	0	0	0	0	0	23	4
NK Slaven Belupo	2013–14	Croatian First Football League	30	1	3	1	0	0	0	0	33	2
NK Slaven Belupo	Total		51	5	5	1	0	0	0	0	56	6
HNK Gorica	2014–15	Croatian Second Football League	26	7	0	0	0	0	0	0	26	7
HNK Gorica	Total		26	7	0	0	0	0	0	0	26	7
NK Lučko	2015–16	Croatian Second Football League	19	5	0	0	0	0	0	0	19	5
NK Lučko	Total		19	5	0	0	0	0	0	0	19	5
Club	Season	League			Singapore Cup		League Cup		AFC Cup		Total	
Club	Season	Division	Apps	Goals	Apps	Goals	Apps	Goals	Apps	Goals	Apps	Goals
Warriors FC	2016	S.League	22	5	0	0	2	0	0	0	24	5
Warriors FC	Total		22	5	0	0	2	0	0	0	24	5
Club	Season	League			Croatian Football Cup		League Cup		Continental Cup		Total	
Club	Season	Division	Apps	Goals	Apps	Goals	Apps	Goals	Apps	Goals	Apps	Goals
NK Lučko	2016–17	Croatian Second Football League	13	4	0	0	0	0	0	0	13	4
NK Lučko	Total		13	4	0	0	0	0	0	0	13	4
NK Inter Zaprešić	2017–18	Croatian First Football League	34	4	2	0	0	0	0	0	36	4
NK Inter Zaprešić	2018–19	Croatian First Football League	30	1	3	0	0	0	0	0	33	1
NK Inter Zaprešić	Total		64	5	5	0	0	0	0	0	69	5
Career total			13	6	0	0	0	0	6	2	19	8

== Honours ==
Šibenik

- Croatian Second League: 2019–20
