= Mateas Delić =

Croatian footballer

Personal information
- Date of birth: 17 June 1988 (age 38)
- Place of birth: Sanski Most, Yugoslavia
- Height: 1.78 m (5 ft 10 in)
- Position: Forward

Team information
- Current team: Koprivnica

Youth career
- 2000–2005: Slaven Belupo

Senior career*
Years	Team	Apps	(Gls)
2006–2010	Slaven Belupo	92	(13)
2006	→ Koprivnica (loan)	10	(3)
2011–2012	Gangwon	10	(0)
2012–2016	Slaven Belupo	123	(17)
2017	Beroe	11	(1)
2017	Bisceglie Calcio	6	(1)
2018–2020	Slaven Belupo	58	(4)
2020-2021	NK Tehnicar 1974		
2021-	Koprivnica		

International career
2004	Croatia U16	2	(0)
2004–2005	Croatia U17	15	(1)
2006–2007	Croatia U19	8	(0)
2008	Croatia U21	1	(0)
- * Club domestic league appearances and goals as of 27 May 2019

Mateas Delić (born 17 June 1988) is a Croatian professional footballer who plays as a forward for Koprivnica.

== Club career ==
On 16 January 2017, Delić signed with Bulgarian First League side Beroe Stara Zagora but his contract was terminated by mutual consent in May.

== Club career statistics ==
As of 20 May 2012

Club performance			League		Cup		League Cup		Continental		Total	
Season	Club	League	Apps	Goals	Apps	Goals	Apps	Goals	Apps	Goals	Apps	Goals
Croatia			League		Croatian Cup		League Cup		Europe		Total	
2005–06	Koprivnica	Druga HNL	10	3			–		–			
2006–07	Slaven Belupo	Prva HNL	3	0			–		–			
2007–08	Slaven Belupo	Prva HNL	26	2			–		2	0		
2008–09	Slaven Belupo	Prva HNL	21	1	0	0	–		0	0	21	1
2009–10	Slaven Belupo	Prva HNL	26	6	2	0	–		5	0	33	6
2010–11	Slaven Belupo	Prva HNL	16	4	3	0	–		–		19	4
Korea Republic			League		FA Cup		K-League Cup		Asia		Total	
2011	Gangwon FC	K-League	10	0	0	0	3	0	–		13	0
2012	Gangwon FC	K-League	0	0	0	0	–		–		0	0
Country	Croatia		102	16			–		7	0		
Country	Korea Republic		10	0	0	0	3	0	–		13	0
Total			112	16			3	0	7	0		
