= NK Stupnik =

Croatian football club

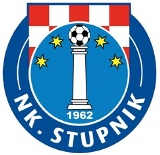
- Full name: Nogometni klub Stupnik
- Founded: 1972
- Ground: ŠRC Stupnik
- Capacity: 1,000
- Manager: Boris Perković
- League: 1. ŽNL
- 2015–16: Treća HNL West, 15th (relegated)
Home colours	Away colours

NK Stupnik is a Croatian football club based in the municipality of Stupnik, near the city of Zagreb.
