= NK Koprivnica =

Croatian football club

- Full name: NK Koprivnica
- Founded: 1950; 76 years ago
- Ground: Gradski stadion Ivan Kušek-Apaš
- Capacity: 3,134
- League: 3. NL North
Home colours	Away colours

NK Koprivnica is a Croatian professional football club based in the town of Koprivnica. The team shares a stadium with top-flight team NK Slaven Belupo. From the season 2007–08 they are playing continuously in the Treća HNL.

== Honours ==
(Croatia) Treća HNL – North:

- Winners (1): 1999–2000
