= NK Slaven Belupo =

Association football club in Croatia

Slaven Belupo
- Full name: Nogometni klub Slaven Belupo
- Nickname: Farmaceuti (The Pharmacists)
- Short name: SLB
- Founded: 1907; 119 years ago
- Ground: Gradski Stadion Ivan Kušek-Apaš
- Capacity: 3,134
- President: Robert Markulin
- Head Coach: Silvijo Čabraja
- League: Croatian Football League
- 2025–26: Croatian Football League, 8th of 10
- Website: nk-slaven-belupo.hr
Home colours	Away colours	Third colours

Nogometni klub Slaven Belupo (English: Slaven Belupo Football Club), often referred to as Slaven Belupo, is a Croatian professional football club based in the city of Koprivnica in the north of Croatia. They play their home matches at Gradski Stadion in Koprivnica. They compete in the Croatian Football League (HNL), the top tier of Croatian football.

== History ==
The first football club in Koprivnica was founded in June 1907, when a student team was formed and named Đački nogometni klub, which is Croatian for Students' Football Club. The name Slaven first appeared when a sports club named HŠK Slaven was founded by the members of the Friedrich family on 20 August 1912 and this is considered to be the foundation date of the present-day club. The club won the Croatian championship in 1920, which was one of the Yugoslav regional championships. Slaven was subsequently renamed HŠK Victorija, but disbanded six years later due to financial difficulties. Subsequently, the city of Koprivnica was without a football club for four years, between 1926 and 1930.

Between 1930 and 1945, the club was known as HŠK Koprivnica, HŠK Danica and RNHŠK Sloga, before the name Slaven returned with the foundation of FD Slaven. From 1953, the club was known as SD Podravka, before being renamed to NK Slaven in 1958. The name Slaven remains until today, with occasional changes to the name of the club's principal sponsors. The club was thus known as NK Slaven Bilokalnik between 1992 and 1994, after which it was changed to its current name following a sponsorship agreement with the Koprivnica-based pharmaceutical company Belupo.

Slaven gained their first promotion to the Prva HNL in 1997 and have never been relegated. In 2000, they finished fifth in the Prva HNL and qualified for the UEFA Intertoto Cup. In their first Intertoto Cup appearance, they managed to reach the third round of the competition before being eliminated by Czech club Sigma Olomouc after losing 2–0 at home and getting a goalless draw on the road. One year later, they repeated the success and were eliminated by renowned English club Aston Villa with a 3–2 aggregate defeat. In their next two Intertoto Cup appearances, they were even more successful as they reached the semifinals of the competition on both occasions. They were eliminated after losing to renowned clubs Stuttgart from Germany and Lille from France, respectively. Their last Intertoto Cup appearance in 2005 ended in the third round with a 4–0 aggregate defeat to Spanish club Deportivo La Coruña, having lost the first leg by 1–0 and the second leg by 0–3.

Slaven Belupo heads the all-time Intertoto Cup table being the most successful team in history of this tournament.

In 2007, the club reached the Croatian Cup final for the first time, after defeating defending Cup holders HNK Rijeka 3–2 on aggregate. In the final, they lost to Dinamo Zagreb 2–1 on aggregate. Despite having lost the final, Slaven qualified for the UEFA Cup for the first time in their history, since Dinamo had already qualified for the UEFA Champions League by virtue of having won the Prva HNL.

Slaven reached the second qualifying round of the 2007–08 UEFA Cup, defeating Albanian side Teuta Durrës 8–4 on aggregate before being eliminated after a 4–2 aggregate defeat to Turkish club Galatasaray. In 2008, Slaven finished runners-up in the Croatian league, which remains their best domestic result to date.

On 28 August 2008 Slaven Belupo qualified for the 2008–09 UEFA Cup by beating Aris of Greece 2–1 on aggregate, thereby achieving arguably the best result in the history of the club.

Slaven finished 3rd in the 2011–12 1. HNL, qualifying for the 2012–13 UEFA Europa League. After defeating Portadown 10–2 on aggregate they bowed out to Spanish giants Athletic Bilbao 4–3 on aggregate.

In 2016, Slaven defeated HNK Rijeka 4–2 on aggregate in the 2015–16 Croatian Football Cup semi-final, reaching the final for the second time in their history.

== Supporters ==
In 2023 group of fans organized themselves into a fan group under the name Podravske štuke (Podravska pike).

== Players ==
=== Current squad ===
As of 15 November 2026

Note: Flags indicate national team as defined under FIFA eligibility rules; some limited exceptions apply. Players may hold more than one non-FIFA nationality.

No.	Pos.	Nation	Player
2	DF	CRO	Vinko Međimorec
3	DF	CRO	Antonio Jakir
4	DF	CRO	Dominik Kovačić
5	DF	CRO	Ivan Cvetko
6	DF	CRO	Tomislav Božić (captain)
7	FW	CRO	Marko Dabro
8	FW	CRO	Lovro Banovec
10	MF	MDA	Mihail Caimacov
11	FW	CRO	Josip Mitrović
12	GK	SLO	Maj Pavli
15	DF	ALB	Jon Mersinaj (on loan from Osijek)
16	MF	CRO	Leon Geci
17	MF	CRO	Filip Mažar

No.	Pos.	Nation	Player
18	DF	CRO	Filip Krušelj
21	MF	CRO	Ljuban Crepulja
22	MF	NGR	Adetunji Rasaq Adeshina (on loan from LASK)
23	MF	ISL	Arnór Gauti Jónsson
27	FW	CRO	Alen Grgić
32	GK	CRO	Ivan Čović
33	DF	CRO	Karlo Išasegi
35	DF	MKD	Leonard Zuta
77	DF	JPN	Itsuki Urata
88	MF	CRO	David Bosak
90	FW	MKD	Ilija Nestorovski
99	DF	CRO	Filip Kutleša

=== Dual registration ===
Note: Flags indicate national team as defined under FIFA eligibility rules; some limited exceptions apply. Players may hold more than one non-FIFA nationality.

No.	Pos.	Nation	Player
1	GK	CRO	Teo Kolar (at Koprivnica)
13	DF	CRO	Ante Bilobrk (at Koprivnica)
14	FW	BOT	Losika Ratshukudu (at Koprivnica)
19	FW	CRO	Lukas Zahora (at Koprivnica)
20	DF	CRO	Marko Petrović (at Koprivnica)
24	MF	CRO	Leon Bošnjak (at Koprivnica)

No.	Pos.	Nation	Player
26	MF	CRO	Lovro Lončarić (at Koprivnica)
28	FW	CRO	Patrik Marić (at Koprivnica)
29	MF	CRO	Lovre Lončar (at Koprivnica)
45	FW	CRO	Vito Papac (at Koprivnica)
—	MF	BIH	Vito Medić (at Hrvace)
—	FW	CMR	Joseph Essomba Essomba (at Koprivnica)

=== Other players under contract ===
Note: Flags indicate national team as defined under FIFA eligibility rules; some limited exceptions apply. Players may hold more than one non-FIFA nationality.

No.	Pos.	Nation	Player
—	GK	CRO	Matija Jesenović

=== Out on loan ===
Note: Flags indicate national team as defined under FIFA eligibility rules; some limited exceptions apply. Players may hold more than one non-FIFA nationality.

No. / Pos. / Nation / Player; 15 / DF / CRO / Petar Krešimir Balen (at Mladost Ždralovi until 31 December 2026)	No. / Pos. / Nation / Player; — / GK / CRO / Antun Marković (at Jarun until 31 May 2027)

== Personnel ==
Position	Staff
Head coach	(Croatia) Silvijo Čabraja
Assistant coach	(Croatia) Vladimir Balagović (Croatia) Mateas Delić (Croatia) Ante Stipić (Croatia) Filip Đurec
Goalkeeping coach	(Croatia) Mario Hontić
Fitness coach	(Croatia) Igor Nikšić
Team manager	(Croatia) Robert Kerovec
Director of football	(Croatia) Dejan Šomoci
Physiotherapists	(Croatia) Dino Ratković (Croatia) Jan Šumandl (Croatia) Dominik Pakasin (Croatia) Robert Krčmar
Doctors	(Croatia) Andrej Mraz (Croatia) Srđan Vukosavljević (Croatia) Igor Mraz
Kit manager	(Croatia) Toni Kuzmić

Last updated: 12 October 2026
Source: NK Slaven Belupo official website

== Recent seasons ==
Season	League									Cup	European competitions		Top league scorer	
Season	Division	P	W	D	L	F	A	Pts	Pos	Cup	European competitions			
Player	Goals													
1992	3. HNL North	14	7	2	5	30	19	16	3rd ↑					
1992–93	2. HNL North	30	11	6	13	47	52	28	10th					
1993–94	2. HNL North	30	14	5	11	53	38	33	6th					
1994–95	2. HNL North	30	17	6	7	68	25	57	3rd	R1				
1995–96	2. HNL North	30	25	2	3	81	13	77	1st ↑	R2				
1996–97	1B. HNL	30	16	6	8	51	26	54	2nd ↑	R2				
1997–98	1. HNL	32	11	5	16	31	56	38	9th	R2			Markovinović	6
1998–99	1. HNL	32	10	9	13	39	44	39	7th	SF			Slišković	7
1999–00	1. HNL	33	12	13	8	34	34	49	5th	QF			Dodik	13
2000–01	1. HNL	32	11	11	10	39	37	44	5th	R2	Intertoto Cup	R3	Dodik	16
2001–02	1. HNL	30	11	9	10	34	36	41	6th	R1	Intertoto Cup	R3	Kovačić	9
2002–03	1. HNL	32	12	4	16	37	36	40	7th	R2	Intertoto Cup	SF	Dodik	12
2003–04	1. HNL	32	10	10	12	37	39	40	9th	R2			Posavec	11
2004–05	1. HNL	32	12	9	11	37	41	45	6th	QF	Intertoto Cup	SF	Karabogdan	10
2005–06	1. HNL	32	10	11	11	46	48	41	8th	QF	Intertoto Cup	R3	Dodik / Musa / Vručina	8
2006–07	1. HNL	33	14	7	12	40	37	49	5th	RU			Vručina	11
2007–08	1. HNL	33	16	6	11	45	29	54	2nd	QF	UEFA Cup	QR2	Poljak	8
2008–09	1. HNL	33	16	7	10	46	39	55	4th	QF	UEFA Cup	R1	Vručina	14
2009–10	1. HNL	30	11	10	9	44	45	43	7th	QF	Europa League	QR3	Delić	6
2010–11	1. HNL	30	10	10	10	34	30	40	7th	SF			Benko	8
2011–12	1. HNL	30	14	10	6	41	27	52	3rd	R2			Benko	7
2012–13	1. HNL	33	10	9	14	35	50	39	8th	SF	Europa League	QR3	Vugrinec	8
2013–14	1. HNL	36	7	11	18	46	65	32	9th	SF			Vugrinec	8
2014–15	1. HNL	36	11	9	16	38	49	42	6th	R2			Mirić	10
2015–16	1. HNL	36	10	12	14	41	42	42	7th	RU			Ejupi	16
2016–17	1. HNL	36	9	11	16	36	45	38	7th	QF			Héber / Ivanovski	10
2017–18	1. HNL	36	11	10	15	35	45	43	6th	R2			Ivanovski	15
2018–19	1. HNL	36	7	16	13	41	53	37	7th	QF			Krstanović	7
2019–20	1. HNL	36	10	9	17	34	51	39	7th	SF			Krstanović	12
2020–21	1. HNL	36	7	13	16	36	53	34	7th	QF			Krstanović	8
2021–22	1. HNL	36	9	9	18	35	54	36	7th	QF			Krstanović	10
2022–23	1. HNL	36	10	13	13	27	46	43	8th	SF			Hoxha	7
2023–24	1. HNL	36	9	6	21	43	69	33	9th	R2			Mioč	10
2024–25	1. HNL	36	13	9	14	42	45	48	5th	RU			Nestorovski	8
2025–26	1. HNL	36	10	11	15	46	61	41	8th	SF			Mitrović	8

== European record ==
=== Summary ===
Competition	Pld	W	D	L	GF	GA	Last season played
UEFA Cup / Europa League	20	10	2	8	48	24	2012–13
Intertoto Cup	34	17	7	10	50	29	2005
Total	54	27	9	18	98	53	

Source: uefa.com, Last updated on 9 August 2012
Pld = Matches played; W = Matches won; D = Matches drawn; L = Matches lost; GF = Goals for; GA = Goals against

=== By result ===
Overall	Pld	W	D	L	GF	GA	GD
Home	27	18	4	5	65	21	+44
Away	27	9	5	13	33	32	+1
Total	54	27	9	18	98	53	+45

Last updated: 9 August 2012

=== By season ===
Season	Competition	Round	Opponent	Home	Away	Agg
2000–01	Intertoto Cup	R1	(Northern Ireland) Glenavon	3–0	1–1	4–1
2000–01	Intertoto Cup	R2	(Poland) Zagłębie Lubin	0–0	1–1	1–1 (a)
2000–01	Intertoto Cup	R3	(Czech Republic) Sigma Olomouc	1–1	0–1	1–2
2001–02	Intertoto Cup	R1	(Cyprus) Anorthosis	7–0	2–0	9–0
2001–02	Intertoto Cup	R2	(France) Bastia	1–0	1–0	2–0
2001–02	Intertoto Cup	R3	(England) Aston Villa	2–1	0–2	2–3
2002–03	Intertoto Cup	R1	(Slovakia) OD Trenčín	5–0	1–3	6–3
2002–03	Intertoto Cup	R2	(Portugal) Belenenses	2–0	1–0	3–0
2002–03	Intertoto Cup	R3	(Bulgaria) Marek Dupnitsa	3–1	3–0	6–1
2002–03	Intertoto Cup	SF	(Germany) VfB Stuttgart	0–1	1–2	1–3
2004–05	Intertoto Cup	R1	(Malta) Hibernians	3–0	1–2	4–2
2004–05	Intertoto Cup	R2	(Albania) Vllaznia	2–0	0–1	2–1
2004–05	Intertoto Cup	R3	(Slovakia) Spartak Trnava	0–0	2–2	2–2 (a)
2004–05	Intertoto Cup	SF	(France) Lille	1–1	0–3	1–4
2005–06	Intertoto Cup	R1	(Slovenia) Drava Ptuj	1–0	1–0	2–0
2005–06	Intertoto Cup	R2	(Romania) Gloria Bistriţa	3–2	1–0	4–2
2005–06	Intertoto Cup	R3	(Spain) Deportivo La Coruña	0–3	0–1	0–4
2007–08	UEFA Cup	QR1	(Albania) Teuta	6–2	2–2	8–4
2007–08	UEFA Cup	QR2	(Turkey) Galatasaray	1–2	1–2	2–4
2008–09	UEFA Cup	QR1	(Malta) Marsaxlokk	4–0	4–0	8–0
2008–09	UEFA Cup	QR2	(Greece) Aris	2–0	0–1	2–1
2008–09	UEFA Cup	R1	(Russia) CSKA Moscow	1–2	0–1	1–3
2009–10	Europa League	QR1	(Malta) Birkirkara	1–0	0–0	1–0
2009–10	Europa League	QR2	(North Macedonia) Milano Kumanovo	8–2	4–0	12–2
2009–10	Europa League	QR3	(Norway) Tromsø	0–2	1–2	1–4
2012–13	Europa League	QR2	(Northern Ireland) Portadown	6–0	4–2	10–2
2012–13	Europa League	QR3	(Spain) Athletic Bilbao	2–1	1–3	3–4

Last updated on 9 August 2012

=== Player records ===
- Most appearances in UEFA club competitions: 34 appearances
  - (Croatia) Petar Bošnjak
- Top scorers in UEFA club competitions: 14 goals
  - (Bosnia and Herzegovina) Marijo Dodik

== Notable players ==
To appear in this section a player must have:

- Played at least 150 league games for the club;
- Scored at least 50 league goals for the club; or
- Played at least one international match for their national team while playing for NK Slaven Belupo.

Years in brackets indicate their spells at the club.

- (United States) Roy Ferenčina (1997–2005)
- (Bosnia and Herzegovina) Marijo Dodik (1998–2007)
- (Croatia) Petar Bošnjak (1999–2008)
- (Croatia) Srebrenko Posavec (2000–05, 2006–10)
- (Croatia) Bojan Vručina (2004–10, 2011–12)
- (Croatia) Silvio Rodić (2005–14)
- (Croatia) Mateas Delić (2006–10, 2012–16, 2018–)
- (Croatia) Vedran Purić (2008–2018)
- (Kosovo) Fidan Aliti (2016–2017)
- (Bosnia and Herzegovina) Nikola Katić (2016–2018)

== Historical list of coaches ==
- (Croatia) Ivan Bedi (1996-1997)
- (Croatia) Miroslav Buljan (1997)
- (Croatia) Marijan Vlak (1998)
- (Croatia) Luka Bonačić (1999–00)
- (Croatia) Mladen Frančić (2000–01)
- (Croatia) Dražen Besek (2001–02)
- (Croatia) Rajko Magić (2002–03)
- (Croatia) Ivan Bedi (2003–04)
- (Croatia) Milo Nižetić (2004)
- (Croatia) Branko Karačić (2004–05)
- (Croatia) Nikola Jurčević (2005)
- (Croatia) Elvis Scoria (2006–07)
- (Croatia) Krunoslav Jurčić (2007–08)
- (Croatia) Mile Petković (2008–09)
- (Croatia) Milivoj Bračun (2009)
- (Croatia) Zlatko Dalić (2009–10)
- (Croatia) Mile Petković (2010–11)
- (United States) Roy Ferenčina (2011–13)
- (Croatia) Roman Sović (2013)
- (Croatia) Ivan Katalinić (2013)
- (Croatia) Mladen Frančić (2013–14)
- (Croatia) Elvis Scoria (2014)
- (Croatia) Ante Čačić (2014–15)
- (Croatia) Željko Kopić (2015–17)
- (Croatia) Tomislav Ivković (2017–18)
- (Croatia) Ivica Sertić (2018–19)
- (Bosnia and Herzegovina) Tomislav Stipić (2019–21)
- (Croatia) Dean Klafurić (2021)
- (Croatia) Zoran Zekić (2021–23)
- (Netherlands) Ricardo Moniz (2023)
- (United States) Roy Ferenčina (2023–2024)
- (Bosnia and Herzegovina) Ivan Radeljić (2024)
- (Croatia) Mario Kovačević (2024–2025)
- (Croatia) Mario Gregurina (2025–2026)
- (Croatia) Silvijo Čabraja (2026–present)
