= 2017–18 FK Sarajevo season =

Sarajevo
2017–18 season
- Owner: Vincent Tan
- Chairman: Valentin Ilievski
- Manager: Mehmed Janjoš (until 24 July); Senad Repuh (from 25 July to 22 August); Husref Musemić (from 26 August)
- Stadium: Asim Ferhatović Hase Stadium
- Premier League BiH: 3rd
- Cup of BiH: Round of 32
- UEFA Europa League: First qualifying round
- Top goalscorer: League: Mersudin Ahmetović (14); All: Mersudin Ahmetović (14)
- Highest home attendance: 12,000 vs Zaria Bălți (6 July 2017)
- Lowest home attendance: 1,000
- Average home league attendance: 3,676
- Biggest win: Sarajevo 5−0 Čelik (29 October 2017)
- Biggest defeat: Sarajevo 2−3 Krupa (1 October 2017)
Home colours	Away colours	Third colours

The 2017–18 Sarajevo season was the club's 69th season in history, and their 24th consecutive season in the top flight of Bosnian football, the Premier League of BiH. Besides competing in the Premier League, the team also competed in the National Cup. Sarajevo competed in the qualifications for the UEFA Europa League as well.

== Squad information ==
=== First-team squad ===
As of 13 February 2018

Note: Flags indicate national team as defined under FIFA eligibility rules; some limited exceptions apply. Players may hold more than one non-FIFA nationality.

No.	Pos.	Nation	Player
2	DF	BIH	Dušan Hodžić
5	MF	SRB	Miloš Stanojević
6	DF	CRO	Saša Novaković
11 7	FW	BIH	Mićo Kuzmanović
8	MF	BIH	Elvis Sarić
9	FW	BIH	Mersudin Ahmetović
10	MF	BIH	Amar Rahmanović
11	FW	MKD	Krste Velkoski (captain)
13	MF	BIH	Anel Hebibović
15	MF	BIH	Samir Radovac (3rd captain)
17	MF	BIH	Elvedin Herić

No.	Pos.	Nation	Player
18	DF	BIH	Nihad Mujakić
19	DF	BIH	Almir Bekić
20	FW	MKD	Marjan Altiparmakovski
21	MF	CRO	Ljuban Crepulja
22	DF	MNE	Aleksandar Šofranac
24	MF	BIH	Sanjin Lelić
25	MF	GHA	Joachim Adukor
26	MF	BIH	Emir Halilović
30	GK	SRB	Bojan Pavlović (vice-captain)
34	GK	BIH	Adi Adilović
77	MF	BIH	Said Husejinović

=== Youth academy players ===
FK Sarajevo Academy players that received a first-team squad call-up.

No. / Pos. / Nation / Player; 4 / DF / BIH / Halid Šabanović	No. / Pos. / Nation / Player; 23 / MF / BIH / Alen Mustafić

== Transfers ==
=== In ===
Date	Pos.	Player	From	Fee	Ref.
30 May 2017	MF	(Bosnia and Herzegovina) Mićo Kuzmanović	(Bosnia and Herzegovina) Mladost Doboj Kakanj	Free transfer	
20 June 2017	MF	(Bosnia and Herzegovina) Amar Rahmanović	(Slovenia) Celje	Free transfer	
28 June 2017	FW	(North Macedonia) Krste Velkoski	(Thailand) Nakhon Ratchasima	Free transfer	
22 July 2017	MF	(Serbia) Miloš Stanojević	(Serbia) Radnički Niš	Free transfer	
15 August 2017	DF	(Ghana) Joachim Adukor	(Greece) OFI Crete	Free transfer	
8 January 2018	DF	(Montenegro) Aleksandar Šofranac	(Belgium) Cercle Brugge	Free transfer	
14 January 2018	MF	(Bosnia and Herzegovina) Emir Halilović	(Austria) Blau-Weiß Linz	Free transfer	
5 February 2018	MF	(Croatia) Ljuban Crepulja	(Belgium) Mechelen	Free transfer	
7 February 2018	FW	(North Macedonia) Marjan Altiparmakovski	(Lithuania) Sūduva	Free transfer	
10 February 2018	GK	(Bosnia and Herzegovina) Nedin Tucaković	(Bosnia and Herzegovina) Podgrmeč	Free transfer	

=== Out ===
Date	Pos.	Player	To	Fee	Ref.
1 June 2017	GK	(Bosnia and Herzegovina) Emir Plakalo	(Sweden) Rosengård	Contract termination	
4 June 2017	DF	(Montenegro) Saša Balić	(Romania) CFR Cluj	Contract termination	
21 June 2017	FW	(Bosnia and Herzegovina) Hamza Čataković	(Slovakia) Trenčín	€120,000	
2 July 2017	DF	(Bosnia and Herzegovina) Edvin Rastoder	(Bosnia and Herzegovina) Olimpik	Contract termination	
2 July 2017	DF	(Bosnia and Herzegovina) Adnan Kovačević	(Poland) Korona Kielce	End of contract	
2 July 2017	FW	(Bosnia and Herzegovina) Amer Bekić	(Kazakhstan) Tobol	End of contract	
2 July 2017	MF	(Bosnia and Herzegovina) Haris Duljević	(Germany) Dynamo Dresden	End of contract	
4 July 2017	MF	(Bosnia and Herzegovina) Edin Rustemović	(Turkey) Adana Demirspor	Contract termination	
29 November 2017	MF	(Bosnia and Herzegovina) Nermin Crnkić	Free agent	Contract termination	
1 January 2018	DF	(Bosnia and Herzegovina) Advan Kadušić	(Bosnia and Herzegovina) Zrinjski Mostar	End of contract	
10 January 2018	DF	(Bosnia and Herzegovina) Perica Ivetić	(Bosnia and Herzegovina) Sloboda Tuzla	Contract termination	
29 January 2018	MF	(Estonia) Frank Liivak	(Estonia) Flora	Contract termination	
30 January 2018	FW	(Bosnia and Herzegovina) Nedim Hadžić	(Portugal) Leixões U19	€300,000	
31 January 2018	DF	(Bosnia and Herzegovina) Rijad Sadiku	(Belgium) Mouscron	€300,000	
31 January 2018	DF	(Bosnia and Herzegovina) Marko Mihojević	(Greece) PAOK	€350,000	
13 February 2018	FW	(Bosnia and Herzegovina) Semir Smajlagić	(Slovenia) Gorica	Contract termination	
Total				€1,070,000	

=== Loans out ===
Start date	End date	Pos.	Player	To	Ref.
22 July 2017	31 December 2017	MF	(Bosnia and Herzegovina) Zoran Blagojević	(Bosnia and Herzegovina) Igman Konjic	
22 July 2017	End of season	DF	(Bosnia and Herzegovina) Mufid Salčinović	(Bosnia and Herzegovina) Igman Konjic	
12 January 2018	End of season	MF	(Bosnia and Herzegovina) Nemanja Anđušić	(Bosnia and Herzegovina) Čelik Zenica	
21 January 2018	End of season	DF	(Bosnia and Herzegovina) Selmir Pidro	(Bosnia and Herzegovina) Bosna Visoko	
12 February 2018	End of season	MF	(Bosnia and Herzegovina) Zoran Blagojević	(Bosnia and Herzegovina) Zvijezda 09	
12 February 2018	End of season	GK	(Bosnia and Herzegovina) Vladan Kovačević	(Bosnia and Herzegovina) Sloboda Mrkonjić Grad	

== Kit ==
Supplier	Sponsors	
(United States) Nike, Inc.	(Turkey) Turkish Airlines	Front
(United States) Nike, Inc.	(Bosnia and Herzegovina) Pomozi.ba	Shorts

== Pre-season and friendlies ==
Win Draw Loss Fixtures

23 June 2017 Friendly	Sarajevo (Bosnia and Herzegovina)	1−3	(Bosnia and Herzegovina) Krupa	Travnik
18:00 CEST (UTC+2)	Sarić 38'	Report		Stadium: Stadion Pirota

15 July 2017 Friendly	Sarajevo (Bosnia and Herzegovina)	1−0	(Bosnia and Herzegovina) Olimpik	Butmir
18:30 CEST (UTC+2)	Hadžić 71'	Report		Stadium: Butmir Training Centre

5 September 2017 Friendly	GOŠK Gabela (Bosnia and Herzegovina)	1−2	(Bosnia and Herzegovina) Sarajevo	Gabela
17:00 CEST (UTC+2)		Report	Velkoski 20'; Ahmetović 25'	Referee: Goran Paradžik (Ljubuški)

26 September 2017 Friendly	Sarajevo (Bosnia and Herzegovina)	4−1	(Bosnia and Herzegovina) Olimpik	Butmir
16:00 CEST (UTC+2)	Anđušić 4'; Novaković 9'; Lelić 19'; Husejinović (penalty scored)	Report		Stadium: Butmir Training Centre; Referee: Admir Šehović

4 October 2017 Friendly	Podrinje Janja (Bosnia and Herzegovina)	0−5	(Bosnia and Herzegovina) Sarajevo	Janja
16:00 CEST (UTC+2)		Report	Ahmetović 14', 42'; Husejinović 55', 68'

10 October 2017 Friendly	Sarajevo (Bosnia and Herzegovina)	7−0	(Bosnia and Herzegovina) Radnik Hadžići	Butmir
15:30 CEST (UTC+2)	Anđušić 31'; Hadžić 55', 75'; Smajlagić 57', 57', 65', 82'	Report		Stadium: Butmir Training Centre

17 October 2017 Friendly	Sarajevo (Bosnia and Herzegovina)	4−0	(Bosnia and Herzegovina) Bosna Visoko	Butmir
14:30 CEST (UTC+2)	Herić 16'; Smajlagić 29', 68'; Crnkić 41'	Report		Stadium: Butmir Training Centre

25 October 2017 Friendly	Sarajevo (Bosnia and Herzegovina)	3−1	(Bosnia and Herzegovina) Igman Konjic	Butmir
	Husejinović 22'; Lelić 60', 67'	Report		Stadium: Butmir Training Centre

1 November 2017 Friendly	Sarajevo (Bosnia and Herzegovina)	5−0	(Bosnia and Herzegovina) Velež Mostar	Butmir
	Crnkić 1'; Smajlagić 12', 47'; Hadžić 63'; Husejinović 74'	Report		Stadium: Butmir Training Centre

8 November 2017 Friendly	TOŠK Tešanj (Bosnia and Herzegovina)	0−4	(Bosnia and Herzegovina) Sarajevo	Tešanj
13:30 CEST (UTC+1)		Report	Bekić 15'; Kadušić 59' (pen.); Smajlagić 71'; Husejinović 73'	Stadium: Gradski stadion Luke (Tešanj); Attendance: 500

14 November 2017 Friendly	Sarajevo (Bosnia and Herzegovina)	7−2	(Bosnia and Herzegovina) Moševac	Butmir
13:30 CEST (UTC+1)	Husejinović 4'; Rahmanović 17', 50'; Herić 35'; Crnkić 52'; Anđušić 85'	Report		Stadium: Butmir Training Centre

17 January 2018 Friendly	GOŠK Gabela (Bosnia and Herzegovina)	0−2	(Bosnia and Herzegovina) Sarajevo	Čitluk
14:00 CEST (UTC+1)		Report	Hebibović 10'; Rahmanović 43'	Stadium: Stadion Bare

20 January 2018 Friendly	Velež Mostar (Bosnia and Herzegovina)	1−1	(Bosnia and Herzegovina) Sarajevo	Mostar
14:00 CEST (UTC+1)		Report	Halilović 33'	Stadium: Stadion Rođeni (training ground)

29 January 2018 Friendly	Qarabağ (Azerbaijan)	0−2	(Bosnia and Herzegovina) Sarajevo	Antalya, Turkey
15:30 CEST (UTC+1)		Report	Rahmanović 35'; Kuzmanović 79'	Stadium: Calista Sport Centar

2 February 2018 Friendly	Sarajevo (Bosnia and Herzegovina)	3−2	(Russia) Kuban Krasnodar	Antalya, Turkey
16:30 CEST (UTC+1)	Velkoski (penalty missed); Hebibović 59'; Halilović 74'; Kuzmanović 88'	Report		Stadium: Titanic Sport Centar

4 February 2018 Friendly	Sarajevo (Bosnia and Herzegovina)	1−2	(Ukraine) Mariupol	Antalya, Turkey
15:00 CEST (UTC+1)	Velkoski 46'	Report		Stadium: Titanic Sport Centar

8 February 2018 Friendly	Sarajevo (Bosnia and Herzegovina)	2−0	(Montenegro) Budućnost Podgorica	Antalya, Turkey
16:00 CEST (UTC+1)	Ahmetović 13'; Rahmanović 59'	Report		Stadium: Miracle Sport Centar

14 February 2018 Friendly	Sarajevo (Bosnia and Herzegovina)	2−1	(Bosnia and Herzegovina) Bosna Visoko	Butmir
14:30 CEST (UTC+1)	Altiparmakovski 9'; Kurdić 81'	Report		Stadium: Butmir Training Centre

25 March 2018 Friendly	Sarajevo (Bosnia and Herzegovina)	4−0	(Bosnia and Herzegovina) Slavija Sarajevo	Butmir
	Lelić 51'; Husejinović (penalty scored)	Report		Stadium: Butmir Training Centre

== Competitions ==
=== Overview ===
Competition	First match	Last match	Starting round	Final position	Record							
Competition	First match	Last match	Starting round	Final position	Pld	W	D	L	GF	GA	GD	Win %
Premier League	23 July 2017	19 May 2018	Matchday 1	3rd	32	17	5	10	58	28	+30	53.13
Cup of BiH	20 September 2017		First round	First round	1	0	1	0	0	0	+0	0.00
Europa League	29 June 2017	6 July 2017	First qualifying round	First qualifying round	2	1	0	1	3	3	+0	50.00
Total					35	18	6	11	61	31	+30	51.43

Source: Competitions

=== Premier League ===
==== Regular season ====
===== League table =====
Pos	Team	Pld	W	D	L	GF	GA	GD	Pts	Qualification
2	Željezničar Sarajevo	22	16	2	4	37	16	+21	50	Qualification for the Championship round
3	Široki Brijeg	22	13	3	6	37	17	+20	42	Qualification for the Championship round
4	Sarajevo	22	12	4	6	44	19	+25	40	Qualification for the Championship round
5	Krupa	22	9	8	5	29	23	+6	35	Qualification for the Championship round
6	Radnik Bijeljina	22	9	5	8	21	24	−3	32	Qualification for the Championship round

Source: Football Association of Bosnia and Herzegovina, Soccerway, UEFA
Rules for classification: 1) Points; 2) Goal difference; 3) Goals scored; 4) Head-to-head points; 5) Head-to-head goal difference; 6) Head-to-head away goals (only if two teams); 7) Head-to-head goals scored; 8) Goal difference; 9) Play-off. (Criteria 2 and 3 are not used to decide champion, UEFA competition qualification, or relegation)

==== Results summary ====
Overall								Home						Away					
Pld	W	D	L	GF	GA	GD	Pts	W	D	L	GF	GA	GD	W	D	L	GF	GA	GD
22	12	4	6	44	19	+25	40	5	2	4	21	9	+12	7	2	2	23	10	+13

Source: sportsport.ba

==== Results by round ====
Round	1	2	3	4	5	6	7	8	9	10	11	12	13	14	15	16	17	18	19	20	21	22
Ground	H	A	H	A	H	A	H	H	A	H	A	A	H	A	H	A	H	A	A	H	A	H
Result	L	W	L	D	L	D	W	W	W	L	W	W	W	W	W	L	W	W	L	D	W	D
Position	8	6	7	8	9	9	9	7	5	7	6	4	4	4	4	4	4	3	4	4	4	4

Source: Competitions
A = Away; H = Home; W = Win; D = Draw; L = Loss

===== Matches =====
23 July 2017 1	Sarajevo	1−2	Zrinjski	Sarajevo
19:00	Velkoski 45+1'; Hebibović (yellow card) 50'	SportSport; YouTube		Stadium: Asim Ferhatović Hase Stadium; Attendance: 4,100; Referee: Dragan Petrović (Banja Luka)

30 July 2017 2	Čelik	0−2	Sarajevo	Zenica
19:30		FK Sarajevo; YouTube	Rahmanović (yellow card) 51' (goal) 54'; Hadžić 76' (yellow card); Kadušić (yellow card) 90+2'	Stadium: Bilino Polje Stadium; Attendance: 6,000; Referee: Zoran Grbić (Prijedor)

6 August 2017 3	Sarajevo	0−1	GOŠK	Sarajevo
20:00	Sarić (yellow card) 43'	SportSport; YouTube		Stadium: Asim Ferhatović Hase Stadium; Attendance: 2,500; Referee: Miloš Gigović (Gradiška)

13 August 2017 4	Mladost	1−1	Sarajevo	Doboj, Kakanj
17:30		FK Sarajevo	Rahmanović (yellow card) 6'; Stanojević (yellow card) 29'; Ahmetović 89'; Anđušić (yellow card) 90+2'	Stadium: MGM Farm Arena; Attendance: 2,000; Referee: Vladimir Bjelica (Istočno Sarajevo)

19 August 2017 5	Sarajevo	0−1	Željezničar	Sarajevo
20:00	Ivetić (red card) 3'; Kadušić (yellow card) 10'; Mihojević (yellow card) 29'; Stanojević (yellow card) 29'; Rahmanović (penalty missed) 57'; Novaković (yellow card) 57'	Klix; FK Sarajevo; Bakljada; YouTube		Stadium: Asim Ferhatović Hase Stadium; Attendance: 11,000; Referee: Tomislav Čuić (Tomislavgrad)

27 August 2017 6	Borac	1−1	Sarajevo	Banja Luka
20:00		FK Sarajevo; YouTube	Hodžić (yellow card) 30'; Mihojević (yellow card) 42' (goal) 52'; Stanojević (yellow card) 58'; Bekić (yellow card) 67'; Rahmanović (yellow card) 68'; Ahmetović (yellow card) 87'; Ihtijarević (red card) 90+6'	Stadium: Banja Luka City Stadium; Attendance: 7,500; Referee: Goran Paradžik (Ljubuški)

9 September 2017. 7	Sarajevo	4−0	Vitez	Sarajevo
16:30	Ahmetović 47' 67'; Velkoski 55'; Hadžić 85'	FK Sarajevo; SportSport; YouTube		Stadium: Asim Ferhatović Hase Stadium; Attendance: 1,500; Referee: Zoran Soknić (Istočno Sarajevo)

16 September 2017 8	Sarajevo	2−0	Široki Brijeg	Sarajevo
19:00	Velkoski 4'; Stanojević (yellow card) 29'; Ahmetović 74'	FK Sarajevo; YouTube		Stadium: Asim Ferhatović Hase Stadium; Attendance: 4,000; Referee: Vladimir Bjelica (Istočno Sarajevo)

23 September 2017 9	Radnik	1−4	Sarajevo	Bijeljina
16:00		SportSport; YouTube	Velkoski (penalty scored); Rahmanović (yellow card) 15'; Hodžić (yellow card) 51'; Ahmetović 54' 70'; Mihojević (yellow card) 60' (goal) 79'	Stadium: Bijeljina City Stadium; Attendance: 1,000; Referee: Tomislav Čuić (Tomislavgrad)

1 October 2017 10	Sarajevo	2−3	Krupa	Sarajevo
16:00	Bekić (yellow card) 56'; Sarić 66'; Velkoski (yellow card) 67'; Hebibović (yellow card) 77'; Ahmetović 80' (yellow card) 81'; Ivetić (yellow card) 83'	FK Sarajevo; SCsport; YouTube		Stadium: Asim Ferhatović Hase Stadium; Attendance: 3,000; Referee: Ilija Živković (Orašje)

14 October 2017 11	Sloboda	1−3	Sarajevo	Tuzla
18:00		FK Sarajevo; YouTube	Bekić (yellow card) 9'; Velkoski 19'; Kuzmanović (yellow card) 25'; Ahmetović 61' 67'; Hadžić (yellow card) 90+2'	Stadium: Tušanj City Stadium; Attendance: 3,000; Referee: Vladimir Bjelica (Istočno Sarajevo)

21 October 2017 12	Zrinjski	1−3	Sarajevo	Mostar
19:00		SportSport; YouTube	Kuzmanović 36'; Sarić 43' (yellow card) 88'; Rahmanović 79'; Hadžić (yellow card) 90+2'	Stadium: Stadion pod Bijelim Brijegom; Attendance: 3,500; Referee: Elvis Mujić (Banovići)

29 October 2017 13	Sarajevo	5−0	Čelik	Sarajevo
19:00	Velkoski (penalty scored); Ivetić 23'; Rahmanović 40'; Ahmetović 45'; Lelić 47'; Hadžić (yellow card) 64'	FK Sarajevo sport1 YouTube Horde; YouTube		Stadium: Asim Ferhatović Hase Stadium; Attendance: 6,000; Referee: Dragan Petrović (Banja Luka)

5 November 2017 14	GOŠK	0−2	Sarajevo	Gabela
13:30		FK Sarajevo; YouTube	Ahmetović 9'; Hodžić (yellow card) 36'; Hebibović (yellow card) 59'; Velkoski 71'	Stadium: Stadium Perica-Pero Pavlović; Attendance: 1,000; Referee: Zoran Grbić (Prijedor)

18 November 2017 15	Sarajevo	4−2	Mladost	Sarajevo
16:00	Stanojević (yellow card) 19'; Sarić 28'; Own goal 45+1'; Husejinović 51'; Velkoski 79'; Ivetić (yellow card) 90+3'	FK Sarajevo; Facebook; YouTube		Stadium: Asim Ferhatović Hase Stadium; Attendance: 2,900; Referee: Miloš Gigović (Gradiška)

27 November 2017 16	Željezničar	2−1	Sarajevo	Sarajevo
13:00		BHFudbal; YouTube	Stanojević (yellow card) 45+1'; Sarić (yellow card) 74'; Rahmanović 86' (yellow card) 88'; Ahmetović (yellow card) 90+5'	Stadium: Grbavica Stadium; Attendance: 5,500; Referee: Irfan Peljto (Sarajevo)

2 December 2017 17	Sarajevo	3−0	Borac	Sarajevo
13:00	Hebibović 2' 90+2'; Adukor 29'	FK Sarajevo; SportSport; YouTube		Stadium: Asim Ferhatović Hase Stadium; Attendance: 1,500; Referee: Emir Spahalić (Mostar)

10 December 2017 18	Vitez	0−3	Sarajevo	Vitez
14:00		FK Sarajevo; YouTube	Ahmetović 6' 76'; Bekić 16'	Stadium: Gradski stadion (Vitez); Attendance: 350; Referee: Dragan Petrović (Banja Luka)

18 February 2018 19	Široki Brijeg	2−1	Sarajevo	Široki Brijeg
17:30		FK Sarajevo	Rahmanović (yellow card) 55'; Stanojević (yellow card) 59'; Halilović 64'	Stadium: Stadion Pecara; Attendance: 2,500; Referee: Elvis Mujić (Banovići)

25 February 2018 20	Sarajevo	0−0	Radnik	Sarajevo
14:30	Adukor (yellow card) 64' (yellow-red card) 89'	FK Sarajevo; SportSport		Stadium: Asim Ferhatović Hase Stadium; Attendance: 1,500; Referee: Goran Paradžik (Ljubuški)

3 March 2018 21	Krupa	1−2	Sarajevo	Krupa na Vrbasu
14:30		FK Sarajevo	Hebibović 3'; Bekić (yellow card) 25'; Sarić (yellow card) 47'; Stanojević (yellow card) 56'; Halilović 66'; Mustafić (yellow card) 69'	Stadium: Gradski Stadion (Krupa na Vrbasu); Attendance: 800; Referee: Tomislav Čuić (Tomislavgrad)

7 March 2018 22	Sarajevo	0−0	Sloboda	Sarajevo
15:00	Musemić (red card) 45'	FK Sarajevo; SportSport		Stadium: Asim Ferhatović Hase Stadium; Attendance: 2,000; Referee: Dragan Petrović (Banja Luka)

==== Championship round ====
===== League table =====
Pos	Team	Pld	W	D	L	GF	GA	GD	Pts	Qualification
1	Zrinjski Mostar (C)	32	21	6	5	58	30	+28	69	Qualification for the Champions League first qualifying round
2	Željezničar Sarajevo	32	19	6	7	49	30	+19	63	Qualification for the Europa League first qualifying round
3	Sarajevo	32	17	5	10	58	28	+30	56	Qualification for the Europa League first qualifying round
4	Široki Brijeg	32	16	8	8	52	28	+24	56	Qualification for the Europa League first qualifying round
5	Radnik Bijeljina	32	12	9	11	35	38	−3	45	

Source: Football Association of Bosnia and Herzegovina, UEFA, Soccerway
Rules for classification: 1) Points; 2) Goal difference; 3) Goals scored; 4) Head-to-head points; 5) Head-to-head goal difference; 6) Head-to-head away goals (only if two teams); 7) Head-to-head goals scored; 8) Goal difference; 9) Play-off. (Criteria 2 and 3 are not used to decide champion, UEFA competition qualification, or relegation)
(C) Champions

==== Results summary ====
Overall								Home						Away					
Pld	W	D	L	GF	GA	GD	Pts	W	D	L	GF	GA	GD	W	D	L	GF	GA	GD
32	17	5	10	58	28	+30	56	9	3	4	31	11	+20	8	2	6	27	17	+10

Source: sportsport.ba

==== Results by round ====
Round	1	2	3	4	5	6	7	8	9	10
Ground	A	A	H	A	H	H	H	A	H	A
Result	L	L	W	L	D	W	W	W	W	L
Position	4	4	4	4	4	4	4	3	3	3

Source: Competitions
A = Away; H = Home; W = Win; D = Draw; L = Loss

===== Matches =====
11 March 2018 23	Široki Brijeg	1−0	Sarajevo	Široki Brijeg
18:00		FK Sarajevo	Halilović (yellow card) 90+1'	Stadium: Stadion Pecara; Attendance: 2,500; Referee: Zoran Grbić (Prijedor)

18 March 2018 24	Radnik	1−0	Sarajevo	Bijeljina
15:00			Rahmanović (yellow card) 17'	Stadium: Gradski stadion (Bijeljina); Attendance: 700; Referee: Ermin Sivac (Zenica)

31 March 2018 25	Sarajevo	1−0	Krupa	Sarajevo
18:00	Rahmanović (yellow card) 36'; Velkoski 45+1'; Sarić (yellow card) 59'	Klix		Stadium: Asim Ferhatović Hase Stadium; Attendance: 1,000; Referee: Ilija Živković (Orašje)

7 March 2018 26	Zrinjski	1−0	Sarajevo	Mostar
18:30		FK Sarajevo	Mujakić (yellow card) 45'; Stanojević (yellow card) 63'; Kuzmanović (yellow card) 65'	Stadium: Stadion pod Bijelim Brijegom; Attendance: 3,500; Referee: Elvis Mujić (Banovići)

15 April 2018 27	Sarajevo	0−0	Željezničar	Sarajevo
16:30	Kuzmanović (yellow card) 76'; Velkoski (yellow card) 89'	FK Sarajevo		Stadium: Asim Ferhatović Hase Stadium; Attendance: 6,000; Referee: Elvis Mujić (Banovići)

22 April 2018 28	Sarajevo	2−0	Široki Brijeg	Sarajevo
17:00	Halilović (yellow card) 45+1'; Own goal 58'; Sarić 71'	FK Sarajevo		Stadium: Asim Ferhatović Hase Stadium; Attendance: 1.500; Referee: Vladimir Bjelica (Istočno Sarajevo)

29 April 2018 29	Sarajevo	3−1	Radnik	Sarajevo
17:00	Velkoski 7' 21'; Šabanović (yellow card) 49'; Sarić (yellow card) 65'; Rahmanović 90+3' (yellow card)	FK Sarajevo		Stadium: Asim Ferhatović Hase Stadium; Attendance: 1,000; Referee: Dragan Petrović (Banja Luka)

5 May 2018 30	Krupa	2−3	Sarajevo	Krupa na Vrbasu
14:00		FK Sarajevo	Kuzmanović 32' 90+4'; Velkoski (penalty scored) 45'	Stadium: Gradski Stadion (Krupa na Vrbasu); Attendance: 550; Referee: Ermin Sivac (Zenica)

13 May 2018 31	Sarajevo	4−1	Zrinjski	Sarajevo
17:00	Sarić 33'; Ahmetović 40'; Kuzmanović 45+1' 62'	FK Sarajevo		Stadium: Asim Ferhatović Hase Stadium; Attendance: 1,000; Referee: Zoran Grbić (Prijedor)

19 May 2018 32	Željezničar	2−1	Sarajevo	Sarajevo
17:00		FK Sarajevo	Mustafić (yellow card) 33'; Adukor 37'	Stadium: Grbavica Stadium; Attendance: 5,500; Referee: Adis Mulahasanović

=== Cup of Bosnia and Herzegovina ===
==== Round of 32 ====
20 September 2017	Mladost Doboj Kakanj	0−0 (4−3 p)	Sarajevo	Doboj
16:00 CEST (UTC+2)	Mujagić (yellow card) 60' (yellow-red card) 85'; Mišić (yellow card) 62'; Benović (yellow card) 79'	Report	Sarić (yellow card) 37'; Stanojević (yellow card) 69'	Stadium: MGM Farm Arena; Attendance: 600; Referee: Ilija Živković (Orašje)
	Penalties
	Dilaver (penalty missed); Vazda (penalty scored); Benović (penalty scored); Mišić (penalty scored); Šećerović (penalty scored)		(penalty scored) Velkoski; (penalty missed) Ahmetović; (penalty scored) Hadžić; (penalty scored) Bekić; (penalty missed) Sarić

=== UEFA Europa League ===
==== First qualifying round ====
29 June 2017 First leg	Zaria Bălți (Moldova)	2−1	(Bosnia and Herzegovina) Sarajevo	Chișinău, Moldova
20:00 EEST (UTC+3)	Zahynaylov 7'; Gómez 33'; Raţă (yellow card) 67'; Focşa (yellow card) 73'; Novicov (yellow card) 90+1'	Report	Mihojević (yellow card) 40', (goal) 74'; Rahmanović (yellow card) 67'	Stadium: Zimbru Stadium; Attendance: 2,500; Referee: Alexandros Aretopoulos (Greece)

6 July 2017 Second leg	Sarajevo (Bosnia and Herzegovina)	2−1 (a.e.t.) (3–3 agg.) (5−6 p)	(Moldova) Zaria Bălți	Sarajevo, Bosnia and Herzegovina
20:00 CEST (UTC+2)	Hebibović 13'; Kadušić 35' (pen.); Mihojević (yellow card) 37'; Sarić (yellow card) 76'; Crnkić (penalty missed) 87'; Hodžić (yellow card) 111'	Report	Yermak (yellow card) 35'; Mihojević 60' (o.g.); Mihaliov (yellow card) 65'; Focşa (yellow card) 83'; Suvorov (yellow card) 88'; Novicov (red card) 90+4'	Stadium: Asim Ferhatović Hase Stadium; Attendance: 12,000; Referee: Aleksandrs Anufrijevs (Latvia)
	Penalties
	Hodžić (penalty scored); Ivetić (penalty scored); Mihojević (penalty missed); Bekić (penalty scored); Sarić (penalty scored); Anđušić (penalty scored); Kuzmanović (penalty missed)		(penalty scored) Slinkin; (penalty scored) Suvorov; (penalty scored) Golovatenco; (penalty scored) Zahynaylov; (penalty missed) Yermak; (penalty scored) Mihaliov; (penalty scored) Focșa

== Statistics ==
=== Appearances and goals ===
No.	Pos	Nat	Player	Total		Premier League		Cup of BiH		Europa League	
No.	Pos	Nat	Player	Apps	Goals	Apps	Goals	Apps	Goals	Apps	Goals
Goalkeepers
30	GK	(Serbia) SRB	Bojan Pavlović	35	0	32	0	1	0	2	0
34	GK	(Bosnia and Herzegovina) BIH	Adi Adilović	0	0	0	0	0	0	0	0
Defenders
2	DF	(Bosnia and Herzegovina) BIH	Dušan Hodžić	28	0	17+8	0	1	0	1+1	0
4	DF	(Bosnia and Herzegovina) BIH	Halid Šabanović	9	0	7+2	0	0	0	0	0
6	DF	(Croatia) CRO	Saša Novaković	17	0	15	0	0	0	2	0
18	DF	(Bosnia and Herzegovina) BIH	Nihad Mujakić	18	0	15+3	0	0	0	0	0
19	DF	(Bosnia and Herzegovina) BIH	Almir Bekić	27	1	24	1	1	0	2	0
22	DF	(Montenegro) MNE	Aleksandar Šofranac	6	0	5+1	0	0	0	0	0
Midfielders
5	MF	(Serbia) SRB	Miloš Stanojević	25	0	23+1	0	1	0	0	0
8	MF	(Bosnia and Herzegovina) BIH	Elvis Sarić	31	5	28	5	1	0	2	0
10	MF	(Bosnia and Herzegovina) BIH	Amar Rahmanović	28	5	19+6	5	0+1	0	1+1	0
13	MF	(Bosnia and Herzegovina) BIH	Anel Hebibović	29	4	23+3	3	1	0	2	1
15	MF	(Bosnia and Herzegovina) BIH	Samir Radovac	11	0	6+3	0	0	0	2	0
17	MF	(Bosnia and Herzegovina) BIH	Elvedin Herić	10	0	2+8	0	0	0	0	0
21	MF	(Croatia) CRO	Ljuban Crepulja	11	0	5+6	0	0	0	0	0
23	MF	(Bosnia and Herzegovina) BIH	Alen Mustafić	9	0	4+5	0	0	0	0	0
24	MF	(Bosnia and Herzegovina) BIH	Sanjin Lelić	6	1	2+3	1	1	0	0	0
25	MF	(Ghana) GHA	Joachim Adukor	20	2	18+2	2	0	0	0	0
26	MF	(Bosnia and Herzegovina) BIH	Emir Halilović	13	2	13	2	0	0	0	0
77	MF	(Bosnia and Herzegovina) BIH	Said Husejinović	7	1	2+5	1	0	0	0	0
Forwards
7	FW	(Bosnia and Herzegovina) BIH	Mićo Kuzmanović	27	5	14+10	5	0+1	0	1+1	0
9	FW	(Bosnia and Herzegovina) BIH	Mersudin Ahmetović	26	14	22+2	14	1	0	1	0
11	FW	(North Macedonia) MKD	Krste Velkoski	33	12	30+2	12	1	0	0	0
20	FW	(North Macedonia) MKD	Marjan Altiparmakovski	2	0	0+2	0	0	0	0	0
Players transferred out during the season
7	MF	(Bosnia and Herzegovina) BIH	Nermin Crnkić	2	0	0	0	0	0	2	0
14	DF	(Bosnia and Herzegovina) BIH	Perica Ivetić	17	1	8+6	1	1	0	1+1	0
16	DF	(Bosnia and Herzegovina) BIH	Marko Mihojević	14	3	10+1	2	1	0	2	1
21	FW	(Bosnia and Herzegovina) BIH	Nedim Hadžić	11	2	2+8	2	0+1	0	0	0
22	MF	(Bosnia and Herzegovina) BIH	Nemanja Anđušić	5	0	0+4	0	0	0	0+1	0
23	MF	(Estonia) EST	Frank Liivak	1	0	0+1	0	0	0	0	0
33	DF	(Bosnia and Herzegovina) BIH	Advan Kadušić	9	1	6+1	0	0	0	1+1	1

Number after the "+" sign represents the number of games player started the game on the bench and was substituted on.

=== Goalscorers ===
Rank	No.	Pos.	Nat.	Player	Premier League	Cup of BiH	Europa League	Total
1	9	FW	(Bosnia and Herzegovina)	Mersudin Ahmetović	14	0	0	14
2	11	FW	(North Macedonia)	Krste Velkoski	12	0	0	12
3	7	FW	(Bosnia and Herzegovina)	Mićo Kuzmanović	5	0	0	5
3	8	MF	(Bosnia and Herzegovina)	Elvis Sarić	5	0	0	5
3	10	MF	(Bosnia and Herzegovina)	Amar Rahmanović	5	0	0	5
6	13	MF	(Bosnia and Herzegovina)	Anel Hebibović	3	0	1	4
7	16	DF	(Bosnia and Herzegovina)	Marko Mihojević	2	0	1	3
8	21	FW	(Bosnia and Herzegovina)	Nedim Hadžić	2	0	0	2
8	25	MF	(Ghana)	Joachim Adukor	2	0	0	2
8	26	MF	(Bosnia and Herzegovina)	Emir Halilović	2	0	0	2
11	14	DF	(Bosnia and Herzegovina)	Perica Ivetić	1	0	0	1
11	19	DF	(Bosnia and Herzegovina)	Almir Bekić	1	0	0	1
11	24	MF	(Bosnia and Herzegovina)	Sanjin Lelić	1	0	0	1
11	33	DF	(Bosnia and Herzegovina)	Advan Kadušić	0	0	1	1
11	77	MF	(Bosnia and Herzegovina)	Said Husejinović	1	0	0	1
Own goals					2	0	0	2
Total					58	0	3	61
