= 2016–17 FK Sarajevo season =

Sarajevo
2016–17 season
- Owner: Vincent Tan
- President: Edis Kusturica; Valentin Ilievski
- Manager: Almir Hurtić (until 29 August); Mehmed Janjoš (from 29 August)
- Stadium: Asim Ferhatović Hase Stadium
- Premier League BiH: 3rd
- Cup of BiH: Runners–up
- Top goalscorer: League: Mersudin Ahmetović (10); All: Mersudin Ahmetović (12)
- Highest home attendance: 12,500 vs Željezničar (16 October 2016)
- Lowest home attendance: 500 vs Kozara (19 October 2016)
- Average home league attendance: 4,190
- Biggest win: Kozara 0–5 Sarajevo (26 October 2016)
- Biggest defeat: Sloboda 3–0 Sarajevo (18 March 2017)
Home colours	Away colours

The 2016–17 Sarajevo season was the club's 68th season in existence, and their 23rd consecutive season in the top flight of Bosnian football, the Premier League of BiH. Besides competing in the Premier League, the team also competed in the National Cup.

== Squad information ==
=== First-team squad ===
As of 20 February 2017

Note: Flags indicate national team as defined under FIFA eligibility rules; some limited exceptions apply. Players may hold more than one non-FIFA nationality.

No.	Pos.	Nation	Player
1	GK	BIH	Emir Plakalo
2	DF	BIH	Dušan Hodžić
3	DF	BIH	Advan Kadušić
4	MF	BIH	Edin Rustemović (vice-captain)
5	DF	BIH	Adnan Kovačević
6	DF	CRO	Saša Novaković
7	MF	BIH	Haris Duljević (captain)
8	MF	BIH	Elvis Sarić
9	MF	BIH	Nermin Crnkić
10	MF	BIH	Said Husejinović
13	MF	BIH	Anel Hebibović
14	DF	MNE	Saša Balić

No.	Pos.	Nation	Player
15	MF	BIH	Samir Radovac (4th captain)
16	DF	BIH	Marko Mihojević (3rd captain)
17	MF	BIH	Elvedin Herić
19	DF	BIH	Almir Bekić
21	MF	BIH	Sanjin Lelić
22	MF	BIH	Nemanja Anđušić
23	MF	EST	Frank Liivak
24	FW	BIH	Mersudin Ahmetović
28	DF	BIH	Perica Ivetić
30	GK	SRB	Bojan Pavlović
33	FW	BIH	Amer Bekić
34	GK	BIH	Adi Adilović

=== Youth academy players ===
FK Sarajevo Academy players that received a first-team squad call-up.

No.	Pos.	Nation	Player
1	GK	BIH	Vladan Kovačević
18	DF	BIH	Nihad Mujakić
35	FW	BIH	Semir Smajlagić

No.	Pos.	Nation	Player
40	FW	BIH	Nedim Hadžić
50	DF	BIH	Rijad Sadiku

== Transfers ==
=== In ===
Date	Pos.	Player	From	Fee	Ref.
6 June 2016	FW	(Bosnia and Herzegovina) Mersudin Ahmetović	(Bosnia and Herzegovina) Sloboda Tuzla	Free transfer	
7 June 2016	DF	(Montenegro) Saša Balić	(Romania) Târgu Mureș	Free transfer	
7 June 2016	DF	(Bosnia and Herzegovina) Dušan Hodžić	(Bosnia and Herzegovina) Radnik Bijeljina	Free transfer	
8 June 2016	MF	(Bosnia and Herzegovina) Elvis Sarić	(Bosnia and Herzegovina) Sloboda Tuzla	Free transfer	
13 June 2016	MF	(Montenegro) Marko Ćetković	(Albania) Laçi	Free transfer	
16 June 2016	MF	(Bosnia and Herzegovina) Nemanja Anđušić	(Bosnia and Herzegovina) Olimpik	Free transfer	
17 June 2016	MF	(Bosnia and Herzegovina) Said Husejinović	(Croatia) Dinamo Zagreb	€50,000	
18 June 2016	GK	(Bosnia and Herzegovina) Adi Adilović	(Bosnia and Herzegovina) Čelik Zenica	Free transfer	
25 June 2016	MF	(Bosnia and Herzegovina) Nermin Crnkić	(Slovakia) Slovan Bratislava	Free transfer	
28 June 2016	DF	(Croatia) Saša Novaković	(Romania) Voluntari	Free transfer	
18 August 2016	DF	(Bosnia and Herzegovina) Perica Ivetić	(Bosnia and Herzegovina) Sloboda Tuzla	Free transfer	
19 January 2017	MF	(Bosnia and Herzegovina) Sanjin Lelić	(Bosnia and Herzegovina) Olimpik	€25,000	
20 February 2017	MF	(Estonia) Frank Liivak	Free agent	Free transfer	
Total				€75,000	

=== Out ===
Date	Pos.	Player	To	Fee	Ref.
1 June 2016	DF	(Croatia) Tomislav Barbarić	(Belgium) Kortrijk	€350,000	
1 June 2016	MF	(Croatia) Deni Simeunović	(Bosnia and Herzegovina) Radnik Bijeljina	End of contract	
1 June 2016	MF	(Bosnia and Herzegovina) Dario Purić	(Bosnia and Herzegovina) Tekstilac Derventa	End of contract	
1 June 2016	FW	(Bosnia and Herzegovina) Ildar Klarić	(Bosnia and Herzegovina) Branitelj	End of contract	
14 June 2016	FW	(Bosnia and Herzegovina) Ševko Okić	(Bosnia and Herzegovina) Radnik Bijeljina	Contract termination	
15 June 2016	DF	(Slovenia) Denis Kramar	(Iceland) Víkingur Ólafsvík	Contract termination	
23 June 2016	MF	(Brazil) Emerson	Free agent	Contract termination	
23 June 2016	FW	(Brazil) Cezar Augusto	Free agent	Contract termination	
25 June 2016	FW	(Bosnia and Herzegovina) Tarik Handžić	(Bosnia and Herzegovina) Olimpik	Contract termination	
29 June 2016	DF	(Syria) Ahmad Kalasi	(Syria) Al-Ittihad	Contract termination	
30 June 2016	DF	(Bosnia and Herzegovina) Džemal Berberović	Retired		
21 July 2016	FW	(Bosnia and Herzegovina) Adnan Osmanović	(Bosnia and Herzegovina) Olimpik	Contract termination	
2 August 2016	MF	(Serbia) Damjan Krajišnik	(Bosnia and Herzegovina) Podrinje Janja	Contract termination	
5 August 2016	FW	(Croatia) Leon Benko	(Slovenia) Olimpija Ljubljana	Contract termination	
10 January 2017	MF	(Montenegro) Marko Ćetković	(Albania) Partizani Tirana	Contract termination	
Total				€350,000	

=== Loans out ===
Start date	End date	Pos.	Player	To	Ref.
15 June 2016	31 December 2016	GK	(Bosnia and Herzegovina) Emir Plakalo	(Bosnia and Herzegovina) Metalleghe-BSI	
19 January 2017	End of season	DF	(Bosnia and Herzegovina) Edvin Rastoder	(Bosnia and Herzegovina) Bosna Visoko	
19 January 2017	End of season	MF	(Bosnia and Herzegovina) Vedad Gljiva	(Bosnia and Herzegovina) Bosna Visoko	
25 January 2017	End of season	FW	(Bosnia and Herzegovina) Hamza Čataković	(Slovakia) Trenčín	

== Kit ==
Supplier	Sponsors	
(United States) Nike	(Turkey) Turkish Airlines	Front
(United States) Nike	(Bosnia and Herzegovina) Pomozi.ba	Shorts

== Pre-season and friendlies ==
Win Draw Loss Fixtures

25 June 2016 Friendly	Sarajevo (Bosnia and Herzegovina)	8–0	(Bosnia and Herzegovina) Vratnik	Butmir
	Benko; Crnkić; Ahmetović; Bekić	Report		Stadium: Butmir Training Centre

2 July 2016 Friendly	Sarajevo (Bosnia and Herzegovina)	5–0	(Bosnia and Herzegovina) Novi Grad	Butmir
	Husejinović; Duljević; Benko; Sarić; Osmanović	Report		Stadium: Butmir Training Centre

3 July 2016 Friendly	Sarajevo (Bosnia and Herzegovina)	2–1	(Bosnia and Herzegovina) Bosna Visoko	Butmir
18:00 CEST (UTC+2)	Ahmetović; Bekić			Stadium: Butmir Training Centre; Referee: Adis Mulahasanović

7 July 2016 Friendly	Sarajevo (Bosnia and Herzegovina)	3–1	(Croatia) Zagreb	Slovenia
18:00 CEST (UTC+2)	Bekić 27'; Ahmetović 65'; Sarić 75'	Report

9 July 2016 Friendly	Spartak Moscow (Russia)	2–0	(Bosnia and Herzegovina) Sarajevo	Völkermarkt, Austria
17:00 CEST (UTC+2)		Report

10 July 2016 Friendly	Maribor B (Slovenia)	1–4	(Bosnia and Herzegovina) Sarajevo	Slovenj Gradec, Slovenia
17:00 CEST (UTC+2)			Benko 23', 27'; Anđušić 40'; Hebibović 70'

12 July 2016 Friendly	Krasnodar (Russia)	3–1	(Bosnia and Herzegovina) Sarajevo	Villach, Austria
18:15 CEST (UTC+2)		Report	Crnkić 20'

15 July 2016 Friendly	Al-Wehda (Saudi Arabia)	1–0	(Bosnia and Herzegovina) Sarajevo	Völkermarkt, Austria
18:00 CEST (UTC+2)		Report

26 July 2016 Friendly	Travnik (Bosnia and Herzegovina)	2–2	(Bosnia and Herzegovina) Sarajevo	Travnik
17:00 CEST (UTC+2)		Report	Husejinović 65'; Hebibović 70'	Stadium: Stadion Pirota; Referee: Danijel Bojo (Kiseljak)

23 January 2017 Friendly	Brotnjo (Bosnia and Herzegovina)	0–3	(Bosnia and Herzegovina) Sarajevo	Čitluk
15:00 CEST (UTC+2)		Report	Sarić 65'; Hebibović 67'; Hodžić 83'	Stadium: Bare Stadium; Attendance: 500; Referee: Emir Spahalić (Mostar)

28 January 2017 Friendly	Velež Mostar (Bosnia and Herzegovina)	0–0	(Bosnia and Herzegovina) Sarajevo	Čitluk
15:00 CEST (UTC+1)				Attendance: 150; Referee: Darko Obradović (Stolac)

6 February 2017 Friendly	Lokomotiv Tashkent (Uzbekistan)	1–1	(Bosnia and Herzegovina) Sarajevo	Antalya, Turkey
15:00 CEST (UTC+1)		Report	Sarić 21'

9 February 2017 Friendly	Neftchi Fergana (Uzbekistan)	0–1	(Bosnia and Herzegovina) Sarajevo	Antalya, Turkey
15:00 CEST (UTC+1)			Hebibović 11'

12 February 2017 Friendly	Sarajevo (Bosnia and Herzegovina)	0–1	(Ukraine) Mariupol	Antalya, Turkey
15:00 CEST (UTC+1)	Hodžić (red card)	Report

== Competitions ==
=== Overview ===
Competition	First match	Last match	Starting round	Final position	Record							
Competition	First match	Last match	Starting round	Final position	Pld	W	D	L	GF	GA	GD	Win %
Premier League	23 July 2016	28 May 2017	Matchday 1	3rd	32	16	11	5	41	22	+19	50.00
Cup of BiH	21 September 2016	17 May 2017	First round	Runners-up	9	6	2	1	19	7	+12	66.67
Total					41	22	13	6	60	29	+31	53.66

Source: Competitions

=== Premier League ===
==== Regular season ====
===== League table =====
Pos	Team	Pld	W	D	L	GF	GA	GD	Pts	Qualification
1	Zrinjski Mostar	22	13	6	3	38	19	+19	45	Qualification for the Championship round
2	Željezničar Sarajevo	22	13	5	4	28	14	+14	44	Qualification for the Championship round
3	Sarajevo	22	12	7	3	30	16	+14	43	Qualification for the Championship round
4	Radnik Bijeljina	22	10	7	5	31	22	+9	37	Qualification for the Championship round
5	Sloboda Tuzla	22	9	8	5	31	24	+7	35	Qualification for the Championship round

Source: Football Association of Bosnia and Herzegovina, UEFA, Soccerway
Rules for classification: 1) Points; 2) Goal difference; 3) Goals scored; 4) Head-to-head points; 5) Head-to-head goal difference; 6) Head-to-head away goals (only if two teams); 7) Head-to-head goals scored; 8) Goal difference; 9) Play-off. (Criteria 2 and 3 are not used to decide champion, UEFA competition qualification, or relegation)

==== Results summary ====
Overall								Home						Away					
Pld	W	D	L	GF	GA	GD	Pts	W	D	L	GF	GA	GD	W	D	L	GF	GA	GD
22	12	7	3	30	16	+14	43	8	2	1	21	8	+13	4	5	2	9	8	+1

Source: sportsport.ba

==== Results by round ====
Round	1	2	3	4	5	6	7	8	9	10	11	12	13	14	15	16	17	18	19	20	21	22
Ground	A	H	A	H	A	H	A	A	H	A	H	H	A	H	A	H	A	H	H	A	H	A
Result	D	W	D	W	D	L	D	W	W	D	D	D	L	W	W	W	W	W	W	W	W	L
Position	4	2	5	2	3	4	5	4	2	3	5	4	6	4	3	3	2	2	2	2	2	3

Source: Competitions
A = Away; H = Home; W = Win; D = Draw; L = Loss

===== Matches =====
23 July 2016 1	Željezničar	1–1	Sarajevo	Sarajevo
20:30		SportSport; Facebook; Radio Sarajevo	Advan Kadušić (yellow card) 32'; Mersudin Ahmetović 59' (yellow card) 73'; Haris Duljević (yellow card) 87'	Stadium: Stadion Grbavica; Attendance: 12,000; Referee: Ognjen Valjić (Banja Luka)

31 July 2016 2	Sarajevo	2–0	Zrinjski	Sarajevo
19:45	Amer Bekić (yellow card) 23'; Haris Duljević 25'; Saša Balić (yellow card) 44'; Edin Rustemović (yellow card) 45+2'; Saša Novaković (yellow card) 49'; Mersudin Ahmetović 77'	SportSport; YouTube		Stadium: Asim Ferhatović Hase Stadium; Attendance: 6,000; Referee: Zoran Grbić (Prijedor)

6 August 2016 3	Čelik	1–1	Sarajevo	Zenica
17:30		SportSport	Marko Ćetković 76'; Almir Bekić (yellow card) 86'	Stadium: Bilino Polje Stadium; Attendance: 3,500; Referee: Elvis Mujić (Banovići)

10 August 2016 4	Sarajevo	3–2	Krupa	Sarajevo
17:30	Samir Radovac 8'; Marko Mihojević (yellow card) 23'; Elvis Sarić (penalty scored) 61'; Dušan Hodžić (yellow card) 74'; Amer Bekić (yellow card) 78'; Advan Kadušić 89'	SportSport; YouTube		Stadium: Asim Ferhatović Hase Stadium; Attendance: 2,500; Referee: Goran Paradžik (Ljubuški)

13 August 2016 5	Mladost	0–0	Sarajevo	Kakanj
17:30		SportSport	Saša Balić (yellow card) 29'; Nemanja Anđušić (yellow card) 80'	Stadium: MGM Farm Arena; Attendance: 2,500; Referee: Dragan Skakić (Gradiška)

22 August 2016 6	Sarajevo	1–2	Metalleghe-BSI	Sarajevo
17:30	Saša Balić (yellow card) 18'; Haris Duljević (yellow card) 38'; Mersudin Ahmetović 74' (yellow card) 90+4'; Said Husejinović (yellow card) 88'; Almir Bekić (yellow card) 90+2'	SportSport; Klix; YouTube		Stadium: Asim Ferhatović Hase Stadium; Attendance: 1,500; Referee: Ermin Sivac (Zenica)

27 August 2016 7	Radnik	0–0	Sarajevo	Bijeljina
17:30		FK Sarajevo	Saša Novaković (yellow card) 60'; Edin Rustemović (yellow card) 61'; Marko Mihojević (yellow card) 62'; Samir Radovac (yellow card) 65'; Advan Kadušić (yellow card) 85'	Stadium: Bijeljina City Stadium; Attendance: 800; Referee: Goran Paradžik (Ljubuški)

11 September 2016 8	Vitez	0–1	Sarajevo	Vitez
15:30		YouTube	Dušan Hodžić (yellow card) 29'; Mersudin Ahmetović 90'	Stadium: Gradski stadion (Vitez); Attendance: 1,800; Referee: Zoran Grbić (Prijedor)

18 September 2016 9	Sarajevo	1–0	Olimpik	Sarajevo
17:00	Saša Balić 1' (yellow card) 72'; Samir Radovac (yellow card) 62'; Edin Rustemović (yellow card) 66'; Nermin Crnkić (yellow card) 90+1'	FK Sarajevo; YouTube		Stadium: Asim Ferhatović Hase Stadium; Attendance: 2,500; Referee: Adis Mulahasanović

25 September 2016 10	Široki Brijeg	2–2	Sarajevo	Široki Brijeg
19:00		FK Sarajevo; YouTube	Saša Novaković 20'; Saša Balić (red card) 25'; Nermin Crnkić 38' (yellow card) 89'; Elvis Sarić (yellow card) 89'; Nemanja Anđušić (yellow card) 90+3'	Stadium: Stadion Pecara; Attendance: 2,500; Referee: Ognjen Valjić (Banja Luka)

1 October 2016 11	Sarajevo	1–1	Sloboda	Sarajevo
15:00	Mersudin Ahmetović 38'; Elvis Sarić (yellow card) 65'; Nemanja Anđušić (yellow card) 87'	FK Sarajevo; Facebook; YouTube		Stadium: Asim Ferhatović Hase Stadium; Attendance: 3,500; Referee: Vladimir Bjelica (Istočno Sarajevo)

16 October 2016 12	Sarajevo	0–0	Željezničar	Sarajevo
15:00	Marko Ćetković (yellow card) 21'; Edin Rustemović (yellow card) 85'	SportSport; YouTube		Stadium: Asim Ferhatović Hase Stadium; Attendance: 12,500; Referee: Irfan Peljto (Sarajevo)

22 October 2016 13	Zrinjski	1–0	Sarajevo	Mostar
16:00		FK Sarajevo; Hercegovina; YouTube	Elvis Sarić (yellow card) 38'; Samir Radovac (yellow card) 77'	Stadium: Stadion pod Bijelim Brijegom; Attendance: 3,500; Referee: Vladimir Bjelica (Istočno Sarajevo)

30 October 2016 14	Sarajevo	4–0	Čelik	Sarajevo
13:00	Anel Hebibović 12'; Nermin Crnkić 27'; Perica Ivetić (yellow card) 45'; Mersudin Ahmetović 58'; Nermin Crnkić 72'	FK Sarajevo; SportSport; YouTube		Stadium: Asim Ferhatović Hase Stadium; Attendance: 2,000; Referee: Dragan Petrović (Banja Luka)

5 November 2016 15	Krupa	0–1	Sarajevo	Krupa na Vrbasu
13:30		FK Sarajevo; YouTube	Almir Bekić (yellow card) 31'; Saša Balić (yellow card) 49'; Perica Ivetić (yellow card) 69' (yellow-red card) 83'; Mersudin Ahmetović 78'	Stadium: Gradski Stadion (Krupa na Vrbasu); Attendance: 1,500; Referee: Edin Jakupović (Bihać)

20 November 2016 16	Sarajevo	4–3	Mladost	Sarajevo
13:00	Nermin Crnkić 11'; Amer Bekić 14'; Anel Hebibović 22'; Nermin Crnkić 45'; Dušan Hodžić (yellow card) 90+2'	FK Sarajevo; Facebook; YouTube		Stadium: Asim Ferhatović Hase Stadium; Attendance: 3,500; Referee: Emir Spahalić (Mostar)

27 November 2016 17	Metalleghe-BSI	0–2	Sarajevo	Travnik
13:00		FK Sarajevo; Facebook; YouTube	Saša Balić (yellow card) 33'; Edin Rustemović (yellow card) 45+2'; Elvis Sarić 70'; Mersudin Ahmetović 82'; Saša Balić (red card) 87'	Stadium: Stadion Pirota; Attendance: 1,500; Referee: Edin Jakupović (Bihać)

4 December 2016 18	Sarajevo	2–0	Radnik	Sarajevo
13:00	Almir Bekić (yellow card) 23'; Mersudin Ahmetović 60'; Anel Hebibović 71'; Marko Mihojević (yellow card) 54' (yellow-red card) 83'; Perica Ivetić (yellow card) 90+3'	FK Sarajevo; SportSport; YouTube		Stadium: Asim Ferhatović Hase Stadium; Attendance: 4,000; Referee: Ilija Živković (Orašje)

26 February 2017 19	Sarajevo	1–0	Vitez	Sarajevo
13:00	Anel Hebibović 45+1'; Advan Kadušić (yellow card) 75'; Haris Duljević (yellow card) 83'; Edin Rustemović (yellow card) 84'	FK Sarajevo; YouTube		Stadium: Asim Ferhatović Hase Stadium; Attendance: 4,500; Referee: Dragan Petrović (Banja Luka)

4 March 2017 20	Olimpik	0–1	Sarajevo	Sarajevo
15:00		FK Sarajevo sport1 YouTube	Said Husejinović 60'	Stadium: Stadion Otoka; Attendance: 2,200; Referee: Admir Šehović

11 March 2017 21	Sarajevo	2–0	Široki Brijeg	Sarajevo
15:00	Anel Hebibović 7'; Elvis Sarić (yellow card) 25'; Saša Novaković 70'	FK Sarajevo; Klix; YouTube		Stadium: Asim Ferhatović Hase Stadium; Attendance: 6,000; Referee: Ognjen Valjić (Banja Luka)

18 March 2017 22	Sloboda	3–0	Sarajevo	Tuzla
15:00		SportSport; YouTube	Perica Ivetić (yellow card) 35'; Mersudin Ahmetović (yellow card) 45+2'; Marko Mihojević (yellow card) 59'	Stadium: Tušanj City Stadium; Attendance: 3,000; Referee: Edin Jakupović (Bihać)

==== Championship round ====
===== League table =====
Pos	Team	Pld	W	D	L	GF	GA	GD	Pts	Qualification
1	Zrinjski Mostar (C)	32	18	10	4	54	25	+29	64	Qualification for the Champions League second qualifying round
2	Željezničar Sarajevo	32	18	9	5	41	22	+19	63	Qualification for the Europa League first qualifying round
3	Sarajevo	32	16	11	5	41	22	+19	59	Qualification for the Europa League first qualifying round
4	Krupa	32	12	10	10	40	34	+6	46	
5	Sloboda Tuzla	32	11	10	11	39	42	−3	43	
6	Radnik Bijeljina	32	10	10	12	37	39	−2	40	

Source: Football Association of Bosnia and Herzegovina, UEFA, Soccerway
Rules for classification: 1) Points; 2) Goal difference; 3) Goals scored; 4) Head-to-head points; 5) Head-to-head goal difference; 6) Head-to-head away goals (only if two teams); 7) Head-to-head goals scored; 8) Goal difference; 9) Play-off. (Criteria 2 and 3 are not used to decide champion, UEFA competition qualification, or relegation)
(C) Champions

==== Results summary ====
Overall								Home						Away					
Pld	W	D	L	GF	GA	GD	Pts	W	D	L	GF	GA	GD	W	D	L	GF	GA	GD
32	16	11	5	41	22	+19	59	10	5	1	25	10	+15	6	6	4	16	12	+4

Source: sportsport.ba

==== Results by round ====
Round	1	2	3	4	5	6	7	8	9	10
Ground	H	A	H	A	H	A	H	A	H	A
Result	D	W	D	D	D	W	W	L	W	L
Position	3	3	3	3	3	3	2	3	3	3

Source: Competitions
A = Away; H = Home; W = Win; D = Draw; L = Loss

===== Matches =====
2 April 2017 23	Sarajevo	1–1	Radnik	Sarajevo
19:45	Amer Bekić 1' (35 seconds); Nermin Crnkić (yellow card) 75'; Haris Duljević (yellow card) 82'	FK Sarajevo; Y. Bakljade Horde; YouTube		Stadium: Asim Ferhatović Hase Stadium; Attendance: 5,500; Referee: Tomislav Čuić (Tomislavgrad)

5 April 2017 24	Sloboda	0–2	Sarajevo	Tuzla
16:30		FK Sarajevo; YouTube	Anel Hebibović 55'; Dušan Hodžić (yellow card) 67'; Sanjin Lelić (yellow card) 90+2'; Elvis Sarić 90+5'	Stadium: Tušanj City Stadium; Attendance: 2,500; Referee: Goran Paradžik (Ljubuški)

9 April 2017 25	Sarajevo	0–0	Zrinjski	Sarajevo
19:00	Elvis Sarić (penalty missed) 36'; Edin Rustemović (yellow card) 45+1'; Haris Duljević (yellow card) 45+3'	ULTRAS-TIFO; Y. Horde Bakljada; YouTube		Stadium: Asim Ferhatović Hase Stadium; Attendance: 9,500; Referee: Zoran Grbić (Prijedor)

15 April 2017 26	Željezničar	0–0	Sarajevo	Sarajevo
19:30		FK Sarajevo; YouTube	Elvis Sarić (yellow card) 64'; Saša Novaković (yellow card) 76'; Perica Ivetić (yellow card) 86'	Stadium: Stadion Grbavica; Attendance: 13,500; Referee: Admir Šehović

23 April 2017 27	Sarajevo	1–1	Krupa	Sarajevo
17:00	Mersudin Ahmetović 50'; Elvis Sarić (yellow card) 53'	SportSport sport1		Stadium: Asim Ferhatović Hase Stadium; Attendance: 1,500; Referee: Ermin Sivac (Zenica)

29 April 2017 28	Radnik	0–3	Sarajevo	Bijeljina
17:00		FK Sarajevo; YouTube	Dušan Hodžić 55'; Nermin Crnkić (yellow card) 68' (goal) 69' 88'	Stadium: Gradski stadion (Bijeljina); Attendance: 300; Referee: Ilija Živković (Orašje)

5 May 2017 29	Sarajevo	1–0	Sloboda	Sarajevo
19:00	Nermin Crnkić 1' (20 seconds); Marko Mihojević (yellow card) 27'; Mersudin Ahmetović (yellow card) 45'	FK Sarajevo; SportSport; YouTube		Stadium: Asim Ferhatović Hase Stadium; Attendance: 3,500; Referee: Dragan Petrović (Banja Luka)

13 May 2017 30	Zrinjski	3–2	Sarajevo	Mostar
19:00		FK Sarajevo; YouTube	Mehmed Janjoš (red card) 21'; Almir Bekić (yellow card) 28'; Nermin Crnkić 41' (yellow card) 76'; Dušan Hodžić (yellow card) 42'; Elvis Sarić 50'	Stadium: Stadion pod Bijelim Brijegom; Attendance: 3,200; Referee: Elvis Mujić (Banovići)

20 May 2017 31	Sarajevo	1–0	Željezničar	Sarajevo
17:00	Amer Bekić (penalty scored) 21'; Almir Bekić (yellow card) 64'	SportSport; YouTube		Stadium: Asim Ferhatović Hase Stadium; Attendance: 8,000; Referee: Irfan Peljto (Sarajevo)

28 May 2017 32	Krupa	1–0	Sarajevo	Krupa na Vrbasu
17:00		FK Sarajevo; YouTube	Advan Kadušić (yellow card) 90+1'	Stadium: Gradski Stadion (Krupa na Vrbasu); Attendance: 1,200; Referee: Ilija Živković (Orašje)

=== Cup of Bosnia and Herzegovina ===
==== Round of 32 ====
21 September 2016	Sarajevo	2–0	Bratstvo	Sarajevo
17:00	Own goal 22'; Balić (yellow card) 25'; Crnkić 88'	SportSport sport1 YouTube		Stadium: Asim Ferhatović Hase Stadium; Attendance: 1,000; Referee: Zoran Soknić (Istočno Sarajevo)

==== Round of 16 ====
19 October 2016 First leg	Sarajevo	3–1	Kozara	Sarajevo
15:00	Hebibović 8'; Mihojević 53'; Anđušić (yellow card) 79'; Rustemović 82'	FK Sarajevo sport1 YouTube		Stadium: Asim Ferhatović Hase Stadium; Attendance: 500; Referee: Emir Spahalić (Mostar)

26 October 2016 Second leg	Kozara	0–5 (1–8 agg.)	Sarajevo	Gradiška
13:30		FK Sarajevo; YouTube	Am. Bekić 10'; Anđušić (yellow card) 22'; Novaković 26'; Balić (yellow card) 44'; Hebibović 60'; Al. Bekić 72'; Husejinović 90+1'	Stadium: Gradski stadion (Gradiška); Attendance: 300; Referee: Antoni Bandić (Grude)

==== Quarter-finals ====
8 March 2017 First leg	Sarajevo	2–0	Travnik	Sarajevo
15:00	Bekić 4', 33'; Rustemović (yellow card)	FK Sarajevo; Klix; YouTube		Stadium: Asim Ferhatović Hase Stadium; Attendance: 1,000; Referee: Miloš Gigović (Gradiška)

15 March 2017 Second leg	Travnik	2–2 (2–4 agg.)	Sarajevo	Travnik
15:00		SportSport; YouTube	Husejinović 5'; Bekić (yellow card) 45+1'; Ahmetović 55'	Stadium: Stadion Pirota; Attendance: 800; Referee: Zoran Soknić (Istočno Sarajevo)

==== Semi-finals ====
12 April 2017 First leg	Sarajevo	1–1	Mladost	Sarajevo
18:00	Ahmetović 42'; Crnkić (yellow card) 60'	FK Sarajevo; Klix; YouTube		Stadium: Asim Ferhatović Hase Stadium; Attendance: 2,000; Referee: Dragan Petrović (Banja Luka)

19 April 2017 Second leg	Mladost	2–3 (3–4 agg.)	Sarajevo	Doboj
16:30		FK Sarajevo	Sarić (penalty missed); Duljević 46'; Kadušić (yellow card); Crnkić 60'; Kovačević 83' (yellow card) 90+3'; Bekić (yellow card) 90'	Stadium: MGM Farm Arena; Attendance: 800; Referee: Elvis Mujić (Banovići)

==== Final ====
10 May 2017 First leg	Sarajevo	0–1	Široki Brijeg	Sarajevo
18:00	Ahmetović (yellow card) 39'; Hodžić (yellow card) 58'	FK Sarajevo; Klix; Radio Sarajevo		Stadium: Asim Ferhatović Hase Stadium; Attendance: 7,000; Referee: Ognjen Valjić (Banja Luka)

17 May 2017 Second leg	Široki Brijeg	0–1 (1–1 agg.) (4–2 p)	Sarajevo	Široki Brijeg
20:00		YouTube	Am. Bekić (penalty scored); Ivetić (yellow card) 69'	Stadium: Stadion Pecara; Attendance: 5,500; Referee: Edin Jakupović (Bihać)
	Penalties
			(penalty missed) Husejinović; (penalty scored) Al. Bekić; (penalty missed) Rustemović; (penalty scored) Ahmetović

== Statistics ==
=== Appearances and goals ===
No.	Pos	Nat	Player	Total		Premier League		Cup of BiH	
No.	Pos	Nat	Player	Apps	Goals	Apps	Goals	Apps	Goals
Goalkeepers
1	GK	(Bosnia and Herzegovina) BIH	Vladan Kovačević	0	0	0	0	0	0
30	GK	(Serbia) SRB	Bojan Pavlović	33	0	30	0	3	0
34	GK	(Bosnia and Herzegovina) BIH	Adi Adilović	8	0	2	0	6	0
Defenders
2	DF	(Bosnia and Herzegovina) BIH	Dušan Hodžić	33	1	24+3	1	5+1	0
3	DF	(Bosnia and Herzegovina) BIH	Advan Kadušić	24	1	12+6	1	5+1	0
5	DF	(Bosnia and Herzegovina) BIH	Adnan Kovačević	13	1	8+1	0	3+1	1
6	DF	(Croatia) CRO	Saša Novaković	33	3	28	2	5	1
14	DF	(Montenegro) MNE	Saša Balić	19	1	14+1	1	4	0
16	DF	(Bosnia and Herzegovina) BIH	Marko Mihojević	29	1	21+1	0	7	1
18	DF	(Bosnia and Herzegovina) BIH	Nihad Mujakić	1	0	0+1	0	0	0
19	DF	(Bosnia and Herzegovina) BIH	Almir Bekić	33	1	24+2	0	6+1	1
28	DF	(Bosnia and Herzegovina) BIH	Perica Ivetić	31	0	20+3	0	5+3	0
50	DF	(Bosnia and Herzegovina) BIH	Rijad Sadiku	0	0	0	0	0	0
Midfielders
4	MF	(Bosnia and Herzegovina) BIH	Edin Rustemović	28	1	19+3	0	4+2	1
7	MF	(Bosnia and Herzegovina) BIH	Haris Duljević	31	2	24+2	1	5	1
8	MF	(Bosnia and Herzegovina) BIH	Elvis Sarić	34	4	23+4	4	7	0
9	MF	(Bosnia and Herzegovina) BIH	Nermin Crnkić	34	11	25+2	9	5+2	2
10	MF	(Bosnia and Herzegovina) BIH	Said Husejinović	15	3	3+6	1	3+3	2
13	MF	(Bosnia and Herzegovina) BIH	Anel Hebibović	36	8	23+4	6	8+1	2
15	MF	(Bosnia and Herzegovina) BIH	Samir Radovac	18	1	7+7	1	3+1	0
17	MF	(Bosnia and Herzegovina) BIH	Elvedin Herić	4	0	0+3	0	0+1	0
21	MF	(Bosnia and Herzegovina) BIH	Sanjin Lelić	5	0	0+5	0	0	0
22	MF	(Bosnia and Herzegovina) BIH	Nemanja Anđušić	22	0	2+15	0	4+1	0
23	MF	(Estonia) EST	Frank Liivak	4	0	0+2	0	1+1	0
Forwards
24	FW	(Bosnia and Herzegovina) BIH	Mersudin Ahmetović	38	12	29+1	10	3+5	2
33	FW	(Bosnia and Herzegovina) BIH	Amer Bekić	30	7	7+15	3	6+2	4
35	FW	(Bosnia and Herzegovina) BIH	Semir Smajlagič	0	0	0	0	0	0
40	FW	(Bosnia and Herzegovina) BIH	Nedim Hadžić	1	0	0+1	0	0	0
Players transferred out during the season
20	MF	(Montenegro) MNE	Marko Ćetković	11	1	7+3	1	1	0
21	FW	(Croatia) CRO	Leon Benko	1	0	0+1	0	0	0
23	MF	(Bosnia and Herzegovina) BIH	Vedad Gljiva	0	0	0	0	0	0
25	DF	(Bosnia and Herzegovina) BIH	Edvin Rastoder	1	0	0	0	0+1	0

Number after the "+" sign represents the number of games player started the game on the bench and was substituted on.

=== Goalscorers ===
Rank	No.	Pos.	Nat.	Player	Premier League	Cup of BiH	Total
1	24	FW	(Bosnia and Herzegovina)	Mersudin Ahmetović	10	2	12
2	9	MF	(Bosnia and Herzegovina)	Nermin Crnkić	9	2	11
3	13	MF	(Bosnia and Herzegovina)	Anel Hebibović	6	2	8
4	33	FW	(Bosnia and Herzegovina)	Amer Bekić	3	4	7
5	8	MF	(Bosnia and Herzegovina)	Elvis Sarić	4	0	4
6	6	DF	(Croatia)	Saša Novaković	2	1	3
6	10	MF	(Bosnia and Herzegovina)	Said Husejinović	1	2	3
8	7	MF	(Bosnia and Herzegovina)	Haris Duljević	1	1	2
9	2	DF	(Bosnia and Herzegovina)	Dušan Hodžić	1	0	1
9	3	DF	(Bosnia and Herzegovina)	Advan Kadušić	1	0	1
9	4	MF	(Bosnia and Herzegovina)	Edin Rustemović	0	1	1
9	5	DF	(Bosnia and Herzegovina)	Adnan Kovačević	0	1	1
9	14	DF	(Montenegro)	Saša Balić	1	0	1
9	15	MF	(Bosnia and Herzegovina)	Samir Radovac	1	0	1
9	16	DF	(Bosnia and Herzegovina)	Marko Mihojević	0	1	1
9	19	DF	(Bosnia and Herzegovina)	Almir Bekić	0	1	1
9	20	MF	(Montenegro)	Marko Ćetković	1	0	1
Own goals					0	1	1
Total					41	19	60
