= Bojan Pavlović =

Bojan Pavlović may refer to:

- Bojan Pavlović (footballer, born 1986), Serbian football goalkeeper for FK Qarabağ
- Bojan Pavlović (footballer, born 1985), Serbian football midfielder for NK Istra 1961
