= Advan Kadušić =

Bosnian footballer (born 1997)

Personal information
- Date of birth: 14 October 1997 (age 29)
- Place of birth: Zenica, Bosnia and Herzegovina
- Height: 1.77 m (5 ft 10 in)
- Position: Right-back

Team information
- Current team: Istra 1961
- Number: 97

Youth career
- Omladinac Sanica
- Krajina Cazin
- 2013–2015: Sarajevo

Senior career*
Years	Team	Apps	(Gls)
2015–2017	Sarajevo	38	(1)
2017–2020	Zrinjski Mostar	49	(0)
2020–2021	Celje	55	(2)
2022–	Istra 1961	117	(2)

International career
2014	Bosnia and Herzegovina U17	3	(0)
2015	Bosnia and Herzegovina U19	8	(0)
2016–2018	Bosnia and Herzegovina U21	7	(0)
2020	Bosnia and Herzegovina	3	(0)
- * Club domestic league appearances and goals as of 1 June 2026

Advan Kadušić (Bosnian pronunciation: [ǎdʋaːn kǎduʃitɕ]; born 14 October 1997) is a Bosnian professional footballer who plays as a right-back for Croatian HNL club Istra 1961.

Kadušić started his professional career at Sarajevo, before joining Zrinjski Mostar in 2017. Three years later, he moved to Celje. In 2022, he signed with Istra.

A former youth international for Bosnia and Herzegovina, Kadušić made his senior international debut in 2020.

== Club career ==
=== Early career ===
Kadušić started playing football at his local club Omladinac Sanica, and later at Krajina Cazin, before joining Sarajevo's youth academy in 2013. He made his professional debut against Velež on 18 October 2015 at the age of 18. On 10 August 2016, he scored his first professional goal against Krupa, which secured the victory for his team.

In December 2017, Kadušić switched to Zrinjski Mostar.

In January 2020, he moved to Slovenian side Celje. Kadušić left the club in January 2022, with his contract having been terminated by mutual consent. With Celje, Kadušić won the club's first national title, and in his two years at the club, played in 61 matches.

In July 2022, Kadušić joined NK Istra 1961 in Croatia.

== International career ==
Kadušić represented Bosnia and Herzegovina at all youth levels.

In September 2020, he received his first senior call-up, for UEFA Euro 2020 qualifying play-offs against Northern Ireland and 2020–21 UEFA Nations League games against Netherlands and Poland. He debuted against Netherlands on 11 October.

== Career statistics ==
=== Club ===
As of match played 30 April 2023

Appearances and goals by club, season and competition
Club	Season	League			National cup		Continental		Total	
Club	Season	Division	Apps	Goals	Apps	Goals	Apps	Goals	Apps	Goals
Sarajevo	2015–16	Bosnian Premier League	13	0	4	0	0	0	17	0
Sarajevo	2016–17	Bosnian Premier League	18	1	6	0	–		24	1
Sarajevo	2017–18	Bosnian Premier League	7	0	0	0	2 (Note: appearances in UEFA Europa League qualifying)	1 (Note: goal in UEFA Europa League qualifying)	9	1
Sarajevo	Total		38	1	10	0	2	1	50	2
Zrinjski Mostar	2017–18	Bosnian Premier League	10	0	–		–		10	0
Zrinjski Mostar	2018–19	Bosnian Premier League	24	0	4	0	3 (Note: appearances in UEFA Europa League qualifying)	0	31	0
Zrinjski Mostar	2019–20	Bosnian Premier League	15	0	1	0	5 (Note: appearances in UEFA Europa League qualifying)	0	21	0
Zrinjski Mostar	Total		49	0	5	0	8	0	62	0
Celje	2019–20	Slovenian PrvaLiga	16	2	–		–		16	2
Celje	2020–21	Slovenian PrvaLiga	30	0	3	0	2 (Note: appearances in UEFA Champions League qualifying)	0	35	0
Celje	2021–22	Slovenian PrvaLiga	9	0	1	0	–		10	0
Celje	Total		55	2	4	0	2	0	61	2
Istra 1961	2022–23	Croatian Football League	29	0	2	1	–		31	1
Career total			171	3	21	1	12	1	204	5

=== International ===
As of match played 18 November 2020

Appearances and goals by national team and year
National team	Year	Apps	Goals
Bosnia and Herzegovina	2020	3	0
Total		3	0

== Honours ==
Zrinjski Mostar

- Bosnian Premier League: 2017–18

Celje

- Slovenian PrvaLiga: 2019–20
