= Marko Mihojević =

Bosnian footballer (born 1996)

Personal information
- Date of birth: 21 April 1996 (age 30)
- Place of birth: Trebinje, Bosnia and Herzegovina
- Height: 1.88 m (6 ft 2 in)
- Position: Centre-back

Youth career
- Leotar

Senior career*
Years	Team	Apps	(Gls)
2012–2014	Leotar	25	(0)
2014–2018	Sarajevo	53	(2)
2018–2020	PAOK	1	(0)
2018–2019	→ OFI (loan)	22	(0)
2019–2020	→ Erzgebirge Aue (loan)	24	(1)
2020–2023	Göztepe	37	(3)
2024	Radnički 1923	0	(0)
Total		162	(6)

International career
2012	Bosnia and Herzegovina U17	4	(1)
2014–2015	Bosnia and Herzegovina U19	14	(2)
2015–2018	Bosnia and Herzegovina U21	17	(0)
2018–2021	Bosnia and Herzegovina	4	(0)
- * Club domestic league appearances and goals

Marko Mihojević (pronounced [mâːrko mǐxojeʋitɕ]; born 21 April 1996) is a Bosnian former professional footballer who played as a centre-back.

Mihojević started his professional career at Leotar, before joining Sarajevo in 2014. Four years later, he moved to PAOK, who loaned him to OFI later that year and to Erzgebirge Aue in 2019. He signed with Göztepe in 2020. In 2024, he joined Radnički 1923.

A former youth international for Bosnia and Herzegovina, Mihojević made his senior international debut in 2018, earning 4 caps until 2021.

== Club career ==
=== Early career ===
Mihojević came through the youth academy of his hometown club Leotar. He made his professional debut against GOŠK Gabela on 6 October 2012 at the age of 16.

=== Sarajevo ===
In July 2014, Mihojević switched to Sarajevo on a four-year deal. On 28 February 2015, he made his official debut for the team against Zvijezda Gradačac. He won his first trophy with the club on 30 May, when they were crowned league champions.

On 19 October 2016, he scored his first professional goal in a Bosnian Cup game against Kozara Gradiška.

In June 2017, Mihojević was named squad captain.

On 27 August, he scored his first league goal against Borac Banja Luka.

In November, he extended his contract with Sarajevo until June 2020.

=== PAOK ===
In January 2018, Mihojević was transferred to Greek outfit PAOK for an undisclosed fee. On 5 May, he made his competitive debut for the side against Platanias. He won his first title with the club on 12 May, by beating AEK Athens in the Greek Cup final.

In August, Mihojević was sent on a season-long loan to OFI.

In July 2019, he was loaned to German team Erzgebirge Aue until the end of season.

=== Göztepe ===
In September 2020, Mihojević signed a three-year deal with Turkish side Göztepe. He debuted officially for the squad against Fenerbahçe on 18 October. On 16 January 2021, he scored his first goal for the team in a triumph over Konyaspor.

Despite Göztepe's relegation to the 1. Lig in April 2022, he decided to stay at the club.

=== Later stage of career ===
In February 2024, Mihojević moved to Serbian outfit Radnički 1923.

He announced his retirement from football on 27 December 2025.

== International career ==
Mihojević represented Bosnia and Herzegovina at all youth levels.

In January 2018, he received his first senior call-up, for friendly games against the United States and Mexico. He debuted against the former on 28 January.

== Career statistics ==
=== Club ===
Appearances and goals by club, season and competition
Club	Season	League			National cup (Note: Includes Bosnian Cup, Greek Cup, DFB-Pokal, Turkish Cup)		Continental		Total	
Club	Season	Division	Apps	Goals	Apps	Goals	Apps	Goals	Apps	Goals
Leotar	2012–13	Bosnian Premier League	10	0	–		–		10	0
Leotar	2013–14	Bosnian Premier League	15	0	0	0	–		15	0
Leotar	Total		25	0	0	0	–		25	0
Sarajevo	2014–15	Bosnian Premier League	5	0	1	0	0	0	6	0
Sarajevo	2015–16	Bosnian Premier League	15	0	2	0	0	0	17	0
Sarajevo	2016–17	Bosnian Premier League	22	0	7	1	–		29	1
Sarajevo	2017–18	Bosnian Premier League	11	2	1	0	2 (Note: Appearances in UEFA Europa League)	1	14	3
Sarajevo	Total		53	2	11	1	2	1	66	4
PAOK	2017–18	Super League Greece	1	0	0	0	–		1	0
OFI (loan)	2018–19	Super League Greece	22	0	5	0	–		27	0
Erzgebirge Aue (loan)	2019–20	2. Bundesliga	24	1	2	0	–		26	1
Göztepe	2020–21	Süper Lig	21	2	1	0	–		22	2
Göztepe	2021–22	Süper Lig	4	0	0	0	–		4	0
Göztepe	2022–23	1. Lig	12	1	2	0	–		14	1
Göztepe	Total		37	3	3	0	–		40	3
Career total			162	6	21	1	2	1	185	8

=== International ===
Appearances and goals by national team and year
National team	Year	Apps	Goals
Bosnia and Herzegovina
Bosnia and Herzegovina	2018	1	0
Bosnia and Herzegovina	2019	2	0
Bosnia and Herzegovina	2020	0	0
Bosnia and Herzegovina	2021	1	0
Total		4	0

== Honours ==
Sarajevo

- Bosnian Premier League: 2014–15

PAOK

- Greek Cup: 2017–18
