= Nermin Crnkić =

Bosnian American footballer (1992–2023)

Personal information
- Date of birth: 31 August 1992
- Place of birth: Novi Grad, Bosnia and Herzegovina
- Date of death: 5 August 2023 (aged 30)
- Place of death: United States
- Height: 1.75 m (5 ft 9 in)
- Position: Left winger

Senior career*
Years	Team	Apps	(Gls)
2011	Färila	5	(4)
2011	Sandviken		
2012–2013	Flint City Bucks	8	(4)
2013–2016	Jablonec	31	(3)
2013–2014	→ Znojmo (loan)	22	(3)
2016	Slovan Bratislava	9	(2)
2016–2017	Sarajevo	27	(9)
2018	Rot-Weiß Erfurt	11	(2)
2018–2021	Tuzla City	68	(11)
- * Club domestic league appearances and goals

Nermin Crnkić (31 August 1992 – 5 August 2023) was a Bosnian professional footballer who played as a left winger.

== Biography ==
Born in Bosnia and Herzegovina, Crnkić moved to the United States when he was seven years old and later became a citizen.

Crnkić was found dead from a heart attack in his apartment on 5 August 2023 just before his 31st birthday. He had been suffering from health issues for some time.

== Career statistics ==
Appearances and goals by club, season and competition
Club	Season	League			Cup		Continental		Total	
Club	Season	Division	Apps	Goals	Apps	Goals	Apps	Goals	Apps	Goals
Sarajevo	2016–17	Bosnian Premier League	27	9	7	2	—		34	11
Sarajevo	2017–18	Bosnian Premier League	0	0	0	0	2	0	2	0
Sarajevo	Total		27	9	7	2	2	0	36	11
Rot-Weiß Erfurt	2017–18	3. Liga	11	2	—		—		11	2
Tuzla City	2018–19	Bosnian Premier League	25	2	1	0	—		26	2
Tuzla City	2019–20	Bosnian Premier League	18	4	3	0	—		21	4
Tuzla City	2020–21	Bosnian Premier League	25	5	5	0	—		30	5
Tuzla City	Total		68	11	9	0	—		77	11
Career total			106	22	16	2	2	0	124	24

== Honors ==
Jablonec

- Czech Supercup: 2013
