= Frank Liivak =

Estonian footballer (born 1996)

Personal information
- Full name: Frank Liivak
- Date of birth: 7 July 1996 (age 30)
- Place of birth: Rakvere, Estonia
- Height: 1.82 m (6 ft 0 in)
- Position: Forward

Team information
- Current team: FCI Levadia
- Number: 23

Youth career
- 2004–2013: Almere City
- 2006: Tartu Olümpia
- 2013–2014: Napoli

Senior career*
Years	Team	Apps	(Gls)
2015–2016	Alcobendas Sport	46	(5)
2017–2018	Sarajevo	3	(0)
2018–2020	Flora	91	(27)
2021–2022	FCI Levadia	48	(8)
2022–2023	Sligo Rovers	48	(4)
2024–	FCI Levadia	85	(4)

International career^{‡}
2011	Estonia U16	2	(0)
2011–2013	Estonia U17	12	(4)
2013–2014	Estonia U19	12	(5)
2013–2018	Estonia U21	29	(4)
2016–2019	Estonia U23	2	(0)
2014–	Estonia	29	(3)
- * Club domestic league appearances and goals as of 17 November 2026 ‡ National team caps and goals as of 16 November 2026

Frank Liivak (born 7 July 1996) is an Estonian professional footballer who plays as a forward for FCI Levadia and the Estonia national team.

== Club career ==
=== Early career ===
Liivak came through the youth system at Ajax affiliated Almere City FC. In August 2013, he moved to Italian club Napoli. Liivak played for the club's under-19 side in the 2013–14 UEFA Youth League.

In January 2015, Liivak joined Spanish club Alcobendas Sport. He made his senior league debut in the Tercera División on 1 February, in a 0–0 draw against Alcobendas.

=== Sarajevo ===
On 16 February 2017, Liivak signed a three-year contract with Bosnian club Sarajevo. He made his debut in the Bosnian Premier League on 4 March, in a 1–0 away victory over Olimpik.

=== Flora ===
On 29 January 2018, Liivak signed a two-year contract with Estonian club Flora. On 3 March, he made his Meistriliiga debut, in a 1–0 home win over Tulevik.

=== FCI Levadia ===
On 1 February 2021, Liivak signed a two-year contract with Flora's league rivals FCI Levadia.

=== Sligo Rovers ===
On 22 June 2022, it was announced that Liivak had signed for League of Ireland Premier Division club Sligo Rovers. On 7 November 2023 Liivak announced his departure from Sligo Rovers after a disappointing 8th-place finish in the league.

== International career ==
Liivak began his international career for Estonia with the national under-16 team in 2011, and went on to represent the under-17, under-19, under-21, and under-23 national sides.

Liivak made his senior international debut for Estonia on 26 May 2014, in 1–1 home draw against Gibraltar in a friendly. He scored his first goal for Estonia on 1 June 2016, in the fourth minute of injury time of a 2–0 home win over Andorra.

== Personal life ==
Liivak's father, Jaanus Liivak, is a basketball coach and a former basketball player.

== Career statistics ==
=== Club ===
As of match played on 28 October 2023

Appearances and goals by club, season and competition
Club	Season	League			Cup (Note: Includes the Bosnia and Herzegovina Cup, Estonian Cup & FAI Cup)		Europe		Other		Total	
Club	Season	Division	Apps	Goals	Apps	Goals	Apps	Goals	Apps	Goals	Apps	Goals
Alcobendas Sport	2014–15	Tercera División	15	0	—		—		2 (Note: Appearances in Tercera División promotion play-offs)	0	17	0
Alcobendas Sport	2015–16	Tercera División	30	5	—		—		—		30	5
Alcobendas Sport	2016–17	Tercera División	1	0	—		—		0	0	1	0
Alcobendas Sport	Total		46	5	—		—		2	0	48	5
Sarajevo	2016–17	Bosnian Premier League	2	0	2	0	—		—		4	0
Sarajevo	2017–18	Bosnian Premier League	1	0	0	0	0	0	—		1	0
Sarajevo	Total		3	0	2	0	0	0	—		5	0
Flora	2018	Meistriliiga	34	16	2	0	4 (Note: Two appearances in UEFA Champions League, two appearances in UEFA Europa League)	0	2 (Note: One appearance and one goal in Livonia Cup, one appearance and one goal in Estonian Supercup)	2	42	18
Flora	2019	Meistriliiga	31	8	1	0	4 (Note: Appearances in UEFA Europa League)	0	—		36	8
Flora	2020	Meistriliiga	26	3	4	0	4 (Note: One appearance in UEFA Champions League, three appearances in UEFA Europa League)	0	—		34	3
Flora	Total		91	27	7	0	12	0	2	2	112	29
FCI Levadia	2021	Meistriliiga	31	5	5	0	4 (Note: Appearances in UEFA Europa Conference League)	0	—		40	5
FCI Levadia	2022	Meistriliiga	17	3	1	0	0	0	0	0	18	3
FCI Levadia	Total		48	8	6	0	4	0	0	0	58	8
Sligo Rovers	2022	LOI Premier Division	15	4	1	0	5 (Note: Appearances in UEFA Europa Conference League)	0	—		21	4
Sligo Rovers	2023	LOI Premier Division	33	0	1	0	—		—		34	0
Sligo Rovers	Total		40	4	2	0	5	0	—		47	4
Career total			236	44	17	0	21	0	4	2	278	46

=== International ===
As of match played 16 November 2026

Appearances and goals by national team and year
National team	Year	Apps	Goals
Estonia
Estonia	2014	3	0
Estonia	2015	0	0
Estonia	2016	3	1
Estonia	2017	2	1
Estonia	2018	1	0
Estonia	2019	8	0
Estonia	2020	7	1
Estonia	2021	0	0
Estonia	2022	1	0
Estonia	2023	0	0
Estonia	2024	0	0
Estonia	2025	0	0
Estonia	2026	4	0
Total		29	3

=== International goals ===
As of 11 October 2020. Estonia score listed first, score column indicates score after each Liivak goal.

International goals by date, venue, cap, opponent, score, result and competition
No.	Date	Venue	Cap	Opponent	Score	Result	Competition
1	1 June 2016	A. Le Coq Arena, Tallinn, Estonia	5	Andorra	2–0	2–0	Friendly
2	23 November 2017	Port Vila Municipal Stadium, Port Vila, Vanuatu	7	Vanuatu	1–0	1–0	Friendly
3	11 October 2020	A. Le Coq Arena, Tallinn, Estonia	20	North Macedonia	3–1	3–3	2020–21 UEFA Nations League

== Honours ==
Flora

- Meistriliiga: 2019, 2020
- Estonian Cup: 2019–20

FCI Levadia

- Meistriliiga: 2021
- Estonian Cup: 2020–21
- Estonian Supercup: 2022
