= Nedim Hadžić =

Bosnian footballer

Personal information
- Date of birth: 19 March 1999 (age 27)
- Place of birth: Sarajevo, Bosnia and Herzegovina
- Height: 1.84 m (6 ft 0 in)
- Position: Centre-forward

Team information
- Current team: Igman Konjic
- Number: 18

Youth career
- 2007–2017: Sarajevo
- 2018: Leixões

Senior career*
Years	Team	Apps	(Gls)
2017–2018	Sarajevo	11	(2)
2019–2021	Mladost Doboj Kakanj	35	(12)
2021–2022	Slaven Belupo	9	(2)
2022	→ Sloboda Tuzla (loan)	10	(0)
2022–2023	Radomlje	13	(2)
2023–2024	Velež Mostar	6	(1)
2024	GOŠK Gabela	1	(0)
2024–2025	Orijent	4	(1)
2025–2026	Bashkimi	11	(3)
2026–	Igman Konjic	13	(4)

International career
2015–2016	Bosnia and Herzegovina U17	6	(2)
2017–2018	Bosnia and Herzegovina U19	6	(1)
2020	Bosnia and Herzegovina U21	1	(0)
- * Club domestic league appearances and goals as of 12 June 2026

Nedim Hadžić (born 19 March 1999) is a Bosnian professional footballer who plays as a centre-forward for Bosnian First League club Igman Konjic.

== Career statistics ==
=== Club ===
As of 12 May 2021.

Appearances and goals by club, season and competition
Club	Season	League			National cup		Continental		Total	
Club	Season	Division	Apps	Goals	Apps	Goals	Apps	Goals	Apps	Goals
Sarajevo	2016–17	Bosnian Premier League	1	0	0	0	—		1	0
Sarajevo	2017–18	Bosnian Premier League	10	2	1	0	0	0	11	2
Sarajevo	Total		11	2	1	0	0	0	12	2
Mladost Doboj Kakanj	2019–20	Bosnian Premier League	9	3	—		—		9	3
Mladost Doboj Kakanj	2020–21	Bosnian Premier League	26	9	0	0	—		26	9
Mladost Doboj Kakanj	Total		35	12	0	0	0	0	35	12
Career total			46	14	1	0	0	0	47	14

== Honours ==
Sarajevo

- Bosnian Cup runner up: 2016–17
