= Adi Adilović =

Bosnian footballer and coach

Personal information
- Date of birth: 20 February 1983 (age 43)
- Place of birth: SR Bosnia and Herzegovina, SFR Yugoslavia
- Height: 1.88 m (6 ft 2 in)
- Position: Goalkeeper

Youth career
- –2002: Željezničar

Senior career*
Years	Team	Apps	(Gls)
2002–2004	Željezničar		
2004	Koprivnica		
2005	Hrvatski Dragovoljac		
2005–2006	Travnik	26	(0)
2006	Sloboda Tuzla	12	(0)
2007–2008	Interblock	10	(0)
2007	→ Livar (loan)	1	(0)
2009	Olimpik	7	(0)
2010–2011	Travnik	29	(0)
2011–2012	Sarajevo	28	(0)
2012–2013	Panthrakikos	7	(0)
2013–2016	Čelik Zenica	84	(0)
2016–2018	Sarajevo	6	(0)
Total		210	(0)

Managerial career
- 2018–2023: Sarajevo (GK coach)
- 2021–2022: Bosnia and Herzegovina (GK coach)
- 2023: Ludogorets Razgrad (GK coach)
- 2023–2024: Universitatea Craiova (GK coach)
- * Club domestic league appearances and goals

Adi Adilović (born 20 February 1983) is a Bosnian former professional footballer who played as a goalkeeper. Following retirement, he began working as a goalkeeping coach.

== Career statistics ==
=== Club ===
Club	Season	League			Cup		Europe		Total	
Club	Season	Division	Apps	Goals	Apps	Goals	Apps	Goals	Apps	Goals
Interblock	2006–07	Slovenian PrvaLiga	10	0	0	0	—		10	0
Livar (loan)	2007–08	Slovenian PrvaLiga	1	0	0	0	—		1	0
Olimpik	2009–10	Bosnian Premier League	7	0	0	0	—		7	0
Travnik	2010–11	Bosnian Premier League	29	0	0	0	—		29	0
Sarajevo	2011–12	Bosnian Premier League	28	0	4	0	0	0	32	0
Sarajevo	2012–13	Bosnian Premier League	0	0	0	0	4	0	4	0
Sarajevo	Total		28	0	4	0	4	0	36	0
Panthrakikos	2012–13	Super League Greece	7	0	0	0	—		7	0
Čelik Zenica	2012–13	Bosnian Premier League	15	0	0	0	—		15	0
Čelik Zenica	2013–14	Bosnian Premier League	21	0	4	0	—		25	0
Čelik Zenica	2014–15	Bosnian Premier League	21	0	3	0	—		24	0
Čelik Zenica	2015–16	Bosnian Premier League	27	0	3	0	—		30	0
Čelik Zenica	Total		84	0	10	0	0	0	94	0
Sarajevo	2016–17	Bosnian Premier League	2	0	6	0	—		8	0
Sarajevo	2017–18	Bosnian Premier League	4	0	0	0	0	0	4	0
Sarajevo	Total		6	0	6	0	0	0	12	0
Career total			172	0	20	0	4	0	196	0

== Honours ==
Željezničar

- Bosnian Cup: 2002–03

Interblock

- Slovenian Cup: 2007–08

Čelik Zenica

- Bosnian Cup runner-up: 2013–14
