= Dušan Hodžić =

Bosnian footballer

Personal information
- Date of birth: 31 October 1993 (age 33)
- Place of birth: Majdanpek, FR Yugoslavia
- Height: 1.75 m (5 ft 9 in)
- Position: Right-back

Team information
- Current team: Bokelj
- Number: 4

Youth career
- 2003–2011: Obilić

Senior career*
Years	Team	Apps	(Gls)
2012–2014	Mladost Velika Obarska	44	(4)
2014–2015	Velež Mostar	2	(0)
2015	Mladost Velika Obarska	14	(0)
2015–2016	Radnik Bijeljina	26	(2)
2016–2021	Sarajevo	91	(2)
2019	→ Čelik Zenica (loan)	13	(0)
2021–2023	Radnik Surdulica	40	(1)
2023–2024	Tuzla City	22	(0)
2024	Zvijezda Gradačac	9	(0)
2025–	Bokelj	0	(0)
- * Club domestic league appearances and goals as of 2 April 2025

Dušan Hodžić (born 31 October 1993) is a Serbian-Bosnian professional footballer who plays as a right-back for Bokelj.

== Club career ==
He left Sarajevo in June 2021.

On 19 August 2021, he signed with Radnik Surdulica.

== Career statistics ==
=== Club ===
As of match played 16 May 2021.

Appearances and goals by club, season and competition
Club	Season	League			Cup		Continental		Total	
Club	Season	Division	Apps	Goals	Apps	Goals	Apps	Goals	Apps	Goals
Mladost Velika Obarska	2012–13	First League of RS	18	3	—		—		18	3
Mladost Velika Obarska	2013–14	Bosnian Premier League	26	1	2	0	—		28	1
Mladost Velika Obarska	Total		44	4	2	0	—		46	4
Velež Mostar	2014–15	Bosnian Premier League	2	0	—		—		2	0
Mladost Velika Obarska	2014–15	Bosnian Premier League	14	0	2	0	—		16	0
Radnik Bijeljina	2015–16	Bosnian Premier League	26	2	4	1	—		30	3
Radnik Bijeljina	2016–17	Bosnian Premier League	0	0	—		0	0	0	0
Radnik Bijeljina	Total		26	2	4	1	0	0	30	3
Sarajevo	2016–17	Bosnian Premier League	27	1	6	0	—		33	1
Sarajevo	2017–18	Bosnian Premier League	25	0	1	0	2	1	28	1
Sarajevo	2018–19	Bosnian Premier League	3	0	1	0	1	0	5	0
Sarajevo	2019–20	Bosnian Premier League	15	1	2	0	2	0	19	1
Sarajevo	2020–21	Bosnian Premier League	20	0	3	0	2	0	25	0
Sarajevo	Total		90	2	13	0	7	1	110	3
Čelik Zenica (loan)	2018–19	Bosnian Premier League	13	0	—		—		13	0
Career total			188	8	21	1	7	1	216	10

== Honours ==
Mladost Velika Obarska

- First League of RS: 2012–13

Radnik Bijeljina

- Bosnian Cup: 2015–16

Sarajevo

- Bosnian Premier League: 2019–20
- Bosnian Cup: 2020–21
