= Nemanja Anđušić =

Bosnian association football player

Personal information
- Full name: Nemanja Anđušić
- Date of birth: 17 October 1996 (age 30)
- Place of birth: Trebinje, Bosnia and Herzegovina
- Height: 1.78 m (5 ft 10 in)
- Position: Midfielder

Team information
- Current team: Zorya Luhansk
- Number: 7

Youth career
- –2013: Leotar

Senior career*
Years	Team	Apps	(Gls)
2013–2014	Leotar	16	(0)
2014–2016	Sarajevo	0	(0)
2015	→ Travnik (loan)	6	(0)
2016	Olimpik	9	(1)
2016–2018	Sarajevo	21	(0)
2018	→ Čelik Zenica (loan)	14	(4)
2018–2019	Mladost Doboj Kakanj	26	(8)
2019–2020	Trabzonspor	0	(0)
2019–2020	→ Balıkesirspor (loan)	10	(1)
2020–2023	Velež Mostar	81	(17)
2023–2024	Sarajevo	29	(6)
2025	Radnik Bijeljina	15	(5)
2025–	Zorya Luhansk	21	(7)

International career
2015	Bosnia and Herzegovina U19	3	(1)
2017–2018	Bosnia and Herzegovina U21	4	(0)
- * Club domestic league appearances and goals as of 3 June 2026

Nemanja Anđušić (born 17 October 1996) is a Bosnian professional footballer who plays as a midfielder for Ukrainian Premier League club Zorya Luhansk.

== Career statistics ==
=== Club ===
As of match played 31 May 2025

Appearances and goals by club, season and competition
Club	Season	League			National cup (Note: Includes Bosnia and Herzegovina Cup, Turkish Cup)		Continental		Total	
Club	Season	Division	Apps	Goals	Apps	Goals	Apps	Goals	Apps	Goals
Leotar	2012–13	Bosnian Premier League	9	0	—		—		9	0
Leotar	2013–14	Bosnian Premier League	7	0	0	0	—		7	0
Leotar	Total		16	0	0	0	—		16	0
Sarajevo	2014–15	Bosnian Premier League	0	0	0	0	0	0	0	0
Sarajevo	2015–16	Bosnian Premier League	0	0	0	0	0	0	0	0
Sarajevo	Total		0	0	0	0	0	0	0	0
Travnik (loan)	2015–16	Bosnian Premier League	6	0	2	0	—		8	0
Olimpik	2015–16	Bosnian Premier League	9	1	—		—		9	1
Sarajevo	2016–17	Bosnian Premier League	17	0	5	0	—		22	0
Sarajevo	2017–18	Bosnian Premier League	4	0	0	0	1 (Note: Appearance(s) in UEFA Europa League)	0	5	0
Sarajevo	Total		21	0	5	0	1	0	27	0
Čelik Zenica (loan)	2017–18	Bosnian Premier League	14	4	—		—		14	4
Mladost Doboj Kakanj	2018–19	Bosnian Premier League	26	8	0	0	—		26	8
Trabzonspor	2019–20	Süper Lig	0	0	0	0	0	0	0	0
Balıkesirspor (loan)	2019–20	TFF First League	10	1	1	0	—		11	1
Velež Mostar	2020–21	Bosnian Premier League	20	4	1	0	—		21	4
Velež Mostar	2021–22	Bosnian Premier League	29	5	6	2	6 (Note: Appearance(s) in UEFA Europa Conference League)	1	41	8
Velež Mostar	2022–23	Bosnian Premier League	27	7	6	2	2	0	35	9
Velež Mostar	2023–24	Bosnian Premier League	5	1	0	0	—		5	1
Velež Mostar	Total		81	17	13	4	8	1	102	22
Sarajevo	2023–24	Bosnian Premier League	22	6	4	1	—		26	7
Sarajevo	2024–25	Bosnian Premier League	7	0	0	0	4	0	11	0
Sarajevo	Total		29	6	4	1	4	0	37	7
Radnik Bijeljina	2024–25	Bosnian Premier League	15	5	1	0	—		16	5
Career total			227	42	26	5	13	1	266	48

== Honours ==
Sarajevo

- Bosnian Premier League: 2014–15

Velež Mostar

- Bosnian Cup: 2021–22
