= Bojan Pavlović (footballer, born 1986) =

Serbian footballer (born 1986)

Bojan Pavlović Бојан Павловић
Personal information
- Date of birth: 8 November 1986 (age 39)
- Place of birth: Loznica, SFR Yugoslavia
- Height: 1.90 m (6 ft 3 in)
- Position: Goalkeeper

Team information
- Current team: Sloga Doboj
- Number: 25

Senior career*
Years	Team	Apps	(Gls)
2007–2011	Red Star Belgrade	1	(0)
2004	→ Grafičar Beograd (loan)	2	(0)
2005	→ Palilulac Beograd (loan)	0	(0)
2005	→ Posavac (loan)	10	(0)
2006	→ Grafičar Beograd (loan)	15	(0)
2006–2007	→ Radnički Pirot (loan)	35	(0)
2007–2008	→ Bežanija (loan)	9	(0)
2008–2009	→ Makedonija GP (loan)	26	(0)
2011–2012	Qarabağ	38	(0)
2012–2013	Hapoel Ashkelon	13	(0)
2013–2014	OFK Beograd	14	(0)
2014–2015	Zestaponi	14	(0)
2015–2019	Sarajevo	74	(0)
2019	→ Čelik Zenica (loan)	13	(0)
2019–2020	Čelik Zenica	21	(0)
2020–2024	Borac Banja Luka	49	(0)
2024–	Sloga Doboj	20	(0)
- * Club domestic league appearances and goals as of 10 May 2026

Bojan Pavlović (Serbian Cyrillic: Бојан Павловић; born 8 November 1986) is a Serbian professional footballer who plays as a goalkeeper for Bosnian Premier League club Sloga Doboj.

== Career statistics ==
=== Club ===
As of match played 10 May 2026

Appearances and goals by club, season and competition
Club	Season	League			National cup (Note: Includes Israel State Cup, Serbian Cup, Bosnian Cup)		Continental		Total	
Club	Season	Division	Apps	Goals	Apps	Goals	Apps	Goals	Apps	Goals
Bežanija (loan)	2007–08	Serbian SuperLiga	9	0	—		2 (Note: Appearances in UEFA Cup)	0	11	0
Red Star Belgrade	2009–10	Serbian SuperLiga	1	0	—		5 (Note: Appearances in UEFA Europa League)	0	6	0
Qarabağ	2010–11	Azerbaijan Premier League	10	0	—		—		10	0
Qarabağ	2011–12	Azerbaijan Premier League	28	0	—		5	0	33	0
Qarabağ	Total		38	0	—		5	0	43	0
Hapoel Ashkelon	2012–13	Liga Leumit	13	0	1	0	—		14	0
OFK Beograd	2013–14	Serbian SuperLiga	14	0	1	0	—		15	0
Zestaponi	2013–14	Umaglesi Liga	5	0	—		—		5	0
Zestaponi	2014–15	Umaglesi Liga	9	0	—		2	0	11	0
Zestaponi	Total		14	0	—		2	0	16	0
Sarajevo	2015–16	Bosnian Premier League	10	0	2	0	—		12	0
Sarajevo	2016–17	Bosnian Premier League	30	0	3	0	—		33	0
Sarajevo	2017–18	Bosnian Premier League	32	0	1	0	2	0	35	0
Sarajevo	2018–19	Bosnian Premier League	2	0	0	0	4	0	6	0
Sarajevo	Total		74	0	6	0	6	0	86	0
Čelik Zenica (loan)	2018–19	Bosnian Premier League	13	0	—		—		13	0
Čelik Zenica	2019–20	Bosnian Premier League	21	0	0	0	—		21	0
Čelik Zenica	Total		34	0	0	0	—		34	0
Borac Banja Luka	2020–21	Bosnian Premier League	29	0	2	0	2	0	33	0
Borac Banja Luka	2021–22	Bosnian Premier League	10	0	3	0	2 (Note: Appearances in UEFA Europa Conference League)	0	15	0
Borac Banja Luka	2022–23	Bosnian Premier League	8	0	0	0	2	0	10	0
Borac Banja Luka	2023–24	Bosnian Premier League	2	0	1	0	—		3	0
Borac Banja Luka	Total		49	0	6	0	6	0	61	0
Sloga Doboj	2024–25	Bosnian Premier League	15	0	0	0	—		15	0
Sloga Doboj	2025–26	Bosnian Premier League	5	0	2	0	—		7	0
Sloga Doboj	2026–27	Bosnian Premier League	0	0	0	0	—		0	0
Sloga Doboj	Total		20	0	2	0	—		22	0
Career total			266	0	16	0	26	0	308	0

== Honours ==
Makedonija Gjorče Petrov

- Macedonian First League: 2008–09

Red Star Belgrade

- Serbian Cup: 2009–10

Borac Banja Luka

- Bosnian Premier League: 2020–21, 2023–24
