= Saša Balić =

Montenegrin footballer

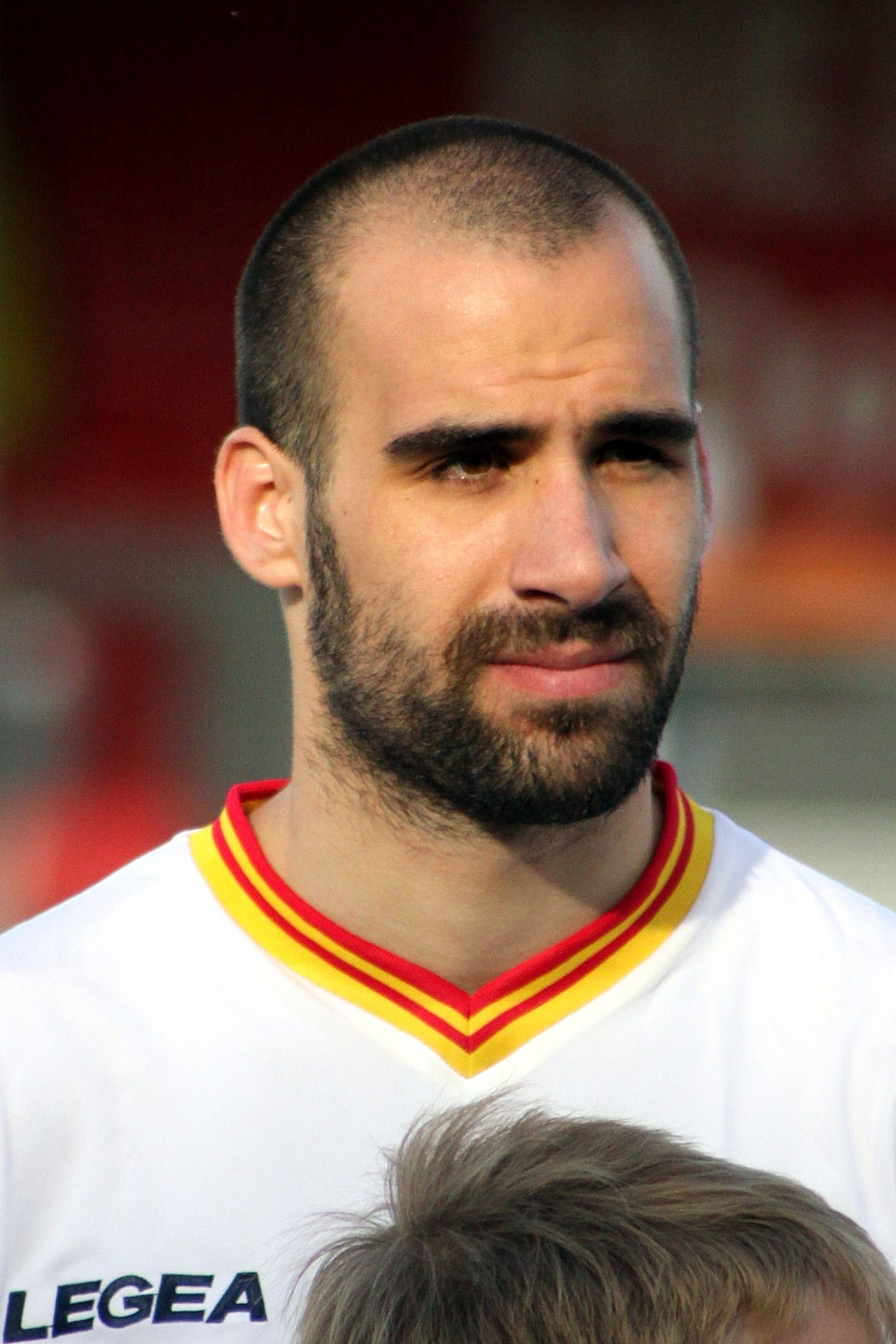

Personal information
- Date of birth: 29 January 1990 (age 36)
- Place of birth: Kotor, SR Montenegro, SFR Yugoslavia
- Height: 1.85 m (6 ft 1 in)
- Position: Left-back

Youth career
- 2006–2007: Bokelj
- 2007–2008: OFK Beograd
- 2008–2009: Grbalj

Senior career*
Years	Team	Apps	(Gls)
2007–2008	OFK Beograd	1	(0)
2008–2009	Grbalj	9	(0)
2010–2012	Inter Zaprešić	48	(3)
2012–2013	Kryvbas Kryvyi Rih	14	(0)
2013–2015	Metalurh Zaporizhya	36	(0)
2015–2016	Târgu Mureș	24	(1)
2016–2017	Sarajevo	19	(1)
2017	CFR Cluj	0	(0)
2017–2022	Zagłębie Lubin	130	(6)
2018	Zagłębie Lubin II	2	(1)
2022–2023	Korona Kielce	11	(0)
2023	Dinamo Batumi	27	(0)
2024	Dečić	9	(1)
2025	Bokelj	15	(0)
Total		345	(13)

International career
- Montenegro U19
- Montenegro U21
2011–	Montenegro	14	(0)
- * Club domestic league appearances and goals

Saša Balić (Serbian Cyrillic: Саша Балић; born 29 January 1990) is a former Montenegrin professional footballer who played as a defender. He played for the Montenegro national team.

== Club career ==
Balić started his career at FK Bokelj before moving to the Serbian side OFK Beograd where he spent the 2007–08 season before moving to FK Grbalj in July 2008. After spending a season with Grbalj, he was released in June 2009 and later joined Croatian side NK Inter Zaprešić in November 2009, although his transfer will come into effect during the winter transfer period so he will be eligible to play for Inter after the winter break of the 2009–10 season.

In late February 2012 Balić signed a four-year contract with FC Kryvbas Kryvyi Rih.

On 27 July 2017, he signed a contract with Zagłębie Lubin. On 25 May 2022, after five years at the club, which included Balić serving as the team's captain in 2021, it was announced he would leave Zagłębie at the end of June 2022.

On 21 June 2022, Balić joined newly promoted Ekstraklasa club Korona Kielce, signing a one-year contract. He left the club by mutual consent on 1 March 2023.

== International career ==
He made his debut for Montenegro in a March 2011 friendly match against Uzbekistan and has earned a total of 13 caps, scoring no goals.

== Career statistics ==
=== Club ===
As of match played 6 December 2023

Club	Season	League			Cup		Continental		Other		Total	
Club	Season	Division	Apps	Goals	Apps	Goals	Apps	Goals	Apps	Goals	Apps	Goals
OFK Beograd	2007–08	Serbian SuperLiga	1	0	0	0	–		–		1	0
Grbalj	2008–09	Montenegrin First League	9	0	0	0	–		–		9	0
Inter Zaprešić	2009–10	Prva HNL	11	1	0	0	–		–		11	1
Inter Zaprešić	2010–11	Prva HNL	22	2	2	0	–		–		24	2
Inter Zaprešić	2011–12	Prva HNL	14	0	2	0	–		–		16	0
Inter Zaprešić	Total		47	3	4	0	0	0	0	0	51	3
Kryvbas Kryvyi Rih	2011–12	Ukrainian Premier League	5	0	0	0	–		–		5	0
Kryvbas Kryvyi Rih	2012–13	Ukrainian Premier League	9	0	0	0	–		–		9	0
Kryvbas Kryvyi Rih	Total		14	0	0	0	0	0	0	0	14	0
Metalurh Zaporizhya	2013–14	Ukrainian Premier League	13	0	1	0	–		–		14	0
Metalurh Zaporizhya	2014–15	Ukrainian Premier League	20	0	2	0	–		–		22	0
Metalurh Zaporizhya	Total		33	0	3	0	0	0	0	0	36	0
Târgu Mureș	2015–16	Liga I	19	0	3	1	2 (Note: Appearances in UEFA Europa League)	0	0	0	24	1
FK Sarajevo	2016–17	Bosnian Premier League	15	1	4	0	–		–		19	1
CFR Cluj	2017–18	Liga I	0	0	0	0	–		–		0	0
Zagłębie Lubin	2017–18	Ekstraklasa	25	1	3	0	–		–		28	1
Zagłębie Lubin	2018–19	Ekstraklasa	29	1	1	0	–		–		30	1
Zagłębie Lubin	2019–20	Ekstraklasa	31	2	2	0	–		–		33	2
Zagłębie Lubin	2020–21	Ekstraklasa	25	2	2	0	–		–		27	2
Zagłębie Lubin	2021–22	Ekstraklasa	20	0	1	0	–		–		21	0
Zagłębie Lubin	Total		130	6	9	0	0	0	0	0	139	6
Zagłębie Lubin II	2017–18	III Liga	1	0	–		–		–		1	0
Zagłębie Lubin II	2018–19	III Liga	1	1	–		–		–		1	1
Zagłębie Lubin II	Total		2	1	0	0	0	0	0	0	2	1
Korona Kielce	2022–23	Ekstraklasa	11	0	2	0	–		–		13	0
Dinamo Batumi	2023	Erovnuli Liga	27	0	2	0	2 (Note: Appearances in UEFA Europa Conference League)	0	2 (Note: Appearances in Georgian Super Cup)	0	31	0
Career total			308	11	27	1	4	0	2	0	341	12

=== International ===
As of match played 26 September 2022

National team	Year	Apps	Goals
Montenegro
Montenegro	2011	3	0
Montenegro	2012	1	0
Montenegro	2014	5	0
Montenegro	2015	3	0
Montenegro	2020	1	0
Montenegro	2022	1	0
Total		14	0
