= Rijad Sadiku =

Bosnian footballer

Personal information
- Date of birth: 18 January 2000 (age 26)
- Place of birth: Sarajevo, Bosnia and Herzegovina
- Height: 1.87 m (6 ft 2 in)
- Position: Centre-back

Team information
- Current team: Botoșani
- Number: 44

Youth career
- 2007–2013: Novi Grad Sarajevo
- 2013–2018: Sarajevo

Senior career*
Years	Team	Apps	(Gls)
2017–2018	Sarajevo	0	(0)
2018–2020	Mouscron	3	(0)
2020	Mladost Doboj Kakanj	3	(0)
2020–2021	Zrinjski Mostar	2	(0)
2021	Mladost Doboj Kakanj	10	(0)
2021–2022	Rudar Prijedor	29	(0)
2022–	Botoșani	61	(2)

International career
2015	Bosnia and Herzegovina U15	2	(0)
2015–2016	Bosnia and Herzegovina U16	4	(0)
2015–2017	Bosnia and Herzegovina U17	26	(0)
2017	Bosnia and Herzegovina U19	7	(0)
2019–2020	Bosnia and Herzegovina U21	2	(0)
- * Club domestic league appearances and goals as of 1 November 2026

Rijad Sadiku (Bosnian pronunciation: [rǐjaːd sǎdiku]; born 18 January 2000) is a Bosnian professional footballer who plays as a centre-back for Liga I club Botoșani.

== Club career ==
=== Sarajevo ===
Sadiku is a product of Sarajevo's youth academy. On 28 May 2017, he was named as a Sarajevo substitute for the first time in a Bosnian Premier League match against Krupa, but was an unused substitute in that match.

=== Mouscron ===
On 30 January 2018, Sadiku joined Belgian First Division A side Mouscron after agreeing to a four-year deal. On 5 May 2019, he made his debut as a professional footballer in a 3–0 home win against Zulte Waregem after being named in the starting line-up.

=== Mladost Doboj Kakanj ===
On 21 January 2020, Sadiku joined Mladost Doboj Kakanj after agreeing to a one-and-a-half-year deal. Two days later, he made his debut in a 0–0 away draw against Sloboda Tuzla after being named in the starting line-up.

=== Zrinjski Mostar ===
On 5 August 2020, Sadiku left Mladot Doboj Kakanj and joined Zrinjski Mostar, signing a three-year contract. He made his official debut for Zrinjski on 12 September 2020, in a league match against his former club Mladost Doboj Kakanj. Sadiku terminated his contract and left the club on 26 January 2021.

=== Return to Mladost Doboj Kakanj ===
In February 2021, Sadiku returned to Mladot Doboj Kakanj. He left the club only four months later in June.

== International career ==
Sadiku represented Bosnia and Herzegovina on all youth levels, he also served as captain of the national under-17 team and is the most capped player in the history of the national under-17 team with 26 caps.

== Personal life ==
Sadiku was born in Sarajevo, Bosnia and Herzegovina, to Kosovan parents from the village Radeše of Dragaš.

== Career statistics ==
As of match played 1 November 2026.

Appearances and goals by club, season and competition
Club	Season	League			National cup (Note: Includes Bosnia and Herzegovina Cup, Cupa României)		Europe		Other		Total	
Club	Season	Division	Apps	Goals	Apps	Goals	Apps	Goals	Apps	Goals	Apps	Goals
Sarajevo	2017–18	Bosnian Premier League	0	0	0	0	—		—		0	0
Mouscron	2017–18	Belgian First Division A	0	0	0	0	—		—		0	0
Mouscron	2018–19	Belgian First Division A	3	0	0	0	—		—		3	0
Mouscron	2019–20	Belgian First Division A	0	0	0	0	—		—		0	0
Mouscron	Total		3	0	0	0	—		—		3	0
Mladost Doboj Kakanj	2019–20	Bosnian Premier League	3	0	0	0	—		—		3	0
Zrinjski Mostar	2020–21	Bosnian Premier League	2	0	2	0	1 (Note: Appearance in UEFA Europa League)	0	—		5	0
Mladost Doboj Kakanj	2020–21	Bosnian Premier League	10	0	—		—		—		10	0
Rudar Prijedor	2021–22	Bosnian Premier League	29	0	0	0	—		—		29	0
Botoșani	2022–23	Liga I	19	0	1	0	—		0	0	20	0
Botoșani	2023–24	Liga I	18	1	1	0	—		0	0	19	1
Botoșani	2024–25	Liga I	21	1	3	0	—		—		24	1
Botoșani	2025–26	Liga I	0	0	0	0	—		0	0	0	0
Botoșani	2026–27	Liga I	3	0	3	0	—		—		6	0
Botoșani	Total		61	2	8	0	—		0	0	69	2
Career total			108	2	10	0	1	0	0	0	119	2
