= Amer Bekić =

Bosnian footballer

Personal information
- Date of birth: 5 August 1992 (age 34)
- Place of birth: Tuzla, Bosnia and Herzegovina
- Height: 1.86 m (6 ft 1 in)
- Position: Centre-forward

Team information
- Current team: Unis Vogošća
- Number: 7

Youth career
- –2010: Sloboda Tuzla

Senior career*
Years	Team	Apps	(Gls)
2010–2011	Sloboda Tuzla	30	(3)
2011–2014	Zrinjski Mostar	67	(19)
2014–2017	Sarajevo	63	(14)
2017–2018	Tobol	4	(0)
2018	Sloboda Tuzla	10	(3)
2018–2019	Zrinjski Mostar	14	(0)
2019–2020	Sloboda Tuzla	12	(7)
2021–2022	Borneo Samarinda	0	(0)
2021–2022	Opatija	8	(0)
2022–2023	Sloboda Tuzla	16	(2)
2025–2026	Radnik Hadžići	20	(3)
2026–	Unis Vogošća	0	(0)

International career
2010	Bosnia and Herzegovina U19	4	(0)
2011–2013	Bosnia and Herzegovina U21	8	(0)
- * Club domestic league appearances and goals as of 2 July 2026

Amer Bekić (born 5 August 1992) is a Bosnian professional footballer who plays as a centre-forward for Second League of FBiH club Unis Vogošća.

== Club career ==
=== Sloboda Tuzla ===
In January 2010, Bekić signed his first professional contract with Bosnian club Sloboda Tuzla. In July 2011, Bekić left the club.

=== Zrinjski Mostar ===
In July 2011, Bekić signed a contract with Bosnian club Zrinjski Mostar. With Zrinjski, Bekić won his first trophy in his senior career. He would left the club at the end of 2013–14 season.

=== Sarajevo ===
In August 2014, Bekić signed a three-year deal with Bosnian club Sarajevo. Bekić left the club in 2017, after his contract expired.

=== Tobol ===
In July 2017, Bekić signed a contract with Kazakhstan Premier League club Tobol. He made his debut in a league match against Astana on 22 July 2017. He left the club after a half season.

=== Sloboda Tuzla ===
Bekić returned to Sloboda Tuzla in January 2018. He left the club in June 2018.

=== Zrinjski Mostar ===
Bekić returned to Zrinjski Mostar for the second time. He left the club at the end of a season.

=== Sloboda Tuzla ===
In July 2019, Bekić signed a contract with Sloboda Tuzla. He left the club in June 2020.

=== Borneo Samarinda ===
In February 2021, Bekić signed a contract with Liga 1 club Borneo Samarinda. Bekić sued Borneo to the FIFA authorities. He asked for the termination of the contract and the payment of the entire amount from the contract, and he was informed by FIFA that he is a free player and can look for a new club, while the process related to finances continues.

=== Opatija ===
In February 2022, Bekić signed a contract until the end of a season with a Croatian club Opatija. He left the club at the end of a season.

=== Sloboda Tuzla ===
In September 2022, Bekić returned for fourth time at the Sloboda Tuzla. He left the club at the end of a season.

=== Radnik Hadžići ===
After nearly two years without club, Bekić returned to play for Bosnian second division club Radnik Hadžići.

== Career statistics ==
=== Club ===
As of match played 24 May 2026

Appearances and goals by club, season and competition
Club	Season	League			National cup (Note: Includes Bosnian Cup, Piala Indonesia)		Continental		Total	
Club	Season	League	Apps	Goals	Apps	Goals	Apps	Goals	Apps	Goals
Sloboda Tuzla	2009–10	Bosnian Premier League	9	0	0	0	—		9	0
Sloboda Tuzla	2010–11	Bosnian Premier League	21	3	0	0	—		21	3
Sloboda Tuzla	Total		30	3	0	0	0	0	30	3
Zrinjski Mostar	2011–12	Bosnian Premier League	25	8	0	0	—		25	8
Zrinjski Mostar	2012–13	Bosnian Premier League	17	2	2	0	—		19	2
Zrinjski Mostar	2013–14	Bosnian Premier League	25	9	5	1	4 (Note: Appearance(s) in UEFA Europa League)	0	34	10
Zrinjski Mostar	Total		67	19	7	1	4	0	78	20
Sarajevo	2014–15	Bosnian Premier League	17	2	1	0	—		18	2
Sarajevo	2015–16	Bosnian Premier League	24	9	3	1	0	0	27	10
Sarajevo	2016–17	Bosnian Premier League	22	3	8	4	—		30	7
Sarajevo	Total		63	14	12	5	0	0	75	19
Tobol	2017	Kazakhstan Premier League	4	0	0	0	—		4	0
Sloboda Tuzla	2017–18	Bosnian Premier League	10	3	2	0	—		12	3
Zrinjski Mostar	2018–19	Bosnian Premier League	14	0	3	0	1	0	18	0
Sloboda Tuzla	2019–20	Bosnian Premier League	12	7	0	0	—		12	7
Borneo Samarinda	2020	Liga 1	0	0	1	0	—		1	0
Opatija	2021–22	Prva NL	8	0	0	0	—		8	0
Sloboda Tuzla	2022–23	Bosnian Premier League	16	2	2	4	—		18	6
Radnik Hadžići	2024–25	First League of FBiH	8	0	—		—		8	0
Radnik Hadžići	2024–25	First League of FBiH	12	3	—		—		12	3
Radnik Hadžići	Total		20	3	—		—		20	3
Career total			244	51	27	10	5	0	276	61

== Honours ==
Zrinjski Mostar

- Bosnian Premier League: 2013–14

Sarajevo

- Bosnian Premier League: 2014–15
