= Sanjin Lelić =

Bosnian-Herzegovinian footballer

Personal information
- Full name: Sanjin Lelić
- Date of birth: 11 January 1997 (age 29)
- Place of birth: Sarajevo, Bosnia and Herzegovina
- Height: 1.72 m (5 ft 7 1/2 in)
- Position: Winger

Youth career
- –2013: TSV 1860 Munich
- 2014–2015: FC Ingolstadt
- 2015–2016: Dinamo Zagreb

Senior career*
Years	Team	Apps	(Gls)
2014–2015	FC Ingolstadt II	4	(0)
2016–2017	Olimpik Sarajevo	16	(3)
2017–2019	FK Sarajevo	10	(1)
2019	→ Čelik Zenica (loan)	7	(0)
2019–2020	Roeselare	0	(0)
2020	Rudar Velenje	15	(2)

International career
2013–2014	Bosnia and Herzegovina U17	6	(1)
2015	Bosnia and Herzegovina U19	2	(0)
- * Club domestic league appearances and goals as of 28 August 2020

Sanjin Lelić (born 11 January 1997) is a Bosnian-Herzegovinian professional footballer who plays as a winger.

== Club career ==
He had a spell with Slovenian side Rudar Velenje in 2020.
