= Perica Ivetić =

Bosnian association football player

Personal information
- Full name: Perica Ivetić
- Date of birth: 28 November 1986 (age 39)
- Place of birth: Livno, SFR Yugoslavia
- Height: 1.78 m (5 ft 10 in)
- Positions: Defender; midfielder

Team information
- Current team: Rudar Prijedor
- Number: 57

Senior career*
Years	Team	Apps	(Gls)
–2008	Borac Banja Luka		
2008	Bela Krajina	5	(0)
2009	Laktaši		
2009–2010	BSK Banja Luka		
2010–2011	Velež Mostar	35	(0)
2012	Borac Banja Luka	14	(1)
2012–2013	Olimpik	26	(0)
2013–2015	Koper	43	(1)
2015–2016	Sloboda Tuzla	42	(1)
2016–2018	Sarajevo	37	(1)
2018–2020	Sloboda Tuzla	61	(0)
2020	Vinogradar	1	(0)
2020–	Rudar Prijedor	14	(2)

International career
2012–2013	Bosnia and Herzegovina U17	14	(4)
2014–2015	Bosnia and Herzegovina U19	12	(3)
2015	Bosnia and Herzegovina U21	3	(0)
- * Club domestic league appearances and goals as of 14 November 2020

Perica Ivetić (born 28 November 1986) is a Bosnian professional footballer who plays as a defender or as a midfielder for First League of RS club Rudar Prijedor.

== Career statistics ==
=== Club ===
As of match played 14 November 2020.

Club	Season	League	League		Cup		Continental		Total	
Club	Season	League	Apps	Goals	Apps	Goals	Apps	Goals	Apps	Goals
Sarajevo	2016–17	Bosnian Premier League	23	0	5	0	–		28	0
Sarajevo	2017–18	Bosnian Premier League	14	1	1	0	2	1	17	2
Sarajevo	Total		37	1	6	0	2	1	45	2
Sloboda	2017–18	Bosnian Premier League	13	0	0	0	—		13	0
Sloboda	2018–19	Bosnian Premier League	31	0	0	0	—		31	0
Sloboda	2019–20	Bosnian Premier League	17	0	1	0	—		18	0
Sloboda	Total		61	0	1	0	—		62	0
Vinogradar	2019–20	3. HNL	1	0	—		—		1	0
Rudar Prijedor	2020–21	First League of RS	14	2	1	0	—		15	2
Career total			113	3	8	0	2	1	123	4
