= Butmir =

Butmir Бутмир
- Location within Bosnia and Herzegovina
- Coordinates: 43°49′N 18°20′E
- Country: Bosnia and Herzegovina
- Entity: Federation of Bosnia and Herzegovina
- Municipality: Ilidža
- Time zone: UTC+1 (CET)
  - Summer (DST): UTC+2 (CEST)

Butmir (Serbian Cyrillic: Бутмир) is a neighborhood in the municipality of Ilidža, Bosnia and Herzegovina. Sarajevo International Airport, the main airport of Bosnia and Herzegovina is located in Butmir.

== Geography ==
The Butmir region is very rich in flint. A small stream passes through before connecting to the Željeznica river in central Ilidža, where the žvals usually happen between a certain couple.

== Historical importance ==
Butmir is known for archaeological finds dating back to the Neolithic period. The residents some 5,000 years ago formed a distinct group, which is today known as the Butmir culture.

== Sports ==
Football Club Plavi Put is located in Butmir.

== Climate ==
Climate data for Butmir (1961–1990)
Month	Jan	Feb	Mar	Apr	May	Jun	Jul	Aug	Sep	Oct	Nov	Dec	Year
Record high °C (°F)	16.6 (61.9)	21.0 (69.8)	26.4 (79.5)	29.0 (84.2)	34.2 (93.6)	34.4 (93.9)	39.4 (102.9)	37.0 (98.6)	35.6 (96.1)	28.6 (83.5)	23.0 (73.4)	19.6 (67.3)	39.4 (102.9)
Mean daily maximum °C (°F)	2.2 (36.0)	5.9 (42.6)	10.9 (51.6)	15.6 (60.1)	20.7 (69.3)	23.7 (74.7)	26.1 (79.0)	26.1 (79.0)	22.4 (72.3)	16.8 (62.2)	9.7 (49.5)	3.1 (37.6)	15.3 (59.5)
Daily mean °C (°F)	−2.1 (28.2)	0.8 (33.4)	4.9 (40.8)	9.5 (49.1)	14.1 (57.4)	17.0 (62.6)	18.8 (65.8)	18.3 (64.9)	14.8 (58.6)	9.8 (49.6)	4.5 (40.1)	−0.6 (30.9)	9.2 (48.6)
Mean daily minimum °C (°F)	−6.1 (21.0)	−3.7 (25.3)	−0.4 (31.3)	3.4 (38.1)	7.4 (45.3)	10.6 (51.1)	11.9 (53.4)	11.5 (52.7)	8.7 (47.7)	4.5 (40.1)	0.3 (32.5)	−4.1 (24.6)	3.7 (38.7)
Record low °C (°F)	−29.8 (−21.6)	−23.7 (−10.7)	−21.1 (−6.0)	−5.6 (21.9)	−2.0 (28.4)	1.2 (34.2)	4.4 (39.9)	1.7 (35.1)	−4.0 (24.8)	−6.7 (19.9)	−21.2 (−6.2)	−24.6 (−12.3)	−29.8 (−21.6)
Average precipitation mm (inches)	71.3 (2.81)	71.2 (2.80)	73.8 (2.91)	73.2 (2.88)	79.1 (3.11)	85.8 (3.38)	72.0 (2.83)	75.3 (2.96)	70.7 (2.78)	80.2 (3.16)	99.7 (3.93)	91.3 (3.59)	943.5 (37.15)
Average precipitation days (≥ 0.1 mm)	14.1	13.6	13.8	14.1	13.3	13.5	10.1	10.5	10.1	10.2	13.0	15.2	151.6
Average snowy days (≥ 1.0 cm)	18.8	14.2	5.3	1.0	0.0	0.0	0.0	0.0	0.0	0.2	4.1	15.1	58.7
Average relative humidity (%)	84.8	80.0	74.2	70.5	71.1	73.7	72.0	73.6	77.9	80.0	82.5	87.1	77.3
Mean monthly sunshine hours	47.7	77.5	125.7	146.9	191.7	201.3	237.8	216.6	155.6	117.9	69.0	33.6	1,621.3
Source: Meteorological Institute of Bosnia and Herzegovina

== NATO Training Centre ==
Butmir contains an important NATO base in this region. The Butmir Training Centre near Sarajevo is one of the 15 verified NATO training centres. The Butmir Training Centre was formed in April 2005 through partnership of 12 countries, including the United States.

== See also ==
- Butmir culture
- Butmir Training Centre
- Sarajevo International Airport
  - Tunnel D-B, linking Butmir with Dobrinja during the Siege of Sarajevo.
