= Edin Rustemović =

Bosnian professional footballer (born 1993)

Personal information
- Date of birth: 6 January 1993 (age 33)
- Place of birth: Wiesbaden, Germany
- Height: 1.80 m (5 ft 11 in)
- Position: Midfielder

Team information
- Current team: Slavija
- Number: 44

Youth career
- Drina Zvornik

Senior career*
Years	Team	Apps	(Gls)
2010–2012	Drina Zvornik	8	(0)
2013–2014	OFK Beograd	2	(0)
2013	→ Sinđelić Beograd (loan)	9	(0)
2014	Drina Zvornik	15	(4)
2015–2017	Sarajevo	60	(1)
2017	Adana Demirspor	2	(0)
2018	Sloboda Tuzla	12	(1)
2018–2020	Zrinjski Mostar	40	(5)
2020–2021	Tuzla City	17	(1)
2021–2022	Shakhter Karagandy	32	(1)
2022–2023	Radnik Surdulica	22	(1)
2023	Željezničar	11	(0)
2024	Radnik Surdulica	11	(0)
2025–	Slavija	38	(5)
- * Club domestic league appearances and goals as of 2 December 2023

Edin Rustemović (born 6 January 1993) is a Bosnian professional footballer who plays as a midfielder.

== Club career ==
Rustemović started his career at Drina Zvornik where in January 2012 he got awarded among the 10 best sports people from the town of Zvornik for the year 2011. He made his debut in the 2010–11 Bosnian Premier League season with Drina.

In summer 2012, Rustemović came on trials at Vojvodina, but in a friendly game against Copenhagen he broke his leg in an injury. He subsequently joined OFK Beograd in February 2013.

=== OFK Beograd ===
After almost a year without playing professional football from his injury with Vojvodina, Rustemović made his debut for OFK Beograd in a 3–1 loss against Jagodina. In summer 2013, he was loaned to Serbian First League promoted side Sinđelić Beograd.

== Honours ==
Sarajevo

- Bosnian Premier League: 2014–15
