= Almir Bekić =

Bosnian footballer (born 1989)

Personal information
- Date of birth: 1 June 1989 (age 37)
- Place of birth: Tuzla, SFR Yugoslavia
- Height: 1.81 m (5 ft 11 1/2 in)
- Position: Left back

Team information
- Current team: Radnik Hadžići

Senior career*
Years	Team	Apps	(Gls)
2007–2010	Sloboda Tuzla	34	(2)
2010–2014	Dinamo Zagreb	0	(0)
2010	→ Lokomotiva (loan)	10	(0)
2011	→ Sloboda Tuzla (loan)	12	(2)
2012	→ Sloboda Tuzla (loan)	13	(3)
2012–2013	→ GOŠK Gabela (loan)	21	(5)
2013–2014	→ Sesvete (loan)	27	(1)
2015	Sloboda Tuzla	13	(1)
2015–2019	Sarajevo	79	(1)
2019–2020	Sloboda Tuzla	18	(0)
2020–2023	Zrinjski Mostar	63	(1)
2024	Rudar Prijedor	12	(1)
2024–2025	Igman Konjic	6	(0)
2025–	Radnik Hadžići	0	(0)

International career^{‡}
2009–2010	Bosnia and Herzegovina U21	4	(0)
2016–2018	Bosnia and Herzegovina	3	(0)
- * Club domestic league appearances and goals as of 23 August 2024 ‡ National team caps and goals as of 1 February 2018

Almir Bekić (born 1 June 1989) is a Bosnian professional footballer who plays for First League of FBiH club Radnik Hadžići.

== Club career ==
A product of the Sloboda Tuzla academy, Bekić had his professional debut on 14 November 2007 playing 20 minutes in a Bosnian Premier League match against Velež Mostar. However, Bekić spent the following couple of years mainly playing at youth level before finally establishing himself as a first-team regular in the 2009–10 season, in which he appeared in 24 league matches and scored 1 goal for the Bosnian side.

In July 2010, Bekić was picked up by Croatian powerhouse Dinamo Zagreb for a €100.000 transfer fee.

At half-season in 2012, Bekić returned to Sloboda Tuzla, where he scored 3 goals. But after Sloboda got relegated to the First League of FBiH, Dinamo sent Bekić on a loan to GOŠK Gabela. His first games were solid, but in the spring part of the season he played even better, becoming of the best players of GOŠK. He scored 4 goals and added 5 assist.

== International career ==
Bekić was capped for the Bosnia and Herzegovina U21 national team and made his senior debut for Bosnia and Herzegovina in a June 2016 friendly match away against Japan and has earned a total of 3 caps, scoring no goals. His final international was a January 2018 friendly against Mexico.

== Career statistics ==
=== Club ===
As of 12 February 2025

Appearances and goals by club, season and competition
Club	Season	League			Cup		Continental		Total	
Club	Season	Division	Apps	Goals	Apps	Goals	Apps	Goals	Apps	Goals
Sloboda Tuzla	2008–09	Bosnian Premier League	10	1	0	0	–		10	1
Sloboda Tuzla	2009–10	Bosnian Premier League	25	1	0	0	–		25	1
Sloboda Tuzla	Total		35	2	0	0	0	0	35	2
Lokomotiva (loan)	2010–11	1. HNL	10	0	1	0	–		11	0
Sloboda Tuzla (loan)	2010–11	Bosnian Premier League	12	2			–		12	2
Sloboda Tuzla (loan)	2011–12	Bosnian Premier League	13	3			–		13	3
GOŠK (loan)	2012–13	Bosnian Premier League	21	5	2	1	–		23	6
Sesvete (loan)	2013–14	2. HNL	27	1	0	0	–		27	1
Sloboda Tuzla	2014–15	Bosnian Premier League	13	1	0	0	–		13	1
Sarajevo	2015–16	Bosnian Premier League	20	0	3	0	2	0	25	0
Sarajevo	2016–17	Bosnian Premier League	26	0	7	1	–		33	1
Sarajevo	2017–18	Bosnian Premier League	24	1	1	0	2	0	27	1
Sarajevo	2018–19	Bosnian Premier League	10	0	5	0	0	0	15	0
Sarajevo	Total		80	1	16	1	4	0	100	2
Sloboda Tuzla	2019–20	Bosnian Premier League	18	0	0	0	–		18	0
Zrinjski Mostar	2020–21	Bosnian Premier League	27	0	3	0	1	0	31	0
Zrinjski Mostar	2021–22	Bosnian Premier League	16	0	0	0	0	0	16	0
Zrinjski Mostar	2022–23	Bosnian Premier League	20	1	1	0	2	0	23	1
Zrinjski Mostar	Total		63	1	4	0	3	0	70	1
Rudar Prijedor	2023–24	First League of RS	12	1	0	0	–		12	1
Igman Konjic	2024–25	Bosnian Premier League	6	0	1	0	–		7	0
Radnik Hadžići	2024–25	First League of FBiH	0	0	0	0	–		0	0
Career total			310	17	24	2	7	0	341	19

=== International ===
As of match played 31 January 2018

Appearances and goals by national team and year
National team	Year	Apps	Goals
Bosnia and Herzegovina	2016	1	0
Bosnia and Herzegovina	2017	0	0
Bosnia and Herzegovina	2018	2	0
Total		3	0

== Honours ==
Sarajevo

- Bosnian Premier League: 2018–19
- Bosnian Cup: 2018–19

Zrinjski Mostar

- Bosnian Premier League: 2021–22, 2022–23
- Bosnian Cup: 2022–23
