= Elvedin Herić =

Bosnian footballer

Personal information
- Date of birth: 9 February 1997 (age 29)
- Place of birth: Augsburg, Germany
- Height: 1.78 m (5 ft 10 in)
- Position: Midfielder

Team information
- Current team: Igman Konjic
- Number: 8

Youth career
- Sloboda Tuzla
- 2014–2017: Sarajevo

Senior career*
Years	Team	Apps	(Gls)
2015–2018	Sarajevo	17	(0)
2018–2019	Kapfenberger SV	24	(2)
2019	Triglav Kranj	7	(0)
2020	Sloboda Tuzla	8	(0)
2020–2021	Kapfenberger SV	26	(3)
2021–2023	Vllaznia Shkodër	49	(1)
2023–2024	Gjilani	31	(4)
2024–	Igman Konjic	24	(3)

International career
2015	Bosnia and Herzegovina U19	3	(0)
- * Club domestic league appearances and goals as of 1 June 2025

Elvedin Herić (born 9 February 1997) is a Bosnian professional footballer who plays as a midfielder for Bosnian Premier League club Igman Konjic.

== Club career ==
On 11 August 2021, he joined Vllaznia in Albania.
