= Emir Plakalo =

Bosnian footballer

Personal information
- Date of birth: 19 February 1995 (age 31)
- Place of birth: Bosnia and Herzegovina
- Height: 1.86 m (6 ft 1 in)
- Position: Goalkeeper

Team information
- Current team: Lunds BK
- Number: 1

Youth career
- Sarajevo

Senior career*
Years	Team	Apps	(Gls)
2012–2017	Sarajevo	8	(0)
2016	→ Metalleghe (loan)		
2017	FC Rosengård 1917	6	(0)
2018	Eskilsminne IF	23	(0)
2019	Aiginiakos	1	(0)
2019	Åtvidaberg	10	(0)
2020	Linköping City	13	(0)
2021–	Lunds BK	36	(0)
- * Club domestic league appearances and goals as of 19:15, 1 June 2022 (UTC)

Emir Plakalo (born 19 February 1995) is a Bosnian professional footballer who plays as a goalkeeper for Swedish club Lunds BK.

== Club career ==
Plakalo started his career with FK Sarajevo, where he made eight league appearances. In January 2019 he signed for Greek outfit Aiginiakos after a first spell in Sweden.
