= Butmir Training Centre =

Sports camp in Bosnia and Hezegovina

- Butmir Training Centre location in Ilidža, near Sarajevo
- Interactive map of Butmir Training Centre
- Full name: Trening centar Fudbalskog kluba Sarajevo-Butmir; Тренинг центар Фудбалског клуба Сарајево-Бутмир
- Address: Kemala Kapetanovića 12, 71000 Butmir
- Location: Butmir, Sarajevo Canton, Bosnia & Herzegovina
- Coordinates: 43.81422186855281°N 18.335588876420847°E
- Owner: FK Sarajevo
- Type: Football training ground

Construction
- Opened: 24 October 2015
- Cost: 5 million euros (2015)

Tenants
- FK Sarajevo, FK Sarajevo Academy, The Asim Ferhatović Hase School of Football

Website
- Official website

The Football Club Sarajevo - Butmir Training Centre (Bosnian: Trening centar Fudbalskog kluba Sarajevo - Butmir; Cyrillic: Тренинг центар Фудбалског клуба Сарајево - Бутмир) is a compound consisting a number of sport facilities, serving as a training ground for FK Sarajevo. The camp is located in the neighbourhood of Butmir, which is part of the Ilidža municipality in the Sarajevo Canton, Bosnia and Herzegovina, and was officially opened on 24 October 2015, after the first stage of construction was completed. The centre is currently undergoing expansion, with the third of three construction phases underway.

== History ==
When Vincent Tan purchased management rights for FK Sarajevo in late 2013, the lack of club owned training facilities was identified as a large obstacle to club aspirations and independency. FK Sarajevo had traditionally used the component facilities of the municipality owned Asim Ferhatović Hase Stadium which were considered outdated and did not allow for full organizational and financial independence. This fact led the club management headed by Tan and the Berjaya Group in search of a location for the construction of new and modern facilities. The neighbourhood of Butmir was eventually chosen because of its close proximity to the Sarajevo International Airport, the suburb of Ilidža and because of the already existing training grounds used by a private football academy run by former FK Sarajevo captain Predrag Pašić. The 17 acre (70,000 square meter) land plot was jointly owned by the Ilidža municipality and a local agricultural co-op, but after negotiations the club purchased the land and began preparing the large construction project. On 24 December 2014 the club signed an agreement with construction contractors for the first phase of construction to begin in July of the same year. The first phase of construction, costing allegedly 8 million KM, was completed in August 2015. On 14 December 2015 the facilities were granted a FIFA PRO licence.

== Facilities ==
The training centre holds an entrance gate leading to a large plaza, water fountain, botanical gardens, bus terminus and parking lot. The main artificial turf pitch is named after club legend Želimir Vidović, who was killed during the Siege of Sarajevo while transporting wounded citizens to a nearby hospital. A statue of Vidović was erected on the western grass knoll that encompasses the turf. Other on-site amenities include modern changing rooms, offices, a cafeteria, a gym, and a smaller auxiliary building; phases of development have also introduced fitness and recovery facilities following significant investment under the leadership of Ismir Mirvić.

== Other usage ==
Apart from the first team, the centre is home to the FK Sarajevo Academy which trains and plays home fixtures in the facility. With the completion of the project, the centre will also include a boarding facility for the academy members, consisting of the aforementioned bungalows. Furthermore, the centre hosts the women's team which trains and plays friendly fixtures on the facility pitches. The training camp is occasionally used by the Bosnia and Herzegovina national team. The club employs war veterans from the Ilidža municipality in the training centre as a way of giving back to the community.
