= Saša Novaković =

Croatian footballer

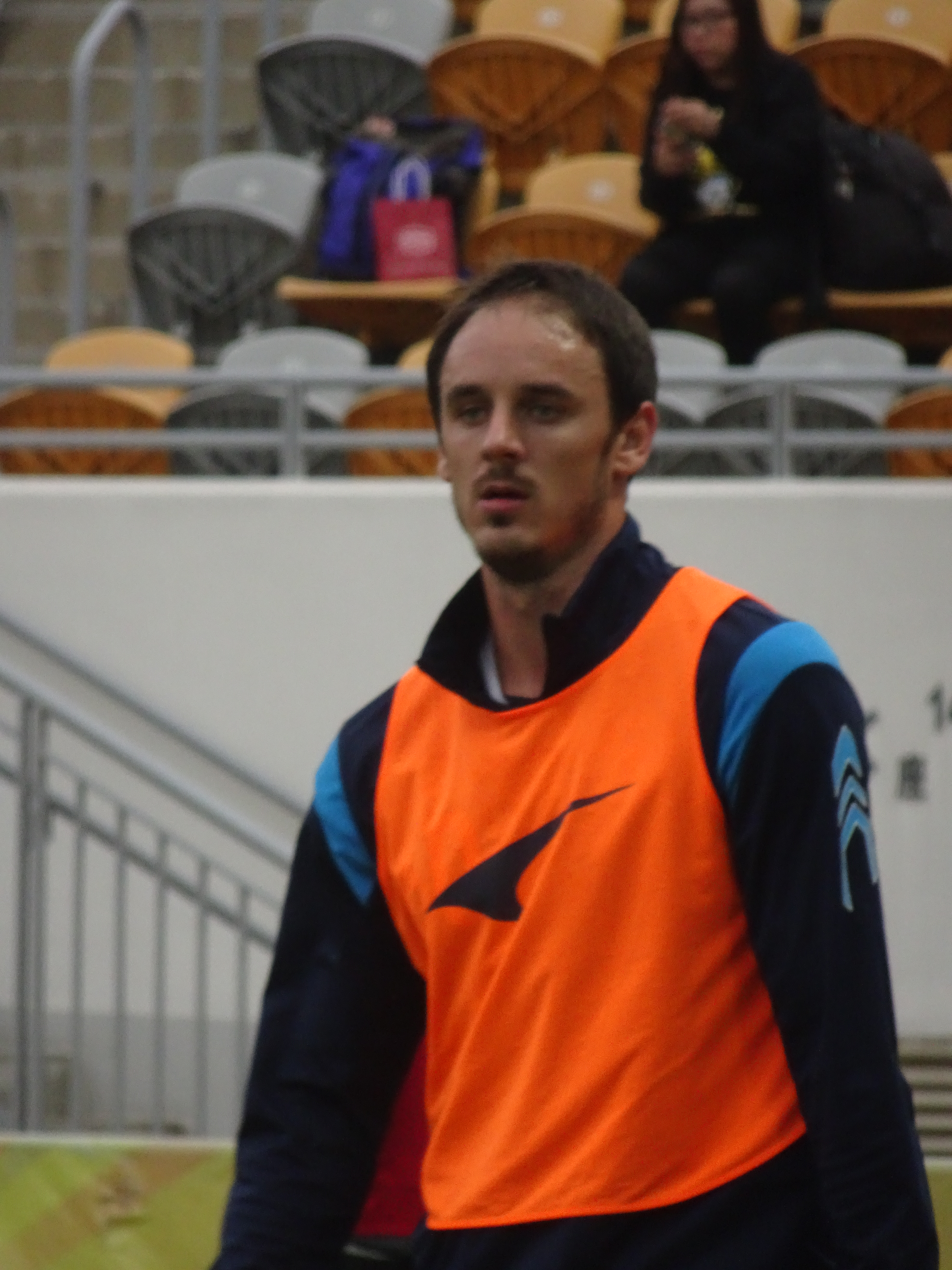
- Novaković in December 2018 with R&F

Personal information
- Date of birth: 27 May 1991 (age 35)
- Place of birth: Osijek, SFR Yugoslavia
- Height: 1.91 m (6 ft 3 in)
- Positions: Centre-back; defensive midfielder

Youth career
- –2010: Osijek

Senior career*
Years	Team	Apps	(Gls)
2010–2015	Osijek	59	(4)
2010–2011	→ Vukovar '91 (loan)	11	(0)
2011	→ Crikvenica (loan)	14	(0)
2015	→ Brașov (loan)	16	(1)
2015–2016	Voluntari	24	(1)
2016–2018	Sarajevo	43	(2)
2018–2019	R&F	11	(3)
2020–2021	Radnik Bijeljina	24	(1)
- * Club domestic league appearances and goals as of 2 April 2021

Saša Novaković (born 27 May 1991) is a Croatian professional footballer who most recently played for Bosnian Premier League club Radnik Bijeljina.
