= 2018–19 FK Sarajevo season =

Sarajevo
2018–19 season
- President: Valentin Ilievski
- Chairman: Senad Jahić
- Manager: Husref Musemić
- Stadium: Asim Ferhatović Hase Stadium
- Premier League BiH: Winners
- Cup of BiH: Winners
- UEFA Europa League: Second qualifying round
- Top goalscorer: League: Mersudin Ahmetović (14); All: Mersudin Ahmetović (16)
- Highest home attendance: 23,820 vs Atalanta (2 August 2018)
- Lowest home attendance: 1,000 vs Sloga Gornje Crnjelovo (10 April 2019)
- Average home league attendance: 5,225
- Biggest win: Mladost 0–6 Sarajevo (6 October 2018)
- Biggest defeat: Sarajevo 0–8 Atalanta (2 August 2018)
Home colours	Away colours	Third colours

The 2018–2019 season was Sarajevo's 70th season in existence, and their 25th consecutive season in the top flight of Bosnian football, the Premier League of BiH. Besides competing in the Premier League, the team competed in the National Cup and the qualifications for UEFA Europa League. The season covers the period from 25 June 2018 to 24 June 2019.

In that season Sarajevo won the doubles title, winning both the league and the cup. The club qualified to the 2019–20 UEFA Champions League qualifying rounds as well. The season was also manager Husref Musemić's third at the club.

== Squad information ==
=== First-team squad ===
As of 24 May 2019

Note: Flags indicate national team as defined under FIFA eligibility rules; some limited exceptions apply. Players may hold more than one non-FIFA nationality.

No.	Pos.	Nation	Player
3	DF	BIH	Selmir Pidro
4	DF	BIH	Halid Šabanović
5	MF	SRB	Miloš Stanojević
6	DF	SRB	Darko Lazić
7	MF	BIH	Anel Hebibović
8	MF	BIH	Ševkija Resić
9	FW	BIH	Mersudin Ahmetović (vice-captain)
10	MF	BIH	Amar Rahmanović
11	FW	MKD	Krste Velkoski (captain)
13	GK	BIH	Vladan Kovačević
14	MF	BIH	Rifet Kapić (on loan from Grasshopper)
16	GK	SVN	Elvis Džafić
17	MF	BIH	Aladin Šišić

No.	Pos.	Nation	Player
18	DF	BIH	Nihad Mujakić (on loan from Kortrijk)
19	DF	BIH	Almir Bekić
21	MF	CRO	Ljuban Crepulja
22	DF	MNE	Aleksandar Šofranac
23	MF	BIH	Alen Mustafić
25	DF	GHA	Joachim Adukor
26	MF	BIH	Emir Halilović
27	MF	BIH	Numan Kurdić
28	FW	BIH	Haris Handžić
29	DF	BIH	Amer Dupovac (3rd captain)
32	FW	BIH	Benjamin Tatar
37	FW	BRA	Nathan
39	FW	CRO	Mario Crnički

=== Youth academy players ===
FK Sarajevo Academy players that received a first-team squad call-up.

No.	Pos.	Nation	Player
2	DF	BIH	Armin Imamović
15	FW	BIH	Kenan Dervišagić
20	MF	BIH	Đani Salčin
24	DF	BIH	Andrej Đokanović

No.	Pos.	Nation	Player
25	MF	BIH	Amar Sabljica
30	MF	BIH	Haris Konjalić
31	FW	BIH	Ahmed Hasanović
35	GK	BIH	Belmin Dizdarević

== Transfers ==
=== In ===
Date	Pos.	Player	From	Fee	Ref.
14 June 2018	MF	(Bosnia and Herzegovina) Aladin Šišić	(Bosnia and Herzegovina) Mladost Doboj Kakanj	Free transfer	
18 June 2018	FW	(Bosnia and Herzegovina) Benjamin Tatar	(Croatia) Slaven Belupo	Free transfer	
22 June 2018	DF	(Bosnia and Herzegovina) Amer Dupovac	(Serbia) Borac Čačak	Free transfer	
3 July 2018	FW	(Bosnia and Herzegovina) Haris Handžić	(Bosnia and Herzegovina) Zrinjski	Free transfer	
17 August 2018	GK	(Slovenia) Elvis Džafić	(Slovenia) Triglav Kranj	Free transfer	
11 January 2019	DF	(Serbia) Darko Lazić	Free agent	Free transfer	
14 February 2019	FW	(Brazil) Nathan	(Brazil) Metropolitano	Free transfer	
28 February 2019	FW	(Croatia) Mario Crnički	(Cyprus) Olympiakos Nicosia	Free transfer	

=== Out ===
Date	Pos.	Player	To	Fee	Ref.
23 May 2018	GK	(Bosnia and Herzegovina) Adi Adilović	Retired		
8 June 2018	DF	(Croatia) Saša Novaković	R&F (Hong Kong)	End of contract	
8 June 2018	MF	(Bosnia and Herzegovina) Said Husejinović	(Bosnia and Herzegovina) Sloboda Tuzla	End of contract	
8 June 2018	FW	(North Macedonia) Marjan Altiparmakovski	(Albania) KF Laçi	End of contract	
16 June 2018	MF	(Bosnia and Herzegovina) Nemanja Anđušić	(Bosnia and Herzegovina) Mladost Doboj Kakanj	Contract termination	
1 July 2018	MF	(Bosnia and Herzegovina) Mićo Kuzmanović	(Belgium) Mouscron	End of contract	
1 July 2018	MF	(Bosnia and Herzegovina) Elvis Sarić	(South Korea) Suwon Bluewings	End of contract	
16 July 2018	MF	(Bosnia and Herzegovina) Elvedin Herić	(Austria) Kapfenberg	Contract termination	
18 December 2018	GK	(Bosnia and Herzegovina) Nedin Tucaković	Retired		
31 January 2019	DF	(Bosnia and Herzegovina) Nihad Mujakić	(Belgium) Kortrijk	€1,100,000	
6 February 2019	MF	(Bosnia and Herzegovina) Samir Radovac	(Bosnia and Herzegovina) Olimpik	End of contract	

=== Loans in ===
Start date	End date	Pos.	Player	From	Ref.
1 February 2019	End of season	DF	(Bosnia and Herzegovina) Nihad Mujakić	(Belgium) Kortrijk	
7 February 2019	End of season	MF	(Bosnia and Herzegovina) Rifet Kapić	(Switzerland) Grasshopper	

=== Loans out ===
Start date	End date	Pos.	Player	To	Ref.
18 July 2018	31 December 2018	MF	(Bosnia and Herzegovina) Zoran Blagojević	(Bosnia and Herzegovina) Bosna Visoko	
19 July 2018	31 December 2018	DF	(Bosnia and Herzegovina) Mufid Salčinović	(Bosnia and Herzegovina) Olimpik	
15 January 2019	End of season	DF	(Bosnia and Herzegovina) Dušan Hodžić	(Bosnia and Herzegovina) Čelik Zenica	
22 January 2019	31 December 2018	MF	(Bosnia and Herzegovina) Sanjin Lelić	(Bosnia and Herzegovina) Čelik Zenica	
31 January 2019	End of season	GK	(Serbia) Bojan Pavlović	(Bosnia and Herzegovina) Čelik Zenica	
4 February 2019	End of season	MF	(Bosnia and Herzegovina) Zoran Blagojević	(Bosnia and Herzegovina) Alfa Modriča	

== Kit ==
Supplier	Sponsor
(United States) Nike, Inc.	(Turkey) Turkish Airlines

== Pre-season and friendlies ==
Win Draw Loss Fixtures

25 June 2018 Friendly	Sarajevo (Bosnia and Herzegovina)	2–1	(North Macedonia) Rabotnički	Brežice, Slovenia
17:30 CEST (UTC+2)	Tatar 23'; Rahmanović 78'	Report	Petkovski 86'

28 June 2018 Friendly	Triglav Kranj (Slovenia)	1–4	(Bosnia and Herzegovina) Sarajevo	Rogatec, Slovenia
17:30 CEST (UTC+2)	Tijanić 43'	Report	Ahmetović 25'; Halilović 31'; Šišić 61'; Resić 80'

1 July 2018 Friendly	Sarajevo (Bosnia and Herzegovina)	5–1	(Serbia) Voždovac	Rogaška Slatina, Slovenia
17:30 CEST (UTC+2)	Ahmetović 31'; Halilović 38'; Rahmanović 51'; Radovac 88', 90'	Report	Adukor 58' (o.g.)

11 September 2018 Friendly	Borac Jelah (Bosnia and Herzegovina)	1–8	(Bosnia and Herzegovina) Sarajevo	Jelah
17:00 CEST (UTC+2)	Hamzić	Report	Handžić 49'; Mustafić 52', 75'; Resić 56'; Hodžić 66'; Šišić 66'	Stadium: Stadion Šibovi

17 October 2018 Friendly	Sarajevo (Bosnia and Herzegovina)	3–2	(Bosnia and Herzegovina) Olimpik	Butmir
	Hebibović 29'; Rahmanović 35'; Šišić 90'	Report	Pavlović 56'; Osmanović 71'	Stadium: Butmir Training Centre

23 October 2018 Friendly	Sarajevo (Bosnia and Herzegovina)	7–1	(Bosnia and Herzegovina) Klis Buturović Polje	Butmir
15:30 CEST (UTC+2)	Resić; Handžić; Halilović; Dervišagić; Šišić	Report	Vila	Stadium: Butmir Training Centre

20 November 2018 Friendly	Sarajevo (Bosnia and Herzegovina)	5–1	(Bosnia and Herzegovina) Igman Konjic	Butmir
14:00 CET (UTC+1)	Handžić; Tatar; Hebibović; Mustafić; Resić	Report	Goal	Stadium: Butmir Training Centre

24 January 2019 Friendly	Velež (Bosnia and Herzegovina)	3–1	(Bosnia and Herzegovina) Sarajevo	Mostar
14:00 CET (UTC+1)	Fajić 30'; Behram 41'; Zeljković 67'	Report	Rahmanović 26'	Stadium: Stadion Rođeni (training ground)

30 January 2019 Friendly	Sarajevo (Bosnia and Herzegovina)	3–1	(Bosnia and Herzegovina) Olimpik	Butmir
14:00 CET (UTC+1)	Šišić 40'; Nathan 63'; Salčin 65'	Report	Osmanović 44'	Stadium: Butmir Training Centre

2 February 2019 Friendly	Sarajevo (Bosnia and Herzegovina)	1–1	(North Macedonia) Shkupi	Antalya, Turkey
18:30 CET (UTC+1)	Rahmanović 19'; Kovačević (red card) 44'	Report	Broja 45' (pen.)

5 February 2019 Friendly	Sarajevo (Bosnia and Herzegovina)	2–1	(Serbia) Napredak Kruševac	Antalya, Turkey
15:00 CET (UTC+1)	Rahmanović 12'; Halilović 61'	Report	Alivodić 41'

9 February 2019 Friendly	Sarajevo (Bosnia and Herzegovina)	2–2	(Georgia (country)) WIT Georgia	Antalya, Turkey
15:30 CET (UTC+1)	Jahić (red card) 17'; Šišić 47'; Šofranac 51'	Report	Museliani 11'; Gudushauri 72' (pen.)
Note: The match was stopped in the 83rd minute.

11 February 2019 Friendly	Sarajevo (Bosnia and Herzegovina)	0–2	(Kazakhstan) Astana	Antalya, Turkey
15:00 CET (UTC+1)		Report	Logvinenko 30', 64'

12 February 2019 Friendly	Sarajevo (Bosnia and Herzegovina)	3–3	(Georgia (country)) Saburtalo	Antalya, Turkey
15:00 CET (UTC+1)	Handžić 15'; Šišić 54'; Resić 65'	Report	Rolović 5', 33'; 75'

16 February 2019 Friendly	Sarajevo (Bosnia and Herzegovina)	4–2	(Bosnia and Herzegovina) Rudar Kakanj	Butmir
14:00 CET (UTC+1)	Ahmetović 38'; Velskoski 44' (pen.); Šišić 51', 84'	Report	Kovač 43'; Mušija 55'	Stadium: Butmir Training Centre

6 March 2019 Friendly	Sarajevo (Bosnia and Herzegovina)	3–3	(Bosnia and Herzegovina) Olimpik	Butmir
15:00 CET (UTC+1)	Crnički 35'; Kurdić 44'; Šabanović 50'	Report	Jusufi 17'; Osmanović 60' (pen.), 75'	Stadium: Butmir Training Centre

27 March 2019 Friendly	Sarajevo (Bosnia and Herzegovina)	1–1	(Bosnia and Herzegovina) TOŠK Tešanj	Butmir
15:00 CET (UTC+1)	Adukor 83'	Report	Mujagić 16'	Stadium: Butmir Training Centre

== Competitions ==
=== Overview ===
Competition	First match	Last match	Starting round	Final position	Record							
Competition	First match	Last match	Starting round	Final position	Pld	W	D	L	GF	GA	GD	Win %
Premier League	22 July 2018	25 May 2019	Matchday 1	Winners	33	21	7	5	68	20	+48	63.64
Cup of BiH	19 September 2018	15 May 2019	First round	Winners	8	6	1	1	15	2	+13	75.00
Europa League	11 July 2018	2 August 2018	First qualifying round	Second qualifying round	4	2	1	1	7	11	−4	50.00
Total					45	29	9	7	90	33	+57	64.44

Source: Competitions

=== Premier League ===
==== League table ====
Pos	Team	Pld	W	D	L	GF	GA	GD	Pts	Qualification or relegation
1	Sarajevo (C)	33	21	7	5	68	20	+48	70	Qualification for the Champions League first qualifying round
2	Zrinjski Mostar	33	19	8	6	46	22	+24	65	Qualification for the Europa League first qualifying round (Note: Since the winners of the 2018–19 Bosnian Cup, Sarajevo, qualified for European competition based on league position, the spot awarded to the cup winners (Europa League first qualifying round) was passed to the fourth-placed team.)
3	Široki Brijeg	33	13	15	5	40	23	+17	54	Qualification for the Europa League first qualifying round
4	Željezničar	33	14	8	11	43	32	+11	50	Ineligible for 2019–20 European competitions (Note: As 4th placed Željezničar failed to get the UEFA license for the competition due to financial problems, Radnik Bijeljina was awarded the place as the next best placed team (5th place).)
5	Radnik Bijeljina	33	10	14	9	29	25	+4	44	Qualification for the Europa League first qualifying round

Source: Football Association of Bosnia and Herzegovina, Soccerway, UEFA
Rules for classification: 1) Points; 2) Goal difference; 3) Goals scored; 4) Head-to-head points; 5) Head-to-head goal difference; 6) Head-to-head away goals (only if two teams); 7) Head-to-head goals scored; 8) Goal difference; 9) Play-off. (Criteria 2 and 3 are not used to decide champion, UEFA competition qualification, or relegation)
(C) Champions

==== Results summary ====
Overall								Home						Away					
Pld	W	D	L	GF	GA	GD	Pts	W	D	L	GF	GA	GD	W	D	L	GF	GA	GD
33	21	7	5	68	20	+48	70	13	3	1	36	9	+27	8	4	4	32	11	+21

Source: sportsport.ba

==== Results by round ====
Round	1	2	3	4	5	6	7	8	9	10	11	12	13	14	15	16	17	18	19	20	21	22	23	24	25	26	27	28	29	30	31	32	33
Ground	A	H	A	H	A	H	A	A	H	A	H	H	A	H	A	H	A	H	H	A	H	A	H	H	H	H	A	H	A	H	A	H	A
Result	L	W	W	D	D	W	W	D	W	W	W	W	W	W	L	W	D	W	W	W	W	W	D	L	W	D	L	W	D	W	L	W	W
Position	8	5	2	3	4	3	1	2	2	1	1	1	1	1	1	1	1	1	1	1	1	1	1	1	1	1	1	1	1	1	1	1	1

Source: Competitions
A = Away; H = Home; W = Win; D = Draw; L = Loss

==== Matches ====
22 July 2018 1	Radnik	2–1	Sarajevo	Bijeljina
17:30 CEST (UTC+2)	Mekić 27'; Vasić (yellow card) 60'; Franić (yellow card) 83'; Đelmić 90'	Report	Šofranac (yellow card) 37'; Handžić (yellow card) 49', (goal) 69'; Stanojević (yellow card) 51'; Velkoski (yellow card) 90+1'	Stadium: Gradski stadion Attendance: 700; Referee: Goran Paradžik (Ljubuški)

29 July 2018 2	Sarajevo	4–0	Mladost Doboj Kakanj	Sarajevo
18:30 CEST (UTC+2)	Tatar 22', 38'; Rahmanović (yellow card) 34'; Resić 78'; Kurdić (yellow card) 85'; Handžić 90+2'	Report	Guzina (yellow card) 32'; Mišić (yellow card) 81'	Stadium: Asim Ferhatović Hase Stadium; Attendance: 2,000; Referee: Miloš Gigović (Gradiška)

5 August 2018 3	Sloboda Tuzla	0–1	Sarajevo	Tuzla
19:00 CEST (UTC+2)	Alispahić (yellow card) 23'; Vidović (yellow card) 56'; Vasiljević (red card) 56'; Adžem (yellow card) 62'; Baraban (yellow card) 77'	Report	Velkoski 45+1'; Mujakić (yellow card) 85'; Crepulja (yellow card) 90+3'	Stadium: Tušanj City Stadium; Attendance: 3,500; Referee: Dragan Petrović (Banja Luka)

11 August 2018 4	Sarajevo	1–1	GOŠK Gabela	Sarajevo
20:00 CEST (UTC+2)	Ahmetović 6'; Pidro (yellow card) 41'; Handžić (yellow card) 90+3'	Report	Zolj (yellow card) 16'; Anković 59'; Čolić (yellow card) 82'; Ramić (yellow card) 85'; Karamarko (yellow card) 90+3'	Stadium: Asim Ferhatović Hase Stadium; Attendance: 1,500; Referee: Luka Bilbija (Prijedor)

15 August 2018 5	Željezničar	2–2	Sarajevo	Sarajevo
20:15 CEST (UTC+2)	Zajmović 21', 73'; Pavić (yellow card) 57'; Curjuric (yellow card) 76'; Vranješ (yellow card) 81'; Bogičević (yellow card) 90+2'	Report	Tatar 15'; Adukor (yellow card) 19'; Rahmanović (yellow card) 38', (goal) 39'; Stanojević (yellow card) 45+1'; Pidro (yellow card) 70'; Mujakić (yellow card) 85'	Stadium: Grbavica Stadium; Attendance: 11,500; Referee: Haris Kaljanac (Sarajevo)

19 August 2018 6	Sarajevo	4–2	Zrinjski	Sarajevo
20:00 CEST (UTC+2)	Ahmetović 24', 49', 61'; Velkoski 32', (yellow card) 45+3' (yellow-red card) 77'; Mujakić (yellow card) 37'; Stanojević (yellow card) 42'; Mustafić (yellow card) 68'; Bekić (yellow card) 90+3'	Report	Stanić (yellow card) 6'; Čirjak (yellow card) 22'; Todorović (yellow card) 30'; Jakovljević (yellow card) 30' (red card) 31'; Bekrić 45+3'; Bilbija 64'; Galić (yellow card) 77'; Rustemović (yellow card) 87'	Stadium: Asim Ferhatović Hase Stadium; Attendance: 4,500; Referee: Dragan Petrović (Banja Luka)

25 August 2018 7	Zvijezda 09	0–4	Sarajevo	Ugljevik
17:00 CEST (UTC+2)	Filipović (yellow card) 11'; Huseinbašić (yellow card) 25'; Husić (yellow card) 45+2'	Report	Tatar 28'; Ahmetović 38'; Rahmanović 45+1', 55'; Šofranac (yellow card) 59'; Šabanović (yellow card) 63'	Stadium: Ugljevik City Stadium; Attendance: 500; Referee: Elvis Mujić (Banovići)

1 September 2018 8	Čelik	0–0	Sarajevo	Zenica
20:00 CEST (UTC+2)	Okić (yellow card) 27'; Šišić (yellow card) 35'; Bevab (yellow card) 86'; Jamak (yellow card) 90+2'	Report	Tatar (yellow card) 66'; Ahmetović (yellow card) 67'; Stanojević (yellow card) 71'	Stadium: Bilino Polje Stadium; Attendance: 10,000; Referee: Zoran Grbić (Prijedor)

15 September 2018 9	Sarajevo	2–0	Tuzla City	Sarajevo
19:30 CEST (UTC+2)	Rahmanović (yellow card) 47'; Hebibović 63'; Mujakić (yellow card) 77'; Handžić 78'	Report	Fejzić (yellow card) 37'; Stokić (yellow card) 72'; Sarčević (yellow card) 76'; Nukić (yellow card) 80'; Čomor (yellow card) 88'	Stadium: Asim Ferhatović Hase Stadium; Attendance: 3,000; Referee: Goran Paradžik (Ljubuški)

22 September 2018 10	Krupa	1–4	Sarajevo	Krupa na Vrbasu
16:30 CEST (UTC+2)	Makitan (red card) 24'; Slobodan Milanović (yellow card) 25'; Nikodijević 77'	Report	Tatar 7'; Crepulja (yellow card) 42'; Karišik 44' (o.g.); Halilović 47'; Šabanović 68'	Stadium: Stadion FK Krupa; Attendance: 600; Referee: Ermin Sivac (Zenica)

26 September 2018 11	Sarajevo	1–0	Široki Brijeg	Sarajevo
17:30 CEST (UTC+2)	Rahmanović (yellow card) 16'; Tatar 29'; Kovačević (yellow card) 88'	Report	Ćorluka (yellow card) 7'; Kovačić (yellow card) 14'; Kožul (yellow card) 23'; Marković (yellow card) 64'	Stadium: Asim Ferhatović Hase Stadium; Attendance: 3,000; Referee: Dragan Petrović (Banja Luka)

29 September 2018 12	Sarajevo	2–1	Radnik	Sarajevo
20:00 CEST (UTC+2)	Velkoski 10'; Adukor (yellow card) 21'; Handžić 32'; Dupovac (yellow card) 68'; Tatar (yellow card) 79'	Report	Glišić 76'; Franić (yellow card) 39'; Vasić (yellow card) 46'; Hadžić (yellow card) 65'; Peco (yellow card) 77'	Stadium: Asim Hase Ferhatović; Attendance: 2,000; Referee: Elvis Mujić (Banovići)

6 October 2018 13	Mladost Doboj Kakanj	0–6	Sarajevo	Doboj
15:30 CEST (UTC+2)	Sadiković (yellow card) 38'	Report	Ahmetović 23'; Rahmanović 30', 54'; Velkoski 36', 90'; Tatar 64'; Šabanović (yellow card) 71'	Stadium: MGM Farm Arena; Attendance: 1,500; Referee: Goran Paradžik (Ljubuški)

20 October 2018 14	Sarajevo	1–0	Sloboda Tuzla	Sarajevo
17:00 CEST (UTC+2)	Velkoski 61' (pen.); Hebibović (yellow card) 78'	Report	Ignjatović (yellow card) 60'	Stadium: Asim Ferhatović Hase Stadium; Attendance: 2,000; Referee: Dragan Petrović (Banja Luka)

28 October 2018 15	GOŠK Gabela	1–0	Sarajevo	Gabela
14:30 CET (UTC+1)	Hajdarević 37', (yellow card) 53'; Đajić (yellow card) 62'	Report	Rahmanović (yellow card) 41'; Stanojević (yellow card) 68'	Stadium: Stadium Perica-Pero Pavlović; Attendance: 400; Referee: Miloš Gigović (Gradiška)

3 November 2018 16	Sarajevo	2–1	Željezničar	Sarajevo
17:00 CET (UTC+1)	Ahmetović 17', 20'; Rahmanović (yellow card) 27'; Tatar (yellow card) 63'; Šabanović (yellow card) 70' (yellow-red card) 88'; Stanojević (yellow card) 78'; Dupovac (yellow card) 90+4'; Crepulja (yellow card) 90+4'	Report	Bakrač (yellow card) 23' (yellow-red card) 25'; Krpić 31'; Osmanković (yellow card) 90+4'; Stevanović (yellow card) 90+4'	Stadium: Asim Ferhatović Hase Stadium; Attendance: 10,000; Referee: Irfan Peljto (Sarajevo)

10 November 2018 17	Zrinjski	2–2	Sarajevo	Mostar
16:30 CET (UTC+1)	Bilbija 11', 82'; Veselinović (yellow card) 52'; Rustemović (yellow card) 54'; Barišić (yellow card) 60'; Perišić (yellow card) 63'; Jakovljević (yellow card) 71'; Rugašević (yellow card) 83'; Bekrić (yellow card) 90+2'	Report	Adukor (yellow card) 25', (goal) 71'; Hebibović (yellow card) 33'; Velkoski 61' (pen.), (yellow card) 90+4'; Mujakić (yellow card) 80'; Šišić (yellow card) 86'; Mustafić (yellow card) 90+4'	Stadium: Stadion pod Bijelim Brijegom; Attendance: 5,000; Referee: Vladimir Bjelica (I. Sarajevo)

25 November 2018 18	Sarajevo	3–1	Zvijezda 09	Sarajevo
15:00 CET (UTC+1)	Tatar 15'; Velkoski 26'; Crepulja (yellow card) 29'; Ahmetović 34'; Rahmanović (yellow card) 44'; Hebibović (yellow card) 88'	Report	Jovović 22'; Memović (yellow card) 65'	Stadium: Asim Ferhatović Hase Stadium; Attendance: 1,500; Referee: Sabrija Topalović (Zenica)

1 December 2018 19	Sarajevo	3–1	Čelik	Sarajevo
16:00 CET (UTC+1)	Pidro 35'; Rahmanović 54'; Handžić 85'	Report	Mehić (yellow card) 7' (yellow-red card) 38'; Vrhovac 13'; Jurina 44'	Stadium: Asim Ferhatović Hase Stadium; Attendance: 2,000; Referee: Frano Jelić (Široki Brijeg)

23 February 2019 20	Tuzla City	0–3	Sarajevo	Tuzla
14:30 CET (UTC+1)		Report	Velkoski 6'; Stanojević 34'; Ahmetović 76'	Stadium: Tušanj City Stadium; Attendance: 2,200; Referee: Dragan Petrović (Banja Luka)

2 March 2019 21	Sarajevo	2–1	Krupa	Sarajevo
15:00 CET (UTC+1)	Halilović 4', (yellow card) 90+1'; Ahmetović 36'; Stanojević (yellow card) 43'	Report	Miketek (yellow card) 2843'; Nikodijević 73', (yellow card) 74'; Palić (yellow card) 90'	Stadium: Asim Ferhatović Hase Stadium; Attendance: 2,500; Referee: Mateo Musa (Čitluk)

10 March 2019 22	Široki Brijeg	0–3	Sarajevo	Široki Brijeg
18:00 CET (UTC+1)	Perković (yellow card) 48'	Report	Tatar 59'; Hebibović 66'; Ahmetović 70'; Mujakić (yellow card) 81'	Stadium: Pecara Stadium; Attendance: 1,800; Referee: Luka Bilbija (Prijedor)

17 March 2019 23	Sarajevo	0–0	Krupa	Sarajevo
15:00 CET (UTC+1)	Rifet Kapić (yellow card) 87'; Hebibović (yellow card) 90+2'	Report	Palić (yellow card) 42'; Mandić (yellow card) 79' (yellow-red card) 80'	Stadium: Asim Ferhatović Hase Stadium; Attendance: 7,000; Referee: Frano Jelić (Široki Brijeg)

30 March 2019 24	Sarajevo	0–1	Zrinjski	Sarajevo
19:00 CET (UTC+1)	Rahmanović (yellow card) 45'; Hebibović (yellow card) 73'; Stanojević (yellow card) 81'	Report	Curjuric (yellow card) 28'; Stojkić (yellow card) 40'; Mandić 52', (yellow card) 81'; Stanić (yellow card) 66'; Gojković (yellow card) 70'; Brkić (yellow card) 73'; Galić (yellow card) 87'; Perišić (yellow card) 88'	Stadium: Asim Ferhatović Hase Stadium; Attendance: 7,000; Referee: Elvis Mujić (Banovići)

6 April 2019 25	Željezničar	0–3	Sarajevo	Sarajevo
19:30 CEST (UTC+2)	Šabanadžović (yellow card) 77'	Report	Lazić 11'; Velkoski 16'; Tatar (yellow card) 38', (goal) 73'; Crepulja (yellow card) 50'; Stanojević (yellow card) 50'; Rahmanović (yellow card) 90+3'	Stadium: Grbavica Stadium; Attendance: 9,500; Referee: Irfan Peljto (Sarajevo)

14 April 2019 26	Sarajevo	0–0	Široki Brijeg	Sarajevo
19:30 CEST (UTC+2)		Report	Bagarić (yellow card) 29'; Ćorić (yellow card) 31' (yellow-red card) 77'; Popović (yellow card) 90+4'	Stadium: Asim Ferhatović Hase Stadium; Attendance: 4,500; Referee: Dragan Petrović (Banja Luka)

20 April 2019 27	Sloboda Tuzla	2–1	Sarajevo	Tuzla
16:30 CEST (UTC+2)	Vidović (yellow card) 33'; Adžem (yellow card) 39'; Baraban (yellow card) 45+2'; Čivić 54', (yellow card) 71'; Smajić 90+1', (yellow card) 90+2'; Vukliš (yellow card) 90+3'	Report	Rahmanović 32'; Ahmetović (yellow card) 47'; Halilović (yellow card) 90+1'	Stadium: Tušanj City Stadium; Attendance: 3,000; Referee: Miloš Gigović (Gradiška)

24 April 2019 28	Sarajevo	2–0	Mladost Doboj Kakanj	Sarajevo
17:00 CEST (UTC+2)	Hebibović 20'; Stanojević 34'	Report	Delić (yellow card) 33'; Horić (yellow card) 69'	Stadium: Asim Ferhatović Hase Stadium; Attendance: 1,500; Referee: Zoran Grbić (Prijedor)

27 April 2019 29	Radnik	0–0	Sarajevo	Bijeljina
17:00 CEST (UTC+2)	Radović (yellow card) 10'; Maksimović (yellow card) 21'; Bečelić (yellow card) 90'; Bradonjić (yellow card) 90+3'	Report	Rahmanović (yellow card) 10'; Stanojević (yellow card) 31'	Stadium: Gradski stadion Attendance: 600; Referee: Ermin Sivac (Zenica)

3 May 2019 30	Sarajevo	5–0	Čelik	Sarajevo
19:30 CEST (UTC+2)	Tatar 21', 32'; Halilović (yellow card) 22'; Ahmetović 25'; Hebibović 59'; Rahmanović 63'; Šabanović (yellow card) 85'	Report	Jurina (yellow card) 6'	Stadium: Asim Ferhatović Hase Stadium; Attendance: 3,500; Referee: Elvis Mujić (Banovići)

11 May 2019 31	Tuzla City	1–0	Sarajevo	Banovići
17:00 CEST (UTC+2)	Nukić (yellow card) 45+2'; Hasanović 60'; Stjepanović (yellow card) 61'; Trumić (yellow card) 75'; Fejzić (yellow card) 83'	Report	Handžić (yellow card) 45+1'; Mujakić (yellow card) 51'	Stadium: Stadion FK Budućnost; Attendance: 2,500; Referee: Zoran Grbić (Prijedor)

18 May 2019 32	Sarajevo	4–0	Zvijezda 09	Sarajevo
17:00 CEST (UTC+2)	Rahmanović 25'; Hebibović 30'; Ahmetović 33'; Velkoski 44'	Report		Stadium: Asim Ferhatović Hase Stadium; Attendance: 15,500; Referee: Ermin Sivac (Zenica)

25 May 2019 33	GOŠK Gabela	0–2	Sarajevo	Gabela
17:00 CEST (UTC+2)	Hasanhodžić (yellow card) 54'; Hasanović (yellow card) 62'; Bošković (yellow card) 73'	Report	Šišić 9'; Resić (yellow card) 86'; Dervišagić 90+4'	Stadium: Stadium Perica-Pero Pavlović; Attendance: 400; Referee: Luka Bilbija (Prijedor)

=== Cup of Bosnia and Herzegovina ===
==== Round of 32 ====
19 September 2018	Velež	0–1	Sarajevo	Mostar
16:30 CEST (UTC+2)	Fajić (yellow card) 17'; Ovčina (yellow card) 37'; Kuduzović (red card) 90+1'	Report	Rahmanović (yellow card) 37'; Dupovac (yellow card) 55'; Velkoski 58'; Hebibović (yellow card) 85'; Tatar (yellow card) 89'	Stadium: Rođeni Stadium; Attendance: 3,000; Referee: Miloš Gigović (Gradiška)

==== Round of 16 ====
3 October 2018	Rudar Kakanj	0–0 (2–4 p)	Sarajevo	Kakanj
15:30 CEST (UTC+2)	Spahić (yellow card) 83'; Subašić (yellow card) 90+4'	Report	Rahmanović (yellow card) 70'	Stadium: Stadion Pod Vardom; Attendance: 2,000; Referee: Luka Bilbija (Prijedor)
	Penalties
	Hrelja (penalty scored); Ćehajić (penalty missed); Ćizmić (penalty missed); Fočo (penalty scored)		(penalty scored) Velkoski; (penalty scored) Crepulja; (penalty missed) Rahmanović; (penalty scored) Kurdić; (penalty scored) Hodžić

==== Quarter-finals ====
27 February 2019 First leg	Sarajevo	1–0	Zrinjski	Sarajevo
17:00 CET (UTC+1)	Velkoski 9' (pen.); Crepulja (yellow card) 36'; Ahmetović (yellow card) 90'	Report	Bekrić (yellow card) 61'; Gojković (yellow card) 87'; Filipović (yellow card) 89'	Stadium: Asim Ferhatović Hase Stadium; Attendance: 3,500; Referee: Zoran Grbić (Prijedor)

13 March 2019 Second leg	Zrinjski	0–1 (0–2 agg.)	Sarajevo	Mostar
16:00 CET (UTC+1)	Galić (yellow card) 40'; Jakovljević (yellow card) 68'	Report	Stanojević (yellow card) 39'; Halilović (yellow card) 80'; Mujakić (yellow card) 88'; Kovačević (yellow card) 90'; Tatar 90+2', (yellow card) 90+2'	Stadium: Stadion pod Bijelim Brijegom; Attendance: 2,500; Referee: Elvis Mujić (Banovići)

==== Semi-finals ====
3 April 2019 First leg	Sloga Gornje Crnjelovo	1–4	Sarajevo	Bijeljina
16:00 CEST (UTC+2)	Planić (yellow card) 23'; Hadžikadunić 70'	Report	Rahmanović 13' (yellow card) 46'; Mustafić (yellow card) 22'; Handžić 28'; Velkoski 37'; Šišić 50'	Stadium: Gradski stadion Attendance: 600; Referee: Ermin Sivac (Zenica)

10 April 2019 Second leg	Sarajevo	5–0 (9–1 agg.)	Sloga Gornje Crnjelovo	Sarajevo
18:00 CEST (UTC+2)	Šofranac 38'; Dupovac 50', 78'; Kapić 63'; Šišić 85'	Report		Stadium: Asim Ferhatović Hase Stadium; Attendance: 1,000; Referee: Goran Paradžik (Ljubuški)

==== Final ====
8 May 2019 First leg	Sarajevo	3–0	Široki Brijeg	Sarajevo
18:00 CEST (UTC+2)	Rahmanović 9'; Kapić 39'; Mujakić 90+3'	Report	Bagarić (yellow card) 41'; Jurić (yellow card) 56'; Marić (yellow card) 58'	Stadium: Asim Ferhatović Hase Stadium; Attendance: 5,500; Referee: Dragan Petrović (Banja Luka)

15 May 2019 Second leg	Široki Brijeg	1–0 (1–3 agg.)	Sarajevo	Široki Brijeg
17:00 CEST (UTC+2)	Bagarić 23'; Kovačić (yellow card) 39'; Matić (yellow card) 77'; Vukoja (yellow card) 79'	Report	Kurdić (yellow card) 62' (red card) 72'; Kapić (yellow card) 75'; Tatar (yellow card) 90+3'	Stadium: Pecara Stadium; Attendance: 2,200; Referee: Elvis Mujić (Banovići)

=== UEFA Europa League ===
==== First qualifying round ====
11 July 2018 First leg	Banants (Armenia)	1–2	(Bosnia and Herzegovina) Sarajevo	Yerevan, Armenia
17:30 AMT (UTC+4)	Ayvazyan 34'; Sibo (yellow card) 64'; Fagner (yellow card) 90'	Report	Ahmetović 16'; Halilović 21'; Mujakić (yellow card) 33'	Stadium: Banants Stadium; Attendance: 3,000; Referee: Rohit Saggi (Norway)

19 July 2018 Second leg	Sarajevo (Bosnia and Herzegovina)	3–0 (5–1 agg.)	(Armenia) Banants	Sarajevo, Bosnia and Herzegovina
20:15 CEST (UTC+2)	Mujakić 31'; Ahmetović 38'; Mustafić (yellow card) 51'; Resić 72'	Report	Sibo (yellow card) 12'; Stanojević (yellow card) 45+2'	Stadium: Asim Ferhatović Hase Stadium; Attendance: 8,125; Referee: Lionel Tschudi (Switzerland)

==== Second qualifying round ====
26 July 2018 First leg	Atalanta (Italy)	2–2	(Bosnia and Herzegovina) Sarajevo	Reggio Emilia, Italy
20:30 CEST (UTC+2)	Toloi 11'; Mancini 45'; de Roon (yellow card) 66'	Report	Rahmanović (yellow card) 16'; Handžić 67'; Šišić 72'; Stanojević (yellow card) 73'; Velkoski (yellow card) 76'	Stadium: Mapei Stadium – Città del Tricolore; Attendance: 7,518; Referee: Tamás Bognár (Hungary)

2 August 2018 Second leg	Sarajevo (Bosnia and Herzegovina)	0–8 (2–10 agg.)	(Italy) Atalanta	Sarajevo, Bosnia and Herzegovina
20:15 CEST (UTC+2)	Hebibović (yellow card) 37'; Adukor (yellow card) 44'	Report	Toloi (yellow card) 3'; Palomino 4'; Gómez 15', 28'; Masiello 18'; Ahmetović 39' (o.g.); Barrow 51', 70', 87'	Stadium: Asim Ferhatović Hase Stadium; Attendance: 23,820; Referee: Stuart Attwell (England)

== Statistics ==
=== Appearances and goals ===
No.	Pos	Nat	Player	Total		Premier League		Cup of BiH		Europa League	
No.	Pos	Nat	Player	Apps	Goals	Apps	Goals	Apps	Goals	Apps	Goals
Goalkeepers
13	GK	(Bosnia and Herzegovina) BIH	Vladan Kovačević	36	0	30	0	6	0	0	0
16	GK	(Slovenia) SVN	Elvis Džafić	2	0	0	0	2	0	0	0
35	GK	(Bosnia and Herzegovina) BIH	Belmin Dizdarević	1	0	1	0	0	0	0	0
Defenders
2	DF	(Bosnia and Herzegovina) BIH	Armin Imamović	0	0	0	0	0	0	0	0
3	DF	(Bosnia and Herzegovina) BIH	Selmir Pidro	22	1	17	1	2	0	3	0
4	DF	(Bosnia and Herzegovina) BIH	Halid Šabanović	17	1	10+4	1	1+1	0	0+1	0
6	DF	(Serbia) SRB	Darko Lazić	17	1	13	1	4	0	0	0
18	DF	(Bosnia and Herzegovina) BIH	Nihad Mujakić	37	2	27	0	5+1	1	4	1
19	DF	(Bosnia and Herzegovina) BIH	Almir Bekić	15	0	7+3	0	4+1	0	0	0
22	DF	(Montenegro) MNE	Aleksandar Šofranac	10	1	4+3	0	2+1	1	0	0
24	DF	(Bosnia and Herzegovina) BIH	Andrej Đokanović	2	0	1	0	1	0	0	0
25	DF	(Ghana) GHA	Joachim Adukor	19	1	15	1	0	0	4	0
29	DF	(Bosnia and Herzegovina) BIH	Amer Dupovac	29	2	18+3	0	3+3	2	2	0
Midfielders
5	MF	(Serbia) SRB	Miloš Stanojević	33	2	24+1	2	4	0	1+3	0
7	MF	(Bosnia and Herzegovina) BIH	Anel Hebibović	36	5	26+1	5	5	0	4	0
8	MF	(Bosnia and Herzegovina) BIH	Ševkija Resić	12	2	2+6	1	2+1	0	0+1	1
10	MF	(Bosnia and Herzegovina) BIH	Amar Rahmanović	39	11	25+3	9	6+1	2	4	0
14	MF	(Bosnia and Herzegovina) BIH	Rifet Kapić	18	2	6+6	0	4+2	2	0	0
17	MF	(Bosnia and Herzegovina) BIH	Aladin Šišić	22	4	8+6	1	3+1	2	4	1
20	MF	(Bosnia and Herzegovina) BIH	Đani Salčin	2	0	0+1	0	0+1	0	0	0
21	MF	(Croatia) CRO	Ljuban Crepulja	26	0	16+5	0	4+1	0	0	0
23	MF	(Bosnia and Herzegovina) BIH	Alen Mustafić	15	0	5+4	0	4	0	1+1	0
25	MF	(Bosnia and Herzegovina) BIH	Amar Sabljica	0	0	0	0	0	0	0	0
26	MF	(Bosnia and Herzegovina) BIH	Emir Halilović	35	3	14+10	2	5+2	0	4	1
27	MF	(Bosnia and Herzegovina) BIH	Numan Kurdić	9	0	1+4	0	4	0	0	0
30	MF	(Bosnia and Herzegovina) BIH	Haris Konjalić	0	0	0	0	0	0	0	0
Forwards
9	FW	(Bosnia and Herzegovina) BIH	Mersudin Ahmetović	39	16	26+3	14	4+2	0	4	2
11	FW	(North Macedonia) MKD	Krste Velkoski	43	14	29+2	11	6+2	3	4	0
15	FW	(Bosnia and Herzegovina) BIH	Kenan Dervišagić	1	1	0+1	1	0	0	0	0
28	FW	(Bosnia and Herzegovina) BIH	Haris Handžić	31	7	6+18	5	3	1	0+4	1
31	FW	(Bosnia and Herzegovina) BIH	Ahmed Hasanović	1	0	0	0	0+1	0	0	0
32	FW	(Bosnia and Herzegovina) BIH	Benjamin Tatar	37	13	27+3	12	3+2	1	0+2	0
37	FW	(Brazil) BRA	Nathan	3	0	1+2	0	0	0	0	0
39	FW	(Croatia) CRO	Mario Crnički	0	0	0	0	0	0	0	0
Players who have made an appearance this season but have left the club
1	GK	(Bosnia and Herzegovina) BIH	Nedin Tucaković	0	0	0	0	0	0	0	0
2	DF	(Bosnia and Herzegovina) BIH	Dušan Hodžić	5	0	2+1	0	1	0	1	0
30	GK	(Serbia) SRB	Bojan Pavlović	6	0	2	0	0	0	4	0

Number after the "+" sign represents the number of games player started the game on the bench and was substituted on.

=== Goalscorers ===
Rank	No.	Pos.	Nat.	Player	Premier League	Cup of BiH	Europa League	Total
1	9	FW	(Bosnia and Herzegovina)	Mersudin Ahmetović	14	0	2	16
2	11	FW	(North Macedonia)	Krste Velkoski	11	3	0	14
3	32	FW	(Bosnia and Herzegovina)	Benjamin Tatar	12	1	0	13
4	10	MF	(Bosnia and Herzegovina)	Amar Rahmanović	9	2	0	11
5	28	FW	(Bosnia and Herzegovina)	Haris Handžić	5	1	1	7
6	7	MF	(Bosnia and Herzegovina)	Anel Hebibović	5	0	0	5
7	17	MF	(Bosnia and Herzegovina)	Aladin Šišić	1	2	1	4
8	26	FW	(Bosnia and Herzegovina)	Emir Halilović	2	0	1	3
9	5	MF	(Serbia)	Miloš Stanojević	2	0	0	2
9	8	MF	(Bosnia and Herzegovina)	Ševkija Resić	1	0	1	2
9	14	MF	(Bosnia and Herzegovina)	Rifet Kapić	0	2	0	2
9	18	DF	(Bosnia and Herzegovina)	Nihad Mujakić	0	1	1	2
9	29	DF	(Bosnia and Herzegovina)	Amer Dupovac	0	2	0	2
14	3	DF	(Bosnia and Herzegovina)	Selmir Pidro	1	0	0	1
14	4	DF	(Bosnia and Herzegovina)	Halid Šabanović	1	0	0	1
14	6	DF	(Serbia)	Darko Lazić	1	0	0	1
14	15	FW	(Bosnia and Herzegovina)	Kenan Dervišagić	1	0	0	1
14	22	DF	(Montenegro)	Aleksandar Šofranac	0	1	0	1
14	25	DF	(Ghana)	Joachim Adukor	1	0	0	1
Own goals					1	0	0	1
Total					68	15	7	90

=== Hat-tricks ===
Player	Against	Result	Date	Competition	Ref
(Bosnia and Herzegovina) Mersudin Ahmetović	(Bosnia and Herzegovina) Zrinjski	4–2 (H)	19 August 2018	Premier League	

(H) – Home; (A) – Away

=== Clean sheets ===
Rank	No.	Nat.	Player	Premier League	Cup of BiH	Europa League	Total
1	13	(Bosnia and Herzegovina)	Vladan Kovačević	16	4	0	20
2	16	(Slovenia)	Elvis Džafić	0	2	0	2
2	30	(Serbia)	Bojan Pavlović	1	0	1	2
4	35	(Bosnia and Herzegovina)	Belmin Dizdarević	1	0	0	1
Total				18	6	1	25

== Awards ==
=== Player of the Month (by Optika Salihbegović) ===
Month	Player
July	(Bosnia and Herzegovina) Haris Handžić
August	(Bosnia and Herzegovina) Amar Rahmanović
September	(Bosnia and Herzegovina) Benjamin Tatar
October	(Bosnia and Herzegovina) Mersudin Ahmetović
November	(North Macedonia) Krste Velkoski
February	(Serbia) Miloš Stanojević
March	(Bosnia and Herzegovina) Vladan Kovačević
April	(Bosnia and Herzegovina) Anel Hebibović

=== Ismir Pintol Trophy ===
Season	Player
2018–19	(Bosnia and Herzegovina) Nihad Mujakić

=== Premier League Player of the Year ===
Season	Player
2018–19	(Bosnia and Herzegovina) Mersudin Ahmetović

=== Premier League Goalkeeper of the Year ===
Season	Player
2018–19	(Bosnia and Herzegovina) Vladan Kovačević

=== Premier League Manager of the Year ===
Season	Manager
2018–19	(Bosnia and Herzegovina) Husref Musemić

=== Kristalnih 11 ===
==== Player of the Year ====
Season	Player
2018–19	(Bosnia and Herzegovina) Mersudin Ahmetović

==== Manager of the Year ====
Season	Manager
2018–19	(Bosnia and Herzegovina) Husref Musemić

==== Young Player of the Year ====
Season	Player
2018–19	(Bosnia and Herzegovina) Nihad Mujakić

==== Premier League Team of the Year ====
Position	Player
GK	(Bosnia and Herzegovina) Vladan Kovačević
DF	(Bosnia and Herzegovina) Selmir Pidro
DF	(Bosnia and Herzegovina) Nihad Mujakić
MF	(Bosnia and Herzegovina) Anel Hebibović
MF	(Serbia) Miloš Stanojević
MF	(Bosnia and Herzegovina) Amar Rahmanović
FW	(Bosnia and Herzegovina) Benjamin Tatar
FW	(Bosnia and Herzegovina) Mersudin Ahmetović
