= 2019–20 FK Sarajevo season =

FK Sarajevo
2019–20 season
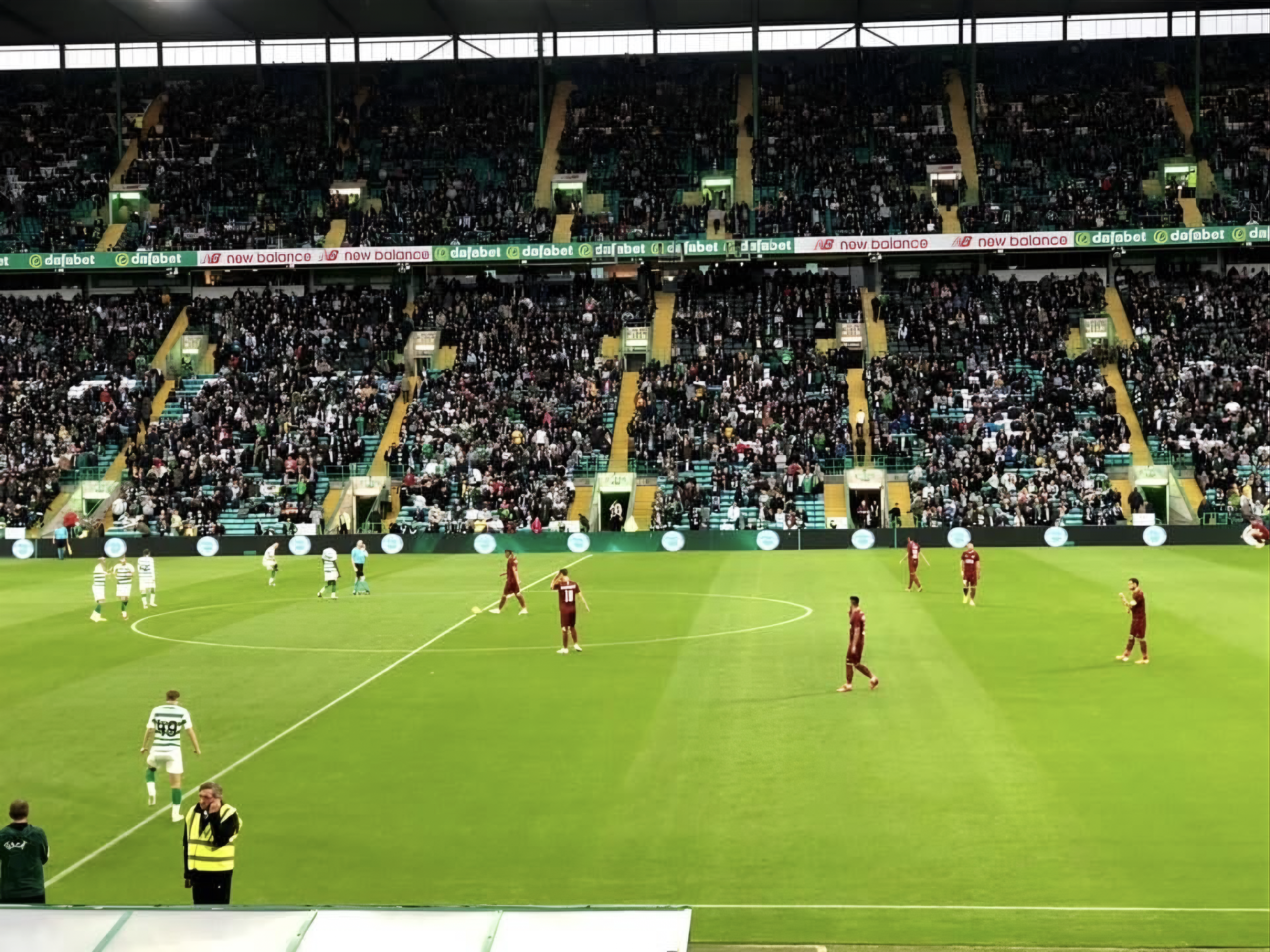
- Match vs Celtic (17 July 2019)
- Owner: Nguyễn Hoài Nam (60%); Vincent Tan (30%)
- Chairman: Senad Jahić
- Manager: Husref Musemić (until 2 December); Vinko Marinović (from 30 December)
- Stadium: Asim Ferhatović Hase Stadium
- Premier League BiH: Winners
- Cup of BiH: Round of 16
- UEFA Champions League: First qualifying Round
- UEFA Europa League: Third qualifying Round
- Top goalscorer: League: Mersudin Ahmetović (13); All: Mersudin Ahmetović (13)
- Highest home attendance: 24,620 vs Celtic (9 July 2019)
- Lowest home attendance: 2,500 vs Zvijezda 09 (15 September 2019)
- Average home league attendance: 5,161
- Biggest win: Sarajevo 6–2 Tuzla City (22 February 2020)
- Biggest defeat: Željezničar 5–2 Sarajevo (31 August 2019)
| Home colours | Away colours | Third colours |

The 2019–20 season was Sarajevo's 71st season in existence, and their 26th consecutive season in the top flight of Bosnian football, the Premier League of BiH. Besides competing in the Premier League, the team also competed in the National Cup. Sarajevo competed in the qualifications for the UEFA Champions League, as well as competing in the qualifications for the UEFA Europa League. The season covers the period from 14 June 2019 to 1 June 2020.

In that season, the league ended abruptly on 1 June 2020 due to the COVID-19 pandemic in Bosnia and Herzegovina and by default Sarajevo won their second consecutive league title as the first placed team, also qualifying to the 2020–21 UEFA Champions League qualifying rounds as well.

== Squad information ==
=== First-team squad ===
As of 6 February 2020

Note: Flags indicate national team as defined under FIFA eligibility rules; some limited exceptions apply. Players may hold more than one non-FIFA nationality.

| No. | Pos. | Nation | Player |
|---|---|---|---|
| 2 | DF | BIH | Dušan Hodžić |
| 3 | DF | BIH | Selmir Pidro |
| 4 | DF | BIH | Halid Šabanović |
| 6 | DF | SRB | Darko Lazić |
| 7 | MF | BIH | Anel Hebibović (captain) |
| 8 | MF | SRB | Nebojša Gavrić |
| 9 | FW | BIH | Mersudin Ahmetović (captain) |
| 10 | MF | BIH | Amar Rahmanović |
| 11 | FW | MKD | Krste Velkoski (captain) |
| 13 | GK | BIH | Vladan Kovačević (captain) |
| 15 | DF | CRO | Hrvoje Miličević |
| 16 | GK | SVN | Elvis Džafić |
| 17 | MF | BIH | Aladin Šišić |
| 20 | MF | BIH | Đani Salčin |

| No. | Pos. | Nation | Player |
|---|---|---|---|
| 21 | FW | BIH | Slobodan Milanović |
| 22 | MF | BIH | Ivan Jukić |
| 23 | MF | BIH | Zinedin Mustedanagić (on loan from (Czech Republic) Sparta Prague) |
| 24 | DF | BIH | Andrej Đokanović |
| 25 | DF | BIH | Besim Šerbečić (on loan from (Norway) Rosenborg) |
| 27 | DF | BIH | Numan Kurdić |
| 28 | FW | BIH | Haris Handžić |
| 29 | DF | BIH | Amer Dupovac (captain) |
| 31 | MF | BIH | Tino-Sven Sušić |
| 32 | FW | BIH | Benjamin Tatar |
| 37 | FW | BRA | Nathan |
| 40 | DF | BIH | Armin Imamović |
| 44 | GK | BIH | Matej Marković |
| 45 | MF | CRO | Mirko Oremuš |

=== Youth academy players ===
FK Sarajevo Academy players that received a first-team squad call-up.

| No. | Pos. | Nation | Player |
|---|---|---|---|
| 14 | MF | BIH | Amar Sabljica |
| 15 | FW | BIH | Kenan Dervišagić |
| 19 | MF | BIH | Amar Jašarević |

| No. | Pos. | Nation | Player |
|---|---|---|---|
| 30 | MF | BIH | Haris Konjalić |
| 35 | GK | BIH | Belmin Dizdarević |

== Transfers ==
=== In ===
| Date | Pos. | Player | From | Fee | Ref. |
|---|---|---|---|---|---|
| 11 June 2019 | MF | (Serbia) Nebojša Gavrić | (Serbia) Bačka | Free transfer | |
| 17 June 2019 | FW | (Bosnia and Herzegovina) Slobodan Milanović | (Bosnia and Herzegovina) Krupa | €50,000 | |
| 25 June 2019 | MF | (Croatia) Mirko Oremuš | (Israel) Hapoel Ra'anana | Free transfer | |
| 26 June 2019 | FW | (Bosnia and Herzegovina) Gedeon Guzina | (Bosnia and Herzegovina) Mladost Doboj Kakanj | Free transfer | |
| 2 July 2019 | DF | (Bosnia and Herzegovina) Bojan Letić | (Czech Republic) Karviná | Free transfer | |
| 12 July 2019 | GK | (Bosnia and Herzegovina) Matej Marković | (Bosnia and Herzegovina) Krupa | Free transfer | |
| 23 January 2020 | MF | (Bosnia and Herzegovina) Ivan Jukić | (Poland) Korona Kielce | Free transfer | |
| 24 January 2020 | DF | (Croatia) Hrvoje Miličević | (Kazakhstan) Aktobe | Free transfer | |
| 1 February 2020 | MF | (Bosnia and Herzegovina) Tino-Sven Sušić | (Austria) TSV Hartberg | Free transfer | |
| Total | | | | €50,000 | |

=== Out ===
| Date | Pos. | Player | To | Fee | Ref. |
|---|---|---|---|---|---|
| 28 May 2019 | DF | (Bosnia and Herzegovina) Almir Bekić | (Bosnia and Herzegovina) Sloboda Tuzla | End of contract | |
| 30 May 2019 | GK | (Bosnia and Herzegovina) Bojan Pavlović | (Bosnia and Herzegovina) Čelik Zenica | End of contract | |
| 13 June 2019 | DF | (Montenegro) Aleksandar Šofranac | (Montenegro) Sutjeska Nikšić | Contract termination | |
| 16 June 2019 | DF | (Ghana) Joachim Adukor | (Hungary) Diósgyőri | End of contract | |
| 17 June 2019 | MF | (Croatia) Ljuban Crepulja | (Romania) Astra Giurgiu | End of contract | |
| 17 June 2019 | FW | (Bosnia and Herzegovina) Emir Halilović | (Slovakia) Spartak Trnava | End of contract | |
| 1 July 2019 | FW | (Bosnia and Herzegovina) Sanin Klarić | Free agent | End of contract | |
| 3 July 2019 | MF | (Bosnia and Herzegovina) Sanjin Lelić | (Belgium) Roeselare | End of contract | |
| 3 July 2019 | MF | (Bosnia and Herzegovina) Zoran Blagojević | (Bosnia and Herzegovina) Alfa Modriča | Contract termination | |
| 31 July 2019 | MF | (Bosnia and Herzegovina) Vedad Gljiva | (Bosnia and Herzegovina) Bosna Visoko | End of contract | |
| 16 January 2020 | DF | (Bosnia and Herzegovina) Bojan Letić | (Serbia) Radnički Niš | Contract termination | |
| 31 January 2020 | DF | (Serbia) Miloš Stanojević | (Turkey) Ankaragücü | €200,000 | |
| 4 February 2020 | FW | (Bosnia and Herzegovina) Gedeon Guzina | (Croatia) Istra 1961 | Contract termination | |
| Total | | | | €200,000 | |

=== Loans in ===
| Start date | End date | Pos. | Player | From | Ref. |
|---|---|---|---|---|---|
| 4 July 2019 | End of season | DF | (Bosnia and Herzegovina) Besim Šerbečić | (Norway) Rosenborg | |
| 17 January 2020 | End of season | MF | (Bosnia and Herzegovina) Zinedin Mustedanagić | (Czech Republic) Sparta Prague | |

=== Loans out ===
| Start date | End date | Pos. | Player | To | Ref. |
|---|---|---|---|---|---|
| 10 June 2019 | End of season | FW | (Bosnia and Herzegovina) Ahmed Hasanović | (Bosnia and Herzegovina) Goražde | |
| 17 June 2019 | End of season | MF | (Bosnia and Herzegovina) Ševkija Resić | (Bosnia and Herzegovina) Čelik Zenica | |
| 15 July 2019 | 31 December 2019 | FW | (Croatia) Mario Crnički | (Bosnia and Herzegovina) Mladost Doboj Kakanj | |
| 15 January 2020 | End of season | DF | (Bosnia and Herzegovina) Hamza Bešić | (Bosnia and Herzegovina) Olimpik | |
| 20 January 2020 | End of season | FW | (Bosnia and Herzegovina) Kenan Dervišagić | (Bosnia and Herzegovina) Rudar Kakanj | |
| 25 January 2020 | End of season | MF | (Bosnia and Herzegovina) Alen Mustafić | (Slovakia) Slovan Bratislava | |
| 25 January 2020 | End of season | FW | (Croatia) Mario Crnički | (Bosnia and Herzegovina) Čelik Zenica | |
| 2 February 2020 | End of season | DF | (Bosnia and Herzegovina) Mufid Salčinović | (Bosnia and Herzegovina) Čapljina | |

== Kit ==
| Supplier | Sponsor |
|---|---|
| (United States) Nike, Inc. | (Turkey) Turkish Airlines |

== Friendlies ==
Win Draw Loss

=== Pre-season ===
| 19 June 2019 Friendly | Sarajevo (Bosnia and Herzegovina) | 1–2 | (Bosnia and Herzegovina) Mladost Doboj Kakanj | Butmir |
| 18:00 | Rahmanović 22' | Report | Bojo 2'; Atajić 17' | Stadium: Butmir Training Centre; Referee: Admir Šehović |

| 23 June 2019 Friendly | Sarajevo (Bosnia and Herzegovina) | 5–1 | (Albania) Partizani Tirana | Gornja Radgona, Slovenia |
| 17:00 | Tatar 7', 45'; Ahmetović 39'; Šišić 45+1'; Mustafić 88' | Report | Kalari 75' | Stadium: Hipodrom Gornja Radgona |

| 26 June 2019 Friendly | Sarajevo (Bosnia and Herzegovina) | 0–2 | (Czech Republic) Slovácko | Rogatec, Slovenia |
| 18:15 | | Report | Kalabiška 60'; Dvořák 75' | Stadium: Sport park Rogatec; Attendance: 30 |

| 30 June 2019 Friendly | Domžale (Slovenia) | 3–2 | (Bosnia and Herzegovina) Sarajevo | Rogatec, Slovenia |
| 18:30 | Ćorluka 26'; Dobrovoljc 32'; Kolobarić 53' | Report | Milanović 12'; Hodžić (yellow card) 41'; Ahmetović 44'; Oremuš (yellow card) 83' | Stadium: Sport park Rogatec |

=== Mid-season ===
| 25 July 2019 Friendly | Sarajevo (Bosnia and Herzegovina) | 3–2 | (Bosnia and Herzegovina) Goražde | Butmir |
| 18:00 | Kebbeh 20'; Guzina 33', 60' | Report | Hasanović | Stadium: Butmir Training Centre |

| 5 September 2019 Friendly | Sarajevo (Bosnia and Herzegovina) | 3–2 | (Qatar) Muaither | Butmir |
| 17:30 | Milanović 26'; Guzina | Report | Salman; Diawara | Stadium: Butmir Training Centre |

| 15 October 2019 Friendly | Sarajevo (Bosnia and Herzegovina) | 5–0 | (Bosnia and Herzegovina) Rudar Kakanj | Butmir |
| 15:00 | Rahmanović 12'; Ahmetović 18', 32', 32'; Hebibović 76' | Report | | Stadium: Butmir Training Centre |

| 19 November 2019 Friendly | Sarajevo (Bosnia and Herzegovina) | 5–0 | (Bosnia and Herzegovina) Olimpik | Butmir |
| 13:00 | Guzina 2'; Tatar; Škrbić 60', 64'; Mustafić 84' | Report | | Stadium: Butmir Training Centre |

| 21 January 2020 Friendly | Ljubuški (Bosnia and Herzegovina) | 2–0 | (Bosnia and Herzegovina) Sarajevo | Ljubuški |
| 14:00 | Buhač 22' (pen.); Lauc 85' | Report | | Stadium: Babovac Stadium |

| 27 January 2020 Friendly | Sarajevo (Bosnia and Herzegovina) | 3–0 | (Bosnia and Herzegovina) Rudar Kakanj | Butmir |
| 13:00 | Rahmanović 20'; Stanojević (yellow card) 30'; Velkoski 49'; Gačan 67' (o.g.) | Report | | Stadium: Butmir Training Centre |

| 2 February 2020 Friendly | Sarajevo (Bosnia and Herzegovina) | 0–0 | (Ukraine) Desna Chernihiv | Antalya |
| 15:00 | Oremuš (yellow card) 40' | Report |

| 6 February 2020 Friendly | Sarajevo (Bosnia and Herzegovina) | 2–2 | (Serbia) Radnički Niš | Belek |
| 13:00 | Mustedanagić 41', 67'; Oremuš (yellow card) 63' | Report | Meleg 29'; Stevanović 75' |

| 9 February 2020 Friendly | Sarajevo (Bosnia and Herzegovina) | 0–0 | (Kazakhstan) Tobol | Antalya |
| 15:00 | | Report |

| 16 February 2020 Friendly | Sarajevo (Bosnia and Herzegovina) | 3–0 | (Bosnia and Herzegovina) Goražde | Butmir |
| 14:00 | Rahmanović 6'; Jukić 50'; Handžić 86' | Report | | Stadium: Butmir Training Centre |

== Competitions ==
=== Overview ===
| Competition | First match | Last match | Starting round | Final position | Record | | | | | | | |
| Competition | First match | Last match | Starting round | Final position | Pld | W | D | L | GF | GA | GD | Win % |
|---|---|---|---|---|---|---|---|---|---|---|---|---|
| Premier League | 21 July 2019 | 7 March 2020 | Matchday 1 | 1st | 22 | 13 | 6 | 3 | 38 | 19 | +19 | 59.09 |
| Cup of BiH | 18 September 2019 | 2 October 2019 | First round | Second round | 2 | 1 | 0 | 1 | 6 | 5 | +1 | 50.00 |
| Champions League | 9 July 2019 | 17 July 2019 | First qualifying round | First qualifying round | 2 | 0 | 0 | 2 | 2 | 5 | −3 | 0.00 |
| Europa League | 8 August 2019 | 15 August 2019 | Third qualifying round | Third qualifying round | 2 | 0 | 1 | 1 | 1 | 2 | −1 | 0.00 |
| Total | | | | | 28 | 14 | 7 | 7 | 47 | 31 | +16 | 50.00 |

Last updated: complete
Source: Competitions

=== Premier League ===
==== League table ====
| Pos | Team | Pld | W | D | L | GF | GA | GD | Pts | Qualification or relegation |
|---|---|---|---|---|---|---|---|---|---|---|
| 1 | Sarajevo (C) | 22 | 13 | 6 | 3 | 38 | 19 | +19 | 45 | Qualification for the Champions League first qualifying round |
| 2 | Željezničar | 22 | 12 | 6 | 4 | 43 | 21 | +22 | 42 | Qualification for the Europa League first qualifying round |
| 3 | Zrinjski Mostar | 22 | 11 | 5 | 6 | 30 | 12 | +18 | 38 | Qualification for the Europa League first qualifying round |
| 4 | Borac Banja Luka | 22 | 10 | 6 | 6 | 29 | 23 | +6 | 36 | Qualification for the Europa League first qualifying round |
| 5 | Tuzla City | 22 | 10 | 5 | 7 | 27 | 29 | −2 | 35 | |

Source: Rezultati.com
Rules for classification: 1) Points; 2) Goal difference; 3) Goals scored; 4) Head-to-head points; 5) Head-to-head goal difference; 6) Head-to-head away goals (only if two teams); 7) Head-to-head goals scored; 8) Goal difference; 9) Play-off. (Criteria 2 and 3 are not used to decide champion, UEFA competition qualification, or relegation)
(C) Champions

==== Results summary ====
| Overall | | | | | | | | Home | | | | | | Away | | | | | |
| Pld | W | D | L | GF | GA | GD | Pts | W | D | L | GF | GA | GD | W | D | L | GF | GA | GD |
|---|---|---|---|---|---|---|---|---|---|---|---|---|---|---|---|---|---|---|---|
| 22 | 13 | 6 | 3 | 38 | 19 | +19 | 45 | 10 | 0 | 1 | 25 | 8 | +17 | 3 | 6 | 2 | 13 | 11 | +2 |

Last updated: complete.
Source: BH Telecom Premier League of Bosnia and Herzegovina

==== Results by round ====
| Round | 1 | 2 | 3 | 4 | 5 | 6 | 7 | 8 | 9 | 10 | 11 | 12 | 13 | 14 | 15 | 16 | 17 | 18 | 19 | 20 | 21 | 22 |
|---|---|---|---|---|---|---|---|---|---|---|---|---|---|---|---|---|---|---|---|---|---|---|
| Ground | H | A | H | A | H | H | A | H | A | H | A | A | H | A | H | A | A | H | A | H | A | H |
| Result | W | D | W | D | W | W | L | W | L | W | W | D | W | D | W | D | W | L | D | W | W | W |
| Position | 4 | 3 | 1 | 3 | 2 | 1 | 3 | 2 | 3 | 3 | 2 | 2 | 1 | 1 | 1 | 2 | 1 | 2 | 1 | 1 | 1 | 1 |

Source: sportsport.ba
A = Away; H = Home; W = Win; D = Draw; L = Loss

==== Matches ====
| 21 July 2019 1 | Sarajevo | 1–0 | Zrinjski | Sarajevo |
| 19:00 CEST (UTC+2) | Šabanović (yellow card) 38'; Tatar 46'; Lazić (yellow card) 90' | Report | Hadžić (yellow card) 90' | Stadium: Asim Ferhatović Hase Stadium; Attendance: 7,000; Referee: Elvis Mujić (Banovići) |
Note: Sarajevo manager Husref Musemić was cautioned (yellow card) in the 86th minute.

| 28 July 2019 2 | Čelik | 0–0 | Sarajevo | Zenica |
| 20:30 CEST (UTC+2) | Huseinbašić (yellow card) 44'; Aganspahić (yellow card) 76' | Report | Guzina (yellow card) 39'; Gavrić (yellow card) 45+1'; Lazić (yellow card) 64'; Hebibović (yellow card) 90+2' | Stadium: Bilino Polje Stadium; Attendance: 9,500; Referee: Dragan Petrović (Banja Luka) |

| 3 August 2019 3 | Sarajevo | 3–0 | Sloboda Tuzla | Sarajevo |
| 20:30 CEST (UTC+2) | Handžić 5', (yellow card) 71'; Gavrić (yellow card) 21'; Hebibović 76', 85' | Report | Salihović (yellow card) 25'; Beganović (yellow card) 57' | Stadium: Asim Ferhatović Hase Stadium; Attendance: 4,000; Referee: Zoran Grbić (Prijedor) |

| 28 August 2019 (Note: Match of Round 4 was postponed because of Sarajevo's partitipation in UEFA Europa League third qualifying round.) 4 | Široki Brijeg | 0–0 | Sarajevo | Široki Brijeg |
| 20:00 CEST (UTC+2) | Matić (yellow card) 69' | Report | Hodžić (yellow card) 83' | Stadium: Pecara Stadium; Attendance: 2,000; Referee: Luka Bilbija (Prijedor) |

| 19 August 2019 5 | Sarajevo | 2–1 | Radnik | Sarajevo |
| 20:30 CEST (UTC+2) | Velkoski 31'; Mustafić (yellow card) 38'; Šerbečić 79'; Tatar (yellow card) 83' | Report | Mekić (yellow card) 37'; Peco 64'; Radović (yellow card) 78' | Stadium: Asim Ferhatović Hase Stadium; Attendance: 3,667; Referee: Dragan Petrović (Banja Luka) |

| 24 August 2019 6 | Sarajevo | 2–1 | Velež | Sarajevo |
| 18:00 CEST (UTC+2) | Lazić (yellow card) 18'; Ahmetović (yellow card) 50'; Šerbečić 51'; Handžić 61'; Gavrić (yellow card) 67' | Report | Brandao 26'; Vehabović (yellow card) 45'; Hasanović (yellow card) 50'; Urdinov (yellow card) 56' | Stadium: Asim Ferhatović Hase Stadium; Attendance: 4,500; Referee: Sabrija Topalović (Zenica) |
Note: Sarajevo manager Husref Musemić was cautioned (yellow card) in the 50th minute.

| 31 August 2019 7 | Željezničar | 5–2 | Sarajevo | Sarajevo |
| 20:00 CEST (UTC+2) | Krpić 7', 38'; Bojo 59'; Sadiković 76'; Alispahić 90+2' | Report | Hebibović 1'; Sipović 45+1' (o.g.); Šerbečić (yellow card) 53'; Gavrić (yellow card) 56'; Đokanović (yellow card) 56'; Letić (yellow card) 76' | Stadium: Grbavica Stadium; Attendance: 11,017; Referee: Haris Kaljanac (Sarajevo) |

| 15 September 2019 8 | Sarajevo | 2–0 | Zvijezda 09 | Sarajevo |
| 19:30 CEST (UTC+2) | Mustafić 43'; Ahmetović 53', (yellow card) 54'; Lazić (yellow card) 63' | Report | Tojčić (yellow card) 87'; Blagojević (yellow card) 90+1' | Stadium: Asim Ferhatović Hase Stadium; Attendance: 2,500; Referee: Sabrija Topalović (Zenica) |
Note: Sarajevo manager Husref Musemić was cautioned (yellow card) in the 86th minute.

| 21 September 2019 9 | Tuzla City | 2–1 | Sarajevo | Tuzla |
| 16:30 CEST (UTC+2) | Crnkić (yellow card) 8', (goal) 46'; Ubiparip 9'; Nukić (yellow card) 40'; Zlatković (yellow card) 81' | Report | Mustafić (yellow card) 38'; Lazić (yellow card) 49'; Rahmanović (yellow card) 78'; Letić (yellow card) 88'; Ahmetović 90+1' | Stadium: Tušanj City Stadium; Attendance: 2,500; Referee: Dragan Petrović (Banja Luka) |

| 25 September 2019 10 | Sarajevo | 1–0 | Borac | Sarajevo |
| 18:00 CEST (UTC+2) | Milanović (yellow card) 5'; Đokanović (yellow card) 85'; Ahmetović 87'; Hebibović (yellow card) 90+1' | Report | Čomor (yellow card) 42': Vujaklija (yellow card) 53'; Lučić (yellow card) 77'; Kajkut (yellow card) 89'; Runić (yellow card) 89' | Stadium: Asim Ferhatović Hase Stadium; Attendance: 3,100; Referee: Goran Paradžik (Ljubuški) |

| 29 September 2019 11 | Mladost Doboj Kakanj | 0–3 | Sarajevo | Doboj |
| 16:00 CEST (UTC+2) | Horić (yellow card) 36'; Hreljić (yellow card) 68'; Bajić (yellow card) 79' (yellow-red card) 90' | Report | Milanović 10'; Ahmetović 33'; Rahmanović 88' | Stadium: MGM Farm Arena; Attendance: 2,000; Referee: Luka Bilbija (Prijedor) |

| 5 October 2019 12 | Zrinjski | 0–0 | Sarajevo | Mostar |
| 15:30 CEST (UTC+2) | Barbarić (yellow card) 24'; Govedarica (yellow card) 70'; Kunić (yellow card) 90+2' | Report | Lazić (yellow card) 45+1'; Hebibović (red card) 65'; Ćosić (yellow card) 68'; Šerbečić (yellow card) 75'; Rahmanović (yellow card) 90+2' | Stadium: Stadion pod Bijelim Brijegom; Attendance: 3,000; Referee: Miloš Gigović (Gradiška) |

| 18 October 2019 13 | Sarajevo | 2–0 | Čelik | Sarajevo |
| 18:00 CEST (UTC+2) | Rahmanović 60'; Đokanović (yellow card) 67'; Ahmetović 85' | Report | Blažević (yellow card) 17'; Jamak (yellow card) 43'; Perišić (red card) 57'; Mahmutović (yellow card) 58'; Pecelj (yellow card) 61'; Pavlović (yellow card) 76'; Okić (yellow card) 85' | Stadium: Asim Ferhatović Hase Stadium; Attendance: 3,500; Referee: Frano Jelić (Široki Brijeg) |

| 27 October 2019 14 | Sloboda Tuzla | 1–1 | Sarajevo | Tuzla |
| 14:30 CET (UTC+1) | Jusić (yellow card) 36'; Bekić (yellow card) 45'; Bekrić 57'; Maksimović (yellow card) 87'; Uzelac (yellow card) 89' | Report | Rahmanović 11'; Gavrić (yellow card) 37'; Lazić (yellow card) 60' | Stadium: Tušanj City Stadium; Attendance: 3,500; Referee: Luka Bilbija (Prijedor) |

| 2 November 2019 15 | Sarajevo | 3–0 | Široki Brijeg | Sarajevo |
| 17:00 CET (UTC+1) | Rahmanović (yellow card) 7'; Ahmetović 12', 26', 63'; Tatar (yellow card) 45'; Gavrić (yellow card) 78'; Lazić (yellow card) 82' | Report | Stanić (yellow card) 6'; Cipetić (yellow card) 14'; Hrkać (yellow card) 15'; Ćorić (yellow card) 39'; Yenin (yellow card) 56'; Z. Vukoja (yellow card) 83' | Stadium: Asim Ferhatović Hase Stadium; Attendance: 4,500; Referee: Zoran Grbić (Prijedor) |

| 9 November 2019 16 | Radnik | 1–1 | Sarajevo | Bijeljina |
| 13:30 CET (UTC+1) | Simonović (yellow card) 75'; Bradonjić 81'; Popara (yellow card) 87' | Report | Oremuš (yellow card) 9'; Lazić (yellow card) 22'; Simonović 46' (o.g.); Đokanović (yellow card) 59'; Velkoski (yellow card) 63'; Hebibović (yellow card) 74'; Stanojević (yellow card) 90+3' | Stadium: Gradski stadion Attendance: 700; Referee: Elvis Mujić (Banovići) |

| 23 November 2019 17 | Velež | 1–2 | Sarajevo | Mostar |
| 13:00 CET (UTC+1) | Čivić 62'; Urdinov (yellow card) 64' | Report | Velkoski 13'; Hodžić (yellow card) 15'; Tatar 59' (pen.); Rahmanović (yellow card) 64'; Šabanović (yellow card) 87' (yellow-red card) 88' | Stadium: Stadion Rođeni; Attendance: 2,500; Referee: Dragan Petrović (Banja Luka) |

| 30 November 2019 18 | Sarajevo | 1–3 | Željezničar | Sarajevo |
| 16:00 CET (UTC+1) | Oremuš (yellow card) 8'; Ahmetović 12'; Rahmanović (yellow card) 16'; Lazić (yellow card) 28'; Hodžić (yellow card) 70'; Šerbečić (yellow card) 75' (yellow-red card) 88'; Tatar (yellow card) 78'; Letić (yellow card) 90+2' | Report | Sipović (yellow card) 21'; Adnan Gušo (red card) 28'; Štilić 30', 70' (pen.), (yellow card) 49'; Alispahić (yellow card) 34'; Ramović (yellow card) 42'; Osmanković (yellow card) 45+4'; Stevanović (yellow card) 45+4'; Krpić 46'; Stanić (yellow card) 64'; Bojo (yellow card) 90+5' | Stadium: Asim Ferhatović Hase Stadium; Attendance: 15,000; Referee: Haris Kaljanac (Sarajevo) |
Note: Sarajevo manager Husref Musemić was cautioned (yellow card) in the 45th minute.

| 7 December 2019 19 | Zvijezda 09 | 1–1 | Sarajevo | Ugljevik |
| 13:00 CET (UTC+1) | Đelmić 47' | Report | Oremuš (yellow card) 30'; Stanojević (yellow card) 69'; Ahmetović 77' (pen.); Dupovac (yellow card) 85'; Handžić (yellow card) 85' | Stadium: Ugljevik City Stadium; Attendance: 300; Referee: Zoran Grbić (Prijedor) |

| 22 February 2020 20 | Sarajevo | 6–2 | Tuzla City | Sarajevo |
| 17:30 CET (UTC+1) | Ahmetović 40', 48', 73'; Dupovac (yellow card) 42'; Hodžić 45+1'; Tatar 54'; Sušić 86' (pen.) | Report | Hadžanović (yellow card) 8'; Šarčević 16'; Leković (yellow card) 42'; Badji (red card); Hasanović (yellow card) 45+2', (goal) 64' | Stadium: Asim Ferhatović Hase Stadium; Attendance: 6,000; Referee: Zoran Grbić (Prijedor) |

| 29 February 2020 21 | Borac | 0–2 | Sarajevo | Banja Luka |
| 16:30 CET (UTC+1) | Mirić (yellow card) 14'; Danilović (yellow card) 59'; Kajkut (yellow card) 59' | Report | Tatar 42', 71'; Šerbečić (yellow card) 50'; Sušić (yellow card) 88' | Stadium: Banja Luka City Stadium; Attendance: 8,000; Referee: Vladimir Bjelica (East Sarajevo) |

| 7 March 2020 22 | Sarajevo | 2–1 | Mladost Doboj Kakanj | Sarajevo |
| 18:00 CET (UTC+1) | Miličević 42'; Mustedanagić (yellow card) 71'; Tatar 86', (yellow card) 86'; Rahmanović (yellow card) 89' | Report | Sadiku (yellow card) 14'; Mirkov (yellow card) 38'; Vazda 43'; Nikolić (yellow card) 65'; Velić (yellow card) 76'; Hiroš (yellow card) 90' | Stadium: Asim Ferhatović Hase Stadium; Attendance: 3,000; Referee: Dragan Petrović (Banja Luka) |

=== Cup of Bosnia and Herzegovina ===
==== Round of 32 ====
| 18 September 2018 | Ljubuški | 2–4 | Sarajevo | Ljubuški |
| 16:30 CEST (UTC+2) | Buhač 11'; Brkić (yellow card) 20', (goal) 27'; Bošnjak (yellow card) 66' | Report | Salčin 24'; Hodžić (yellow card) 40'; Rahmanović (yellow card) 52'; Dupovac 64'; Guzina 79'; Šišić 87'; Sabljica (yellow card) 90+3' | Stadium: Babovac Stadium; Attendance: 1,100; Referee: Josip Martinović (Čapljina) |

==== Round of 16 ====
| 2 October 2019 | Široki Brijeg | 3–2 | Sarajevo | Široki Brijeg |
| 18:30 CEST (UTC+2) | Ćorić 30'; Barišić (yellow card) 45'; Kovačić 75', (yellow card) 82'; Yenin 76'; Mašić (yellow card) 81'; Franjić (red card) 85'; Matić (yellow card) 90+3' | Report | Šabanović 37'; Gavrić (yellow card) 43'; Dupovac (yellow card) 45+3'; Handžić (yellow card) 56'; Hebibović 59', (yellow card) 80'; Šerbečić (yellow card) 62'; Letić (yellow card) 74'; Rahmanović (yellow card) 81'; Šarić (red card) 87'; Hodžić (yellow card) 87' | Stadium: Pecara Stadium; Attendance: 2,200; Referee: Elvis Mujić (Banovići) |

=== UEFA Champions League ===
Sarajevo entered the UEFA Champions League at the first qualifying round.

==== First qualifying round ====
On 18 June, Sarajevo were drawn to face Celtic (Scotland) in the First qualifying round of the UEFA Champions League.

| 9 July 2019 First Leg | Sarajevo (Bosnia and Herzegovina) | 1–3 | (Scotland) Celtic | Sarajevo, Bosnia and Herzegovina |
| 19:45 CEST (UTC+2) | Lazić (yellow card) 9'; Oremuš 29'; Velkoski (yellow card) 32'; Hodžić (yellow card) 59'; Ahmetović (yellow card) 66' | Report | Johnston 35'; Édouard 51'; Ajer (yellow card) 83'; Sinclair 85' | Stadium: Asim Ferhatović Hase Stadium; Attendance: 24,620; Referee: Glenn Nyberg (Sweden) |

| 17 July 2019 Second Leg | Celtic (Scotland) | 2–1 (5–2 agg.) | (Bosnia and Herzegovina) Sarajevo | Glasgow, Scotland |
| 19:45 BST (UTC+1) | Christie 26'; McGregor 75' | Report | Oremuš (yellow card) 39'; Milanović (yellow card) 57'; Tatar (yellow card) 42', (goal) 63'; Velkoski (yellow card) 70'; Šerbečić (yellow card) 73' | Stadium: Celtic Park; Attendance: 58,662; Referee: Alain Durieux (Luxembourg) |

=== UEFA Europa League ===
During the draw on 18 June, the loser of the match Sarajevo-Celtic was drawn to directly enter the UEFA Europa League third qualifying round.

==== Third qualifying round ====
| 8 August 2019 First Leg | Sarajevo (Bosnia and Herzegovina) | 1–2 | (Belarus) BATE Borisov | Zenica, Bosnia and Herzegovina |
| 19:45 CEST (UTC+2) | Hebibović (yellow card) 42'; Lazić (yellow card) 70'; Handžić 89' | Report | Baha 19'; Moukam 71' (pen.) | Stadium: Bilino Polje Stadium; Attendance: 7,124; Referee: Alexandre Boucaut (Belgium) |

| 15 August 2019 Second Leg | BATE Borisov (Belarus) | 0–0 (2–1 agg.) | (Bosnia and Herzegovina) Sarajevo | Barysaw, Belarus |
| 20:00 MSK (UTC+3) | Dragun (yellow card) 81'; Tuominen (yellow card) 90+1' | Report | Đokanović (yellow card) 1'; Gavrić (yellow card) 30'; Mustafić (yellow card) 45'; Šišić (yellow card) 79'; Velkoski (yellow card) 90+1'; Hebibović (yellow card) 90+1' | Stadium: Borisov Arena; Attendance: 11,876; Referee: Kevin Blom (Netherlands) |

== Statistics ==
=== Squad appearances and goals ===
| No. | Pos | Nat | Player | Total | | Premier League | | Cup of BiH | | Champions League | | Europa League | |
| No. | Pos | Nat | Player | Apps | Goals | Apps | Goals | Apps | Goals | Apps | Goals | Apps | Goals |
Goalkeepers
| 13 | GK | (Bosnia and Herzegovina) BIH | Vladan Kovačević | 25 | 0 | 20 | 0 | 1 | 0 | 2 | 0 | 2 | 0 |
| 16 | GK | (Slovenia) SVN | Elvis Džafić | 2 | 0 | 2 | 0 | 0 | 0 | 0 | 0 | 0 | 0 |
| 35 | GK | (Bosnia and Herzegovina) BIH | Belmin Dizdarević | 1 | 0 | 0 | 0 | 1 | 0 | 0 | 0 | 0 | 0 |
| 44 | GK | (Croatia) CRO | Matej Marković | 0 | 0 | 0 | 0 | 0 | 0 | 0 | 0 | 0 | 0 |
Defenders
| 2 | DF | (Bosnia and Herzegovina) BIH | Dušan Hodžić | 19 | 1 | 11+4 | 1 | 2 | 0 | 2 | 0 | 0 | 0 |
| 3 | DF | (Bosnia and Herzegovina) BIH | Selmir Pidro | 0 | 0 | 0 | 0 | 0 | 0 | 0 | 0 | 0 | 0 |
| 4 | DF | (Bosnia and Herzegovina) BIH | Halid Šabanović | 16 | 1 | 11+2 | 0 | 2 | 1 | 1 | 0 | 0 | 0 |
| 6 | DF | (Serbia) SRB | Darko Lazić | 20 | 0 | 15 | 0 | 1 | 0 | 2 | 0 | 2 | 0 |
| 15 | DF | (Croatia) CRO | Hrvoje Miličević | 3 | 1 | 3 | 1 | 0 | 0 | 0 | 0 | 0 | 0 |
| 22 | DF | (Bosnia and Herzegovina) BIH | Bojan Letić | 16 | 0 | 12+1 | 0 | 1 | 0 | 0 | 0 | 2 | 0 |
| 24 | DF | (Bosnia and Herzegovina) BIH | Andrej Đokanović | 23 | 0 | 13+4 | 0 | 2 | 0 | 0+2 | 0 | 2 | 0 |
| 25 | DF | (Bosnia and Herzegovina) BIH | Besim Šerbečić | 25 | 2 | 20 | 2 | 1 | 0 | 2 | 0 | 2 | 0 |
| 27 | DF | (Bosnia and Herzegovina) BIH | Numan Kurdić | 3 | 0 | 2+1 | 0 | 0 | 0 | 0 | 0 | 0 | 0 |
| 29 | DF | (Bosnia and Herzegovina) BIH | Amer Dupovac | 6 | 1 | 5 | 0 | 1 | 1 | 0 | 0 | 0 | 0 |
| 31 | DF | (Bosnia and Herzegovina) BIH | Mufid Salčinović | 0 | 0 | 0 | 0 | 0 | 0 | 0 | 0 | 0 | 0 |
| 40 | DF | (Bosnia and Herzegovina) BIH | Armin Imamović | 0 | 0 | 0 | 0 | 0 | 0 | 0 | 0 | 0 | 0 |
| 50 | DF | (Bosnia and Herzegovina) BIH | Dino Islamović | 0 | 0 | 0 | 0 | 0 | 0 | 0 | 0 | 0 | 0 |
Midfielders
| 5 | MF | (Serbia) SRB | Miloš Stanojević | 6 | 0 | 0+6 | 0 | 0 | 0 | 0 | 0 | 0 | 0 |
| 7 | MF | (Bosnia and Herzegovina) BIH | Anel Hebibović | 20 | 4 | 15 | 3 | 1 | 1 | 2 | 0 | 2 | 0 |
| 8 | MF | (Serbia) SRB | Nebojša Gavrić | 19 | 0 | 15+1 | 0 | 1 | 0 | 0 | 0 | 2 | 0 |
| 10 | MF | (Bosnia and Herzegovina) BIH | Amar Rahmanović | 16 | 3 | 8+4 | 3 | 1+1 | 0 | 2 | 0 | 0 | 0 |
| 14 | MF | (Bosnia and Herzegovina) BIH | Amar Sabljica | 1 | 0 | 0 | 0 | 1 | 0 | 0 | 0 | 0 | 0 |
| 17 | MF | (Bosnia and Herzegovina) BIH | Aladin Šišić | 13 | 1 | 3+5 | 0 | 1 | 1 | 0+2 | 0 | 1+1 | 0 |
| 19 | MF | (Bosnia and Herzegovina) BIH | Amar Jašarević | 1 | 0 | 0 | 0 | 1 | 0 | 0 | 0 | 0 | 0 |
| 20 | MF | (Bosnia and Herzegovina) BIH | Đani Salčin | 4 | 1 | 3 | 0 | 1 | 1 | 0 | 0 | 0 | 0 |
| 22 | MF | (Bosnia and Herzegovina) BIH | Ivan Jukić | 3 | 0 | 3 | 0 | 0 | 0 | 0 | 0 | 0 | 0 |
| 23 | MF | (Bosnia and Herzegovina) BIH | Alen Mustafić | 9 | 1 | 5+2 | 1 | 0 | 0 | 0 | 0 | 0+2 | 0 |
| 23 | MF | (Bosnia and Herzegovina) BIH | Zinedin Mustedanagić | 2 | 0 | 0+2 | 0 | 0 | 0 | 0 | 0 | 0 | 0 |
| 31 | MF | (Bosnia and Herzegovina) BIH | Tino-Sven Sušić | 2 | 1 | 1+1 | 1 | 0 | 0 | 0 | 0 | 0 | 0 |
| 45 | MF | (Croatia) CRO | Mirko Oremuš | 10 | 1 | 6+2 | 0 | 0 | 0 | 2 | 1 | 0 | 0 |
Forwards
| 9 | FW | (Bosnia and Herzegovina) BIH | Mersudin Ahmetović | 24 | 13 | 20+1 | 13 | 0 | 0 | 2 | 0 | 0+1 | 0 |
| 11 | FW | (North Macedonia) MKD | Krste Velkoski | 24 | 2 | 14+5 | 2 | 1 | 0 | 2 | 0 | 2 | 0 |
| 15 | FW | (Bosnia and Herzegovina) BIH | Kenan Dervišagić | 0 | 0 | 0 | 0 | 0 | 0 | 0 | 0 | 0 | 0 |
| 21 | FW | (Bosnia and Herzegovina) BIH | Slobodan Milanović | 22 | 1 | 15+2 | 1 | 1 | 0 | 2 | 0 | 1+1 | 0 |
| 26 | FW | (Bosnia and Herzegovina) BIH | Gedeon Guzina | 13 | 1 | 5+5 | 0 | 1 | 1 | 0+1 | 0 | 0+1 | 0 |
| 28 | FW | (Bosnia and Herzegovina) BIH | Haris Handžić | 15 | 3 | 4+7 | 2 | 2 | 0 | 0 | 0 | 2 | 1 |
| 32 | FW | (Bosnia and Herzegovina) BIH | Benjamin Tatar | 22 | 7 | 15+2 | 6 | 0+1 | 0 | 1+1 | 1 | 2 | 0 |
| 37 | FW | (Brazil) BRA | Nathan | 4 | 0 | 0+3 | 0 | 1 | 0 | 0 | 0 | 0 | 0 |

Number after the "+" sign represents the number of games player started the game on the bench and was substituted on.

=== Goalscorers ===
| Rank | No. | Pos. | Name | Premier League | Cup of BiH | Champions League | Europa League | Total |
|---|---|---|---|---|---|---|---|---|
| 1 | 9 | FW | (Bosnia and Herzegovina) Mersudin Ahmetović | 13 | 0 | 0 | 0 | 13 |
| 2 | 32 | FW | (Bosnia and Herzegovina) Benjamin Tatar | 6 | 0 | 1 | 0 | 7 |
| 3 | 7 | MF | (Bosnia and Herzegovina) Anel Hebibović | 3 | 1 | 0 | 0 | 4 |
| 4 | 10 | MF | (Bosnia and Herzegovina) Amar Rahmanović | 3 | 0 | 0 | 0 | 3 |
| 4 | 28 | FW | (Bosnia and Herzegovina) Haris Handžić | 2 | 0 | 0 | 1 | 3 |
| 5 | 25 | DF | (Bosnia and Herzegovina) Besim Šerbečić | 2 | 0 | 0 | 0 | 2 |
| 5 | 11 | FW | (North Macedonia) Krste Velkoski | 2 | 0 | 0 | 0 | 2 |
| 6 | 15 | DF | (Croatia) Hrvoje Miličević | 1 | 0 | 0 | 0 | 1 |
| 6 | 29 | DF | (Bosnia and Herzegovina) Amer Dupovac | 0 | 1 | 0 | 0 | 1 |
| 6 | 26 | FW | (Bosnia and Herzegovina) Gedeon Guzina | 0 | 1 | 0 | 0 | 1 |
| 6 | 21 | FW | (Bosnia and Herzegovina) Slobodan Milanović | 1 | 0 | 0 | 0 | 1 |
| 6 | 23 | MF | (Bosnia and Herzegovina) Alen Mustafić | 1 | 0 | 0 | 0 | 1 |
| 6 | 45 | MF | (Croatia) Mirko Oremuš | 0 | 0 | 1 | 0 | 1 |
| 6 | 20 | MF | (Bosnia and Herzegovina) Đani Salčin | 0 | 1 | 0 | 0 | 1 |
| 6 | 17 | MF | (Bosnia and Herzegovina) Aladin Šišić | 0 | 1 | 0 | 0 | 1 |
| 6 | 4 | DF | (Bosnia and Herzegovina) Halid Šabanović | 0 | 1 | 0 | 0 | 1 |
| 6 | 2 | DF | (Serbia) Dušan Hodžić | 1 | 0 | 0 | 0 | 1 |
| 6 | 31 | MF | (Bosnia and Herzegovina) Tino-Sven Sušić | 1 | 0 | 0 | 0 | 1 |
| Own goals | | | | 2 | 0 | 0 | 0 | 2 |
| TOTAL | | | | 38 | 6 | 2 | 1 | 47 |

=== Hat-tricks ===
| Player | Against | Result | Date | Competition | Ref |
|---|---|---|---|---|---|
| (Bosnia and Herzegovina) Mersudin Ahmetović | (Bosnia and Herzegovina) Široki Brijeg | 3–0 (H) | 2 November 2019 | Premier League | |
| (Bosnia and Herzegovina) Mersudin Ahmetović | (Bosnia and Herzegovina) FK Tuzla City | 6–2 (H) | 22 February 2020 | Premier League | |

(H) – Home; (A) – Away

=== Clean sheets ===
| Rank | No. | Name | Premier League | Cup of Bosnia | Champions League | Europa League | Total |
|---|---|---|---|---|---|---|---|
| 1 | 13 | (Bosnia and Herzegovina) Vladan Kovačević | 11 | 0 | 0 | 1 | 12 |
| Total | | | 11 | 0 | 0 | 1 | 12 |
