= Anel Hebibović =

Bosnian footballer (born 1990)

Personal information
- Date of birth: 7 July 1990 (age 36)
- Place of birth: Konjic, SFR Yugoslavia
- Height: 1.73 m (5 ft 8 in)
- Position: Winger

Team information
- Current team: Igman Konjic
- Number: 7

Youth career
- 2000–2008: Igman Konjic

Senior career*
Years	Team	Apps	(Gls)
2008–2009	Igman Konjic	11	(1)
2009–2010	GOŠK Gabela	17	(5)
2010–2012	Igman Konjic	29	(6)
2012–2015	Velež Mostar	85	(15)
2015–2022	Sarajevo	145	(22)
2016	→ Olimpik (loan)	12	(4)
2022–	Igman Konjic	114	(19)
- * Club domestic league appearances and goals as of 12 June 2026

Anel Hebibović (born 7 July 1990) is a Bosnian professional footballer who plays as a winger for First League of FBiH club Igman Konjic.

== Career statistics ==
=== Club ===
As of match played 7 June 2026

Club	Season	League			Bosnian Cup		Continental		Total	
Club	Season	Division	Apps	Goals	Apps	Goals	Apps	Goals	Apps	Goals
Velež Mostar	2011–12	Bosnian Premier League	4	0	—		—		4	0
Velež Mostar	2012–13	Bosnian Premier League	26	4	3	1	—		29	5
Velež Mostar	2013–14	Bosnian Premier League	30	5	4	0	—		34	5
Velež Mostar	2014–15	Bosnian Premier League	25	6	5	7	—		30	13
Velež Mostar	Total		85	15	12	8	—		97	23
Sarajevo	2015–16	Bosnian Premier League	7	1	3	0	2 (Note: Appearances in UEFA Champions League)	0	12	1
Sarajevo	2016–17	Bosnian Premier League	27	6	9	2	—		36	8
Sarajevo	2017–18	Bosnian Premier League	26	3	1	0	2 (Note: Appearances in UEFA Europa League)	1	29	4
Sarajevo	2018–19	Bosnian Premier League	27	5	5	0	4	0	36	5
Sarajevo	2019–20	Bosnian Premier League	15	3	1	1	4 (Note: Two appearances in UEFA Champions League, two appearances in UEFA Europa League)	0	20	4
Sarajevo	2020–21	Bosnian Premier League	19	2	5	3	0	0	24	5
Sarajevo	2021–22	Bosnian Premier League	24	2	5	1	1 (Note: Appearance in UEFA Europa Conference League)	0	30	3
Sarajevo	Total		145	22	29	7	13	1	187	30
Olimpic (loan)	2015–16	Bosnian Premier League	12	4	—		—		12	4
Igman Konjic	2022–23	Bosnian Premier League	27	1	0	0	—		27	1
Igman Konjic	2023–24	Bosnian Premier League	31	8	2	0	—		33	8
Igman Konjic	2024–25	Bosnian Premier League	30	4	1	0	—		31	4
Igman Konjic	2025–26	First League of FBiH	26	6	—		—		26	6
Igman Konjic	Total		114	19	3	0	—		117	19
Career total			356	60	44	15	13	1	413	76

== Honours ==
Igman Konjic

- Second League of FBiH: 2008–09 (South)

Sarajevo

- Bosnian Premier League: 2018–19, 2019–20
- Bosnian Cup: 2018–19, 2020–21
