= Miloš Stanojević (footballer) =

Serbian footballer

Personal information
- Full name: Miloš Stanojević
- Date of birth: 20 November 1993 (age 32)
- Place of birth: Valjevo, FR Yugoslavia
- Height: 1.87 m (6 ft 2 in)
- Position: Midfielder

Senior career*
Years	Team	Apps	(Gls)
2010–2011	Radnički Obrenovac	29	(1)
2012	Srem Jakovo	5	(0)
2012–2014	Rad	34	(1)
2012	→ BASK (loan)	7	(1)
2014–2015	Napredak Kruševac	18	(0)
2015–2016	Mladost Lučani	19	(0)
2016–2017	Radnički Niš	24	(0)
2017–2020	Sarajevo	55	(2)
2020–2021	Ankaragücü	3	(0)
2020–2021	→ Ankaraspor (loan)	10	(0)
2021–2022	Caspiy	7	(0)
2022	Kolubara	0	(0)
2022–2023	Leotar	17	(0)
2023–2024	Jedinstvo	13	(0)

International career
2016	Serbia	1	(0)
- * Club domestic league appearances and goals as of 26 December 2023

Miloš Stanojević (Serbian Cyrillic: Милош Станојевић; born 20 November 1993) is a Serbian professional footballer who most recently played as a midfielder for Jedinstvo.

== International career ==
Stanojević made his international debut for the Serbian B team in a friendly 3–0 loss to Qatar.

== Career statistics ==
=== Club ===
As of match played 7 December 2019

Club	Season	League			Cup		Continental		Total	
Club	Season	Division	Apps	Goals	Apps	Goals	Apps	Goals	Apps	Goals
Sarajevo	2017–18	Bosnian Premier League	24	0	1	0	—		25	0
Sarajevo	2018–19	Bosnian Premier League	25	2	4	0	4	0	33	2
Sarajevo	2019–20	Bosnian Premier League	6	0	0	0	0	0	6	0
Sarajevo	Total		55	2	5	0	4	0	64	2
Ankaragücü	2019–20	Süper Lig	0	0	—		—		0	0
Career total			55	2	5	0	4	0	64	2

== Honours ==
Sarajevo

- Bosnian Premier League: 2018–19
- Bosnian Cup: 2018–19
