= Benjamin Tatar (footballer) =

Bosnian footballer

Personal information
- Date of birth: 18 May 1994 (age 32)
- Place of birth: Sarajevo, Bosnia and Herzegovina
- Height: 1.80 m (5 ft 11 in)
- Positions: Forward; midfielder

Team information
- Current team: Velež Mostar
- Number: 32

Youth career
- Turbina Jablanica
- –2011: Radnik Hadžići

Senior career*
Years	Team	Apps	(Gls)
2011–2012	Radnik Hadžići	25	(6)
2012–2014	Novigrad	47	(8)
2014–2015	Cibalia	0	(0)
2014–2015	→ Novigrad (loan)	29	(12)
2015	Novigrad	14	(3)
2016–2017	Gorica	44	(20)
2017–2018	Slaven Belupo	11	(0)
2018–2021	Sarajevo	64	(28)
2021	Abha	10	(1)
2021–2022	Qadsia	13	(4)
2022–2023	Borac Banja Luka	29	(1)
2023	Okzhetpes	5	(0)
2024	Gnistan	28	(3)
2025–2026	Sloga Doboj	41	(4)
2026–	Velež Mostar	1	(0)

International career
2020	Bosnia and Herzegovina	4	(0)
- * Club domestic league appearances and goals as of 9 October 2026

Benjamin Tatar (born 18 May 1994) is a Bosnian professional footballer who plays as a forward or midfielder for Bosnian Premier League club Velež Mostar.

== International career ==
In September 2020, Tatar was called up to represent the Bosnia and Herzegovina national team, for UEFA Euro 2020 qualifying play-offs against Northern Ireland and UEFA Nations League games against Netherlands and Poland. He debuted in a home draw against the Netherlands on 11 October 2020.

== Personal life ==
Tatar's younger brother Kerim is also a professional footballer who plays as a winger for First League of FBiH club Goražde.

== Career statistics ==
=== Club ===
As of match played 9 October 2026

Appearances and goals by club, season and competition
Club	Season	League			National cup (Note: Includes Croatian Cup, Bosnian Cup, Suomen Cup)		Continental		Total	
Club	Season	Division	Apps	Goals	Apps	Goals	Apps	Goals	Apps	Goals
Radnik Hadžići	2011–12	Second League of FBiH	25	6	—		—		25	6
Novigrad	2012–13	3. HNL	22	3	—		—		22	3
Novigrad	2013–14	3. HNL	25	5	3	2	—		28	7
Novigrad	2014–15	3. HNL	29	12	3	2	—		32	14
Novigrad	2015–16	3. HNL	14	3	—		—		14	3
Novigrad	Total		90	23	6	4	—		96	27
Gorica	2015–16	2. HNL	14	7	—		—		14	7
Gorica	2016–17	2. HNL	32	13	1	1	—		33	14
Gorica	Total		46	20	1	1	—		47	21
Slaven Belupo	2017–18	1. HNL	11	0	2	0	—		13	0
Sarajevo	2018–19	Bosnian Premier League	30	12	5	1	2 (Note: Appearances in UEFA Europa League)	0	37	13
Sarajevo	2019–20	Bosnian Premier League	17	6	1	0	4 (Note: Two appearances and one goal in UEFA Champions League, two appearances in UEFA Europa League)	1	22	7
Sarajevo	2020–21	Bosnian Premier League	17	10	1	0	4 (Note: Two appearances and two goals in UEFA Champions League, two appearances and one goal in UEFA Europa League)	3	22	13
Sarajevo	Total		64	28	7	1	10	4	81	33
Abha	2020–21	Saudi Pro League	10	1	—		—		10	1
Al Qadsia	2021–22	Kuwaiti Premier League	13	4	—		—		13	4
Borac Banja Luka	2022–23	Bosnian Premier League	29	1	1	0	2 (Note: Appearances in UEFA Europa Conference League)	2	32	3
Okzhetpes	2023	Kazakhstan Premier League	5	0	—		—		5	0
Gnistan	2024	Veikkausliiga	28	3	2	2	—		30	5
Sloga Doboj	2024–25	Bosnian Premier League	12	0	1	0	—		13	0
Sloga Doboj	2025–26	Bosnian Premier League	29	4	5	2	—		34	6
Sloga Doboj	Total		41	4	6	2	—		47	6
Velež Mostar	2026–27	Bosnian Premier League	1	0	0	0	—		1	0
Career total			363	90	25	10	12	6	400	106

=== International ===
Appearances and goals by national team and year
National team	Year	Apps	Goals
Bosnia and Herzegovina
Bosnia and Herzegovina	2020	4	0
Total		4	0

== Honours ==
Sarajevo

- Bosnian Premier League: 2018–19, 2019–20
- Bosnian Cup: 2018–19

Individual

- 2. HNL Top Goalscorer: 2016–17 (13 goals)
