= Slađan Nikodijević =

Serbian footballer (born 1990)

Slađan Nikodijevic
Personal information
- Date of birth: 1 May 1990 (age 36)
- Place of birth: Paris, France
- Height: 1.90 m (6 ft 3 in)
- Position: Forward

Senior career*
Years	Team	Apps	(Gls)
2006–2009	Radnički Svilajnac		
2006–2007	→ Morava Velika Plana (loan)	7	(0)
2010–2012	Borac Čačak	32	(3)
2013	Radnički Svilajnac	15	(8)
2013–2014	Carrarese	10	(1)
2014	Donji Srem	3	(0)
2014–2015	Metalac Gornji Milanovac	17	(3)
2015	Radnički Svilajnac	9	(6)
2016	Bačka	9	(0)
2016	ČSK Čelarevo	15	(5)
2017–2018	Inđija	36	(15)
2018–2019	Radnički Niš	26	(4)
2019–2021	Radnički 1923	58	(16)
- * Club domestic league appearances and goals as of 19 May 2021

Slađan Nikodijević (Serbian Cyrillic: Слађан Никодијевић; born 1 May 1990) is a Serbian footballer who plays as a forward.

He is the younger brother of Saša Nikodijević.
