= Joachim Adukor =

Liberian footballer (born 1993)

Personal information
- Date of birth: 2 May 1993 (age 33)
- Place of birth: Tema, Ghana
- Height: 6 ft 1 in (1.85 m)
- Position: Central midfielder

Team information
- Current team: Sliema Wanderers
- Number: 25

Youth career
- 2001–2010: Parma (Ghana)
- 2010–2011: Emirates Sporting Club

Senior career*
Years	Team	Apps	(Gls)
2011	→ Gefle (loan)	0	(0)
2012–2013	Gefle	11	(0)
2014–2015	Trofense	12	(0)
2015–2016	Béziers	23	(0)
2016–2017	OFI	17	(1)
2017–2019	Sarajevo	35	(3)
2019–2020	Diósgyőr	7	(0)
2020–2021	Sarajevo	21	(0)
2021–2022	Aktobe	26	(1)
2023–	Sliema Wanderers	11	(2)

International career^{‡}
2022–	Liberia	3	(0)
- * Club domestic league appearances and goals as of 13 May 2024 ‡ National team caps and goals as of 16:21; 29 September 2022 (UTC)

Joachim Adukor (born 2 May 1993) is a professional footballer who plays as a central midfielder for Maltese Premier League club Sliema Wanderers. Born in Ghana, he plays for the Liberia national team.

== Club career ==
Adukor plays as a central midfielder. He previously played for Gefle in the Swedish Allsvenskan, for Trofense in the Portuguese Segunda Liga, Béziers in France and OFI in the Football League Greece.

On 15 August 2017, Adukor signed with Bosnian Premier League club Sarajevo. In the 2018–19 season, Adukor won the double with Sarajevo, winning both the Bosnian Premier League and the Bosnian Cup. He left Sarajevo in June 2019 after his contract with the club expired.

Shortly after leaving Sarajevo, on 1 July 2019, Adukor signed a contract with Hungarian Nemzeti Bajnokság I club Diósgyőri. Only one year later, on 8 September 2020, he came back to Sarajevo, signing a two-year contract. Adukor played his first game for Sarajevo since his return in a cup match against Radnički Lukavac on 13 October 2020.

== International career ==
In October 2011, Adukor expressed his wish to link up with the Ghana under-20 national team ahead of the 2013 African U20 Championship. In June 2012, he was selected to join the squad for the forthcoming qualification campaign.

In May 2015, Adukor was invited to join the Ghana under-23 side for qualifiers for the All-Africa Games and the Olympic Games.

In June 2022 Adukor switched allegiances to represent Liberia internationally. He debuted for Liberia in 2023 Africa Cup of Nations qualifiers on 13 June 2022 playing whole 90 minutes in a loss to Morocco.

== Career statistics ==
=== Club ===
As of match played 26 May 2021.

Club	Season	League	League		Cup		Continental		Total	
Club	Season	League	Apps	Goals	Apps	Goals	Apps	Goals	Apps	Goals
Gefle	2011	Allsvenskan	0	0	0	0	—		0	0
Gefle	2012	Allsvenskan	3	0	1	0	—		4	0
Gefle	2013	Allsvenskan	8	0	1	0	3	0	12	0
Gefle	Total		11	0	2	0	3	0	16	0
Trofense	2014–15	LigaPro	12	0	4	1	—		16	1
Béziers	2015–16	Championnat National	23	0	1	0	—		24	0
OFI	2016–17	Football League Greece	17	1	5	0	—		22	1
Sarajevo	2017–18	Bosnian Premier League	20	2	0	0	0	0	20	2
Sarajevo	2018–19	Bosnian Premier League	15	1	0	0	4	0	19	1
Sarajevo	Total		35	3	0	0	4	0	39	3
Diósgyőri	2019–20	Nemzeti Bajnokság I	7	0	0	0	—		7	0
Sarajevo	2020–21	Bosnian Premier League	15	0	6	0	0	0	21	0
Career total			120	4	18	1	7	0	145	5

== Honors ==
Sarajevo

- Bosnian Premier League: 2018–19
- Bosnian Cup: 2018–19, 2020–21
