= Amar Jašarević =

Bosnian footballer

Personal information
- Date of birth: 27 May 2001 (age 25)
- Place of birth: Sarajevo, Bosnia and Herzegovina
- Height: 1.69 m (5 ft 7 in)
- Position: Midfielder

Team information
- Current team: Radnik Hadžići
- Number: 11

Youth career
- –2020: Sarajevo

Senior career*
Years	Team	Apps	(Gls)
2019–2021	Sarajevo	0	(0)
2020–2021	→ Radnik Hadžići (loan)	27	(0)
2021–	Radnik Hadžići	67	(6)

International career^{‡}
2019	Bosnia and Herzegovina U18	2	(0)
2019	Bosnia and Herzegovina U19	8	(0)
- * Club domestic league appearances and goals as of 18 November 2023 ‡ National team caps and goals as of 6 June 2019

Amar Jašarević (born 27 May 2001) is a Bosnian professional footballer who plays as a midfielder for First League of FBiH club Radnik Hadžići.

== Club career ==
=== Sarajevo ===
In August 2018, after he passed all the youth categories, Jašarević signed a professional contract with Bosnian club Sarajevo. Jašarević made his debut in a cup match against Ljubuški 18 September 2019. He left the club in 2021 and signed for Radnik Hadžići.

== International career ==
Jašarević was a member of the Bosnia and Herzegovina national under-19 team. He has represented Bosnia and Herzegovina at all youth levels.

== Career statistics ==
=== Club ===
As of match played 29 November 2023

Appearances and goals by club, season and competition
Club	Season	League			National cup (Note: Appearance(s) in Bosnia and Herzegovina Football Cup)		Europe		Total	
Club	Season	League	Apps	Goals	Apps	Goals	Apps	Goals	Apps	Goals
Sarajevo	2019–20	Bosnian Premier League	0	0	1	0	–		1	0
Radnik Hadžići (loan)	2020–21	First League of FBiH	27	0	0	0	–		27	0
Radnik Hadžići	2021–22	First League of FBiH	27	1	0	0	—		27	1
Radnik Hadžići	2022–23	First League of FBiH	28	2	0	0	–		28	2
Radnik Hadžići	2023–24	First League of FBiH	12	3	1	0	–		13	3
Radnik Hadžići	Total		67	6	1	0	–		68	6
Career total			94	6	2	0	0	0	96	6
