= Emir Halilović =

Bosnian footballer

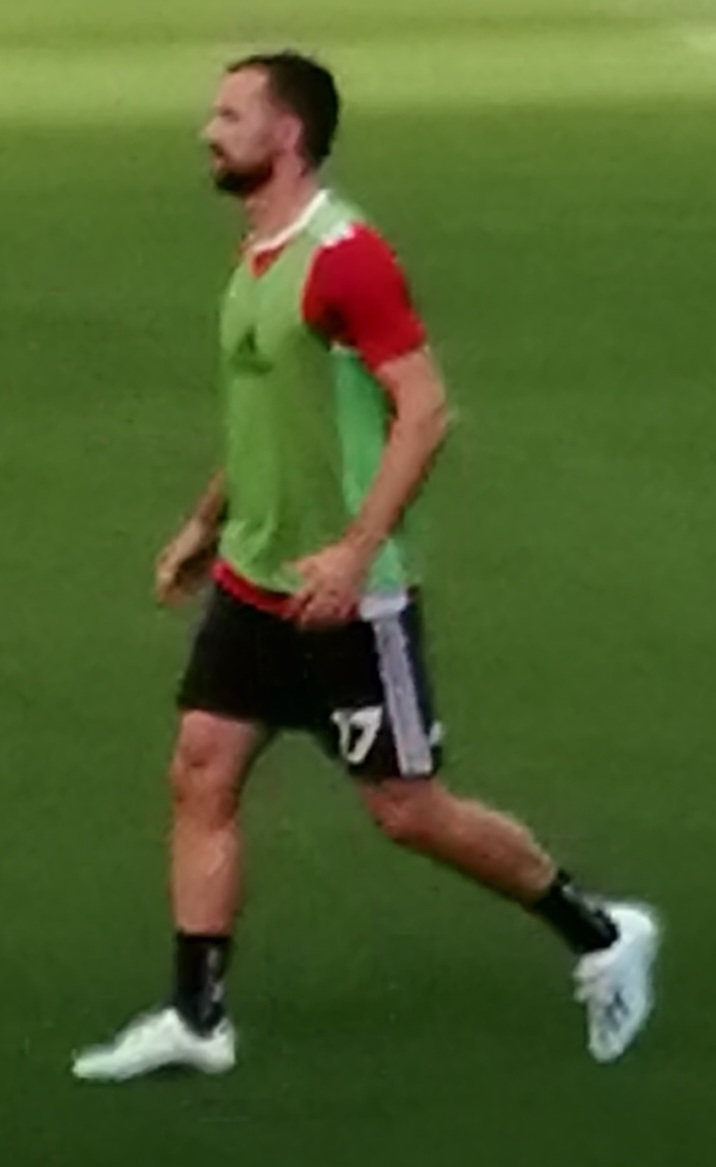
- Halilović with Spartak Trnava in 2019

Personal information
- Date of birth: 4 November 1989 (age 36)
- Place of birth: Banovići, SFR Yugoslavia
- Height: 1.78 m (5 ft 10 in)
- Position: Midfielder

Youth career
- Budućnost Banovići

Senior career*
Years	Team	Apps	(Gls)
2010–2011	Budućnost Banovići	19	(3)
2011–2012	Zvijezda Gradačac	27	(5)
2012–2015	Hradec Králové	56	(8)
2013	→ Převýšov (loan)		
2015–2017	Spartak Trnava	53	(6)
2017	Blau-Weiß Linz	12	(3)
2018–2019	Sarajevo	37	(4)
2019	Spartak Trnava	16	(2)
2020	Boluspor	13	(0)
2020–2021	Bandırmaspor	24	(1)
2021–2022	Zalaegerszeg	30	(1)
2022–2024	Velež Mostar	46	(2)
2024–2025	Tuzla City	25	(2)
2025–2026	Sloboda Tuzla	9	(0)
2026	Tuzla City	11	(1)
Total		378	(38)

International career
2011	Bosnia and Herzegovina B	1	(0)
- * Club domestic league appearances and goals

Emir Halilović (born 4 November 1989) is a former Bosnian professional footballer who played as a midfielder.

== Club career ==
On 18 June 2022, Halilović signed a two-year contract with Velež Mostar.

== International career ==
Halilović made his international debut for Bosnia and Herzegovina on 16 December 2011, in a 1–0 loss against Poland in a friendly match. It was an unofficial game though, between a Polish team of local league players and a Bosnian Olympic team.

== Career statistics ==
=== Club ===
As of match played 12 July 2020.

Club	Season	League			Cup		Continental		Total	
Club	Season	Division	Apps	Goals	Apps	Goals	Apps	Goals	Apps	Goals
Sarajevo	2017–18	Bosnian Premier League	13	2	—		—		13	2
Sarajevo	2018–19	Bosnian Premier League	24	2	7	0	4	1	35	3
Sarajevo	Total		37	4	7	0	4	1	48	5
Spartak Trnava	2019–20	Slovak Super Liga	16	2	1	0	4	0	21	2
Boluspor	2019–20	TFF First League	13	0	—		—		13	0
Career total			66	6	7	0	9	1	82	7

=== International ===
As of match played 16 December 2011.

National team	Year	Apps	Goals
Bosnia and Herzegovina
Bosnia and Herzegovina	2011	1	0
Total		1	0

== Honours ==
Sarajevo

- Bosnian Premier League: 2018–19
- Bosnian Cup: 2018–19
