= Domagoj Franić =

Croatian footballer (born 1993)

Personal information
- Full name: Domagoj Franić
- Date of birth: 17 August 1993 (age 33)
- Place of birth: Split, Croatia
- Height: 1.95 m (6 ft 5 in)
- Position: Centre-back

Team information
- Current team: Solin
- Number: 24

Youth career
- 2009–2012: RNK Split

Senior career*
Years	Team	Apps	(Gls)
2012–2013	RNK Split	1	(0)
2012–2013	→ Dugopolje (loan)	10	(1)
2013–2014	Mosor		
2014–2015	Lučko	22	(1)
2015–2016	Hajduk Split II	8	(1)
2016–2017	HNK Gorica	12	(1)
2017–2019	Radnik Bijeljina	43	(1)
2019–2020	Slovácko	6	(0)
2020-2021	Uskok		
2021-	Solin	26	(4)
- * Club domestic league appearances and goals as of 24 July 2022

Domagoj Franić (born 17 August 1993) is a Croatian professional footballer who plays as a centre-back for NK Solin.

== Career ==
=== Early career ===
Franić started off his professional playing career at Split in 2012. After Split, Franić played primarily for 2. HNL and 3. HNL clubs Dugopolje, Mosor and Lučko. After that, he went to Hajduk Split, but never got a chance at Hajduk and mostly played for the second team. After Hajduk, from 2016 to 2017 he played for Gorica in the 2. HNL.

=== Radnik Bijeljina ===
On 20 January 2017, Franić signed with Bosnian Premier League club Radnik Bijeljina. He made his debut for Radnik on 25 February 2017 in a 2–0 win against Olimpik. With the club, Franić won the Republika Srpska Cup in 2017 and 2018. He left Radnik on 18 January 2019, 2 years after joining the club.

=== Slovácko ===
On 31 January 2019, Franić signed with Czech First League club Slovácko.

=== NK Uskok ===
In July 2020, it was announced that Franić joined third-tier NK Uskok in Croatia.

== Career statistics ==
=== Club ===
As of match played 27 April 2019.

Club	Season	League	League		Cup		Continental		Total	
Club	Season	League	Apps	Goals	Apps	Goals	Apps	Goals	Apps	Goals
RNK Split	2011–12	1. HNL	1	0	–		0	0	1	0
Dugopolje (loan)	2012–13	2. HNL	10	1	–		–		10	1
Lučko	2013–14	2. HNL	12	1	1	0	–		13	1
Lučko	2014–15	2. HNL	10	0	0	0	–		10	0
Lučko	Total		22	1	1	0	–		23	1
Hajduk Split	2014–15	1. HNL	0	0	0	0	0	0	0	0
Hajduk Split	2015–16	1. HNL	0	0	0	0	0	0	0	0
Hajduk Split	Total		0	0	0	0	0	0	0	0
Gorica	2016–17	2. HNL	12	1	0	0	–		12	1
Radnik Bijeljina	2016–17	Bosnian Premier League	8	0	2	1	–		10	1
Radnik Bijeljina	2017–18	Bosnian Premier League	20	1	1	0	–		21	1
Radnik Bijeljina	2018–19	Bosnian Premier League	15	0	2	0	–		17	0
Radnik Bijeljina	Total		43	1	5	1	–		48	2
Slovácko	2018–19	Czech First League	6	0	–		–		6	0
Slovácko	2019–20	Czech First League	0	0	0	0	–		0	0
Slovácko	Total		6	0	0	0	–		6	0

== Honours ==
Radnik Bijeljina

- Republika Srpska Cup: 2016–17, 2017–18
