= Nedin Tucaković =

Bosnian-American footballer

Personal information
- Full name: Nedin Tucaković
- Date of birth: November 3, 1996 (age 29)
- Place of birth: San Jose, California, United States
- Height: 1.93 m (6 ft 4 in)
- Position: Goalkeeper

Youth career
- 2008–2012: San Jose Earthquakes
- 2012–2014: De Anza Force

College career
Years	Team	Apps	(Gls)
2015	San Diego State Aztecs	3	(0)
2016	San Jose State Spartans	19	(0)

Senior career*
Years	Team	Apps	(Gls)
2017–2018	Podgrmeč	11	(0)
2018-2019	FK Sarajevo	0	(0)
- * Club domestic league appearances and goals as of 12:01, February 10, 2019 (UTC)

Nedin Tucaković (born 3 November 1996) is a Bosnian-American retired footballer who last played as a goalkeeper for Bosnian Premier League club FK Sarajevo.

After retiring as a player, Tucaković became a goalkeeper coach and started a football academy.
