= Ljuban Crepulja =

Croatian professional footballer

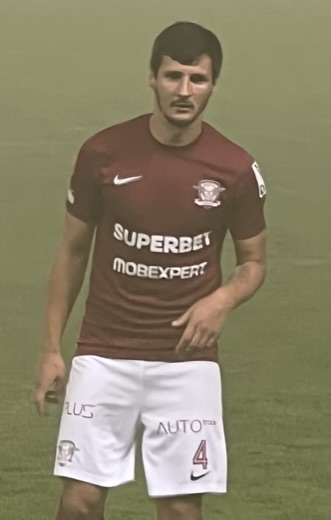
- Crepulja with Rapid București in 2022

Personal information
- Date of birth: 2 September 1993 (age 33)
- Place of birth: Čapljina, Bosnia and Herzegovina
- Height: 1.78 m (5 ft 10 in)
- Position: Midfielder

Team information
- Current team: Slaven Belupo
- Number: 21

Youth career
- 2003–2010: Segesta
- 2010–2011: Lokomotiva Zagreb
- 2011–2012: Dinamo Zagreb

Senior career*
Years	Team	Apps	(Gls)
2009–2010	Segesta	16	(0)
2012–2013	Hrvatski Dragovoljac	28	(1)
2013–2015	Slaven Belupo	79	(2)
2016–2017	Mechelen	4	(0)
2017	→ Shakhtyor Soligorsk (loan)	19	(2)
2018–2019	Sarajevo	32	(0)
2019–2021	Astra Giurgiu	72	(1)
2021–2023	Rapid București	44	(0)
2023–2024	Voluntari	35	(0)
2024–	Slaven Belupo	59	(4)

International career
2012	Croatia U20	2	(0)
- * Club domestic league appearances and goals as of 15 June 2026

Ljuban Crepulja (born 2 September 1993) is a Croatian professional footballer who plays as a midfielder for HNL club Slaven Belupo.

== Club career ==
=== Youth career ===
Crepulja, though born in Čapljina, Bosnia and Herzegovina, hails from Sisak, where he went through the ranks of HNK Segesta, debuting as a 16-year-old in the Druga HNL. He was picked up by GNK Dinamo Zagreb's feeder team NK Lokomotiva the following season for their U19 team, progressing to Dinamo U19 team itself for the 2011–12 season.

=== Hrvatski Dragovoljac ===
Not given a professional contract by Dinamo, he moved to Druga HNL again, this time to NK Hrvatski Dragovoljac, where he established himself as a first-team regular and made his first youth international caps, playing for the Croatia U20 team in December 2012.

=== Slaven Belupo ===
Dragovoljac was promoted at the end of the season, but Crepulja moved to NK Slaven Belupo. Though his start at the club was marred by a drunk-driving incident, he remained a first team regular at the club.

On 19 January 2016, it was reported that Crepulja was in Glasgow for signing talks with Celtic.

=== Sarajevo ===
Crepulja signed for Premier League of Bosnia and Herzegovina club FK Sarajevo on 6 February 2018. He left Sarajevo after almost half a year on 17 June 2019.

=== Astra Giurgiu ===
On 28 June 2019, Crepulja signed a two-years contract with Romanian club Astra Giurgiu.

== Honours ==
=== Club ===
Hrvatski Dragovoljac

- 2. HNL: 2012–13

Shakhtyor Soligorsk

- Belarusian Cup runner-up: 2016–17

Sarajevo

- Bosnian Premier League: 2018–19
- Bosnian Cup: 2018–19

Astra Giurgiu

- Cupa României runner-up: 2020–21

Slaven Belupo

- Croatian Cup runner-up: 2024–25
