= Igor Makitan =

Bosnian footballer

Personal information
- Date of birth: 12 October 1994 (age 32)
- Position: Defender

Senior career*
Years	Team	Apps	(Gls)
2016–2017	FK Kozara		
2017–2021	FK Krupa	73	(3)
2021–2023	TS Galaxy	13	(0)
- * Club domestic league appearances and goals as of 1 January 2024

Igor Makitan (born 12 October 1994) is a Bosnian professional footballer who last played as a defender for South African Premier Division club TS Galaxy.
