= Saša Nikodijević =

Serbian footballer (born 1987)

Personal information
- Full name: Saša Nikodijević
- Date of birth: 16 July 1987 (age 39)
- Place of birth: Paris, France
- Height: 1.83 m (6 ft 0 in)
- Position: Right-back

Senior career*
Years	Team	Apps	(Gls)
2005–2006	Polet Beograd		
2006–2010	Radnički Svilajnac		
2007	→ Morava Velika Plana (loan)	9	(0)
2011–2013	Jagodina	22	(0)
2013–2014	Jedinstvo Putevi	27	(2)
2014–2017	Metalac Gornji Milanovac	94	(2)
2017–2019	Krupa	52	(2)
- * Club domestic league appearances and goals as of 25 May 2019

Saša Nikodijević (Serbian Cyrillic: Саша Никодијевић; born 16 July 1987) is a Serbian football defender.

He is the brother of Slađan Nikodijević.
