= Ševkija Resić =

Bosnian footballer

Personal information
- Date of birth: 4 December 1999 (age 26)
- Place of birth: Tuzla, Bosnia and Herzegovina
- Height: 1.72 m (5 ft 7 1/2 in)
- Position: Midfielder

Youth career
- –2018: Sarajevo

Senior career*
Years	Team	Apps	(Gls)
2018–2021	Sarajevo	8	(1)
2019–2020	→ Čelik Zenica (loan)	12	(1)
2020	→ Novi Pazar (loan)	15	(1)
2021	→ Sloboda Tuzla (loan)	4	(0)
2021	Vis Simm-Bau	14	(5)
2022	Željezničar	12	(0)
2022–2023	Zvijezda 09	32	(5)
2023–2024	Vis Simm-Bau		

International career
2015	Bosnia and Herzegovina U17	13	(2)
2016	Bosnia and Herzegovina U19	14	(0)
2020	Bosnia and Herzegovina U21	4	(2)
- * Club domestic league appearances and goals as of 15:04, 8 July 2023 (UTC)

Ševkija Resić (born 4 December 1999) is a Bosnian professional footballer who plays as a midfielder. He plays for Vis Simm-Bau

== Honours ==
Sarajevo

- Bosnian Premier League: 2018–19
- Bosnian Cup: 2018–19
