= Miloš Simonović (footballer) =

Serbian footballer

Personal information
- Date of birth: 28 May 1990 (age 36)
- Place of birth: Zaječar, SFR Yugoslavia
- Height: 1.88 m (6 ft 2 in)
- Position: Centre-back

Senior career*
Years	Team	Apps	(Gls)
2008–2011	Beograd	68	(4)
2011–2012	Balkan Mirijevo	27	(1)
2012–2013	Radnički Obrenovac	39	(1)
2014–2015	Inđija	41	(1)
2015–2018	Napredak Kruševac	77	(2)
2016	→ Radnik Surdulica (loan)	11	(0)
2018	Sogdiana Jizzakh	17	(0)
2019–2020	Radnik Bijeljina	33	(0)
2020	Krupa	6	(0)
2021	Radnik Bijeljina	14	(0)
2021	Radnik Surdulica	12	(0)
2022	Timok	16	(0)

International career
2017	Serbia	1	(0)
- * Club domestic league appearances and goals as of 2 October 2022

Miloš Simonović (Serbian Cyrillic: Милош Симоновић, pronounced [mǐloʃ simǒːnoʋitɕ]; born 28 May 1990) is a Serbian professional footballer who plays as a centre-back.

== Club career ==
Born in Zaječar, Simonović started his career with Beograd, where he spent 3 seasons, and scored 4 goals in 68 matches. In the 2011–12 season, Simonović spent with Balkan Mirijevo, and the next season and a half he was with Radnički Obrenovac.

With the beginning of 2014, he joined Serbian First League club Inđija. During the time he spent with Inđija, Simonović usually played as a centre-back, but also appeared as a right-back for some matches. For the 2015–16 season, he joined Napredak Kruševac.

Because of a deficit of defenders, Simonović moved to Radnik Surdulica, on a six month loan from Napredak.

After leaving Napredak in the summer of 2018, he joined Uzbekistan Super League club Sogdiana Jizzakh, but after only half a season, he left Sogdiana and signed a one-and-a-half-year contract with Bosnian Premier League club Radnik Bijeljina in February 2019. Simonović made his debut for Radnik on 24 February 2019, in a 1–0 home league win against Željezničar. Even though not a significant one, he won his first trophy, not only with Radnik, but in his entire career on 30 May 2019, the Republika Srpska Cup, after Radnik beat Krupa 3–1 in the final. Simonović left Radnik in July 2020.

On 14 September 2020, he signed with Krupa. Simonović made his official debut for Krupa four days later, on 19 September, in a league match against Željezničar. Only three months after joining Krupa, he terminated his contract with the club on 19 December 2020.

In February 2021, Simonović came back to Radnik Bijeljina. He debuted for the club again in a league game against Velež Mostar on 27 February 2021.

== International career ==
Simonović was called by coach Slavoljub Muslin in the Serbia national team in January 2017.

On 29 January 2017, Simonović made his international debut for Serbia in a friendly match against the United States in a 0–0 away draw in San Diego.

== Honours ==
Radnik Bijeljina

- Republika Srpska Cup: 2018–19
