= 2016–17 Croatian Second Football League =

Season of the Croatian League Two

FavBet Druga liga
- Season: 2016–17
- Champions: Rudeš
- Promoted: Rudeš
- Relegated: NK Zagreb; Imotski
- Matches: 198
- Goals: 447 (2.26 per match)
- Top goalscorer: Benjamin Tatar (13)
- Biggest home win: Rudeš 7–1 Lučko
- Biggest away win: NK Zagreb 0–4 Sesvete
- Highest scoring: Solin 5–4 NK Zagreb
- Total attendance: 62,809
- Average attendance: 317
- All statistics correct as of 28 May 2017.

The 2016–17 Croatian Second Football League (officially FavBet Druga liga for sponsorship reasons) is the 26th season of the Croatian Second Football League, the second-level football competition for men's association football teams in Croatia, since its establishment in 1992. The season started on 19 August 2016 and ended on 28 May 2017.

The league is contested by twelve teams and played in a triple round robin format, with each team playing every other team three times over 33 rounds. At the end of the previous season Cibalia were promoted, returning to the top flight after three seasons.

The fixtures were announced on 17 July 2016.

== Teams ==
On 22 April 2016, Croatian Football Federation announced that the first stage of licensing procedure for 2016–17 season was completed. For the 2016–17 Druga HNL, only eight clubs outside of top level were issued a second level license: Dugopolje, Dinamo II, Gorica, Imotski, Lučko, Rijeka II, Sesvete and Solin. In the second stage of licensing procedure clubs that were not licensed in the first round appealed the decision. On 23 May 2016, all remaining Druga HNL were granted second division license, along with third-level clubs Novigrad and Vinogradar.

=== Stadia and locations ===
Locations of teams in 2016–17 Druga HNL

Club	Coach	City / Town	Stadium	2015–16 result	Capacity
Dinamo II	Mario Cvitanović	Zagreb	Stadion Hitrec-Kacian	6th	5,000
Dugopolje	Miroslav Bojko	Dugopolje	Stadion Hrvatski vitezovi	7th	5,200
Gorica	Davor Mladina	Velika Gorica	Stadion Radnika	4th	8,000
Hrvatski Dragovoljac	Iztok Kapušin	Zagreb	Stadion NŠC Stjepan Spajić	10th	5,000
Imotski	Vjeran Simunić	Imotski	Stadion Gospin dolac	9th	4,000
Lučko	Dražen Biškup	Zagreb	Stadion Lučko	8th	1,500
Novigrad	Nino Bule	Novigrad	Stadion Lako	1st (3. HNL West)	1,000
Rudeš	Igor Bišćan	Zagreb	ŠC Rudeš	5th	1,000
Sesvete	Denis Bezer	Zagreb	Sv. Josip Radnik	3rd	1,200
Solin	Mirko Labrović	Solin	Stadion pokraj Jadra	1st (3. HNL South)	4,000
Šibenik	Zoran Slavica	Šibenik	Stadion Šubićevac	2nd	8,000
NK Zagreb	Dražen Madunović	Zagreb	Stadion Kranjčevićeva	12th (1. HNL)	8,850

=== Number of teams by county ===
Position	County	Number	Teams
1	City of Zagreb	6	Dinamo Zagreb II, Hrvatski Dragovoljac, Lučko, Rudeš, Sesvete and Zagreb
2	Split-Dalmatia	3	Dugopolje, Imotski and Solin
3	(Istria County) Istria	1	Novigrad
3	Šibenik-Knin	1	Šibenik
3	Zagreb County	1	Gorica

== League table ==
Pos	Team	Pld	W	D	L	GF	GA	GD	Pts	Qualification or relegation
1	Rudeš (C, P)	33	17	9	7	43	27	+16	60	Promotion to the Croatian First Football League
2	Gorica	33	15	12	6	53	31	+22	57	Qualification to the promotion play-off
3	Solin	33	16	7	10	40	36	+4	55	
4	Sesvete	33	15	7	11	53	36	+17	52	
5	Dinamo Zagreb II	33	12	11	10	39	32	+7	47	Reserve teams are ineligible for promotion to the Croatian First Football League
6	Dugopolje	33	12	10	11	36	32	+4	46	
7	Šibenik	33	12	9	12	32	33	−1	45	
8	Novigrad	33	11	9	13	28	35	−7	42	
9	Lučko	33	9	11	13	34	48	−14	38	
10	Hrvatski Dragovoljac	33	9	9	15	30	39	−9	36	Relegation to the Croatian Third Football League
11	Imotski (R)	33	8	7	18	36	58	−22	31	Relegation to the Croatian Third Football League
12	NK Zagreb (R)	33	6	11	16	34	50	−16	29	Relegation to the Croatian Third Football League

Source: Druga-HNL.com
Rules for classification: 1) Points; 2) Head-to-head points; 3) Head-to-head goal difference; 4) Head-to-head away goals scored
(C) Champions; (P) Promoted; (R) Relegated

== Results ==
=== Matches 1–22 ===
Home \ Away	DIN	DUG	GOR	HRD	IMO	LUČ	NOV	RUD	SES	SOL	ŠIB	ZAG
Dinamo Zagreb II		1–0	0–0	1–1	4–2	1–2	0–1	3–2	2–2	3–1	2–1	1–1
Dugopolje	1–0		4–1	1–0	2–0	2–1	0–1	0–0	2–2	1–0	1–0	3–1
Gorica	1–0	3–0		4–0	1–0	2–2	3–1	1–0	0–0	0–0	3–2	2–1
Hrvatski Dragovoljac	1–1	0–2	1–1		2–3	1–2	2–0	1–3	1–0	1–3	1–2	1–0
Imotski	0–0	2–1	0–2	1–1		3–2	2–2	2–0	0–2	1–4	3–2	2–3
Lučko	1–1	1–1	1–1	0–0	1–0		0–0	0–1	3–3	0–1	2–1	2–2
Novigrad	0–1	1–0	1–0	1–2	3–1	1–0		1–2	0–2	3–0	0–0	2–1
Rudeš	1–1	3–1	1–1	2–1	1–0	7–1	1–1		0–0	1–0	2–0	0–0
Sesvete	2–3	2–1	2–1	2–1	3–1	2–1	0–1	0–0		4–1	4–0	0–0
Solin	1–1	1–0	2–1	0–1	2–0	2–1	0–2	2–0	3–2		1–1	5–4
Šibenik	1–0	2–1	0–0	0–1	2–0	1–0	3–1	1–3	1–0	0–1		1–1
NK Zagreb	0–2	0–0	2–5	0–0	1–3	4–0	0–0	5–1	3–1	1–1	1–0	

Source: Druga-HNL.com
Legend: Blue = home team win; Yellow = draw; Red = away team win.

=== Matches 23-33 ===
Home \ Away	DIN	DUG	GOR	HRD	IMO	LUČ	NOV	RUD	SES	SOL	ŠIB	ZAG
Dinamo Zagreb II		0–1				1–1	1–0			3–0	0–0	3–0
Dugopolje				2–2	1–1	1–1					0–0	3–1
Gorica	1–0	1–1		2–1	2–2		5–0			1–1		
Hrvatski Dragovoljac	0–1				4–0		2–0			1–0	0–1	
Imotski	2–0						2–1			1–1	1–1	0–1
Lučko			3–2	1–0	2–0			1–1	0–2			
Novigrad		1–1				0–1			2–0	0–0	0–0	1–1
Rudeš	1–0	1–0	0–2	0–0	2–1		2–0					
Sesvete	4–2	0–1	1–0	3–0	2–0			1–3				
Solin		2–1				2–0		0–1	1–0		1–0	1–0
Šibenik			2–2			2–0		1–0	2–1			2–0
NK Zagreb			0–2	0–0		0–1		0–1	0–4			

Source: Druga-HNL.com
Legend: Blue = home team win; Yellow = draw; Red = away team win.

== Top scorers ==
As of 28 May 2017

Rank	Player	Club(s)	Goals
1	(Bosnia and Herzegovina) Benjamin Tatar	Gorica	13
2	(Croatia) Mario Jelavić	Solin	12
3	(Bosnia and Herzegovina) Edin Šehić	NK Zagreb	10
4	(Croatia) Tomislav Havojić	Rudeš	9
4	(Croatia) Vedran Mesec	Sesvete	9
4	(Croatia) Miro Slavica	Šibenik	9
4	(Croatia) Tomislav Štrkalj	Sesvete	9
8	(Bosnia and Herzegovina) Marin Pejić	Gorica	8
8	(Croatia) Martin Vukorepa	Šibenik	8

== See also ==
- 2016–17 Croatian Football Cup
- 2016–17 Croatian First Football League
