= Nathan (footballer, born May 1999) =

Brazilian footballer (born 1999)

Personal information
- Full name: Nathan Crepaldi da Cruz
- Date of birth: 28 May 1999 (age 27)
- Place of birth: Brasilândia, Brazil
- Height: 1.73 m (5 ft 8 in)
- Position: Forward

Team information
- Current team: Travnik

Youth career
- 2012–2019: Metropolitano

Senior career*
Years	Team	Apps	(Gls)
2019–2021	Sarajevo	6	(0)
2020–2021	→ Olimpik (loan)	16	(0)
2021–2022	Tubarão		
2022	Sloboda Novi Grad	17	(2)
2023	Rad	12	(0)
2023–2025	Radnik Bijeljina	49	(4)
2025–	Travnik	0	(0)
- * Club domestic league appearances and goals as of 1 June 2025

Nathan Crepaldi da Cruz, simply known as Nathan (born 28 May 1999), is a Brazilian professional footballer who plays as a forward for First League of the FBiH club Travnik.

== Honours ==
Sarajevo

- Bosnian Premier League: 2018–19, 2019–20
- Bosnian Cup: 2018–19

Radnik Bijeljina

- First League of RS: 2023–24
