= Ahmed Hasanović =

Bosnian footballer

Personal information
- Full name: Ahmed Hasanović
- Date of birth: 6 February 2000 (age 26)
- Place of birth: Fojnica, Bosnia and Herzegovina
- Height: 1.77 m (5 ft 9 1/2 in)
- Position: Forward

Team information
- Current team: Rudar Kakanj
- Number: 7

Youth career
- 2013–2018: Željezničar
- 2018–2019: Sarajevo

Senior career*
Years	Team	Apps	(Gls)
2019–2020	Sarajevo	0	(0)
2019–2020	→ Goražde (loan)	11	(3)
2020	Olimpik	8	(2)
2021	Međimurje	16	(2)
2021–2022	GOŠK Gabela	23	(3)
2022–2023	Goražde	14	(4)
2023–	Rudar Kakanj	17	(4)

International career
2016	Bosnia and Herzegovina U17	2	(0)
- * Club domestic league appearances and goals as of 7 November 2020

Ahmed Hasanović (born 6 February 2000) is a Bosnian professional footballer who plays as a forward for Rudar Kakanj.

== Club career ==
He has also played for Bosnian Premier League club Olimpik.
