= Marko Perišić =

Bosnian footballer (born 1991)

Personal information
- Date of birth: 25 January 1991 (age 35)
- Place of birth: Sarajevo, SFR Yugoslavia
- Height: 1.82 m (6 ft 0 in)
- Position: Defensive midfielder

Team information
- Current team: Slavija Sarajevo
- Number: 6

Youth career
- –2009: Slavija Sarajevo

Senior career*
Years	Team	Apps	(Gls)
2010–2014	Slavija Sarajevo	93	(4)
2014	Spartaks Jūrmala	16	(0)
2014–2015	Al-Ahly Benghazi	1	(0)
2015–2016	ViOn Zlaté Moravce	26	(1)
2016–2017	Kapfenberger SV	6	(2)
2017–2019	Zrinjski Mostar	41	(0)
2019–2020	Čelik Zenica	19	(0)
2020–2021	Olimpik	20	(0)
2021–2022	Leotar	43	(0)
2023–2025	Radnik Bijeljina	61	(4)
2025–	Slavija Sarajevo	14	(1)
- * Club domestic league appearances and goals as of 26 November 2025

Marko Perišić (born 25 January 1991) is a Bosnian professional footballer who plays as a defensive midfielder for First League of RS club Slavija Sarajevo.

== Club career ==
Perišić had a spell at Austrian second-tier side Kapfenberger SV in 2016.

== Honours ==
Zrinjski Mostar

- Bosnian Premier League: 2017–18

Radnik Bijeljina

- First League of RS: 2023–24
