= Mario Crnički =

Croatian footballer (born 1998)

Personal information
- Full name: Mario Daniel Crnički
- Date of birth: 4 February 1998 (age 28)
- Place of birth: Munich, Germany
- Height: 1.78 m (5 ft 10 in)
- Position: Forward

Team information
- Current team: TSV Landsberg
- Number: 10

Youth career
- 2005–2017: Bayern Munich

Senior career*
Years	Team	Apps	(Gls)
2017–2018	Bayern Munich II	16	(2)
2018	Olympiakos Nicosia	7	(2)
2019–2020	Sarajevo	0	(0)
2019	→ Mladost Doboj Kakanj (loan)	11	(2)
2020	→ Čelik Zenica (loan)	1	(1)
2020–2021	Energie Cottbus	2	(0)
2021–2022	Dugopolje	16	(1)
2022–2024	Türkgücü München	41	(2)
2024–	TSV Landsberg	1	(0)

International career
2013	Croatia U15	2	(1)
2013–2014	Croatia U16	3	(2)
2014–2015	Croatia U17	3	(2)
2016	Croatia U19	1	(1)
- * Club domestic league appearances and goals as of 20 July 2024

Mario Daniel Crnički (born 4 February 1998) is a professional footballer who plays as a forward for German Bayernliga club TSV Landsberg. Born in Germany, he represented Croatia internationally on junior levels.

== Career ==
At the age of 7, Crnički joined the youth academy of Bayern Munich, Germany's most successful clubs.

In 2018, he signed for Olympiakos Nicosia in the Cypriot Second Division after receiving interest from Hajduk, one of Croatia's most successful teams.

In 2019, Crnički was sent on loan to Mladost (Doboj Kakanj) in Bosnia and Herzegovina from FK Sarajevo, Bosnia and Herzegovina's most successful side, where he made 11 league appearances and scored two goals.

In 2020, he signed for Energie Cottbus in the German fourth division.

Crnički joined recently relegated Regionalliga Bayern club Türkgücü München on 3 September 2022.
