= 2018–19 Bosnia and Herzegovina Football Cup =

23rd Bosnia and Herzegovina Football Cup

Tournament details
- Country: Bosnia and Herzegovina
- Teams: 32

Final positions
- Champions: Sarajevo (6th title)
- Runners-up: Široki Brijeg

Tournament statistics
- Matches played: 37
- Goals scored: 89 (2.41 per match)
- Top goal scorer(s): Dražen Bagarić; Dino Kalesić (4 goals)

The 2018–19 Bosnia and Herzegovina Football Cup was the 23rd edition of Bosnia and Herzegovina's annual football cup, and the eighteenth season of the unified competition. The winner qualified for the 2019–20 UEFA Europa League qualifying round.

FK Željezničar Sarajevo were the defending champions, but they got eliminated by NK Široki Brijeg in the first round. FK Sarajevo won the cup after beating Široki Brijeg in the final.

== Participating teams ==
The following teams participated in the 2018–19 Bosnia and Herzegovina Football Cup.

2018–19 Premier League (12 teams)	2018–19 FBiH Cup (12 teams)	Football Association of Republika Srpska teams (8 teams)
Željezničar Sarajevo^{title holder}; Čelik Zenica; GOŠK Gabela; Krupa; Mladost Doboj Kakanj; Radnik Bijeljina; Sarajevo; Sloboda Tuzla; Široki Brijeg; Tuzla City; Zrinjski Mostar; Zvijezda 09	First League of the FBiH (II): Bosna Visoko; Goražde; Igman Konjic; Metalleghe Jajce; Rudar Kakanj; TOŠK Tešanj; Velež Mostar; Zvijezda Gradačac; Second League of the FBiH (III): Klis Buturović Polje (group South); Moševac (group Center); Pobjeda Tešanjka (group Center); First League of Tuzla Canton (IV): Mladost Kikači	First League of the Republika Srpska (II): Alfa Modriča; Borac Banja Luka; Kozara Gradiška; Rudar Prijedor; Slavija Istočno Sarajevo; Sloga Gornje Crnjelovo; Second League of the Republika Srpska (III): Leotar Trebinje (group East); Sloga Doboj (group West) (Note: FK Sloga Doboj withdrawn from the competition prior to First round draw.)

Roman numbers in brackets denote the level of the respective league in the Bosnian football league system

== Calendar ==
Round	Date(s)
1st Round	13 September 2018 (draw); 19 September 2018
2nd Round	24 September 2018 (draw); 3 October 2018
Quarter final	18 February 2019 (draw); 27 February 2019 (leg 1); 13 March 2019 (leg 2)
Semi final	19 March 2019 (draw); 3 April 2019 (leg 1); 10 April 2019 (leg 2)
Final	12 April 2019 (draw)^{1} 8 May 2019 (leg 1); 15 May 2019 (leg 2)

^{1} Draw is held to determine which team will host leg 1 and which will host leg 2.

== Bracket ==
Quarter-finals
Sloga Gornje Crnjelovo	1	2	3
Klis Buturović Polje	1	2	3
Sarajevo	1	1	2
Zrinjski Mostar	0	0	0
Široki Brijeg	2	1	3
Borac Banja Luka	1	0	1
Zvijezda Gradačac	0	1	1
TOŠK Tešanj	2	4	6

Semi-finals
Sloga Gornje Crnjelovo	1	0	1
Sarajevo	4	5	9
Široki Brijeg	2	1	3
TOŠK Tešanj	0	0	0

Final
Sarajevo	3	0	3
Široki Brijeg	0	1	1

== First round ==
Played on 19 September 2018

Home team	Away team	Result
Igman Konjic (II)	Rudar Prijedor (II)	0–2
Kozara Gradiška (II)	Radnik Bijeljina (I)	1–4
Velež Mostar (II)	Sarajevo (I)	0–1
Moševac (III)	Rudar Kakanj (II)	1–1 (3–4 p)
Tuzla City (I)	Zrinjski Mostar (I)	0–0 (2–4 p)
Čelik Zenica (I)	Krupa (I)	1–2
Zvijezda 09 (I)	Mladost Doboj Kakanj (I)	1–0
Alfa Modriča (II)	Borac Banja Luka (II)	1–3
Metalleghe Jajce (II)	Sloboda Tuzla (I)	0–1
Sloga Gornje Crnjelovo (II)	Slavija Istočno Sarajevo (II)	4–0
Pobjeda Tešanjka (III)	Zvijezda Gradačac (II)	1–3
TOŠK Tešanj (II)	Goražde (II)	3–0
Bosna Visoko (II)	GOŠK Gabela (I)	1–2
Mladost Kikači (IV)	Leotar Trebinje (III)	3–2
Široki Brijeg (I)	Željezničar Sarajevo (I)	2–0

== Second round ==
Played on 3 October 2018

Home team	Away team	Result
Rudar Prijedor (II)	Klis Buturović Polje (III)	2–2 (2–3 p)
TOŠK Tešanj (II)	GOŠK Gabela (I)	4–0
Rudar Kakanj (II)	Sarajevo (I)	0–0 (2–4 p)
Zvijezda Gradačac (II)	Zvijezda 09 (I)	2–0
Mladost Kikači (IV)	Sloga Gornje Crnjelovo (II)	2–2 (6–7 p)
Borac Banja Luka (II)	Radnik Bijeljina (I)	0–0 (5–4 p)
Zrinjski Mostar (I)	Krupa (I)	1–1 (4–2 p)
Sloboda Tuzla (I)	Široki Brijeg (I)	0–0 (4–5 p)

== Quarter final ==
First legs were played on 27 February, return legs were played on 13 March

Team 1	Team 2	Leg 1	Leg 2	Agg. score
Zvijezda Gradačac (II)	TOŠK Tešanj (II)	0–2	1–4	1–6
Sloga Gornje Crnjelovo (II)^{1}	Klis Buturović Polje (III)^{1}	1–1	2–2	3–3
Sarajevo (I)	Zrinjski Mostar (I)	1–0	1–0	2–0
Široki Brijeg (I)	Borac Banja Luka (II)	2–1	1–0	3–1

^{1}Sloga asked the Football Association of Bosnia and Herzegovina for their match against Klis to be prolonged because of their preparations in Antalya, and according to the official announcement from the association, the proposal was approved. The match between these two teams was played on 5 March 2019.

== Semi final ==
The first legs were played on 3 April, the return legs were played on 10 April

Team 1	Team 2	Leg 1	Leg 2	Agg. score
Sloga Gornje Crnjelovo (II)	Sarajevo (I)	1–4	0–5	1–9
Široki Brijeg (I)	TOŠK Tešanj (II)	2–0	1–0	3–0

== Final ==
The first leg was played on May 8, the return leg was played on May 15

Team 1	Team 2	Leg 1	Leg 2	Agg. score
Sarajevo (I)	Široki Brijeg (I)	3–0	0–1	3–1

=== First leg ===
8 May 2019
18:00

Sarajevo	3–0	Široki Brijeg
Rahmanović 10'; Kapić 40'; Mujakić 90+3'	Report

Asim Ferhatović Hase Stadium, Sarajevo
Attendance: 7,500
Referee: Dragan Petrović (Banja Luka)

=== Second leg ===
15 May 2019
17:00

Široki Brijeg	1–0	Sarajevo
Bagarić 23'	Report

Pecara Stadium, Široki Brijeg
Attendance: 2,000
Referee: Elvis Mujić (Banovići)
