= 2021–22 FK Sarajevo season =

Sarajevo
2021–22 season
- Owner: Vincent Tan (60%); Ismir Mirvić (30%)
- Chairman: Damir Kasum (until 16 September); Ismir Mirvić (from 19 September)
- Manager: Goran Sablić (until 27 December); Aleksandar Vasoski (from 10 January to 10 May); Dženan Uščuplić (caretaker, from 12 May)
- Stadium: Asim Ferhatović Hase Stadium
- Premier League BiH: 4th
- Cup of BiH: Runners-up
- UEFA Europa Conference League: First qualifying round
- Top goalscorer: League: Asmir Suljić (5); All: Dal Varešanović; Hamza Čataković; Asmir Suljić (5)
- Highest home attendance: 11,000 vs Željezničar (22 September 2021)
- Lowest home attendance: 1,000 vs Sloboda Tuzla (22 May 2022)
- Average home league attendance: 3,062
- Biggest win: Sarajevo 6–0 Rudar (10 April 2022)
- Biggest defeat: Zrinjski 4–0 Sarajevo (16 April 2022)
Home colours	Away colours	Third colours

The 2021–22 Sarajevo season was the club's 73rd season in existence, and their 28th consecutive season in the top flight of Bosnian football, the Premier League of BiH. Besides competing in the Premier League, the team also competed in the National Cup. Sarajevo competed in the qualifications for the UEFA Europa Conference League as well.

== Squad information ==
=== First-team squad ===
As of 7 May 2022

Note: Flags indicate national team as defined under FIFA eligibility rules; some limited exceptions apply. Players may hold more than one non-FIFA nationality.

No.	Pos.	Nation	Player
3	DF	BIH	Selmir Pidro
4	DF	BIH	Halid Šabanović (6th captain)
5	DF	SRB	Darko Lazić
6	MF	CRO	Mirko Oremuš
7	MF	BIH	Anel Hebibović (3rd captain)
8	MF	BIH	Andrej Đokanović
9	FW	BIH	Mersudin Ahmetović (4th captain)
10	FW	AUT	Darko Bodul
11	FW	MKD	Krste Velkoski (captain)
16	MF	BIH	Adnan Šećerović
17	MF	BIH	Dal Varešanović
18	FW	MNE	Boris Cmiljanić

No.	Pos.	Nation	Player
19	DF	BIH	Nihad Mujakić
21	DF	BIH	Dino Islamović
22	FW	CRO	Dražen Bagarić
25	MF	BIH	Kerim Palić
26	GK	BIH	Adnan Kanurić
27	MF	MKD	Daniel Avramovski
29	DF	BIH	Amer Dupovac (vice-captain)
35	GK	BIH	Belmin Dizdarević
88	MF	BIH	Rifet Kapić
96	MF	BIH	Rijad Kobiljar
97	FW	BIH	Hamza Čataković
99	MF	BIH	Asmir Suljić (5th captain)

=== Youth academy players ===
FK Sarajevo Academy players that received a first-team squad call-up.

No.	Pos.	Nation	Player
1	GK	BIH	Muhamed Šahinović
14	MF	BIH	Tarik Ramić
28	FW	BIH	Aldin Mešić

No.	Pos.	Nation	Player
30	FW	BIH	Irfan Ramić
33	DF	BIH	Muharem Trako
50	MF	BIH	Muhamed Buljubašić

== Transfers ==
=== In ===
Date	Pos.	Player	From	Fee	Ref.
17 June 2021	DF	(Serbia) Darko Lazić	Free agent	Free transfer	
19 June 2021	DF	(Croatia) Vicko Ševelj	(Croatia) Hajduk Split II	Free transfer	
6 July 2021	MF	(Bosnia and Herzegovina) Kerim Palić	(Bosnia and Herzegovina) Krupa	Free transfer	
17 July 2021	FW	(Croatia) Dražen Bagarić	(Romania) Hermannstadt	Free transfer	
18 July 2021	FW	(Austria) Darko Bodul	(Turkey) Ankaraspor	Free transfer	
29 July 2021	MF	(Bosnia and Herzegovina) Rijad Kobiljar	(Germany) Uerdingen 05	Free transfer	
2 September 2021	MF	(Bosnia and Herzegovina) Rifet Kapić	(Germany) SC Paderborn	Free transfer	
7 January 2022	MF	(Bosnia and Herzegovina) Asmir Suljić	(Hungary) Diósgyőri	Free transfer	
9 January 2022	MF	(Bosnia and Herzegovina) Adnan Šećerović	(Armenia) Pyunik	Free transfer	
22 January 2022	DF	(Bosnia and Herzegovina) Nihad Mujakić	(Belgium) Kortrijk	Undisclosed	
4 February 2022	FW	(Bosnia and Herzegovina) Hamza Čataković	(Bulgaria) CSKA Sofia	Free transfer	
7 February 2022	MF	(North Macedonia) Daniel Avramovski	Free agent	Free transfer	
Total				€0	

=== Out ===
Date	Pos.	Player	To	Fee	Ref.
4 June 2021	DF	(Bosnia and Herzegovina) Dušan Hodžić	(Serbia) Radnik Surdulica	End of contract	
7 June 2021	FW	(Bosnia and Herzegovina) Haris Handžić	(Lebanon) Ahed	End of contract	
7 June 2021	FW	(Bosnia and Herzegovina) Slobodan Milanović	(Bosnia and Herzegovina) Posušje	End of contract	
11 June 2021	GK	(Slovenia) Elvis Džafić	(Slovenia) Ilirija 1911	End of contract	
18 June 2021	MF	(Bosnia and Herzegovina) Zinedin Mustedanagić	(Albania) Vllaznia Shkodër	Contract termination	
18 June 2021	GK	(Bosnia and Herzegovina) Vladan Kovačević	(Poland) Raków	€300,000 (Note: Initial €300,000 plus 15% of any future transfer fee (€720,000 received following the player's transfer to Sporting CP).)	
30 June 2021	DF	(Bosnia and Herzegovina) Hrvoje Miličević	(Cyprus) AEK Larnaca	Contract termination	
1 July 2021	FW	(Brazil) Nathan	(Brazil) Tubarão	End of contract	
2 July 2021	FW	(Bosnia and Herzegovina) Jasmin Mešanović	(Hungary) Kisvárda	Contract termination	
12 July 2021	MF	(Ghana) Joachim Adukor	(Kazakhstan) Aktobe	Contract termination	
22 July 2021	MF	(Bosnia and Herzegovina) Ivan Jukić	(Bosnia and Herzegovina) Zrinjski Mostar	Contract termination	
30 July 2021	MF	(Bosnia and Herzegovina) Amar Sabljica	(Bosnia and Herzegovina) Igman Konjic	Contract termination	
5 August 2021	MF	(Bosnia and Herzegovina) Amar Jašarević	(Bosnia and Herzegovina) Radnik Hadžići	Contract termination	
11 August 2021	MF	(Bosnia and Herzegovina) Ševkija Resić	(Bosnia and Herzegovina) Vis Simm-Bau	Contract termination	
25 August 2021	MF	(Bosnia and Herzegovina) Tino-Sven Sušić	(Russia) Kuban Krasnodar	Contract termination	
17 January 2022	DF	(Bosnia and Herzegovina) Numan Kurdić	(Belgium) RWDM	€150,000	
1 February 2022	DF	(Bosnia and Herzegovina) Selmir Pidro	(United States) St. Louis City	Undisclosed	
24 February 2022	FW	(England) Matthias Fanimo	Free agent	Contract termination	
Total				€450,000	

=== Loans in ===
Start date	End date	Pos.	Player	From	Ref.
1 February 2022	End of season	DF	(Bosnia and Herzegovina) Selmir Pidro	(United States) St. Louis City	

=== Loans out ===
Start date	End date	Pos.	Player	To	Ref.
7 August 2021	31 December 2021	DF	(Bosnia and Herzegovina) Hamza Bešić	(Bosnia and Herzegovina) Vis Simm-Bau	
14 August 2021	End of season	MF	(Bosnia and Herzegovina) Đani Salčin	(Bosnia and Herzegovina) Velež Mostar	
29 January 2022	End of season	DF	(Bosnia and Herzegovina) Hamza Bešić	(Bosnia and Herzegovina) Goražde	
29 January 2022	End of season	MF	(Bosnia and Herzegovina) Haris Konjalić	(Bosnia and Herzegovina) Goražde	
29 January 2022	End of season	DF	(Bosnia and Herzegovina) Armin Imamović	(Bosnia and Herzegovina) Zvijezda Gradačac	
12 February 2022	End of season	FW	(Bosnia and Herzegovina) Kenan Dervišagić	(Bosnia and Herzegovina) Radnik Hadžići	
12 February 2022	6 March 2022 (Note: Due to Russian invasion of Ukraine, the loan was cancelled.)	DF	(Croatia) Vicko Ševelj	(Russia) Akron Tolyatti	
8 April 2022	End of season	DF	(Croatia) Vicko Ševelj	(Slovenia) Radomlje	

== Kit ==
Supplier	Sponsor
(Italy) Erreà	(Turkey) Turkish Airlines

== Pre-season and friendlies ==
Win Draw Loss Fixtures

26 June 2021 Friendly	Sloboda Tuzla (Bosnia and Herzegovina)	1–1	(Bosnia and Herzegovina) Sarajevo	Tuzla
18:00 CEST (UTC+2)	Alić 43'	Report	Ševelj 25'	Stadium: Tušanj City Stadium

4 September 2021 Friendly	Sarajevo (Bosnia and Herzegovina)	2–3	(Serbia) Novi Pazar	Sarajevo
17:00 CEST (UTC+2)	Ahmetović 13'; Varešanović 89' (pen.)	Report	Dzhamalutdinov 30', 64'; Ratković 53'	Stadium: Asim Ferhatović Hase Stadium

22 January 2022 Friendly	Ljubuški (Bosnia and Herzegovina)	0–4	(Bosnia and Herzegovina) Sarajevo	Ljubuški
14:30 CET (UTC+1)		Report	Dupovac 47'; Cmiljanić 66', 79'; Ramić 76'	Stadium: Babovac Stadium

5 February 2022 Friendly	Sarajevo (Bosnia and Herzegovina)	2–3	(Denmark) Horsens	Antalya, Turkey
17:30 TRT (UTC+3)	Kapić 60' (pen.); Velkoski 77'	Report	Tengstedt 6'; Santos 32'; Jensen 38'

9 February 2022 Friendly	Sarajevo (Bosnia and Herzegovina)	5–0	(Uzbekistan) Qizilqum Zarafshon	Antalya, Turkey
15:00 TRT (UTC+3)	Bagarić 8'; Pidro 20'; Varešanović 25'; Ramić 79'; Čataković 81'	Report

11 February 2022 Friendly	Sarajevo (Bosnia and Herzegovina)	0–1	(Uzbekistan) Nasaf	Antalya, Turkey
15:00 TRT (UTC+3)	Čataković (red card) 40'	Report	Dupovac 14' (o.g.)

12 February 2022 Friendly	Sarajevo (Bosnia and Herzegovina)	2–3	(Ukraine) Kolos Kovalivka	Antalya, Turkey
15:00 TRT (UTC+3)	Čataković 83', 88'	Report	Totovytskyi 16'; Nuriyev 62'; Carioca 77'

19 February 2022 Friendly	Sarajevo (Bosnia and Herzegovina)	5–1	(Bosnia and Herzegovina) Goražde	Butmir
14:30 CET (UTC+1)	Bagarić 20', 42', 60'; Ramić 63'; Šabanović 86'	Report	Pljevljak 47'	Stadium: Butmir Training Centre

== Competitions ==
=== Overview ===
Competition	First match	Last match	Starting round	Final position	Record							
Competition	First match	Last match	Starting round	Final position	Pld	W	D	L	GF	GA	GD	Win %
Bosnian Premier League	19 July 2021	27 May 2022	Matchday 1	4th	33	13	7	13	37	33	+4	39.39
Bosnian Cup	29 September 2021	19 May 2022	First round	Runners-up	7	5	2	0	11	1	+10	71.43
Conference League	8 July 2021	15 July 2021	First qualifying round	First qualifying round	2	0	1	1	0	1	−1	0.00
Total					42	18	10	14	48	35	+13	42.86

Source: Competitions

=== Premier League of Bosnia and Herzegovina ===
==== League table ====
Pos	Team	Pld	W	D	L	GF	GA	GD	Pts	Qualification or relegation
2	Tuzla City	33	15	12	6	49	36	+13	57	Qualification to Europa Conference League first qualifying round
3	Borac Banja Luka	33	13	15	5	44	34	+10	54	Qualification to Europa Conference League first qualifying round
4	Sarajevo	33	13	7	13	37	33	+4	46	
5	Velež Mostar	33	13	8	12	42	37	+5	44 (Note: Velež were deducted 3 points due to their match against Borac in Round 10 being stopped because of Velež's fans invading the pitch.)	Qualification to Europa Conference League second qualifying round (Note: Velež qualified for the Europa Conference League second qualifying round by winning the 2021–22 Bosnian Cup.)
6	Željezničar	33	9	16	8	28	29	−1	43	

Source: Rezultati.com
Rules for classification: 1) Points; 2) Goal difference; 3) Goals scored; 4) Head-to-head points; 5) Head-to-head goal difference; 6) Head-to-head away goals (only if two teams); 7) Head-to-head goals scored; 8) Goal difference; 9) Play-off. (Criteria 2 and 3 are not used to decide champion, UEFA competition qualification, or relegation)

==== Results summary ====
Overall								Home						Away					
Pld	W	D	L	GF	GA	GD	Pts	W	D	L	GF	GA	GD	W	D	L	GF	GA	GD
33	13	7	13	37	33	+4	46	8	4	5	24	12	+12	5	3	8	13	21	−8

Source: Sportsport.ba

==== Results by round ====
Round	1	2	3	4	5	6	7	8	9	10	11	12	13	14	15	16	17	18	19	20	21	22	23	24	25	26	27	28	29	30	31	32	33
Ground	H	A	H	A	H	A	H	A	H	H	A	A	H	A	H	A	H	A	H	A	A	H	H	A	H	A	H	A	H	H	A	H	A
Result	L	W	L	W	W	W	D	D	L	W	L	D	W	L	D	W	W	L	L	W	L	D	W	D	W	L	L	L	W	D	L	W	L
Position	9	5	9	4	4	4	4	4	4	3	3	3	3	4	5	3	3	3	4	4	4	4	4	4	4	4	4	4	4	4	4	4	4
Points	0	3	3	6	9	12	13	14	14	17	17	18	21	21	22	25	28	28	28	31	31	32	35	36	39	39	39	39	42	43	43	46	46

Source: Competitions
A = Away; H = Home; W = Win; D = Draw; L = Loss

==== Matches ====
19 July 2021 1	Sarajevo	1–2	Tuzla City	Sarajevo
18:00 CEST (UTC+2)	Kurdić 35', (yellow card) 90'; Pidro (yellow card) 65'; Palić (yellow card) 72'; Đokanović (yellow card) 82'	Report	Krpić 3', (yellow card) 90'; Džafić (yellow card) 56' (yellow-red card) 87', (goal) 80'	Stadium: Asim Ferhatović Hase Stadium; Attendance: 1,500; Referee: Ermin Sivac (Zenica)

25 July 2021 2	Posušje	0–2	Sarajevo	Posušje
17:00 CEST (UTC+2)	Barišić (yellow card) 29'; Bešlić (yellow card) 39'; Lučić (yellow card) 74'	Report	Cmiljanić 40', (yellow card) 56'; Baćak 72' (o.g.); Bešić (yellow card) 79'; Dizdarević (yellow card) 85'	Stadium: Mokri Dolac Stadium; Attendance: 3,000; Referee: Sabrija Topalović (Zenica)

31 July 2021 3	Sarajevo	0–2	Zrinjski Mostar	Sarajevo
21:00 CEST (UTC+2)	Kurdić (yellow card) 14'; Đokanović (yellow card) 39'; Dupovac (red card) 81'; Palić (yellow card) 87'	Report	Tičinović 25'; Bašić 35'; Juranović (yellow card) 70'	Stadium: Asim Ferhatović Hase Stadium; Attendance: 4,500; Referee: Elvis Mujić (Banovići)

8 August 2021 4	Rudar Prijedor	0–2	Sarajevo	Prijedor
17:00 CEST (UTC+2)		Report	Bagarić 23', (yellow card) 51'; Mandić 39' (o.g.); Pidro (yellow card) 56'; Dizdarević (yellow card) 86'	Stadium: Gradski stadion Attendance: 1,500; Referee: Antoni Bandić (Grude)

15 August 2021 5	Sarajevo	2–1	Radnik Bijeljina	Sarajevo
19:00 CEST (UTC+2)	Palić (yellow card) 8'; Bagarić 12'; Bodul 39' (pen.); Šabanović (yellow card) 44'	Report	Šubert (yellow card) 11'; Popara 65'; Motika (yellow card) 66'; Ristanović (yellow card) 88'	Stadium: Asim Ferhatović Hase Stadium; Attendance: 2,500; Referee: Aleksandar Njegomirović (Prnjavor)

21 August 2021 6	Sloboda Tuzla	1–2	Sarajevo	Tuzla
19:00 CEST (UTC+2)	Balić (yellow card) 27'; Kurtalić (yellow card) 33'; Osmić (yellow card) 39'; Veselinović (yellow card) 87'; Dž. Beganović 90'	Report	Bodul 15'; Đokanović (yellow card) 30'; Bagarić (yellow card) 43'; Ramić 47'; Cmiljanić (yellow card) 66'; Kobiljar (yellow card) 69'; Šabanović (yellow card) 79' (yellow-red card) 83'	Stadium: Tušanj City Stadium; Attendance: 5,000; Referee: Antoni Bandić (Grude)

27 August 2021 7	Sarajevo	0–0	Široki Brijeg	Sarajevo
20:00 CEST (UTC+2)	Kurdić (yellow card) 20'; Palić (yellow card) 21'; Ahmetović (yellow card) 90'	Report	Čuljak (yellow card) 26'; Llanos (yellow card) 42'; Medić (yellow card) 90+2'; Lasić (yellow card) 90+4'	Stadium: Asim Ferhatović Hase Stadium; Attendance: 2,750; Referee: Sabrija Topalović (Zenica)

10 September 2021 8	Velež Mostar	1–1	Sarajevo	Mostar
20:00 CEST (UTC+2)	Brandao 49'; Ovčina (yellow card) 52'; Hasanović (yellow card) 57'; Radovac (yellow card) 74'; Zeljković (yellow card) 90'	Report	Šabanović 54'; Dizdarević (yellow card) 57'; Dupovac (yellow card) 66'; Palić (yellow card) 81'	Stadium: Stadion Rođeni; Attendance: 2,000; Referee: Antoni Bandić (Grude)

17 September 2021 9	Sarajevo	0–1	Leotar	Sarajevo
18:00 CEST (UTC+2)	Šabanović (yellow card) 29'; Kurdić (yellow card) 33'; Cmiljanić (yellow card) 71'; Oremuš (yellow card) 82'; Velkoski (yellow card) 90+2'; Šahinović (yellow card) 90+5'	Report	Perišić (yellow card) 12'; Aćimović 66'; Andrić (yellow card) 74'; Prebiračević (yellow card) 90'	Stadium: Asim Ferhatović Hase Stadium; Attendance: 1,500; Referee: Zoran Grbić (Prijedor)

22 September 2021 10	Sarajevo	2–0	Željezničar	Sarajevo
20:30 CEST (UTC+2)	Ahmetović 31'; Trako (yellow card) 39'; Bodul 58', (yellow card) 79'; Ramić (yellow card) 60'; Bagarić (yellow card) 80'; Varešanović (yellow card) 80'; Šabanović (yellow card) 90'	Report	Subašić (yellow card) 11'; Crnčević (yellow card) 23'; Mekić (yellow card) 56'; Blažević (yellow card) 80'	Stadium: Asim Ferhatović Hase Stadium; Attendance: 11,000; Referee: Irfan Peljto (Sarajevo)

25 September 2021 11	Borac Banja Luka	1–0	Sarajevo	Banja Luka
19:00 CEST (UTC+2)	Begić (yellow card) 38'; Vranješ 47'; Vušurović (yellow card) 56'; Molls (yellow card) 60'; Dujaković (yellow card) 79'	Report	Trako (yellow card) 22'; Oremuš (yellow card) 41'; Kobiljar (yellow card) 60'; Ahmetović (yellow card) 67'	Stadium: Banja Luka City Stadium; Attendance: 8,000; Referee: Antoni Bandić (Grude)

3 October 2021 12	Tuzla City	1–1	Sarajevo	Tuzla
17:00 CEST (UTC+2)	Krpić 5'; Nukić (yellow card) 33'; Džafić (yellow card) 90'	Report	Hebibović 90'	Stadium: Tušanj City Stadium; Attendance: 1,500; Referee: Aleksandar Njegomirović (Prnjavor)

17 October 2021 13	Sarajevo	1–0	Posušje	Sarajevo
17:00 CEST (UTC+2)	Kapić 8'; Ramić (yellow card) 74'; Pidro (yellow card) 76'	Report	Bešlić (yellow card) 29'; Landeka (yellow card) 68' (yellow-red card) 84'; Barišić (red card) 88'	Stadium: Asim Ferhatović Hase Stadium; Attendance: 1,200; Referee: Josip Martinović (Čapljina)

23 October 2021 14	Zrinjski Mostar	1–0	Sarajevo	Mostar
17:00 CEST (UTC+2)	Juranović (yellow card) 8'; Bilbija 40'; Tešija (yellow card) 86'	Report	Bodul (yellow card) 32'; Ševelj (yellow card) 37'; Kobiljar (yellow card) 56'; Đokanović (yellow card) 71'; Oremuš (yellow card) 81'; Varešanović (yellow card) 87'	Stadium: Stadion pod Bijelim Brijegom; Attendance: 2,700; Referee: Elvis Mujić (Banovići)

30 October 2021 15	Sarajevo	1–1	Rudar Prijedor	Sarajevo
17:00 CEST (UTC+2)	Lazić 11', (yellow card) 53' (yellow-red card) 63'; Bagarić (yellow card) 70'	Report	Amoah 31'; Topolović (yellow card) 90'	Stadium: Asim Ferhatović Hase Stadium; Attendance: 2,200; Referee: Mateo Musa (Čitluk)

6 November 2021 16	Radnik Bijeljina	0–1	Sarajevo	Bijeljina
17:00 CET (UTC+1)	Vasić (yellow card) 90'	Report	Đokanović 18'; Dupovac (yellow card) 53'; Palić (yellow card) 67'; Hebibović (red card) 68'; Cmiljanić (yellow card) 73'; Ševelj (yellow card) 81'; Kurdić (yellow card) 90'	Stadium: Gradski stadion Attendance: 200; Referee: Aleksandar Njegomirović (Prnjavor)

20 November 2021 17	Sarajevo	1–0	Sloboda Tuzla	Sarajevo
15:00 CET (UTC+1)	Lazić (yellow card) 14'; Kobiljar (yellow card) 51'; Dupovac (yellow card) 76'; Cmiljanić 90+2'	Report	Predragović (yellow card) 17'; Čivić (yellow card) 56'; A. Beganović (yellow card) 77'	Stadium: Asim Ferhatović Hase Stadium; Attendance: 1,000; Referee: Danijel Bojo (Kiseljak)

28 November 2021 18	Široki Brijeg	2–1	Sarajevo	Široki Brijeg
15:00 CET (UTC+1)	Mujan 51'; Vukoja (yellow card) 57', (goal) 86' (pen.); Musa (yellow card) 57'; Lukić (yellow card) 87'	Report	Bagarić 36'; Pidro (yellow card) 49'; Bodul (red card) 57'; Palić (yellow card) 88'	Stadium: Pecara Stadium; Attendance: 850; Referee: Dragan Petrović (Banja Luka)

4 December 2021 19	Sarajevo	0–2	Velež Mostar	Sarajevo
13:00 CET (UTC+1)	Oremuš (yellow card) 16'; Dupovac (yellow card) 65'; Šabanović (yellow card) 81' (yellow-red card) 83'; Velkoski (yellow card) 83'	Report	Anđušić 9'; Zajmović 17'; Bogdanović (yellow card) 31'; Drina (yellow card) 43'; Isić (yellow card) 78'; Vehabović (yellow card) 87'	Stadium: Asim Ferhatović Hase Stadium; Attendance: 2,000; Referee: Antoni Bandić (Grude)

26 February 2022 20	Leotar	0–2	Sarajevo	Trebinje
13:00 CET (UTC+1)	Santrač (yellow card) 54'; Sekulović (yellow card) 71'; Dujaković (yellow card) 78'	Report	Suljić 1', (yellow card) 21'; Bagarić 12'; Đokanović (yellow card) 34'; Šećerović (yellow card) 56'; Palić (yellow card) 84'	Stadium: Police Stadium; Attendance: 500; Referee: Antoni Bandić (Grude)

5 March 2022 21	Željezničar	2–0	Sarajevo	Sarajevo
17:00 CET (UTC+1)	Bekrić (yellow card) 16'; Hodžić 31'; Malić (yellow card) 44'; Vučenović (yellow card) 75'; Hajdarević (yellow card) 88'; Zec 89', (yellow card) 89'	Report	Đokanović (yellow card) 39'; Dupovac (red card) 45'; Velkoski (yellow card) 76'	Stadium: Grbavica Stadium; Attendance: 8,000; Referee: Haris Kaljanac (Sarajevo)

12 March 2022 22	Sarajevo	1–1	Borac Banja Luka	Sarajevo
15:00 CET (UTC+1)	Suljić 3'; Palić (yellow card) 7'; Bagarić (yellow card) 54'; Šećerović (yellow card) 65'	Report	Brkić (yellow card) 48'; Ćorić (yellow card) 56'; Lukić 59'; Molls (yellow card) 76'	Stadium: Asim Ferhatović Hase Stadium; Attendance: 2,500; Referee: Irfan Peljto (Sarajevo)

20 March 2022 23	Sarajevo	6–0	Posušje	Sarajevo
13:00 CET (UTC+1)	Varešanović 24', 29'; Bagarić (yellow card) 27'; Dupovac (red card) 27'; Hebibović (yellow card) 29', (goal) 35'; Lazić (yellow card) 30', (goal) 52'; Čataković 67'; Suljić 75'	Report	Ljubić (yellow card) 33'; Janković (yellow card) 59'	Stadium: Asim Ferhatović Hase Stadium; Attendance: 3,600; Referee: Zoran Grbić (Prijedor)

2 April 2022 24	Leotar	1–1	Sarajevo	Trebinje
15:00 CEST (UTC+2)	Dujaković 9'; Stanojević (yellow card) 13'; Milović (yellow card) 24'; Perišić (yellow card) 45'	Report	Čataković 16'; Pidro (yellow card) 34'; Mujakić (yellow card) 67'	Stadium: Police Stadium; Attendance: 500; Referee: Mirza Kazlagić (Cazin)

10 April 2022 25	Sarajevo	6–0	Rudar Prijedor	Sarajevo
13:00 CEST (UTC+2)	Suljić 3'; Varešanović 10', 47'; Đokanović 60'; Avramovski 64'; Ramić 80'	Report		Stadium: Asim Ferhatović Hase Stadium; Attendance: 1,400; Referee: Mateo Musa (Čitluk)

16 April 2022 26	Zrinjski Mostar	4–0	Sarajevo	Mostar
19:00 CEST (UTC+2)	Janković 15'; Bašić (yellow card) 36'; Bilbija 52'; Lazić 62' (o.g.); Jukić 76'	Report	Mujakić (yellow card) 41'; Šabanović (yellow card) 67'	Stadium: Stadion pod Bijelim Brijegom; Attendance: 5,000; Referee: Ermin Sivac (Zenica)

23 April 2022 27	Sarajevo	0–1	Tuzla City	Sarajevo
17:00 CEST (UTC+2)	Šabanović (yellow card) 45'; Mujakić (yellow card) 90'	Report	Karjašević (yellow card) 24'; Džafić (yellow card) 34', (goal) 35'; Mendeš (yellow card) 59'; Mešinović (yellow card) 68'; Vukušić (yellow card) 88'; Čeliković (yellow card) 90'	Stadium: Asim Ferhatović Hase Stadium; Attendance: 5,100; Referee: Frano Jelić (Široki Brijeg)

30 April 2022 28	Borac Banja Luka	1–0	Sarajevo	Banja Luka
17:00 CEST (UTC+2)	Milojević (yellow card) 20'; Lukić 33'; Cucin (yellow card) 90+1'; Ćetković (yellow card) 90+3'	Report	Varešanović (yellow card) 20'; Velkoski (yellow card) 20'; Avramovski (yellow card) 33'; Kobiljar (yellow card) 74'	Stadium: Banja Luka City Stadium; Attendance: 4,500; Referee: Luka Bilbija (Prijedor)

6 May 2022 29	Sarajevo	1–0	Radnik Bijeljina	Sarajevo
18:00 CEST (UTC+2)	Suljić (yellow card) 30'; Čataković 45'; Ramić (yellow card) 73'	Report	Maksimović (yellow card) 30'; Blagojević (yellow card) 58'	Stadium: Asim Ferhatović Hase Stadium; Attendance: 1,300; Referee: Velimir Drinić (Modriča)

10 May 2022 30	Sarajevo	1–1	Željezničar	Sarajevo
20:00 CEST (UTC+2)	Suljić 10'; Ahmetović (yellow card) 66'	Report	Kosorić (yellow card) 28'; Galić (yellow card) 41'; Dupovac 66' (o.g.); Hajdarević (yellow card) 75'; Štilić (yellow card) 81'; Malić (yellow card) 90'	Stadium: Asim Ferhatović Hase Stadium; Attendance: 7,000; Referee: Admir Musić (Sarajevo)

14 May 2022 31	Široki Brijeg	2–0	Sarajevo	Široki Brijeg
17:00 CEST (UTC+2)	Vukoja 52'; Mujan 81'; Medić (yellow card) 85'	Report	Oremuš (yellow card) 33'; Trako (yellow card) 56'; Palić (yellow card) 61'	Stadium: Pecara Stadium; Attendance: 1,000; Referee: Zoran Grbić (Prijedor)

22 May 2022 32	Sarajevo	1–0	Sloboda Tuzla	Sarajevo
16:30 CEST (UTC+2)	Ahmetović (yellow card) 13', (goal) 44'; I. Ramić (yellow card) 39'; Kapić (yellow card) 50'; Oremuš (yellow card) 55'; Lazić (yellow card) 63'	Report	Osmić (yellow card) 16'	Stadium: Asim Ferhatović Hase Stadium; Attendance: 1,000; Referee: Miloš Gigović (Gradiška)

27 May 2022 33	Velež Mostar	3–0	Sarajevo	Mostar
20:00 CEST (UTC+2)	Zajmović 26', 60', 63', (yellow card) 27'; Hasanović (yellow card) 76'	Report	Suljić (yellow card) 12'; Šećerović (yellow card) 34'; Varešanović (yellow card) 45+3'	Stadium: Stadion Rođeni; Attendance: 3,500; Referee: Dražen Marić (Bijeljina)

=== Cup of Bosnia and Herzegovina ===
==== Round of 32 ====
29 September 2021	Modriča	1–4	Sarajevo	Modriča
16:00 CEST (UTC+2)	Kurteši (yellow card) 51'; Trifković 59'	Report	Fanimo 18' (pen.), 68'; Hebibović 20'; Šabanović 39'	Stadium: Stadion Dr. Milan Jelić; Attendance: 500; Referee: Zoran Grbić (Prijedor)

==== Round of 16 ====
27 October 2021	Sarajevo	1–0	Ljubić Prnjavor	Sarajevo
17:30 CEST (UTC+2)	Oremuš (yellow card) 17'; Palić (yellow card) 21'; Cmiljanić (yellow card) 44'; Hebibović (yellow card) 79'; Dervišagić 84', (yellow card) 84'	Report	Miljanović (yellow card) 79'; Žižak (yellow card) 83'; Borovčanin (yellow card) 90'	Stadium: Asim Ferhatović Hase Stadium; Attendance: 1,000; Referee: Dražen Marić (Bijeljina)

==== Quarter-finals ====
2 March 2022 First leg	Sarajevo	2–0	Sloboda Tuzla	Sarajevo
17:00 CET (UTC+1)	Čataković 4'; Ahmetović 47'; Varešanović (yellow card) 80'; Kapić (yellow card) 85'	Report	Kapetanović (yellow card) 83'	Stadium: Asim Ferhatović Hase Stadium; Attendance: 2,800; Referee: Frano Jelić (Široki Brijeg)

16 March 2022 Second leg	Sloboda Tuzla	0–0	Sarajevo	Tuzla
14:00 CET (UTC+1)	Beganović (yellow card) 49'; Karišik (yellow card) 66'; Osmić (yellow card) 87'	Report	Pidro (yellow card) 44'	Stadium: Tušanj City Stadium; Attendance: 350; Referee: Danijel Bojo (Kiseljak)

==== Semi-finals ====
6 April 2022 First leg	Sarajevo	2–0	Igman Konjic	Sarajevo
16:00 CEST (UTC+2)	Avramovski 28'; Čataković 71'	Report	Bešagić (yellow card) 42'	Stadium: Asim Ferhatović Hase Stadium; Attendance: 3,500; Referee: Dražen Marić (Bijeljina)

20 April 2022 Second leg	Igman Konjic	0–2	Sarajevo	Sarajevo
14:00 CEST (UTC+2)	Velić (yellow card) 23'; Ljuca (yellow card) 25'	Report	Velkoski 28'; Šabanović (yellow card) 47'; Varešanović 90'	Stadium: Grbavica Stadium; Attendance: 1,200; Referee: Mirza Kazlagić (Cazin)

==== Final ====
19 May 2022	Sarajevo	0–0 (3–4 p)	Velež Mostar	Zenica
19:00 CEST (UTC+2)	Dupovac (yellow card) 19'; Šabanović (yellow card) 25' (yellow-red card) 90'; Đokanović (yellow card) 54'; Lazić (yellow card) 59'; Šećerović (yellow card) 86'	Report	Hasanović (yellow card) 22'; Pršeš (yellow card) 38'; Zvonić (yellow card) 48'	Stadium: Bilino Polje Stadium; Attendance: 10,000; Referee: Irfan Peljto (Sarajevo)
	Penalties
	Suljić (penalty scored); Varešanović (penalty missed); Šećerović (penalty scored); Oremuš (penalty missed); Bodul (penalty scored)		(penalty scored) Ovčina; (penalty scored) Haskić; (penalty missed) Zvonić; (penalty scored) Pršeš; (penalty scored) Brandao

=== UEFA Europa Conference League ===
Sarajevo entered the UEFA Europa Conference League at the first qualifying round.

==== First qualifying round ====
8 July 2021 First Leg	Milsami Orhei (Moldova)	0–0	(Bosnia and Herzegovina) Sarajevo	Orhei, Moldova
20:00 EEST (UTC+3)	Amougui (yellow card) 71'	Report	Šabanović (yellow card) 83'	Stadium: CSR Orhei; Attendance: 1,100; Referee: Yasar Kemal Ugurlu (Turkey)

15 July 2021 Second Leg	Sarajevo (Bosnia and Herzegovina)	0–1 (0–1 agg.)	(Moldova) Milsami Orhei	Sarajevo, Bosnia and Herzegovina
21:00 CEST (UTC+2)	Oremuš (yellow card) 88'	Report	Gînsari 19'; Antoniuc (yellow card) 41'; Lambarschi (yellow card) 55'; Bolohan (yellow card) 75'; Istrati (yellow card) 79'	Stadium: Asim Ferhatović Hase Stadium; Attendance: 4,588; Referee: Paul Mclaughlin (Republic of Ireland)

== Statistics ==
=== Squad appearances and goals ===
No.	Pos	Nat	Player	Total		Premier League		Cup of BiH		Conference League	
No.	Pos	Nat	Player	Apps	Goals	Apps	Goals	Apps	Goals	Apps	Goals
Goalkeepers
1	GK	(Bosnia and Herzegovina) BIH	Muhamed Šahinović	1	0	1	0	0	0	0	0
26	GK	(Bosnia and Herzegovina) BIH	Adnan Kanurić	3	0	1	0	0	0	2	0
35	GK	(Bosnia and Herzegovina) BIH	Belmin Dizdarević	38	0	31	0	7	0	0	0
Defenders
3	DF	(Bosnia and Herzegovina) BIH	Selmir Pidro	35	0	28	0	4+1	0	2	0
4	DF	(Bosnia and Herzegovina) BIH	Halid Šabanović	33	2	23+3	1	5	1	2	0
5	DF	(Bosnia and Herzegovina) BIH	Hamza Bešić	1	0	0+1	0	0	0	0	0
5	DF	(Serbia) SRB	Darko Lazić	20	2	14+2	2	3+1	0	0	0
19	DF	(Bosnia and Herzegovina) BIH	Nihad Mujakić	17	0	12	0	5	0	0	0
21	DF	(Bosnia and Herzegovina) BIH	Dino Islamović	2	0	0+1	0	1	0	0	0
24	DF	(Croatia) CRO	Vicko Ševelj	6	0	4+1	0	1	0	0	0
29	DF	(Bosnia and Herzegovina) BIH	Amer Dupovac	27	0	22+1	0	2	0	2	0
33	DF	(Bosnia and Herzegovina) BIH	Muharem Trako	12	0	7+5	0	0	0	0	0
40	DF	(Bosnia and Herzegovina) BIH	Armin Imamović	5	0	0+4	0	0+1	0	0	0
Midfielders
6	MF	(Croatia) CRO	Mirko Oremuš	19	0	9+6	0	1+1	0	2	0
7	MF	(Bosnia and Herzegovina) BIH	Anel Hebibović	30	3	15+9	2	3+2	1	1	0
8	MF	(Bosnia and Herzegovina) BIH	Andrej Đokanović	37	2	27+2	2	5+1	0	2	0
14	MF	(Bosnia and Herzegovina) BIH	Tarik Ramić	21	2	7+9	2	2+1	0	0+2	0
16	MF	(Bosnia and Herzegovina) BIH	Adnan Šećerović	15	0	6+5	0	1+3	0	0	0
17	MF	(Bosnia and Herzegovina) BIH	Dal Varešanović	31	5	12+10	4	5+2	1	0+2	0
20	MF	(Bosnia and Herzegovina) BIH	Đani Salčin	4	0	0+2	0	0	0	1+1	0
25	MF	(Bosnia and Herzegovina) BIH	Kerim Palić	27	0	12+8	0	5+1	0	0+1	0
27	MF	(North Macedonia) MKD	Daniel Avramovski	8	2	5+1	1	2	1	0	0
30	MF	(Bosnia and Herzegovina) BIH	Haris Konjalić	0	0	0	0	0	0	0	0
50	MF	(Bosnia and Herzegovina) BIH	Muhamed Buljubašić	3	0	0+2	0	0+1	0	0	0
88	MF	(Bosnia and Herzegovina) BIH	Rifet Kapić	24	1	18+1	1	3+2	0	0	0
96	MF	(Bosnia and Herzegovina) BIH	Rijad Kobiljar	28	0	11+14	0	1+2	0	0	0
99	MF	(Bosnia and Herzegovina) BIH	Asmir Suljić	17	5	12	5	5	0	0	0
Forwards
9	FW	(Bosnia and Herzegovina) BIH	Mersudin Ahmetović	29	3	10+15	2	3+1	1	0	0
10	FW	(Austria) AUT	Darko Bodul	27	3	15+8	3	0+4	0	0	0
11	FW	(North Macedonia) MKD	Krste Velkoski	26	1	5+14	0	3+2	1	2	0
18	FW	(Montenegro) MNE	Boris Cmiljanić	16	2	5+10	2	1	0	0	0
22	FW	(Croatia) CRO	Dražen Bagarić	36	4	19+9	4	5+3	0	0	0
28	FW	(Bosnia and Herzegovina) BIH	Aldin Mešić	0	0	0	0	0	0	0	0
30	FW	(Bosnia and Herzegovina) BIH	Irfan Ramić	3	0	2+1	0	0	0	0	0
97	FW	(Bosnia and Herzegovina) BIH	Hamza Čataković	17	5	7+6	3	2+2	2	0	0
Players who have made an appearance this season but have left the club
27	DF	(Bosnia and Herzegovina) BIH	Numan Kurdić	19	1	15+1	1	1	0	2	0
31	MF	(Bosnia and Herzegovina) BIH	Tino-Sven Sušić	5	0	2+1	0	0	0	2	0
23	FW	(Bosnia and Herzegovina) BIH	Kenan Dervišagić	10	1	1+5	0	0+2	1	0+2	0
38	FW	(England) ENG	Matthias Fanimo	10	2	4+2	0	2	2	2	0

Number after the "+" sign represents the number of games player started the game on the bench and was substituted on.

=== Goalscorers ===
Rank	No.	Pos.	Nat.	Player	Premier League	Cup of BiH	Conference League	Total
1	17	MF	(Bosnia and Herzegovina)	Dal Varešanović	4	1	0	5
1	97	FW	(Bosnia and Herzegovina)	Hamza Čataković	3	2	0	5
1	99	MF	(Bosnia and Herzegovina)	Asmir Suljić	5	0	0	5
4	22	FW	(Croatia)	Dražen Bagarić	4	0	0	4
5	7	MF	(Bosnia and Herzegovina)	Anel Hebibović	2	1	0	3
5	9	FW	(Bosnia and Herzegovina)	Mersudin Ahmetović	2	1	0	3
5	10	FW	(Austria)	Darko Bodul	3	0	0	3
8	4	DF	(Bosnia and Herzegovina)	Halid Šabanović	1	1	0	2
8	8	MF	(Bosnia and Herzegovina)	Andrej Đokanović	2	0	0	2
8	5	DF	(Serbia)	Darko Lazić	2	0	0	2
8	14	MF	(Bosnia and Herzegovina)	Tarik Ramić	2	0	0	2
8	18	FW	(Montenegro)	Boris Cmiljanić	2	0	0	2
8	27	MF	(North Macedonia)	Daniel Avramovski	1	1	0	2
8	38	FW	(England)	Matthias Fanimo	0	2	0	2
15	11	FW	(North Macedonia)	Krste Velkoski	0	1	0	1
15	23	FW	(Bosnia and Herzegovina)	Kenan Dervišagić	0	1	0	1
15	27	DF	(Bosnia and Herzegovina)	Numan Kurdić	1	0	0	1
15	88	MF	(Bosnia and Herzegovina)	Rifet Kapić	1	0	0	1
Own goals					2	0	0	2
Total					37	11	0	48

=== Assists ===
Rank	No.	Pos.	Nat.	Player	Premier League	Cup of BiH	Conference League	Total
1	22	FW	(Croatia)	Dražen Bagarić	3	3	0	6
2	97	FW	(Bosnia and Herzegovina)	Hamza Čataković	3	1	0	4
3	10	FW	(Austria)	Darko Bodul	3	0	0	3
3	27	MF	(North Macedonia)	Daniel Avramovski	3	0	0	3
5	3	DF	(Bosnia and Herzegovina)	Selmir Pidro	2	0	0	2
5	4	DF	(Bosnia and Herzegovina)	Halid Šabanović	2	0	0	2
5	6	MF	(Croatia)	Mirko Oremuš	2	0	0	2
5	16	MF	(Bosnia and Herzegovina)	Adnan Šećerović	1	1	0	2
5	22	FW	(Croatia)	Dražen Bagarić	2	0	0	2
5	25	MF	(Bosnia and Herzegovina)	Kerim Palić	1	1	0	2
5	96	MF	(Bosnia and Herzegovina)	Rijad Kobiljar	1	1	0	2
12	7	MF	(Bosnia and Herzegovina)	Anel Hebibović	0	1	0	1
12	29	DF	(Bosnia and Herzegovina)	Amer Dupovac	0	1	0	1
12	38	FW	(England)	Matthias Fanimo	0	1	0	1
12	99	MF	(Bosnia and Herzegovina)	Asmir Suljić	1	0	0	1
Total					24	10	0	34

=== Clean sheets ===
Rank	No.	Nat.	Player	Premier League	Cup of BiH	Conference League	Total
1	35	(Bosnia and Herzegovina)	Belmin Dizdarević	12	6	0	18
2	26	(Bosnia and Herzegovina)	Adnan Kanurić	0	0	1	1
Total				12	6	1	19

=== Disciplinary record ===
Includes all competitive matches and only players that got booked throughout the season. The list is sorted by shirt number, and then position.

N	P	Nat.	Name	Premier League			Cup of BiH			Conference League			Others			Total			Notes
N	P	Nat.	Name	Yellow card	Second yellow card	Red card	Yellow card	Second yellow card	Red card	Yellow card	Second yellow card	Red card	Yellow card	Second yellow card	Red card	Yellow card	Second yellow card	Red card	Notes
1	GK	(Bosnia and Herzegovina)	Muhamed Šahinović	1												1			
3	DF	(Bosnia and Herzegovina)	Selmir Pidro	5			1									6			
4	DF	(Bosnia and Herzegovina)	Halid Šabanović	5	2		1	1		1						7	3		
5	DF	(Bosnia and Herzegovina)	Hamza Bešić	1												1			
5	DF	(Serbia)	Darko Lazić	3	1			1								3	2		
6	MF	(Croatia)	Mirko Oremuš	6			1			1						8			
7	MF	(Bosnia and Herzegovina)	Anel Hebibović	1		1	1									2		1	
8	MF	(Bosnia and Herzegovina)	Andrej Đokanović	6			1									7			
9	FW	(Bosnia and Herzegovina)	Mersudin Ahmetović	4												4			
10	FW	(Austria)	Darko Bodul	2		1										2		1	
11	FW	(North Macedonia)	Krste Velkoski	4												4			
14	MF	(Bosnia and Herzegovina)	Tarik Ramić	3												3			
16	MF	(Bosnia and Herzegovina)	Adnan Šećerović	3				1								3	1		
17	MF	(Bosnia and Herzegovina)	Dal Varešanović	4			1									5			
18	FW	(Montenegro)	Boris Cmiljanić	4			1									5			
19	DF	(Bosnia and Herzegovina)	Nihad Mujakić	3												3			
22	FW	(Croatia)	Dražen Bagarić	6												6			
23	FW	(Bosnia and Herzegovina)	Kenan Dervišagić				1									1			
24	DF	(Croatia)	Vicko Ševelj	2												2			
25	MF	(Bosnia and Herzegovina)	Kerim Palić	10			1									11			
27	DF	(Bosnia and Herzegovina)	Numan Kurdić	5												5			
27	MF	(North Macedonia)	Daniel Avramovski	1												1			
29	DF	(Bosnia and Herzegovina)	Amer Dupovac	4		3	1									5		3	
30	FW	(Bosnia and Herzegovina)	Irfan Ramić	1												1			
33	DF	(Bosnia and Herzegovina)	Muharem Trako	3												3			
35	GK	(Bosnia and Herzegovina)	Belmin Dizdarević	3												3			
88	MF	(Bosnia and Herzegovina)	Rifet Kapić	1			1									2			
96	MF	(Bosnia and Herzegovina)	Rijad Kobiljar	5												5			
99	MF	(Bosnia and Herzegovina)	Asmir Suljić	3												3			

Source: Competitive matches and fksarajevo.ba
Ordered by (red card) , (second yellow card) and (yellow card)
(yellow card) = Number of bookings; (second yellow card) = Number of sending offs after a second yellow card; (red card) = Number of sending offs by a direct red card.
