= 2026–27 Alanyaspor season =

Alanyaspor
2026–27 season
- President: Hasan Çavuşoğlu
- Head coach: João Pereira
- Stadium: Alanya Oba Stadium
- Süper Lig: 5th
- Turkish Cup: Third round
- Top goalscorer: League: Arda Usluoğlu (2); All: Arda Usluoğlu (2)

The 2026–27 season is the 79th season in the history of Alanyaspor, and the club's eleventh consecutive season in Süper Lig. In addition to the domestic league, the team is scheduled to participate in the Turkish Cup.

== Transfers ==
=== In ===
Date	Pos.	Player	From	Fee	Notes	Ref.
6 July 2026	FW	(Tunisia) Omar Ben Ali	(Tunisia) Sfaxien	€1,2M		
8 August 2026	DM	(Turkey) Baran Ali Gezek	(Turkey) Kayserispor	€480,000		
8 August 2026	LW	(Turkey) Şahin Dik	(Turkey) Giresunspor	€91,000		
21 August 2026	FW	(Cambodia) Iván Cédric	(Turkey) Vanspor	€1,1M		

=== Loans in ===
Date	Pos.	Player	From	Fee	Notes	Ref.
24 August 2026	MF	(Spain) Paolo Fernandes	(Greece) AEK Athens		Includes option to buy	

=== Out ===
Date	Pos.	Player	From	Fee	Notes	Ref.
2 September 2026	DF	(Turkey) Ümit Akdağ	(Turkey) Beşiktaş	€7M		
3 September 2026	GK	(Turkey) Yusuf Karagöz	(Turkey) 12 Bingölspor	€86,000		

=== Loans out ===
Date	Pos.	Player	To	Notes	Ref.
21 July 2026	DF	(Brazil) Bruno Viana	(China) Qingdao West Coast		

== Players ==
As of 21 September 2026

No.	Name	Nat.	Pos.	Date of birth (Age)	Previous club
Goalkeepers
1	Mahmut Can Kara	(Turkey)	GK	1 January 2006 (age 20)	Academy
23	Mert Furkan Bayram	(Turkey)	GK	2 January 2005 (age 21)	Sarıyer
48	Paulo Victor	(Brazil)	GK	12 January 1987 (age 39)	Al-Rayyan
Defenders
3	Nuno Lima	(Portugal)	CB	16 March 2001 (age 25)	Paços Ferreira
4	Bedirhan Özyurt	(Turkey)	CB	25 March 2003 (age 23)	İstanbul Başakşehir
5	Fidan Aliti	(Kosovo)	CB	3 October 1993 (age 33)	Zurich
20	Fatih Aksoy	(Turkey)	CB	6 November 1997 (age 28)	Beşiktaş
44	Bilal Demirağ	(Turkey)	CB	27 April 2009 (age 17)	Altınordu
Midfielders
7	İbrahim Kaya	(Turkey)	AM	9 March 2001 (age 25)	Bandırmaspor
8	Enes Keskin	(Turkey)	RM	4 June 2001 (age 25)	Pendikspor
10	Ianis Hagi	(Romania)	AM	22 October 1998 (age 27)	Rangers
11	Ruan	(Brazil)	LM	3 May 2005 (age 21)	Portimonense
12	Meschak Elia	(Democratic Republic of the Congo)	AM	6 August 1997 (age 29)	Young Boys
14	Emre Demir	(Turkey)	AM	15 January 2004 (age 22)	Fenerbahçe
16	Hwang Ui-jo	(South Korea)	AM	28 August 1992 (age 34)	Nottingham
26	İzzet Çelik	(Turkey)	CM	20 June 2004 (age 22)	Adana Demirspor
32	Arouna Soro	(Ivory Coast)	AM	12 July 2007 (age 19)	USC Bassam
42	Gaius Makouta	(Republic of the Congo)	DM	25 July 1997 (age 29)	Boavista
55	Baran Ali Gezek	(Turkey)	DM	26 August 2005 (age 21)	Kayserispor
58	Maestro	(Angola)	DM	4 August 2003 (age 23)	Adana Demirspor
88	Yusuf Özdemir	(Turkey)	LM	10 January 2001 (age 25)	İnegölspor
94	Florent Hadergjonaj	(Kosovo)	RM	31 July 1994 (age 32)	Kasımpaşa
Forwards
9	Omar Ben Ali	(Tunisia)	FW	22 April 2005 (age 21)	Sfaxien
17	Arda Usluoğlu	(Turkey)	FW	12 October 2006 (age 19)	Bucaspor 1928
19	Iván Cédric	(Cameroon)	FW	22 December 2001 (age 24)	Vanspor
22	Paolo Fernandes	(Spain)	RW	9 August 1998 (age 28)	AEK Athens
28	Şahin Dik	(Turkey)	LW	7 February 2004 (age 22)	Giresunspor

== Competitions ==
=== Overall record ===
Competition	First match	Last match	Starting round	Record							
Competition	First match	Last match	Starting round	Pld	W	D	L	GF	GA	GD	Win %
Süper Lig	15 August 2026	TBD	Matchday 1	6	3	2	1	8	6	+2	50.00
Turkish Cup	December 2026	TBD	Fourth round	0	0	0	0	0	0	+0	—
Total				6	3	2	1	8	6	+2	50.00

Last updated: 19 September 2026
Source: Competitions

== Competitions ==
=== Overall record ===
Competition	First match	Last match	Starting round	Record							
Competition	First match	Last match	Starting round	Pld	W	D	L	GF	GA	GD	Win %
Süper Lig	15 August 2026	TBD	Matchday 1	6	3	2	1	8	6	+2	50.00
Turkish Cup	December 2026	TBD	Fourth round	0	0	0	0	0	0	+0	—
Total				6	3	2	1	8	6	+2	50.00

Last updated: 19 September 2026
Source: Competitions

=== Süper Lig ===
Pos	Team	Pld	W	D	L	GF	GA	GD	Pts	Qualification or relegation
3	Beşiktaş	6	4	0	2	14	7	+7	12	Qualification for the Europa League second qualifying round
4	Kocaelispor	6	4	0	2	7	4	+3	12	Qualification for the Conference League second qualifying round
5	Alanyaspor	6	3	2	1	8	6	+2	11	
6	Fenerbahçe	6	3	1	2	16	6	+10	10	
7	Trabzonspor	6	3	1	2	13	5	+8	10	

Updated to match(es) played on 10 October 2026. Source: Süper Lig
Rules for classification: 1) Points; 2) Head-to-head points; 3) Head-to-head goal difference; 4) Head-to-head goals scored; 5) Goal difference; 6) Goals scored; 7) Play-off.
(Note: Head-to-head record is used only after all the matches between the teams in question have been played)

==== Results summary ====
Overall								Home						Away					
Pld	W	D	L	GF	GA	GD	Pts	W	D	L	GF	GA	GD	W	D	L	GF	GA	GD
6	3	2	1	8	6	+2	11	1	1	0	3	2	+1	2	1	1	5	4	+1

Last updated: 19 September 2026.
Source: TFF.org

Pld = Matches played; W = Matches won; D = Matches drawn; L = Matches lost; GF = Goals for; GA = Goals against; GD = Goal difference; Pts = Points

==== Results by round ====
Round	1	2	3	4	5	6	7	8	9	10	11	12	13	14	15	16	17	18	19	20	21	22	23	24	25	26	27	28	29	30	31	32	33	34
Ground	A	H	A	A	H	A	H	A	H	A	H	A	H	A	H	A	H	H	A	H	H	A	H	A	H	A	H	A	H	A	H	A	H	A
Result	D	W	L	W	D	W																												
Position	10	5	12	7	8	5																												

Updated to match(es) played on 19 September 2026. Source: TFF.org
A = Away; H = Home; W = Win; D = Draw; L = Loss; P = Postponed

==== Matches ====
15 August 2026 1	Gaziantep	1–1	Alanyaspor	Gaziantep
21:30 TRT (UTC+3)	Sorescu 61'	Report	Duarte 20'	Stadium: Gaziantep Stadium; Referee: Yasin Kol

23 August 2026 2	Alanyaspor	1–0	Beşiktaş	Alanya, Antalya
21:30 TRT (UTC+3)	Lima 73'	Report		Stadium: Alanya Oba Stadium; Referee: Adnan Deniz Kayatepe

30 August 2026 3	Eyüpspor	2–1	Alanyaspor	Esenyurt, Istanbul
19:00 TRT (UTC+3)	Abdullahi 39'; Jules 90+4'	Report	Usluoğlu 1'	Stadium: Necmi Kadıoğlu Stadium; Referee: Cihan Aydın

7 September 2026 4	Çaykur Rizespor	0–1	Alanyaspor	Rize
20:00 TRT (UTC+3)		Report	Ariss 70' (o.g.)	Stadium: Rize City Stadium; Referee: Abdullah Buğra Taşkınsoy

12 September 2026 5	Alanyaspor	2–2	Göztepe	Alanya, Antalya
20:00 TRT (UTC+3)	Fernandes 63'; Makouta 75'	Report	Rhaldney 28'; Juan 73'	Stadium: Alanya Oba Stadium; Referee: Ozan Ergün

19 September 2026 6	Çorum	1–2	Alanyaspor	Çorum
17:00 TRT (UTC+3)	Ramírez 76'	Report	Makouta 67'; Usluoğlu 78'	Stadium: Çorum Şehir Stadium; Referee: Alper Akarsu

10 October 2026 7	Alanyaspor	0–0	Erzurumspor	Alanya, Antalya
16:00 TRT (UTC+3)	Elia (yellow card) 62'; Hadergjonaj (yellow card) 86'; Usluoğlu (yellow card) 90+6'	Report	Tozlu (yellow card) 29'; Ovacıklı (yellow card) 44'; Gërxhaliu (yellow card) 62'	Stadium: Alanya Oba Stadium; Referee: Davut Dakul Çelik

17 October 2026 8	Fenerbahçe	v	Alanyaspor	Kadıköy, Istanbul
19:00 TRT (UTC+3)		Report		Stadium: Şükrü Saraçoğlu Stadium

=== Turkish Cup ===
3T	v
TRT (UTC+3)
