= Halid Šabanović =

Bosnian footballer (born 1999)

Personal information
- Date of birth: 22 August 1999 (age 27)
- Place of birth: Sarajevo, Bosnia and Herzegovina
- Height: 1.82 m (6 ft 0 in)
- Position: Right-back

Team information
- Current team: Čelik Zenica
- Number: 24

Youth career
- 2010–2016: Olimpic
- 2016–2018: Sarajevo

Senior career*
Years	Team	Apps	(Gls)
2018–2022	Sarajevo	61	(2)
2021	→ Mladost Doboj Kakanj (loan)	11	(0)
2022–2025	Angers	15	(2)
2023–2025	Angers B	7	(0)
2024	→ Valenciennes (loan)	4	(0)
2026	Vukovar 1991	1	(0)
2026–	Čelik Zenica	7	(0)

International career
2017–2018	Bosnia and Herzegovina U19	7	(0)
2018–2019	Bosnia and Herzegovina U21	6	(0)
- * Club domestic league appearances and goals as of 24 October 2026

Halid Šabanović (Bosnian pronunciation: [xâːlid ʃabâːnoʋitɕ]; born 22 August 1999) is a Bosnian professional footballer who plays as a right-back for Bosnian Premier League club Čelik Zenica.

Šabanović started his professional career at Sarajevo, who loaned him to Mladost Doboj Kakanj in 2021. In 2022, he joined Angers.

== Club career ==
=== Sarajevo ===
Šabanović started playing football at a local club, before joining youth academy of his hometown club Sarajevo in 2016. In July 2017, he signed his first professional contract with the team. He made his professional debut against Krupa on 3 March 2018 at the age of 18. On 22 September, he scored his first professional goal against the same opponent. He won his first trophy with the club on 15 May 2019, by beating Široki Brijeg in Bosnian Cup final.

In January 2020, Šabanović signed a new two-year deal with Sarajevo.

In January 2021, he was loaned to Mladost Doboj Kakanj until the end of season.

=== Angers ===
In June 2022, Šabanović was transferred to French outfit Angers for an undisclosed fee. He made his official debut for the team on 7 August against Nantes. On 8 April 2023, in a league match against Lille, he scored his first goal for the team.

On 30 January 2024, Šabanović was loaned by Valenciennes until the end of the season.

== International career ==
Šabanović represented Bosnia and Herzegovina at various youth levels.

== Career statistics ==
=== Club ===
As of match played 28 October 2026

Appearances and goals by club, season and competition
Club	Season	League			National cup (Note: Includes Bosnia and Herzegovina Cup, Coupe de France)		Continental		Total	
Club	Season	Division	Apps	Goals	Apps	Goals	Apps	Goals	Apps	Goals
Sarajevo	2017–18	Bosnian Premier League	9	0	–		–		9	0
Sarajevo	2018–19	Bosnian Premier League	14	1	2	0	1 (Note: Appearance in UEFA Europa League)	0	17	1
Sarajevo	2019–20	Bosnian Premier League	13	0	2	1	1 (Note: Appearance in UEFA Champions League)	0	16	1
Sarajevo	2021–22	Bosnian Premier League	25	1	5	1	2 (Note: Appearances in UEFA Europa Conference League)	0	32	2
Sarajevo	Total		61	2	9	2	4	0	74	4
Mladost Doboj Kakanj (loan)	2020–21	Bosnian Premier League	11	0	–		–		11	0
Angers	2022–23	Ligue 1	15	2	2	0	–		17	2
Angers	2023–24	Ligue 2	0	0	2	0	–		2	0
Angers	Total		15	2	4	0	–		19	2
Angers B	2022–23	Championnat National 2	2	0	–		–		2	0
Angers B	2023–24	Championnat National 2	2	0	–		–		2	0
Angers B	2024–25	Championnat National 3	3	0	–		–		3	0
Angers B	Total		7	0	–		–		7	0
Valenciennes (loan)	2023–24	Ligue 2	4	0	0	0	–		4	0
Vukovar 1991	2025–26	Croatian Football League	1	0	–		–		1	0
Čelik Zenica	2026–27	Bosnian Premier League	7	0	1	0	–		8	0
Career total			106	4	14	2	4	0	124	6

== Honours ==
Sarajevo

- Bosnian Premier League: 2018–19, 2019–20
- Bosnian Cup: 2018–19
