= Tarik Ramić =

Bosnian footballer (born 2003)

Personal information
- Date of birth: 7 April 2003 (age 23)
- Place of birth: Sanski Most, Bosnia and Herzegovina
- Height: 1.78 m (5 ft 10 in)
- Position: Attacking midfielder

Team information
- Current team: Zvijezda Gradačac
- Number: 28

Youth career
- 2016–2020: Sarajevo

Senior career*
Years	Team	Apps	(Gls)
2020–2023	Sarajevo	29	(2)
2023–2025	Zrinjski Mostar	44	(3)
2025–2026	Rudar Prijedor	28	(3)
2026–	Zvijezda Gradačac	1	(0)

International career
2021–2022	Bosnia and Herzegovina U19	10	(0)
2022–2024	Bosnia and Herzegovina U21	6	(1)
- * Club domestic league appearances and goals as of 20 September 2026

Tarik Ramić (born 7 April 2003) is a Bosnian professional footballer who plays as an attacking midfielder for First League of FBiH club Zvijezda Gradačac. Previosly he also played for the Bosnia and Herzegovina U21 national team.

== Career statistics ==
=== Club ===
As of match played 20 September 2025

Appearances and goals by club, season and competition
Club	Season	League			Bosnian Cup		Continental		Other		Total	
Club	Season	Division	Apps	Goals	Apps	Goals	Apps	Goals	Apps	Goals	Apps	Goals
Sarajevo	2020–21	Bosnian Premier League	0	0	1	0	—		—		1	0
Sarajevo	2021–22	Bosnian Premier League	16	2	3	0	2 (Note: Appearance(s) in UEFA Europa Conference League)	0	—		21	2
Sarajevo	2022–23	Bosnian Premier League	13	0	—		—		—		13	0
Sarajevo	Total		29	2	4	0	2	0	—		35	2
Zrinjski Mostar	2023–24	Bosnian Premier League	30	3	5	0	1 (Note: Appearance in UEFA Europa League)	0	—		36	3
Zrinjski Mostar	2024–25	Bosnian Premier League	14	0	0	0	1	0	1 (Note: Appearance in Bosnian Supercup)	0	16	0
Zrinjski Mostar	Total		44	3	5	0	2	0	1	0	52	3
Rudar Prijedor	2025–26	Bosnian Premier League	28	3	1	0	—		—		29	3
Zvijezda Gradačac	2026–27	First League of FBiH	1	0	0	0	—		—		1	0
Career total			102	8	10	0	4	0	1	0	117	8

== Honours ==
Sarajevo

- Bosnian Cup: 2020–21

Zrinjski Mostar

- Bosnian Premier League: 2024–25
- Bosnian Cup: 2023–24
- Bosnian Supercup: 2024
