= Muhamed Šahinović =

Bosnian footballer (born 2003)

Personal information
- Full name: Muhamed Šahinović
- Date of birth: 30 September 2003 (age 23)
- Place of birth: Sarajevo, Bosnia and Herzegovina
- Height: 1.91 m (6 ft 3 in)
- Position: Goalkeeper

Team information
- Current team: Radnički 1923 (on loan from Raków Częstochowa)
- Number: 1

Youth career
- –2020: Sarajevo

Senior career*
Years	Team	Apps	(Gls)
2020–2023	Sarajevo	33	(0)
2024–	Raków Częstochowa	1	(0)
2024–	Raków Częstochowa II	13	(0)
2024	→ Zemplín Michalovce (loan)	10	(0)
2025–2026	→ Koper (loan)	0	(0)
2026	→ Gorica (loan)	0	(0)
2026–	→ Radnički 1923 (loan)	0	(0)

International career
2019	Bosnia and Herzegovina U17	5	(0)
2021–2022	Bosnia and Herzegovina U19	11	(0)
2022–2024	Bosnia and Herzegovina U21	10	(0)
- * Club domestic league appearances and goals as of 18:19, 29 May 2026 (UTC)

Muhamed Šahinović (pronounced [muxǎmed ʃâːxinoʋitɕ]; born 30 September 2003) is a Bosnian professional footballer who plays as a goalkeeper for Serbian SuperLiga club Radnički 1923, on loan from Raków Częstochowa.

Šahinović started his professional career at Sarajevo, before joining Raków in 2024.

== Club career ==
=== Sarajevo ===
Šahinović came through the youth academy of his hometown club Sarajevo. In June 2020, he signed his first professional contract with the team. He made his professional debut in a Bosnian and Herzegovina Cup game against Radnički Lukavac on 13 October at the age of 17. Eleven months later, he made his league debut against Leotar.

In September 2022, he signed a new three-year deal with the club.

=== Raków Częstochowa ===
On 11 December 2023, Šahinović was transferred for an undisclosed fee to defending Ekstraklasa champions Raków Częstochowa, signing a contract until June 2028. He made his senior team debut on 13 April 2024 in a 1–1 home draw against Legia Warsaw. Four days later, it was announced he would miss the remainder of the season after picking up a leg injury in training.

==== Loan to Zemplin Michalovce ====
Despite Raków's first-choice goalkeeper Vladan Kovačević departing the club in the summer of 2024, Šahinović dropped in the order after the signings of Dušan Kuciak and Kristoffer Klaesson, as well as Kacper Trelowski returning from loan. On 1 August 2024, he was loaned to Slovak side Zemplín Michalovce for the remainder of the season. He returned to Raków during the 2025 winter break.

==== Loan to Koper ====
On 9 September 2025, Šahinović extended his deal with Raków until June 2029 and joined Slovenian side Koper on a season-long loan. He returned to Raków in January 2026 after failing to make an appearance for Koper.

==== Loan to Gorica ====
On 24 January 2026, Šahinović moved on loan to Croatian outfit Gorica for the rest of the season.

==== Loan to Radnički 1923 ====
On 30 June 2026, Šahinović was sent on loan again, this time joining Serbian SuperLiga club Radnički 1923 for the 2026–27 season.

== Career statistics ==
As of match played 8 April 2026

Appearances and goals by club, season and competition
Club	Season	League			National cup (Note: Includes Bosnia and Herzegovina Cup, Slovak Cup, Croatian Cup)		Continental		Total	
Club	Season	Division	Apps	Goals	Apps	Goals	Apps	Goals	Apps	Goals
Sarajevo	2020–21	Bosnian Premier League	0	0	1	0	—		1	0
Sarajevo	2021–22	Bosnian Premier League	1	0	0	0	0	0	1	0
Sarajevo	2022–23	Bosnian Premier League	18	0	0	0	—		18	0
Sarajevo	2023–24	Bosnian Premier League	14	0	0	0	1 (Note: Appearance in UEFA Europa Conference League)	0	15	0
Sarajevo	Total		33	0	1	0	1	0	35	0
Raków Częstochowa	2023–24	Ekstraklasa	1	0	0	0	—		1	0
Raków Częstochowa	2024–25	Ekstraklasa	0	0	0	0	—		1	0
Raków Częstochowa	Total		1	0	0	0	—		1	0
Raków Częstochowa II	2023–24	III liga, group III	3	0	—		—		3	0
Raków Częstochowa II	2024–25	IV liga Silesia	10	0	—		—		10	0
Raków Częstochowa II	Total		13	0	—		—		13	0
Zemplín Michalovce (loan)	2024–25	Slovak First Football League	10	0	2	0	—		12	0
Koper (loan)	2025–26	Slovenian PrvaLiga	0	0	—		—		0	0
Gorica (loan)	2025–26	Croatian Football League	0	0	2	0	—		2	0
Radnički 1923 (loan)	2026–27	Serbian SuperLiga	0	0	0	0	—		0	0
Career total			57	0	5	0	1	0	63	0

== Honours ==
Sarajevo

- Bosnia and Herzegovina Football Cup: 2020–21
