= Selmir Pidro =

Bosnian footballer (born 1998)

Personal information
- Date of birth: 3 March 1998 (age 28)
- Place of birth: Bugojno, Bosnia and Herzegovina
- Height: 1.79 m (5 ft 10 in)
- Position: Left-back

Team information
- Current team: Sarajevo
- Number: 70

Youth career
- –2014: Iskra Bugojno
- 2014–2018: Sarajevo

Senior career*
Years	Team	Apps	(Gls)
2018–2022	Sarajevo	74	(1)
2018	→ Bosna Visoko (loan)	13	(2)
2022–2024	St. Louis City 2	20	(1)
2023–2026	St. Louis City	2	(0)
2023–2024	→ Zlín (loan)	19	(0)
2025	→ Velež Mostar (loan)	28	(4)
2026	Velež Mostar	14	(1)
2026–	Sarajevo	13	(0)

International career
2014	Bosnia and Herzegovina U17	2	(0)
2018–2020	Bosnia and Herzegovina U21	6	(0)
2021	Bosnia and Herzegovina	2	(0)
- * Club domestic league appearances and goals as of 22 November 2026

Selmir Pidro (Bosnian pronunciation: [sělmiːr pîːdro]; born 3 March 1998) is a Bosnian professional footballer who plays as a left-back for Bosnian Premier League club Sarajevo.

Pidro started his professional career at Sarajevo, who loaned him to Bosna Visoko in 2018. In 2022, he was unveiled as St. Louis City’s first signing in Major League Soccer.

A former youth international for Bosnia and Herzegovina, Pidro made his senior international debut in 2021.

== Club career ==
=== Sarajevo ===
Pidro started playing at his hometown club Iskra Bugojno, before joining Sarajevo's youth academy in 2014. On 9 June 2017, he signed his first professional contract with the team.

In January 2018, he was sent on a six-month loan to Bosna Visoko. He made his professional debut against Orašje on 10 March at the age of 20. Three weeks later, he scored his first professional goal.

In August, following his return from loan, Pidro signed a new five-year contract with Sarajevo. He made his competitive debut for the team away at Sloboda Tuzla on 5 August. On 1 December, he scored his first goal for Sarajevo in a triumph over Čelik Zenica.

In April 2019, he suffered a severe knee injury, which was diagnosed as anterior cruciate ligament tear and was ruled out for at least six months.

Pidro won his first trophy with the club on 15 May, by beating Široki Brijeg in Bosnian Cup final.

On 9 July 2020, he extended his contract until June 2024.

=== St. Louis City SC ===
On 1 February 2022, it was announced that Pidro signed a pre-contract with St. Louis City SC team of Major League Soccer, who would begin play in 2023, through 2025, joining the second team first in July 2022. He made his MLS debut on 15 April 2023, in a substitute appearance, against FC Cincinnati.

On 11 September 2023, Pidro joined Czech club Zlín on a loan deal to the end of the season without option.

== International career ==
Pidro represented Bosnia and Herzegovina on various youth levels.

In March 2021, he received his first senior call-up, for friendly game against Costa Rica, and debuted in that game on 27 March.

== Career statistics ==
=== Club ===
As of match played 22 November 2026

Appearances and goals by club, season and competition
Club	Season	League			National cup (Note: Includes Bosnian Cup, U.S. Open Cup, Czech Cup)		Continental		Total	
Club	Season	Division	Apps	Goals	Apps	Goals	Apps	Goals	Apps	Goals
Bosna Visoko (loan)	2017–18	First League of FBiH	13	2	—		—		13	2
Sarajevo	2018–19	Bosnian Premier League	17	1	2	0	3 (Note: Appearances in UEFA Europa League)	0	22	1
Sarajevo	2019–20	Bosnian Premier League	0	0	0	0	0	0	0	0
Sarajevo	2020–21	Bosnian Premier League	29	0	4	0	3 (Note: One appearance in UEFA Champions League; two appearances in UEFA Europa League)	0	36	0
Sarajevo	2021–22	Bosnian Premier League	28	0	5	0	2 (Note: Appearances in UEFA Europa Conference League)	0	35	0
Sarajevo	Total		74	1	11	0	8	0	93	1
St. Louis City 2	2022	MLS Next Pro	7	1	—		—		7	1
St. Louis City 2	2023	MLS Next Pro	8	0	—		—		8	0
St. Louis City 2	2024	MLS Next Pro	5	0	—		—		5	0
St. Louis City 2	Total		20	1	—		—		20	1
St. Louis City	2023	Major League Soccer	2	0	2	0	—		4	0
Zlín (loan)	2023–24	Czech National League	19	0	3	0	—		22	0
Velež Mostar (loan)	2024–25	Bosnian Premier League	10	1	2	0	—		12	1
Velež Mostar (loan)	2025–26	Bosnian Premier League	18	3	0	0	—		18	3
Velež Mostar	2025–26	Bosnian Premier League	14	1	7	0	—		21	1
Velež Mostar	Total		42	5	9	0	—		51	5
Sarajevo	2026–27	Bosnian Premier League	13	0	1	0	—		14	0
Career total			183	9	26	0	8	0	217	9

=== International ===
As of match played 18 March 2021

National team	Year	Apps	Goals
Bosnia and Herzegovina
Bosnia and Herzegovina	2021	2	0
Total		2	0

== Honours ==
Sarajevo

- Bosnian Premier League: 2018–19, 2019–20
- Bosnian Cup: 2018–19, 2020–21
