= Muğlaspor =

Turkish sports club

- Full name: Muğla Spor Kulübü
- Founded: 1967
- Ground: Muğla Atatürk Stadium, Muğla
- Capacity: 7,755
- Coordinates: 37°12′43″N 28°21′50″E
- Chairman: Menaf Kıyanç
- Manager: Yalçın Koşukavak
- League: TFF 1. Lig
- 2025–26: TFF 2. Lig, White, 2nd of 19 (promoted via play-offs)
Home colours	Away colours

Muğlaspor is a sports club in located in Muğla, Turkey. The football club plays in the 1. Lig.

== League participations ==
- TFF First League: 1981–1995, 1996–1997, 2026–
- TFF Second League: 2002–2007, 2025–2026
- TFF Third League: 1967–1973, 1995–1996, 1997–2002, 2007–2008, 2009–2010, 2016–2021, 2024–2025
- Turkish Regional Amateur League: 2010–2016, 2021–2024
- Amateur Leagues: 1973–1981, 2008–2009

== Honours ==
TFF 2. Lig

Play-off Winners (1): 2025–26

TFF 3. Lig

Winners (3): 1995–96, 2001–02, 2024–25

Turkish Regional Amateur League

Winners (1): 2023–24
Play-off Winners (1): 2015–16

== Current squad ==
As of 14 November 2026

Note: Flags indicate national team as defined under FIFA eligibility rules; some limited exceptions apply. Players may hold more than one non-FIFA nationality.

No.	Pos.	Nation	Player
3	DF	TUR	Ali Barak
5	DF	TUR	Oğuzhan Matur
7	FW	MNE	Driton Camaj
9	FW	TUR	Poyraz Efe Yıldırım (on loan from Trabzonspor)
10	MF	MKD	Daniel Avramovski
11	FW	MLI	Mamady Diarra
13	FW	USA	Korede Osundina (on loan from Casa Pia)
15	DF	TUR	Orhan Nahırcı
17	GK	TUR	Ekrem Kılıçarslan
20	MF	TUR	Buluthan Bulut (on loan from Alanyaspor)
21	MF	ALB	Jurgen Çelhaka
22	DF	TUR	Bilal Ceylan
23	MF	TUR	Ali Kaan Güneren (on loan from Iğdır)
25	MF	TUR	Selim Dilli

No.	Pos.	Nation	Player
26	FW	TUN	Salem Bouajila (on loan from Göztepe)
27	FW	MLI	Ibrahim Sissoko
28	FW	TUR	Ahmet Engin
30	MF	TUR	Baran Ekiz
31	GK	TUR	Arel Ekinci
33	DF	TUR	Batuhan Yılmaz
35	GK	TUR	Batıhan Gebecelioğlu
44	DF	VEN	Luis Mago
48	FW	TUR	Ozan Sol
53	DF	TUR	Alihan Kazmaz
88	DF	TUR	Yiğit Fidan (on loan from Fenerbahçe)
91	MF	TUR	İdris Furat (on loan from Bursaspor)
99	FW	TUR	Yasin Uzunoğlu

=== Other players under contract ===
Note: Flags indicate national team as defined under FIFA eligibility rules; some limited exceptions apply. Players may hold more than one non-FIFA nationality.

No.	Pos.	Nation	Player
—	MF	AUT	Oğuzhan Özleşen

=== Out on loan ===
Note: Flags indicate national team as defined under FIFA eligibility rules; some limited exceptions apply. Players may hold more than one non-FIFA nationality.

No.	Pos.	Nation	Player
—	GK	TUR	Akil Şakirt (at Düzcespor until 30 June 2027)
—	MF	TUR	Cebrail İrtürk (at Şanlıurfaspor until 30 June 2027)

No.	Pos.	Nation	Player
—	FW	TUR	Mehmet Anıl Yörük (at Bigaspor until 30 June 2027)

== Notable player(s) ==
- İhsan Özgen
