= Buluthan Bulut =

Turkish footballer

Personal information
- Date of birth: 21 July 2002 (age 24)
- Place of birth: Bursa, Turkey
- Height: 1.71 m (5 ft 7 in)
- Position: Midfielder

Team information
- Current team: Muğlaspor (on loan from Alanyaspor)
- Number: 20

Youth career
- 2013: Bağlarbaşıspor
- 2013–2016: Altınordu
- 2016–2018: Göztepe
- 2018–2020: Alanyaspor

Senior career*
| Years | Team | Apps | (Gls) |
| 2020– | Alanyaspor | 9 | (0) |
| 2020–2021 | → Alanya Kestelspor (loan) | 28 | (1) |
| 2022–2023 | → Alanya Kestelspor (loan) | 40 | (1) |
| 2024 | → Alanya Kestelspor (loan) | 5 | (1) |
| 2026– | → Muğlaspor (loan) | 5 | (0) |

International career^{‡}
| 2020 | Turkey U18 | 4 | (0) |
- * Club domestic league appearances and goals as of 11 October 2026 ‡ National team caps and goals as of 22:56, 21 August 2021 (UTC)

Buluthan Bulut (born 21 July 2002) is a Turkish professional footballer who plays as a midfielder for TFF 1. Lig club Muğlaspor on loan from Alanyaspor.

== Professional career ==
A youth product of Bağlarbaşıspor, Altınordu, Göztepe, and Alanyaspor, Bulut signed his first professional contract with Alanyaspor. He joined Alanya Kestelspor on loan for the 2020–21 season in the TFF Third League. He made his professional debut for Alanyaspor in a 4–1 Süper Lig loss to Altay on 21 August 2021.
