= Daniel Avramovski =

Macedonian footballer

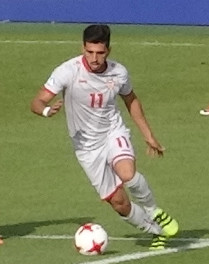
- Avramovski playing for Macedonia U21 at UEFA Under-21 Euro 2017

Personal information
- Date of birth: 20 February 1995 (age 31)
- Place of birth: Skopje, Macedonia
- Height: 1.84 m (6 ft 0 in)
- Position: Attacking midfielder

Team information
- Current team: Muğlaspor
- Number: 10

Senior career*
Years	Team	Apps	(Gls)
2010–2014	Rabotnichki	8	(0)
2013–2014	→ Makedonija GP (loan)	29	(1)
2014–2016	Crvena Zvezda	12	(1)
2015–2016	→ OFK Beograd (loan)	22	(0)
2017–2019	Olimpija Ljubljana	7	(0)
2017–2018	→ Vojvodina (loan)	17	(1)
2019–2020	Vardar	38	(12)
2020–2022	Kayserispor	25	(2)
2022–2023	Sarajevo	40	(3)
2024–2025	Boluspor	36	(17)
2025	Iğdır	22	(5)
2025–2026	Sivasspor	27	(4)
2026–	Muğlaspor	13	(2)

International career^{‡}
2011	Macedonia U17	3	(2)
2014–2017	Macedonia U21	12	(0)
2014–	North Macedonia	8	(0)
- * Club domestic league appearances and goals as of 7 November 2026 ‡ National team caps and goals as of 20 November 2019

Daniel Avramovski (Macedonian: Даниел Аврамовски; born 20 February 1995) is a Macedonian professional footballer who plays as an attacking midfielder for Turkish TFF 1. Lig club Muğlaspor.

== Club career ==
=== Rabotnički ===
Born in Skopje, Avramovski played with FK Rabotnički and FK Makedonija Gjorče Petrov in the First Macedonian Football League. While with Rabotnički, Avramovski developed a reputation which brought the attention of several European clubs, and in February 2012 was invited to a ten-day trial with Liverpool.

=== Red Star Belgrade ===
In July 2014 he signed a three-year contract with Serbian side Red Star Belgrade. On 30 August 2014, Avramovski scored on his debut with Red Star, scoring the only goal in the 1–0 win against FK Spartak Subotica just ten minutes after coming on as a substitute.

Avramovski was loaned to OFK Beograd, where he made 22 league and 2 cup appearances in the 2015–16 season.

In summer 2016, Avramovski returned in Red Star Belgrade, and he was licensed for Second qualifying round of the 2016–17 UEFA Europa League season. After some injury problems, he failed to play, and spent the rest of a year without any official matches for the club. As he was not licensed for the Serbian SuperLiga already, Avramovski terminated his contract and left the club in December of the same year.

=== Olimpija Ljubljana ===
On 20 December 2016, Avramovski moved to Slovenia, and signed a three-and-a-half-year deal with Olimpija Ljubljana.

==== Loan to Vojvodina ====
On the last day of the Serbian summer transfer window, Avramovski signed a one-year loan deal, with the option of buyout, with Vojvodina.

== International career ==
On 18 June 2014 he made his debut for the Macedonian national team at the age of 19 in a 2–0 friendly loss against the Chinese national team.

He was part of the Macedonia squad UEFA Euro 2020. In this competition, he played a group stage match against Ukraine, which ended in a defeat. With a scant record of three losses in three games, eight goals conceded in and only two goals scored, Macedonia was eliminated from the first round.

== Career statistics ==
=== Club ===
As of match played 25 January 2025

Appearances and goals by club, season and competition
Club	Season	League			National cup (Note: Includes Bosnia and Herzegovina Cup, Slovenian Cup, Serbian Cup, Turkish Cup)		Continental		Total	
Club	Season	Division	Apps	Goals	Apps	Goals	Apps	Goals	Apps	Goals
Rabotnički	2010–11	Macedonian First League	1	0	—		—		1	0
Rabotnički	2011–12	Macedonian First League	7	0	1	0	1 (Note: Appearance(s) in UEFA Europa League)	0	9	0
Rabotnički	2012–13	Macedonian First League	0	0	0	0	—		0	0
Rabotnički	2013–14	Macedonian First League	0	0	0	0	—		0	0
Rabotnički	2014–15	Macedonian First League	0	0	0	0	2 (Note: Appearance(s) in UEFA Champions League)	0	2	0
Rabotnički	Total		8	0	1	0	3	0	12	0
Makedonija G.P. (loan)	2013–14	Macedonian First League	29	1	0	0	—		29	1
Crvena Zvezda	2014–15	Serbian SuperLiga	12	1	1	0	—		13	1
Crvena Zvezda	2015–16	Serbian SuperLiga	0	0	0	0	0	0	0	0
Crvena Zvezda	2016–17	Serbian SuperLiga	0	0	0	0	0	0	0	0
Crvena Zvezda	Total		12	1	1	0	0	0	13	1
OFK Beograd (loan)	2015–16	Serbian SuperLiga	22	0	2	0	—		24	0
Olimpija Ljubljana	2016–17	Slovenian PrvaLiga	7	0	2	0	0	0	9	0
Olimpija Ljubljana	2017–18	Slovenian PrvaLiga	0	0	0	0	0	0	0	0
Olimpija Ljubljana	2018–19	Slovenian PrvaLiga	0	0	1	0	6 (Note: Two appearances in UEFA Champions League; four appearances, one goal in UEFA Europa League)	1	7	1
Olimpija Ljubljana	Total		7	0	3	0	6	1	16	1
Vojvodina (loan)	2017–18	Serbian SuperLiga	17	1	2	0	0	0	19	1
Vardar	2018–19	Macedonian First League	16	1	0	0	0	0	16	1
Vardar	2019–20	Macedonian First League	22	11	—		—		22	11
Vardar	Total		38	12	0	0	0	0	38	12
Kayserispor	2020–21	Süper Lig	24	2	0	0	—		24	2
Kayserispor	2021–22	Süper Lig	1	0	0	0	—		1	0
Kayserispor	Total		25	2	0	0	—		25	2
Sarajevo	2021–22	Bosnian Premier League	6	1	2	1	—		8	2
Sarajevo	2022–23	Bosnian Premier League	19	2	1	0	—		20	2
Sarajevo	2023–24	Bosnian Premier League	15	0	1	0	1 (Note: Appearance(s) in UEFA Europa Conference League)	0	17	0
Sarajevo	Total		40	3	4	1	1	0	45	4
Boluspor	2023–24	TFF First League	18	8	0	0	—		18	8
Boluspor	2024–25	TFF First League	18	9	1	0	—		19	9
Boluspor	Total		36	17	1	0	—		37	17
Iğdır	2024–25	TFF First League	2	0	—		—		2	0
Career total			236	37	14	1	10	1	260	39

=== International ===
As of 19 November 2019

Appearances and goals by national team and year
National team	Year	Apps	Goals
North Macedonia
North Macedonia	2014	2	0
North Macedonia	2019	2	0
North Macedonia	2021	4	0
Total		8	0

== Honours ==
Vardar

- Macedonian First Football League: 2019–20

Individual

- Macedonian First Football League Top Goalscorer: 2019–20 (10 goals)
