= Ekrem Kılıçarslan =

Turkish footballer (born 1997)

Personal information
- Date of birth: 22 August 1997 (age 29)
- Place of birth: Çanakkale, Turkey
- Height: 1.88 m (6 ft 2 in)
- Position: Goalkeeper

Team information
- Current team: Muğlaspor
- Number: 17

Youth career
- 2008–2011: Hastane Bayırıspor
- 2011–2012: Dardanelspor
- 2012–2016: Eskişehirspor

Senior career*
| Years | Team | Apps | (Gls) |
| 2016–2021 | Eskişehirspor | 55 | (0) |
| 2021 | Hatayspor | 0 | (0) |
| 2021–2023 | Gaziantep | 1 | (0) |
| 2022–2023 | → Göztepe (loan) | 18 | (0) |
| 2024 | Ankara Keçiörengücü | 3 | (0) |
| 2024–2026 | Göztepe | 0 | (0) |
| 2024–2025 | → Esenler Erokspor (loan) | 30 | (0) |
| 2026– | Muğlaspor | 10 | (0) |
- * Club domestic league appearances and goals as of 19 October 2026

Ekrem Kılıçarslan (born 22 August 1997) is a Turkish professional footballer who plays as a goalkeeper for TFF 1. Lig club Muğlaspor.

== Career ==
Kılıçarslan is a youth product of Hastane Bayırıspor, Dardanelspor and Eskişehirspor. He began his senior career with Eskişehirspor as their backup goalkeeper, signing his first professional contract on 15 October 2016. After 5 years with the club where he eventually became starter, Kılıçarslan signed with the Süper Lig club Hatayspor on 1 February 2021. He transferred to Gaziantep on 5 August 2021. He made his professional debut with Gaziantep in a 1–1 Süper Lig tie with Çaykur Rizespor on 20 May 2022.

== Career statistics ==
As of match played 4 May 2025

Appearances and goals by club, season and competition
| Club | Season | League | | | National cup (Note: Includes Polish Cup, Coupe de France) | | Europe | | Total | |
| Club | Season | Division | Apps | Goals | Apps | Goals | Apps | Goals | Apps | Goals |
|---|---|---|---|---|---|---|---|---|---|---|
| Eskişehirspor | 2016–17 | 1. Lig | 0 | 0 | 0 | 0 | 0 | 0 | 0 | 0 |
| Eskişehirspor | 2017–18 | 1. Lig | 0 | 0 | 0 | 0 | — | | 0 | 0 |
| Eskişehirspor | 2018–19 | 1. Lig | 20 | 0 | 0 | 0 | — | | 20 | 0 |
| Eskişehirspor | 2019–20 | 1. Lig | 21 | 0 | 1 | 0 | — | | 21 | 0 |
| Eskişehirspor | 2020–21 | 1. Lig | 14 | 0 | 2 | 0 | — | | 16 | 0 |
| Eskişehirspor | Total | | 55 | 0 | 3 | 0 | 0 | 0 | 58 | 0 |
| Hatayspor | 2020–21 | Süper Lig | 0 | 0 | — | | — | | 0 | 0 |
| Gaziantep | 2021–22 | Süper Lig | 1 | 0 | 0 | 0 | — | | 1 | 0 |
| Göztepe (loan) | 2022–23 | 1. Lig | 18 | 0 | 0 | 0 | 0 | 0 | 18 | 0 |
| Ankara Keçiörengücü | 2023–24 | 1. Lig | 3 | 0 | 1 | 0 | — | | 4 | 0 |
| Göztepe | 2024–25 | Süper Lig | 0 | 0 | — | | — | | 0 | 0 |
| Göztepe | 2025–26 | Süper Lig | 0 | 0 | 0 | 0 | — | | 0 | 0 |
| Göztepe | Total | | 0 | 0 | 0 | 0 | — | | 0 | 0 |
| Esenler Erokspor (loan) | 2024–25 | TFF 1. Lig | 30 | 0 | 0 | 0 | — | | 30 | 0 |
| Career total | | | 107 | 0 | 4 | 0 | 0 | 0 | 111 | 0 |
