= Ali Barak =

Turkish footballer (born 2003)

Personal information
- Date of birth: 26 February 2003 (age 23)
- Place of birth: Düsseldorf, Germany
- Height: 1.78 m (5 ft 10 in)
- Position: Left-back

Team information
- Current team: Muğlaspor
- Number: 3

Youth career
- 2009–2012: SG Unterrath
- 2012–2022: Bayer Leverkusen

Senior career*
Years	Team	Apps	(Gls)
2022–2023	Roda JC	3	(0)
2023–2025	1. FC Bocholt	24	(0)
2025	Altınordu	11	(0)
2025–2026	Zonguldakspor FK	23	(2)
2026–	Muğlaspor	7	(0)

International career
2022–2023	Turkey U21	4	(0)
- * Club domestic league appearances and goals as of 19:26, 24 September 2026 (UTC)

Ali Barak (born 26 February 2003) is a professional footballer who plays as a left-back for TFF 1. Lig club Muğlaspor. Born in Germany, he is a former youth international for Turkey.

== Club career ==
=== Roda JC ===
Barak was a youth player at Bayer Leverkusen before moving to Roda JC on trial in the summer of 2022. He signed a one-year contract after impressing enough in three pre-season matches. Barak made his debut in the Eerste Divisie for Roda JC on 5 August 2022, starting in a 2–0 win against Dordrecht.

=== 1. FC Bocholt ===
On 6 June 2023, Barak signed a two-year contract with Regionalliga West club 1. FC Bocholt. Upon signing, new Bocholt manager Dietmar Hirsch expressed his pleasure with the signing: "Ali impresses with a great mentality and strong duel behavior, which makes him a perfect fit for our new philosophy."

He made his competitive debut for the club on 23 August in the first round of the Lower Rhine Cup, starting in a 3–0 victory against Rheinland Hamborn. His league debut followed five days later, as he replaced Brian Campman in the 64th minute of a 5–0 defeat against SC Paderborn 07 II.

== International career ==
Born in Germany, Barak is of Turkish descent. He was called up to the represent the Turkey U21s for a set of matches in September 2022.

== Career statistics ==
As of match played 9 December 2023

Appearances and goals by club, season and competition
Club	Season	League			Cup		Europe		Other		Total	
Club	Season	Division	Apps	Goals	Apps	Goals	Apps	Goals	Apps	Goals	Apps	Goals
Roda JC	2022–23	Eerste Divisie	3	0	1	0	—		0	0	4	0
1. FC Bocholt	2023–24	Regionalliga West	5	0	0	0	—		3 (Note: Appearances in Lower Rhine Cup)	0	8	0
Career total			8	0	1	0	0	0	3	0	12	0
