= Baran Ali Gezek =

Turkish footballer (born 2005)

Personal information
- Full name: Baran Ali Gezek
- Date of birth: 26 August 2005 (age 21)
- Place of birth: Mersin, Türkiye
- Height: 1.82 m (6 ft 0 in)
- Position: Midfielder

Team information
- Current team: Alanyaspor
- Number: 55

Youth career
- 2014–2017: Mezitlispor
- 2017–2018: Mersin Ter Spor
- 2018–2022: Kayserispor

Senior career*
Years	Team	Apps	(Gls)
2022–2026	Kayserispor	35	(0)
2025–2026	→ Eyüpspor (loan)	17	(0)
2026–	Alanyaspor	7	(0)

International career^{‡}
2022	Turkey U17	8	(0)
2022–2023	Turkey U18	9	(1)
2023–2024	Turkey U19	18	(0)
2024–2025	Turkey U20	6	(0)
2024–	Turkey U21	6	(1)
- * Club domestic league appearances and goals as of 10 October 2026 ‡ National team caps and goals as of 6 October 2026

Baran Ali Gezek (born 26 August 2005) is a Turkish professional footballer who plays as a midfielder for Süper Lig club Alanyaspor.

== Career ==
Gezek is a youth product of Mezitlispor, Mersin Ter Spor and Kayserispor. On 22 July 2022, he signed his first professional contract with Kayserispor for 3 years. He made his senior and professional debut with Kayserispor as a substitute in a 2–0 Süper Lig loss to İstanbul Başakşehir on 21 August 2022.

== International career ==
Gezek is a youth international for Turkey, having played for the Turkey U17s at the 2022 UEFA European Under-17 Championship. In March 2026 while he was in the Turkey U21s camp, Gezek received an emergency call-up to the Turkey senior squad for the training squad against Romania.
