= Kenan Topolović =

Croatian-born Bosnian and Herzegovina footballer

Personal information
- Date of birth: 3 March 1998 (age 28)
- Place of birth: Slavonski Brod, Croatia
- Height: 1.93 m (6 ft 4 in)
- Position: Goalkeeper

Team information
- Current team: Rudar Prijedor
- Number: 1

Youth career
- –2015: Sarajevo
- 2015–2016: Željezničar
- 2016–2017: Cibalia

Senior career*
Years	Team	Apps	(Gls)
2016–2017	Cibalia	0	(0)
2017–2019	Inter Zaprešić	1	(0)
2019	Borac Banja Luka	11	(0)
2019–2020	Zrinjski Mostar	1	(0)
2020–	Rudar Prijedor	10	(0)

International career^{‡}
2019–	Bosnia and Herzegovina U21	1	(0)
- * Club domestic league appearances and goals as of 14 November 2020 ‡ National team caps and goals as of 5 June 2019

Kenan Topolović (born 3 March 1998) is a Croatian-born Bosnian professional footballer who plays as a goalkeeper for Bosnian Premier League club Rudar Prijedor the Bosnia and Herzegovina U21 national team.

== Club career ==
=== Early career ===
Topolović started off his career in the youth team of Sarajevo, before joining the youth team of city rivals Željezničar in 2015.

One year after playing for Željezničar, he went to Croatia, where he signed for both the youth team and the first team of Croatian 1. HNL club Cibalia on 23 October 2016.

=== Inter Zaprešić ===
In the summer of 2017, Topolović signed with 1. HNL club Inter Zaprešić.

He made his debut for Inter on 19 May 2018, in a 3–1 away loss against Dinamo Zagreb.

=== Borac Banja Luka ===
In January 2019, Topolović signed with, back then still, First League of RS club Borac Banja Luka. He made his debut for Borac on 9 March 2019, in a 0–2 away win against Slavija Sarajevo.

With the club, Topolović won the 2018–19 First League of RS title in May 2019, and thus got promoted to the Bosnian Premier League.

=== Zrinjski Mostar ===
On 22 June 2019, Topolović signed a three-year contract with Zrinjski Mostar after leaving Borac a few days earlier. He made his official debut for Zrinjski on 23 November 2019, in a 0–0 away league draw against his former club Borac, in which he came in as a 69th-minute substitute for injured Ivan Brkić. Topolović decided to leave Zrinjski in January 2020.

=== Rudar Prijedor ===
Not long after leaving Zrinjski, on 23 January 2020, Topolović signed a contract with First League of RS club Rudar Prijedor. He made his official debut for the club in a league match against Krupa on 7 March 2020.

On 5 June 2020, Topolović extended his contract with Rudar until June 2022.

== International career ==
Topalović got called up to the Bosnia and Herzegovina national U21 team on 11 March 2019.

He made his debut for the national team on 5 June 2019, in a friendly game against Malta, which ended up in a 0–0 draw.

== Career statistics ==
=== Club ===
As of match played 14 November 2020.

Appearances and goals by club, season and competition
Club	Season	League			Cup		Continental		Total	
Club	Season	Division	Apps	Goals	Apps	Goals	Apps	Goals	Apps	Goals
Cibalia	2016–17	1. HNL	0	0	0	0	—		0	0
Inter Zaprešić	2017–18	1. HNL	1	0	0	0	—		1	0
Inter Zaprešić	2018–19	1. HNL	0	0	0	0	—		0	0
Inter Zaprešić	Total		1	0	0	0	—		1	0
Borac Banja Luka	2018–19	First League of RS	11	0	1	0	—		12	0
Zrinjski Mostar	2019–20	Bosnian Premier League	1	0	0	0	0	0	1	0
Rudar Prijedor	2019–20	First League of RS	1	0	—		—		1	0
Rudar Prijedor	2020–21	First League of RS	10	0	2	0	—		12	0
Rudar Prijedor	Total		11	0	2	0	—		13	0
Career total			24	0	3	0	0	0	27	0

== Honours ==
Borac Banja Luka

- First League of RS: 2018–19
