= Nikola Dujaković =

Bosnian footballer

Personal information
- Date of birth: 27 June 1996 (age 30)
- Place of birth: Banja Luka, Bosnia and Herzegovina
- Height: 1.83 m (6 ft 0 in)
- Position: Midfielder

Team information
- Current team: Sloga Meridian
- Number: 27

Youth career
- 2006–2014: Borac Banja Luka

Senior career*
Years	Team	Apps	(Gls)
2014–2015	Borac Banja Luka	2	(0)
2015–2021	Krupa	125	(15)
2021	Borac Banja Luka	15	(0)
2022	Leotar	10	(3)
2022–2023	GOŠK Gabela	13	(2)
2023	Krupa	16	(4)
2023–	Sloga Meridian	23	(1)

International career
2017–2018	Bosnia and Herzegovina U21	1	(0)
- * Club domestic league appearances and goals as of 1 June 2024

Nikola Dujaković (Serbian Cyrillic: Никола Дујаковић; born 27 June 1996) is a Bosnian professional footballer who plays as a midfielder for Bosnian Premier League club Sloga Meridian.

== Club career ==
Starting his career at hometown club Borac Banja Luka, Dujaković made his debut for the club in 2015 in the Bosnian Premier League. He then joined, at the time, First League of RS club Krupa. In the 2015–16, with Krupa, Dujaković won the club's first ever and historic First League of RS title and got promoted to the Bosnian Premier League. With the club, he also became a Bosnian Cup runner-up in the 2017–18 season, losing against Željezničar in the final.

Dujaković got relegated with Krupa back to the First League of RS in the 2018–19 season, but got promoted back to the Bosnian Premier League in the next season, though after the season was ended abruptly due to the COVID-19 pandemic in Bosnia and Herzegovina, after which, by default, Krupa were crowned league champions and got promoted.

In July 2021, he left Krupa and returned to Borac.

== International career ==
From 2017 until 2018, Dujaković represented the Bosnia and Herzegovina U21 national team, making one appearance.

== Honours ==
Krupa

- First League of RS: 2015–16, 2019–20
- Bosnian Cup runner-up: 2017–18
