= Rijad Kobiljar =

Bosnian footballer

Personal information
- Date of birth: 8 April 1996 (age 30)
- Place of birth: Sarajevo, Bosnia and Herzegovina
- Height: 1.73 m (5 ft 8 in)
- Position: Midfielder

Team information
- Current team: Vllaznia Shkodër
- Number: 96

Youth career
- JUFC

College career
Years	Team	Apps	(Gls)
2014	Jacksonville Dolphins	10	(1)

Senior career*
Years	Team	Apps	(Gls)
2015–2016	Sarajevo	0	(0)
2016	→ Travnik (loan)	9	(0)
2016	Olimpik	19	(1)
2017–2018	Zrinjski Mostar	4	(0)
2017	→ GOŠK Gabela (loan)	16	(1)
2018	Olimpija Ljubljana	0	(0)
2019	Rudar Velenje	34	(4)
2020–2021	Uerdingen 05	17	(2)
2021–2022	Sarajevo	35	(1)
2023	Jacksonville Armada U-23	0	(0)
2023–2024	Tuzla City	31	(2)
2024–2025	Posušje	28	(2)
2025–2026	Sakaryaspor	15	(0)
2026	Tirana	10	(0)
2026–	Vllaznia Shkodër	0	(0)

International career
2016	Bosnia and Herzegovina U21	1	(0)
- * Club domestic league appearances and goals as of 22 November 2025

Rijad Kobiljar (born 8 April 1996) is a Bosnian professional footballer who last played as a midfielder for Albanian Kategoria Superiore club Vllaznia Shkodër.

== Honours ==
Zrinjski Mostar

- Bosnian Premier League: 2016–17
