= Kerim Palić =

Bosnian footballer

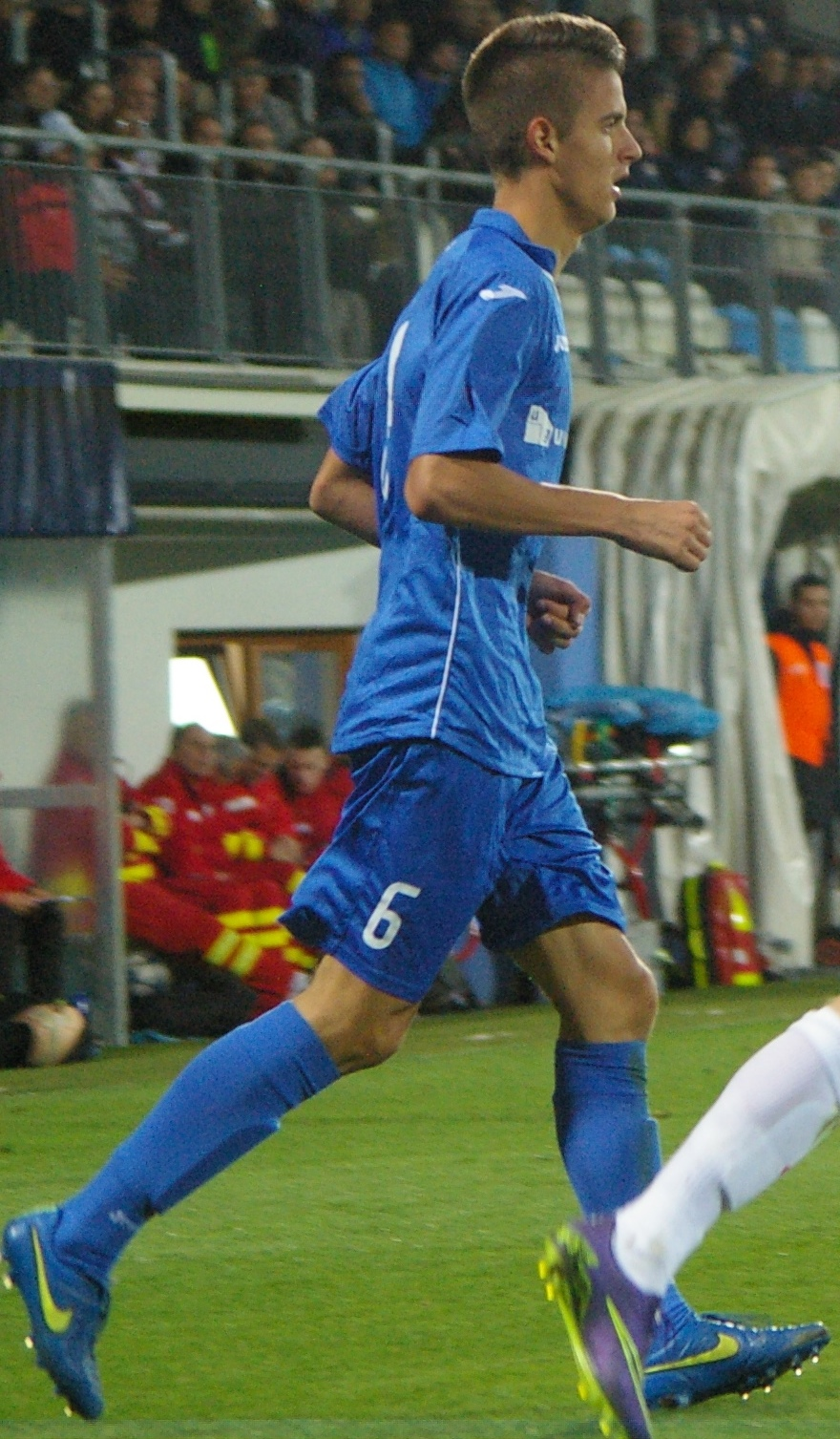
- Palić playing for Željezničar in 2015

Personal information
- Date of birth: 24 January 1997 (age 29)
- Place of birth: Sarajevo, Bosnia and Herzegovina
- Height: 1.88 m (6 ft 2 in)
- Position: Defensive midfielder

Team information
- Current team: Ayutthaya United
- Number: 4

Youth career
- 2012–2016: Željezničar

Senior career*
Years	Team	Apps	(Gls)
2016–2017	Inter Bratislava	3	(0)
2017–2021	Krupa	62	(3)
2021–2022	Sarajevo	21	(0)
2022–2024	Metallurg Bekabad	59	(1)
2025–2026	Madura United	46	(1)
2026–	Ayutthaya United	0	(0)

International career
2015	Bosnia and Herzegovina U19	4	(1)
- * Club domestic league appearances and goals as of 23 May 2026

Kerim Palić (born 24 January 1997) is a Bosnian professional footballer who plays as a defensive midfielder for Thai League 1 club Ayutthaya United.
