= Alanyaspor =

Turkish professional football club

- Full name: Alanyaspor Kulübü
- Nickname: Şimşekler (Thunders)
- Founded: 1948; 78 years ago
- Stadium: Alanya Oba Stadium
- Capacity: 9,789
- Coordinates: 36°33′45″N 32°04′45″E
- President: Hasan Çavuşoğlu
- Head coach: Uğur Uçar
- League: Süper Lig
- 2025–26: Süper Lig, 11th of 18
- Website: alanyaspor.org.tr
Home colours	Away colours	Third colours

Alanyaspor Kulübü, known as Corendon Alanyaspor for sponsorship reasons, is a Turkish professional football club based in the city of Alanya in Antalya Province. The team have competed in the Süper Lig since their first-ever promotion to the top flight in 2016. Home matches are played at the Alanya Oba Stadium, a compact, all-seater ground with a capacity of 9,789.

The club's traditional colours are orange and green, adopted in 1982 following a statute change. In June 2022 the club confirmed a naming-rights agreement with Corendon, after which the professional football team have competed as Corendon Alanyaspor.

Founded in 1948, Alanyaspor rose through the national pyramid and established themselves in the top tier in the late 2010s. The club's best league finish to date is fifth place in the 2019–20 Süper Lig, a season in which they also reached the Turkish Cup final; Trabzonspor won the decider 2–0 in Istanbul.

The same campaign qualified Alanyaspor for Europe for the first time; they entered the UEFA Europa League in 2020–21 and were eliminated 1–0 away to Rosenborg in a single-leg third qualifying round tie played behind closed doors during the COVID-19 pandemic.

== History ==
=== Foundation and early years ===
Alanyaspor were founded in 1948 by Dr. Ali Nazım Köseoğlu and local youth as an amateur side first known as Alanya Kalespor, later Kale Gençlikspor; the early kit colours were blue–white. The club competed at amateur level until gaining full affiliation for 1965–66, when they entered the Antalya Amateur League in red–white.

In May 1982 a statute change under chairman Hüseyin Arıkan adopted the present orange–green identity and the name “Alanyaspor”. With the creation of Turkey's professional TFF 3. Lig in 1984–85, Alanyaspor were admitted to the TFF 3. Lig—the first professional team from Alanya while construction of Alanya Oba Stadium was finally completed.

=== First promotions and cup runs (1987–2005) ===
Under president Necati Azakoğlu the team won their TFF 3. Lig group in 1987–88 and earned promotion to the TFF 2. Lig for the first time. The club reached the sixth round of the Turkish Cup in 1993–94. Relegation back to the TFF 3. Lig followed in 1996–97, before a return as TFF 3. Lig champions in 2003–04.

Alanyaspor topped their group in 2005–06 and reached the promotion group, then the Ankara play-offs, but were eliminated by Pendikspor.

The team led their classification group in 2007–08 and, in the Turkish Cup, defeated top-flight Sivasspor 1–0 to qualify for the groups for the first time; they faced Fenerbahçe on 23 January 2008 at Milli Egemenlik Stadium in Alanya, losing 10–3, and finished the group without points against Kayserispor, Şanlıurfaspor and Gaziantepspor. In 2008–09 they again reached the groups after eliminating Gençlerbirliği 2–1, drawing with Sivasspor and Manisaspor, but losing to Denizlispor and Konyaspor.

=== Rebuild and rise (2010–16) ===
The club narrowly avoided relegation in 2009–10 and placed 16th in 2010–11. A leadership crisis in 2011 brought a short interim by Mevlüthan Çavuşoğlu before Hasan Çavuşoğlu was elected with broad support; he would oversee the modern rise.

Alanyaspor finished 9th in 2012–13; during winter camp they hosted Galatasaray in a friendly at Alanya Oba Stadium. In 2013–14, after a notable 2–1 friendly win over Fenerbahçe, Alanyaspor finished second in the 2. Lig (Red Group) and won the promotion play-offs beating Amed and Ankaragücü before a penalty shoot-out victory over Hatayspor to reach the TFF 1. Lig.

Before 2014–15 the team played as “Albimo Alanyaspor” via a naming-rights deal, finishing third but losing the play-off semi-final to Samsunspor. In 2015–16, renamed “Multigroup Alanyaspor”, they again finished third and this time won promotion to the Süper Lig for the first time by defeating Adana Demirspor on penalties in the final.

=== Establishment in the top flight (2016–present) ===
Alanyaspor's debut Süper Lig campaign in 2016–17 opened under promotion-winning coach Hüseyin Kalpar, but a rugged first half of the season led to his resignation on 16 January 2017. The club appointed former Bosnia and Herzegovina national coach Safet Sušić ten days later to steer the spring run-in. A key piece of their adaptation was the late-summer signing of Brazilian striker Vágner Love on a two-year deal, who finished the season as the league's top scorer with 23 goals. With Sušić stabilizing results and Love's goals providing punch, Alanyaspor secured mid-table safety and closed their first top-flight season on 40 points matching the tally they would post again the following year.

Alanyaspor's second top-flight campaign 2017–18 brought another year of consolidation as the team finished 12th on 40 points in the Süper Lig, maintaining safety with a late-season uptick in form. In 2018–19 the club climbed into the top half, ending the season 9th with 44 points, aided by improved defensive numbers and consistent home results in Alanya.

The 2019–20 campaign was a high-water mark: Alanyaspor finished 5th on 57 points to secure European qualification and reached the Turkish Cup final, where they were narrowly beaten 2–0 by Trabzonspor in the Atatürk Olympic Stadium on 29 July 2020. As a result of the 2019–20 finish, Alanyaspor debuted in UEFA competition in 2020–21 but fell 1–0 away to Rosenborg in a one-off UEFA Europa League qualifying tie affected by the pandemic schedule; domestically they sustained form to claim 7th with 60 points and reached the Turkish Cup semi-finals (lost 2–0 to Antalyaspor).

In 2021–22 Alanyaspor put together one of the best seasons in club history, finishing 5th with 64 points after a mid-season managerial handover to Francesco Farioli, whose positional play approach stabilized results down the stretch. The 2022–23 campaign proved more turbulent; despite strong attacking spells, defensive fragility left the team 15th on 41 points, safely above the relegation places but short of the previous year's standards.

A managerial reset under Fatih Tekke in 2023–24 delivered a solid rebound to 8th with 52 points after his early-November appointment was followed by an extended unbeaten run that secured a comfortable top-half finish. In 2024–25 the club settled mid-table again, finishing 12th with 45 points as squad churn was balanced by a consistent home record and incremental minutes for academy graduates under Tekke's staff.

In January 2024 FIFA imposed a three-window transfer ban on the club for a registration dispute; the sanction was reported in Turkish media and later confirmed in federation bulletins.

From a 1948 amateur start to their 2016 promotion, Alanyaspor's modern trajectory has featured professionalisation, a sequence of naming-rights eras, and consistent top-flight consolidation, punctuated by a first European appearance (2020) and repeated cup runs, alongside the deep shock of Josef Šural's death in 2019 events that collectively shape the club's contemporary identity.

== Supporters ==
Alanyaspor's organised supporter scene grew rapidly after the club's rise through the professional tiers in the 2010s. An earlier umbrella group known as the “Alanyasporlular Derneği” (Alanyaspor Fans Association) formally wound itself up in 2017, announcing that it had completed its mission and encouraging independent terrace groups to continue matchday organisation. In the Süper Lig era, support has centred on the Maraton (sideline) and Kale Arkası (behind-the-goal) sections at Alanya Oba Stadium; in 2022 local media reported that multiple fan groups agreed to unite in the Kale Arkası in an effort to raise a louder, coordinated atmosphere.

Ticketing and season-ticket demand has been covered regularly by the local press, with the club publicising price bands and sales windows each summer as interest has increased with sustained top-flight participation.

Alanyaspor's principal regional rivalry is with Antalyaspor; meetings are commonly branded in the press as the “Akdeniz derbisi” (Mediterranean derby) and have featured coordinated choreography and tifo from both sets of fans, as well as periodic club-led initiatives to keep the rivalry within sporting boundaries.

Matchdays in Alanya are also shaped by the district's unusually large foreign-resident population and tourist presence, which bring a visible contingent of international spectators to league fixtures. Recent academic and official figures put foreign residents at over 13% of Alanya's population in 2022, with tens of thousands of residence-permit holders registered in the district context that helps explain the club's multilingual communications and diverse crowds.

The club itself has periodically hosted joint events with supporter groups to reinforce a positive stadium culture and relations with visiting fans particularly around high-profile fixtures.

== Stadium ==
Alanyaspor play their home matches at the Alanya Oba Stadium, a municipal, multi-purpose venue in the Oba neighbourhood on Alanya's eastern side. The ground is an all-seater with a capacity of roughly 10,000; official municipal planning documents list 10,846 seats, while recent press reports round attendance capacity to about 9,784 depending on the match configuration and safety adjustments.

Ahead of the club's first Süper Lig season, the municipality carried out upgrading works at Oba seat replacements, turnstiles, improved lighting and media areas so the venue would meet top-flight requirements. Over time the ground has also carried naming-rights titles; between the mid-2010s it was marketed as “Bahçeşehir Okulları Staium,” and for the 2022–23 season it was briefly branded “Kırbıyık Holding Stadium” under a local sponsorship agreement. The Turkish Football Federation lists the ground in its facility register as “Alanyaspor Alanya Oba Stadium.”

Before moving permanently to Oba, the club used the Alanya Milli Egemenlik Stadium a smaller, older, multi-use ground closer to the town centre for league and cup fixtures as well as training. Local authority listings give its capacity around 1,200 (with basic covered stands), reflecting its role as a secondary facility once Oba became the primary venue.

Independent stadium databases also describe Oba as a compact, football-specific ground used largely by Alanyaspor since the early 2010s, following years of stop-start local stadium construction in the district.

== Rivalry with Antalyaspor ==
Alanyaspor's principal rivalry is with Antalyaspor, the older metropolitan club from the provincial capital of Antalya. The fixture, widely known as the Akdeniz Derbisi (Mediterranean Derby), became a regular top-flight event after Alanyaspor's promotion to the Süper Lig in 2016, transforming local bragging rights within Antalya Province between the coastal hubs of Antalya and Alanya into a nationally recognised derby.

Local authorities have periodically implemented away-fan bans and heightened security measures around the derby. In January 2024, the Antalya Governor's Office announced that visiting supporters would not be admitted for a league match in Alanya, a precaution mirrored in other seasons depending on match risk assessments.

On the pitch the derby has featured narrow scorelines and frequent swings in momentum. National and local media often frame it as pivotal for European qualification races or mid-table positioning. In March 2024, for example, Antalyaspor secured a 2–1 home win, described by press outlets as a significant result in the provincial rivalry. Alanyaspor themselves frequently underline the derby's symbolic weight in official communications and marketing campaigns. Broadcasters routinely package it as the showpiece fixture of Antalya Province, highlighting its competitive and cultural pull.

== Statistics ==
=== Results of League and Cup Competitions by Season ===
Season	League table										Turkish Cup	UEFA	Top scorer	
Season	League	Pos	P	W	D	L	GF	GA	GD	Pts	Turkish Cup	UEFA	Player	Goals
1948–84	~~During these years, the club competed in the Amateur League.~~													
1984–85	3. Lig	11th	26	6	6	14	27	48	−21	24	~~N/A.~~	DNQ	~~N/A.~~	~~N/A.~~
1985–86	3. Lig	5th	24	16	3	5	40	22	+18	51	R4	DNQ	~~N/A.~~	~~N/A.~~
1986–87	3. Lig	2th	30	20	7	3	64	21	+43	67	R1	DNQ	~~N/A.~~	~~N/A.~~
1987–88	3. Lig	1st↑	32	21	9	2	71	25	+46	72	R2	DNQ	~~N/A.~~	~~N/A.~~
1988–89	2. Lig	4th	34	16	7	11	51	41	+10	55	R2	DNQ	Erdoğan Paslı	8
1989–90	2. Lig	5th	32	11	13	8	44	43	+1	46	R2	DNQ	Erdoğan Paslı	16
1990–91	2. Lig	10th	34	11	10	13	54	53	+1	43	R1	DNQ	Erdoğan Paslı	13
1991–92	2. Lig	5th	34	15	8	11	51	47	+4	53	R1	DNQ	Ahmet Hacıosmanoğlu	13
1992–93	2. Lig	7th	32	12	9	11	35	32	+3	45	L16	DNQ	İsmail Güler	10
1993–94	2. Lig	5th	32	12	9	11	34	49	−15	45	R1	DNQ	Celil Odabaşı	9
1994–95	2. Lig	8th	32	13	7	12	32	37	−5	46	R4	DNQ	Erdoğan Paslı	11
1995–96	2. Lig	8th	32	10	7	15	36	46	−10	37	R	DNQ	Erdoğan Paslı	7
1996–97	2. Lig	10th↓	32	6	5	21	26	69	−43	23	R3	DNQ	~~N/A.~~	~~N/A.~~
1997–98	3. Lig	7th	32	14	10	8	53	48	+5	52	~~N/A.~~	DNQ	~~N/A.~~	~~N/A.~~
1998–99	3. Lig	15th	32	7	12	13	35	46	−11	33	~~N/A.~~	DNQ	~~N/A.~~	~~N/A.~~
1999–00	3. Lig	13th	32	9	9	14	32	43	−11	36	~~N/A.~~	DNQ	~~N/A.~~	~~N/A.~~
2000–01	3. Lig	4th	32	6	15	11	48	47	+1	33	~~N/A.~~	DNQ	Murat Gökhan Çelebi	15
2001–02	3. Lig	12th	34	12	8	14	54	47	+7	7	~~N/A.~~	DNQ	Murat Gökhan Çelebi	17
2002–03	3. Lig	11th	28	10	5	13	32	32	0	35	~~N/A.~~	DNQ	Murat Gökhan Çelebi	4
2003–04	3. Lig	1st↑	32	20	6	6	59	30	+29	66	~~N/A.~~	DNQ	Murat Gökhan Çelebi	12
2004–05	2. Lig	2nd	32	16	9	7	64	34	+30	57	~~N/A.~~	DNQ	Murat Gökhan Çelebi	14
2005–06	2. Lig	7th	37	18	5	14	53	44	+9	59	R1	DNQ	Nedim Vatansever	13
2006–07	2. Lig	4th	38	17	16	5	65	48	+17	67	R2	DNQ	Nedim Vatansever	16
2007–08	2. Lig	3rd	33	18	3	12	55	34	+21	58	GS	DNQ	Nedim Vatansever	17
2008–09	2. Lig	5th	36	14	10	12	59	47	+12	52	GS	DNQ	Nedim Vatansever	15
2009–10	2. Lig	8th	36	11	11	14	47	60	−13	44	~~N/A.~~	DNQ	Dündar Denizhan	10
2010–11	2. Lig	14th	34	9	8	17	35	54	−19	35	~~N/A.~~	DNQ	Fatih Arat	17
2011–12	2. Lig	11th	32	9	15	8	26	28	−2	42	~~N/A.~~	DNQ	Adem Gökçe	5
2012–13	2. Lig	9th	32	12	5	15	34	33	+1	41	R2	DNQ	Cihan Özkaymak	9
2013–14	2. Lig	2nd↑	39	26	7	6	82	37	+45	85	R3	DNQ	Aydın Çetin	16
2014–15	1. Lig	3rd	34	17	6	11	55	40	+15	57	R3	DNQ	Jonathan Ayite	20
2015–16	1. Lig	3rd↑	34	17	10	7	60	38	+22	61	R2	DNQ	Jonathan Ayite	13
2016–17	Süper Lig	12th	34	12	4	18	54	65	−11	40	R2	DNQ	Vagner Love	23
2017–18	Süper Lig	12th	34	11	7	16	55	59	−4	40	R2	DNQ	Emre Akbaba	14
2018–19	Süper Lig	9th	34	12	8	14	37	43	−6	44	R5	DNQ	Papiss Cissé	16
2019–20	Süper Lig	5th	34	16	9	9	61	37	+24	57	RU	DNQ	Papiss Cissé	26
2020–21	Süper Lig	7th	40	17	9	14	58	45	+13	60	SF	3QR	Davidson	12
2021–22	Süper Lig	5th	38	19	7	12	67	58	+9	64	SF	DNQ	Emre Akbaba	13
2022–23	Süper Lig	15th	36	11	8	17	54	70	−16	41	L16	DNQ	Ahmed Hassan	11
2023–24	Süper Lig	8th	38	12	16	10	53	50	+3	52	R5	DNQ	Oğuz Aydın	13
2024–25	Süper Lig	13th	36	12	9	15	43	50	−7	45	GS	DNQ	Sergio Córdova	10
2025–26	Süper Lig	TBD												

=== Domestic leagues affiliation ===
- Süper Lig: 2016–
- 1. Lig: 2014–16
- 2. Lig: 1988–97, 2004–14
- 3. Lig: 1984–88, 1997–04
- Amateur Level: 1948–84

== Alanyaspor in Europe ==
Alanyaspor made their European debut in the 2020–21 UEFA Europa League, entering at the third qualifying round and facing Rosenborg in Trondheim on 24 September 2020; the Turkish side lost 1–0 at Lerkendal, ending their maiden continental campaign at the first hurdle. The tie was a single-leg match played behind closed doors under UEFA's one-off COVID-19 qualifying format for 2020–21. Local coverage before the game also noted that the fixture would mark Alanyaspor's first ever European match.

=== Summary ===
Competition	Pld	W	D	L	GF	GA	GD
UEFA Europa League	0	0	0	1	0	1	–1
Total	0	0	0	1	0	1	–1

=== Results ===
Season	Competition	Round	Club	Home	Away	Aggregate
2020–21	UEFA Europa League	Q3	(Norway) Rosenborg	—N/a	0−1	—N/a (Note: not applicable — UEFA switched Europa League qualifying to a single-leg format in 2020–21 because of COVID-19, so Alanyaspor’s tie consisted of one away match, a 0–1 loss at Rosenborg.)

=== UEFA Ranking history ===
Season	Rank	Points	Ref.
2021	182 ▲	6.020	
2022	248 ▼	5.420	
2023	206 ▲	6.420	

As of 21 June 2023

== Honours ==
- 1. Lig (second tier)
  - Play-off winner: 2015–16
- 2. Lig (third tier)
  - Play-off winner: 2013–14
- 3. Lig (fourth tier)
  - Winners: 1987–88, 2003–04
- Turkish Cup
  - Runners-up: 2019–20

== Players ==
=== Current squad ===
As of 4 September 2026

Note: Flags indicate national team as defined under FIFA eligibility rules; some limited exceptions apply. Players may hold more than one non-FIFA nationality.

No.	Pos.	Nation	Player
1	GK	TUR	Mahmut Can Kara
3	DF	POR	Nuno Lima
4	DF	TUR	Bedirhan Özyurt
5	DF	KOS	Fidan Aliti (captain)
7	MF	TUR	İbrahim Kaya
8	MF	TUR	Enes Keskin
9	FW	TUN	Omar Ben Ali
10	MF	ROU	Ianis Hagi
11	MF	BRA	Ruan
12	FW	COD	Meschak Elia
14	MF	TUR	Emre Demir
16	FW	KOR	Hwang Ui-jo
17	FW	TUR	Arda Usluoğlu
19	FW	CMR	Iván Cédric

No.	Pos.	Nation	Player
20	DF	TUR	Fatih Aksoy
22	FW	ESP	Paolo Fernandes (on loan from AEK Athens)
23	GK	TUR	Mert Bayram
26	MF	TUR	İzzet Çelik
28	FW	TUR	Şahin Dik
32	MF	CIV	Arouna Soro
42	MF	CGO	Gaius Makouta
44	DF	TUR	Bilal Demirağ
48	GK	BRA	Paulo Victor
55	MF	TUR	Baran Ali Gezek
58	MF	ANG	Maestro
88	MF	TUR	Yusuf Özdemir
94	DF	KOS	Florent Hadergjonaj

=== Out on loan ===
Note: Flags indicate national team as defined under FIFA eligibility rules; some limited exceptions apply. Players may hold more than one non-FIFA nationality.

No.	Pos.	Nation	Player
—	DF	TUR	Eren Altıntaş (at Sebat SK until 30 June 2027)
—	DF	TUR	Nejdet Bilin (at Alanya 1221 FSK until 30 June 2027)
—	DF	TUR	Buluthan Bulut (at Muğlaspor until 30 June 2027)
—	DF	BRA	Bruno Viana (at Qingdao West Coast until 31 December 2026)

No.	Pos.	Nation	Player
—	MF	TUR	Emirhan Çavuş (at 12 Bingölspor until 30 June 2027)
—	MF	TUR	Yusuf Can Karademir (at Yalova FK 77 SK until 30 June 2027)
—	FW	TUR	Osman Arslantaş (at Eskişehirspor until 30 June 2027)

=== Retired numbers ===
No.	Player	Nationality	Position	Alanyaspor debut	Last match	Ref
90	Josef Šural	Czech Republic	Forward	17 January 2019	6 April 2019	

== Non-playing staff ==
=== Administrative staff ===
Position	Name
President	(Turkey) Hasan Çavuşoğlu
Second President	(Turkey) Kamil Köseoğlu
Vice President	(Turkey) Bilal Gömeç
Vice President	(Turkey) Hasan Uysal
Vice President	(Turkey) Nihat Tufan
Vice President	(Turkey) Muzaffer Barcın
Vice President	(Turkey) Ahmet Paşaoğlu
Vice President	(Turkey) Metin Fahri Özçelik
Vice President	(Turkey) Ahmet Cebeci
General Secretary	(Turkey) Mevlüt Görücü
Deputy Chairman	(Turkey) Aycan Fenercioğlu
Deputy Chairman	(Turkey) Ramazan Caner
Deputy Chairman	(Turkey) Ahmet Saz
Deputy Chairman	(Turkey) Murat Topçu
Deputy Chairman	(Turkey) Enver Vural
Deputy Chairman	(Turkey) Mehmet Ali Yetgin
Board Member	(Turkey) Anıl Övençoğlu
Board Member	(Turkey) Cuma Kadıoğlu
Board Member	(Turkey) Yakup Şimşek
Board Member	(Turkey) Fahri Gürses
Board Member	(Turkey) Hüsamettin Akyüz
Board Member	(Turkey) Mehmet Uslu
Board Member	(Turkey) Metin Kırbıyık
Board Member	(Turkey) Muhammet Çetin
Board Member	(Turkey) Mehmet Kuş
Board Member	(Turkey) Ahmet Çiğdem
Board Member	(Turkey) Veysi Aladağ
Board Member	(Turkey) Fazlı Ciğerli
Board Member	(Turkey) Abdullah Çalış

=== Coaching staff ===
Position	Name
Head coach	João Pereira
Assistant Coach	(Portugal) Pedro Guerreiro
Assistant Coach	(Portugal) Jose Caldeira
Assistant Coach	(Portugal) Antonio Pina
Goalkeeping Coach	(Portugal) João Godinho
Goalkeeping Coach	(Turkey) Mehmet Altundal
Athletic Coach	(Portugal) Fabio Santos
Performance Coach	(Portugal) João Ferreira
Fitness Coach	(Turkey) Ali Can Sümbül
