= Ruan (footballer, born 2005) =

Brazilian footballer

Personal information
- Full name: Ruan Pereira Duarte
- Date of birth: 3 May 2005 (age 21)
- Place of birth: Caxias do Sul, Brazil
- Height: 1.72 m (5 ft 8 in)
- Position: Forward

Team information
- Current team: Alanyaspor
- Number: 11

Youth career
- 2016–2022: Juventude

Senior career*
Years	Team	Apps	(Gls)
2022–2024	Juventude	53	(2)
2024–2025	Portimonense	35	(3)
2025–	Alanyaspor	29	(2)
- * Club domestic league appearances and goals as of 15 August 2026

Ruan Pereira Duarte (born 3 May 2005), simply known as Ruan, is a Brazilian professional footballer who plays as a forward for Turkish Süper Lig club Alanyaspor.

== Club career ==
Born in Caxias do Sul, Rio Grande do Sul, Ruan joined Juventude's youth setup in 2016, aged eleven. On 5 August 2022, he signed his first professional contract with the club, for three years.

Ruan made his first team – and Série A – debut on 3 September 2022, coming on as a late substitute for Óscar Ruiz in a 1–1 home draw against Avaí.

On 1 August 2024, Ruan joined Liga Portugal 2 side Portimonense on a four-year deal.

On 12 September 2025, Ruan signed a five-year contract with Alanyaspor in Turkey.

== Career statistics ==
As of 22 February 2024

Club	Season	League			State League		Cup		Continental		Other		Total	
Club	Season	Division	Apps	Goals	Apps	Goals	Apps	Goals	Apps	Goals	Apps	Goals	Apps	Goals
Juventude	2022	Série A	11	0	0	0	0	0	—		—		11	0
Juventude	2023	Série B	33	2	0	0	0	0	—		—		33	2
Juventude	2024	Série A	0	0	2	0	0	0	—		—		2	0
Career total			44	2	2	0	0	0	0	0	0	0	46	2
