= FK Sarajevo Youth School =

FK Sarajevo Academy
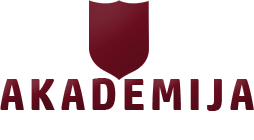
- Full name: Akademija Fudbalskog kluba Sarajevo
- Nicknames: Bordo-Bijeli (The Maroon-Whites); Divovi (The Giants)
- Ground: Butmir Training Centre
- Coordinates: 43°52′26″N 18°24′31″E; 43°48′51″N 18°20′08″E
- Owner: Ismir Mirvić
- Chairman: Ismir Mirvić
- Academy Director: Tomislav Gričar
- Website: https://fksarajevo.ba/kategorija/omladinski-pogon
Home colours	Away colours

The FK Sarajevo Youth School (Bosnian: Omladinski pogon Fudbalskog kluba Sarajevo), is the youth department for Bosnian football club FK Sarajevo and is considered to be the best in the country.

The department was initially split into two sections. Namely, The Asim Ferhatović Hase School of Football (Bosnian: Škola fudbala Asim Ferhatović Hase), named after legendary striker Asim Ferhatović, and the FK Sarajevo Academy (Bosnian: Akademija fudbalskog kluba Sarajevo). Until its dissolution in 2021, the football school functioned as both a general model for the popularization of the sport and as a filtering mechanism, used to pick out locally based footballing talents which are later transferred to the academy. The academy, in turn, is a top-of-the-line boarding school which brings in the biggest talents from Bosnia and Herzegovina and organizes the competitive youth selections for the club. The Youth school has teams for the Under-8 through to the Under-16 age groups, while the academy is split into the U-15 (younger cadets), U-17 (older cadets) and U-19 (junior) selections.

The department was founded in the 1950s and has been historically known as one of the best youth systems in the former Yugoslavia. Its training philosophy is not only the development of football players, but also the care for the players' growth, education and character formation, while teaching the sporting spirit and loyalty to the club. The youth teams, besides national competitions, participate in numerous tournaments around Europe, testing their skills against some of the best European clubs. Tournaments the club's youth selection traditionally take part in include Kvarnerska Rivijera, Trofeo Dossena, Generali CEE Cup and the Karol Wojtyla Cup.

FK Sarajevo's youth selections train in two venues. Namely, the Asim Ferhatović Hase Sports Complex and the elite Butmir Training Centre.

== Youth squads ==
As of 10 December 2024

=== Sarajevo U-19 squad ===
Note: Flags indicate national team as defined under FIFA eligibility rules; some limited exceptions apply. Players may hold more than one non-FIFA nationality.

No.	Pos.	Nation	Player
—	GK	BIH	Ensar Cucak
—	GK	BIH	Faris Mehić (captain)
—	GK	BIH	Filip Petrović
—	DF	BIH	Elnes Alajmović
—	DF	BIH	Riad Bajrović
—	DF	BIH	Deni Memišević
—	DF	BIH	Sergej Popović
—	DF	BIH	Ali Sokolović
—	DF	BIH	Mican Stokanović
—	MF	BIH	Din Bračković
—	MF	BIH	Amar Cerić

No.	Pos.	Nation	Player
—	MF	BIH	Sergej Ignatkov
—	MF	BIH	Abdulkerim Mehmedspahić
—	MF	BIH	Emman Merdžanović
—	MF	BIH	Vedad Suljić
—	MF	BIH	Kenan Vrban
—	FW	BIH	Bakir Koso
—	FW	BIH	Harun Pločo
—	FW	BIH	Aleksa Popović
—	FW	BIH	Deni Šabić
—	FW	BIH	Ahmed Tiro

=== Sarajevo U-17 squad ===
Note: Flags indicate national team as defined under FIFA eligibility rules; some limited exceptions apply. Players may hold more than one non-FIFA nationality.

No.	Pos.	Nation	Player
—	GK	BIH	Hajrudin Šehić
—	GK	BIH	Ibrahim Zahirović
—	DF	BIH	Edib Dazdarević
—	DF	BIH	Din Karamehmedović
—	DF	BIH	Ismet Mujkić
—	DF	BIH	Amil Muminović
—	DF	BIH	Muamer Osmanović
—	MF	BIH	Mahir Fejzić
—	MF	BIH	Emin Hrnjić
—	MF	BIH	Nidal Mehić
—	MF	BIH	Kamran Mujan
—	MF	BIH	Ivano Perić

No.	Pos.	Nation	Player
—	MF	BIH	Mak Pita
—	MF	BIH	Amer Sirćo
—	MF	BIH	Kenan Vrban (captain)
—	FW	BIH	Kerim Bajrović
—	FW	BIH	Ajdin Grbić
—	FW	BIH	Vedad Husović
—	FW	BIH	Anes Mehemdović
—	FW	BIH	Deni Nuhanović
—	FW	BIH	Alan Pajević
—	FW	BIH	Andrija Pejaković
—	FW	BIH	Amel Sirćo

== Youth Academy staff ==
As of 15 January 2026, the staff includes:

Current staff
- U-19 Coach: Eldin Čengić
- U-19 Assistant Coach: Jasmin Nuhanović
- U-17 Coach: Amer Dupovac
- U-15 Coach: Memnun Suljagić
- U-15 Coach: Džemal Berberović
- Fitness Coach: Emir Mustafović
- Goalkeeping Coach: Adnan Salman
- Team Manager: Ismar Hadžiosmanović
- Physiotherapist: Sanjin Selmanović
- Physiotherapist: Nedžad Vrabac

== European record ==
Season	Round	Opponent	Home	Away	Agg.
2023–24	1R	(Ukraine) Rukh Lviv	1–3	1–1	1–4
2024–25	1R	(North Macedonia) AP Brera Strumica	2–0	2–2	4–2
2024–25	2R	(Israel) Maccabi Petah Tikva	3–0	3–0	6–0 (Note: Maccabi Petah Tikva withdrew from the competition.)
2024–25	3R	(Turkey) Trabzonspor	2–2	1–6	3–8
