= 2020–21 FK Sarajevo season =

Sarajevo
2020–21 season
- Owner: Nguyễn Hoài Nam (60%); Vincent Tan (30%)
- Chairman: Senad Jahić (until 22 January); Damir Kasum (from 3 February)
- Manager: Vinko Marinović (until 12 May); Dženan Uščuplić (caretaker, from 13 May)
- Stadium: Asim Ferhatović Hase Stadium
- Premier League BiH: 2nd
- Cup of BiH: Winners
- UEFA Champions League: Second qualifying round
- UEFA Europa League: Play-off round
- Top goalscorer: League: Benjamin Tatar; Matthias Fanimo (10); All: Benjamin Tatar; Matthias Fanimo (13)
- Biggest win: Sarajevo 5–1 Mladost Doboj Kakanj (30 October 2020)
- Biggest defeat: Sarajevo 0–2 Borac (17 April 2021)
Home colours	Away colours	Third colours

The 2020–21 Sarajevo season was the club's 72nd season in existence, and their 27th consecutive season in the top flight of Bosnian football, the Premier League of BiH. Besides competing in the Premier League, the team competed in the National Cup as well. Sarajevo also competed in the qualifications for the UEFA Champions League and the qualifications for the UEFA Europa League.

In that season Sarajevo won the cup title. The club qualified to the 2021–22 UEFA Europa Conference League qualifying rounds.

== Squad information ==
=== First-team squad ===
As of 20 February 2021

Note: Flags indicate national team as defined under FIFA eligibility rules; some limited exceptions apply. Players may hold more than one non-FIFA nationality.

No.	Pos.	Nation	Player
1	GK	BIH	Muhamed Šahinović
2	DF	BIH	Dušan Hodžić
3	DF	BIH	Selmir Pidro
5	DF	BIH	Hamza Bešić
6	MF	CRO	Mirko Oremuš
7	MF	BIH	Anel Hebibović (captain)
8	MF	BIH	Zinedin Mustedanagić
9	FW	BIH	Mersudin Ahmetović (vice-captain)
10	FW	BIH	Jasmin Mešanović
11	FW	MKD	Krste Velkoski (captain)
13	GK	BIH	Vladan Kovačević (captain)
14	MF	BIH	Tarik Ramić
15	DF	CRO	Hrvoje Miličević
16	GK	SLO	Elvis Džafić
17	MF	BIH	Dal Varešanović

No.	Pos.	Nation	Player
18	DF	BIH	Dino Islamović
19	MF	BIH	Faruk Hodžić
20	MF	BIH	Đani Salčin
21	MF	SRB	Aleksandar Pejović
22	MF	BIH	Ivan Jukić
23	FW	BIH	Kenan Dervišagić
24	MF	BIH	Andrej Đokanović
26	GK	BIH	Adnan Kanurić
27	FW	BIH	Slobodan Milanović
28	FW	BIH	Haris Handžić
29	DF	BIH	Amer Dupovac (captain)
31	MF	BIH	Tino-Sven Sušić
38	FW	ENG	Matthias Fanimo
45	MF	GHA	Joachim Adukor
47	FW	MNE	Boris Cmiljanić

== Transfers ==
=== In ===
Date	Pos.	Player	From	Fee	Ref.
17 July 2020	MF	(Bosnia and Herzegovina) Zinedin Mustedanagić	(Czech Republic) Sparta Prague	Undisclosed	
24 July 2020	FW	(England) Matthias Fanimo	(Bosnia and Herzegovina) Mladost Doboj Kakanj	€40,000	
13 August 2020	MF	(Serbia) Aleksandar Pejović	(Serbia) Radnički Niš	Free transfer	
8 September 2020	MF	(Ghana) Joachim Adukor	(Hungary) Diósgyőri	Free transfer	
12 October 2020 (Note: Because of an error in FIFA TMS system, Kanurić officially joined the club on 12 March 2021.)	GK	(Bosnia and Herzegovina) Adnan Kanurić	(Slovakia) Sereď	Free transfer	
31 October 2020	MF	(Bosnia and Herzegovina) Dal Varešanović	(England) Liverpool U21	Free transfer	
4 February 2021	FW	(Montenegro) Boris Cmiljanić	(Slovakia) Slovan Bratislava	Free transfer	
22 February 2021	FW	(Bosnia and Herzegovina) Jasmin Mešanović	(Slovenia) Maribor	Free transfer	
Total				€40,000	

=== Out ===
Date	Pos.	Player	To	Fee	Ref.
2 June 2020	DF	(Serbia) Darko Lazić	(Serbia) Radnički Niš	End of contract	
15 June 2020	MF	(Bosnia and Herzegovina) Aladin Šišić	(Bosnia and Herzegovina) Olimpik	End of contract	
24 June 2020	GK	(Bosnia and Herzegovina) Matej Marković	(Slovakia) Zemplín Michalovce	Contract termination	
30 June 2020	MF	(Serbia) Nebojša Gavrić	(Serbia) Bačka	End of contract	
1 July 2020	FW	(Croatia) Mario Crnički	(Germany) Energie Cottbus	End of contract	
23 July 2020	DF	(Bosnia and Herzegovina) Mufid Salčinović	(Bosnia and Herzegovina) Čapljina	End of contract	
25 July 2020	FW	(Bosnia and Herzegovina) Ahmed Hasanović	(Bosnia and Herzegovina) Olimpik	Contract termination	
31 July 2020	MF	(Bosnia and Herzegovina) Alen Mustafić	(Slovakia) Slovan Bratislava	€120,000	
1 January 2021	FW	(Bosnia and Herzegovina) Armin Šarić	Free agent	Contract termination	
19 January 2021	MF	(Bosnia and Herzegovina) Amar Rahmanović	(Turkey) Konyaspor	€375,000	
7 February 2021	FW	(Bosnia and Herzegovina) Benjamin Tatar	(Saudi Arabia) Abha	€290,000	
27 May 2021	MF	(Serbia) Aleksandar Pejović	(Serbia) Radnički Niš	Contract termination	
Total				€785,000	

=== Loans in ===
Start date	End date	Pos.	Player	From	Ref.
19 June 2020	31 December 2020	DF	(Bosnia and Herzegovina) Besim Šerbečić	(Norway) Rosenborg	

=== Loans out ===
Start date	End date	Pos.	Player	To	Ref.
1 July 2020	31 December 2020	FW	(Bosnia and Herzegovina) Kenan Dervišagić	(Bosnia and Herzegovina) Rudar Kakanj	
9 July 2020	31 December 2020	DF	(Bosnia and Herzegovina) Numan Kurdić	(Serbia) Novi Pazar	
10 July 2020	31 December 2020	MF	(Bosnia and Herzegovina) Ševkija Resić	(Serbia) Novi Pazar	
13 July 2020	End of season	MF	(Bosnia and Herzegovina) Amar Sabljica	(Bosnia and Herzegovina) Igman Konjic	
25 July 2020	End of season	DF	(Bosnia and Herzegovina) Armin Imamović	(Bosnia and Herzegovina) Olimpik	
29 July 2020	End of season	MF	(Bosnia and Herzegovina) Haris Konjalić	(Bosnia and Herzegovina) Vis Simm-Bau	
31 July 2020	End of season	MF	(Bosnia and Herzegovina) Amar Jašarević	(Bosnia and Herzegovina) Radnik Hadžići	
3 August 2020	31 December 2020	FW	(Bosnia and Herzegovina) Slobodan Milanović	(Bosnia and Herzegovina) Olimpik	
2 October 2020	End of season	FW	(Brazil) Nathan	(Bosnia and Herzegovina) Olimpik	
18 January 2021	End of season	MF	(Bosnia and Herzegovina) Ševkija Resić	(Bosnia and Herzegovina) Sloboda Tuzla	
27 January 2021	End of season	DF	(Bosnia and Herzegovina) Numan Kurdić	(Albania) Kukësi	
11 February 2021	End of season	GK	(Bosnia and Herzegovina) Belmin Dizdarević	(Bosnia and Herzegovina) Mladost Doboj Kakanj	
11 February 2021	End of season	DF	(Bosnia and Herzegovina) Halid Šabanović	(Bosnia and Herzegovina) Mladost Doboj Kakanj	

== Kit ==
Supplier	Sponsor
(United States) Nike, Inc.	(Turkey) Turkish Airlines

== Pre-season and friendlies ==
Win Draw Loss Fixtures

5 July 2020 Friendly	Bosna Visoko (Bosnia and Herzegovina)	0–1	(Bosnia and Herzegovina) Sarajevo	Visoko
18:30		Report	Tatar 23'	Stadium: Luke Stadium

12 July 2020 Friendly	Sarajevo (Bosnia and Herzegovina)	4–0	(Bosnia and Herzegovina) Goražde	Butmir
18:30	Ahmetović 16'; Jukić 30'; Mujanović 77' (o.g.); Velkoski 84' (pen.)	Report		Stadium: Butmir Training Centre

15 July 2020 Friendly	Sarajevo (Bosnia and Herzegovina)	1–1	(Bosnia and Herzegovina) Sloboda Tuzla	Butmir
17:30	Dupovac 90+2'	Report	Husejinović 30'	Stadium: Butmir Training Centre; Referee: Irfan Peljto (Sarajevo)

19 July 2020 Friendly	Sarajevo (Bosnia and Herzegovina)	2–1	(Bosnia and Herzegovina) Bratstvo Gračanica	Butmir
17:30	Velkoski 32'; Bešić 67'	Report	Aletić 80' (pen.)	Stadium: Butmir Training Centre

26 July 2020 Friendly	Sarajevo (Bosnia and Herzegovina)	2–1	(Bosnia and Herzegovina) GOŠK Gabela	Butmir
17:30	Handžić 65', 84'	Report	Simeunović 44'	Stadium: Butmir Training Centre; Referee: Admir Šehović (Sarajevo)

20 January 2021 Friendly	Višići (Bosnia and Herzegovina)	0–2	(Bosnia and Herzegovina) Sarajevo	Ljubuški
13:00		Report	Dervišagić 11'; Handžić 57'	Stadium: Babovac Stadium

26 January 2021 Friendly	Sarajevo (Bosnia and Herzegovina)	3–0	(Bosnia and Herzegovina) Rudar Kakanj	Butmir
13:30	Handžić 35'; Tatar 71'; Mustedanagić 77'	Report		Stadium: Butmir Training Centre

30 January 2021 Friendly	Sarajevo (Bosnia and Herzegovina)	1–4	(Slovenia) Domžale	Umag, Croatia
12:00	Jukić 51'	Report	Jakupović 4'; Dobrovoljc 37'; Martinović 72', 87'	Stadium: Stella Maris Football Camp

2 February 2021 Friendly	Sarajevo (Bosnia and Herzegovina)	1–0	(Bulgaria) Levski Sofia	Umag, Croatia
14:30	Handžić 56'	Report		Stadium: Stella Maris Football Camp

8 February 2021 Friendly	Sarajevo (Bosnia and Herzegovina)	1–0	(Slovenia) Triglav Kranj	Umag, Croatia
15:00	Mustedanagić 72'	Report		Stadium: Stella Maris Football Camp

21 February 2021 Friendly	Sarajevo (Bosnia and Herzegovina)	1–1	(Bosnia and Herzegovina) Goražde	Butmir
14:30	Pejović 8'	Report	Jazvin 32'	Stadium: Butmir Training Centre

== Competitions ==
=== Overview ===
Competition	First match	Last match	Starting round	Final position	Record							
Competition	First match	Last match	Starting round	Final position	Pld	W	D	L	GF	GA	GD	Win %
Premier League	2 August 2020	30 May 2021	Matchday 1	2nd	33	18	11	4	53	24	+29	54.55
Cup of BiH	13 October 2020	26 May 2021	First round	Winner	6	6	0	0	13	3	+10	100.00
Champions League	18 August 2020	26 August 2020	First qualifying round	Second qualifying round	2	1	0	1	3	2	+1	50.00
Europa League	24 September 2020	1 October 2020	Third qualifying round	Play-off round	2	1	0	1	2	2	+0	50.00
Total					43	26	11	6	71	31	+40	60.47

Source: Competitions

=== Premier League ===
==== League table ====
Pos	Team	Pld	W	D	L	GF	GA	GD	Pts	Qualification or relegation
1	Borac Banja Luka (C)	33	21	4	8	59	31	+28	67	Qualification for the Champions League first qualifying round
2	Sarajevo	33	18	11	4	53	24	+29	65	Qualification to Europa Conference League first qualifying round
3	Velež Mostar	33	16	13	4	50	30	+20	61	Qualification to Europa Conference League first qualifying round
4	Široki Brijeg	33	17	8	8	47	30	+17	59 (Note: Since fourth place decided UEFA Europa Conference League qualification, goal difference and goals scored were not used to rank teams. Head-to-head points: Široki Brijeg 6, Zrinjski Mostar 3.)	Qualification to Europa Conference League first qualifying round
5	Zrinjski Mostar	33	18	5	10	50	30	+20	59	

Source: Rezultati.com
Rules for classification: 1) Points; 2) Goal difference; 3) Goals scored; 4) Head-to-head points; 5) Head-to-head goal difference; 6) Head-to-head away goals (only if two teams); 7) Head-to-head goals scored; 8) Goal difference; 9) Play-off. (Criteria 2 and 3 are not used to decide champion, UEFA competition qualification, or relegation)
(C) Champions

==== Results summary ====
Overall								Home						Away					
Pld	W	D	L	GF	GA	GD	Pts	W	D	L	GF	GA	GD	W	D	L	GF	GA	GD
33	18	11	4	53	24	+29	65	12	3	2	31	11	+20	6	8	2	22	13	+9

Source: Sportsport.ba

==== Results by round ====
Round	1	2	3	4	5	6	7	8	9	10	11	12	13	14	15	16	17	18	19	20	21	22	23	24	25	26	27	28	29	30	31	32	33
Ground	A	A	H	A	H	A	H	A	H	A	H	H	H	A	H	A	H	A	H	A	H	A	H	H	A	H	A	H	A	H	A	H	A
Result	W	D	W	W	D	W	W	W	D	W	W	W	W	D	W	D	W	D	W	D	L	L	W	W	L	L	D	W	D	D	D	W	W
Position	3	4	2	4	5	3	1	1	1	1	1	1	1	1	1	1	1	1	1	1	1	1	1	1	1	1	2	1	2	2	2	2	2

Source: Competitions
A = Away; H = Home; W = Win; D = Draw; L = Loss

==== Matches ====
2 August 2020 1	Krupa	0–2	Sarajevo	Krupa na Vrbasu
17:30	Karišik (yellow card) 40'; Makitan (yellow card) 45' (yellow-red card) 70'; Maksimović (yellow card) 70'	Report	Šerbečić (yellow card) 43'; Velkoski 48'; Tatar 71' (pen.); Oremuš (yellow card) 88'	Stadium: Gradski Stadion; Attendance: 0 Referee: Mateo Musa (Čitluk)

8 August 2020 2	Mladost Doboj Kakanj	2–2	Sarajevo	Doboj
17:00	Marić (yellow card) 36'; Nikolić (yellow card) 58'; Hadžić 61'; Alić 80'; Mašić (yellow card) 90+4'	Report	Rahmanović (yellow card) 39'; Tatar 59' (pen.); Handžić 67'	Stadium: MGM Farm Arena; Attendance: 0 Referee: Miloš Gigović (Gradiška)

12 August 2020 3	Sarajevo	1–0	Tuzla City	Sarajevo
17:00	Ahmetović 34'; Tatar (yellow card) 54'; Đokanović (yellow card) 66'; Rahmanović (yellow card) 72'; Oremuš (yellow card) 75'	Report	Barišić (yellow card) 56'; Rustemović (yellow card) 72'	Stadium: Asim Ferhatović Hase Stadium; Attendance: 0 Referee: Luka Bilbija (Prijedor)

23 August 2020 5	Sarajevo	1–1	Velež	Sarajevo
19:00	Oremuš (yellow card) 10'; Handžić (yellow card) 11'; Jukić 59'; Rahmanović (yellow card) 78'; Dupovac (yellow card) 90+1'	Report	Cheshmedjiev (yellow card) 35'; Ćosić 44', (yellow card) 85'; Vehabović (yellow card) 58'; Zvonić (yellow card) 66'	Stadium: Asim Ferhatović Hase Stadium; Attendance: 0 Referee: Dragan Petrović (Banja Luka)

31 August 2020 6	Radnik	0–2	Sarajevo	Bijeljina
18:00	Popara (yellow card) 42'	Report	Dupovac 18'; Ahmetović (yellow card) 31', (goal) 32'; Pejović (yellow card) 82'	Stadium: Gradski stadion Attendance: 0 Referee: Zoran Grbić (Prijedor)

11 September 2020 7	Sarajevo	4–2	Borac	Sarajevo
20:00	Danilović 16' (o.g.); Rahmanović 39'; Tatar 73', 90'	Report	Milojević (yellow card) 25' (yellow-red card) 46'; Ziljkić 37'; Brtan (yellow card) 44'; Danilović 71', (yellow card) 78'	Stadium: Asim Ferhatović Hase Stadium; Attendance: 0 Referee: Elvis Mujić (Banovići)

16 September 2020 4 (Note: Match of Round 4 postponed because of Sarajevo's participation in UEFA Champions League first qualifying round.)	Olimpik	1–3	Sarajevo	Sarajevo
16:30	Zeba (yellow card) 43'; Milović (yellow card) 57'; Imamović (yellow card) 77'; Hasanović 85'	Report	Tatar 21', 82', (yellow card) 65'; Rahmanović (yellow card) 42'; Hebibović 86'	Stadium: Otoka Stadium; Attendance: 0 Referee: Admir Šehović (Sarajevo)

20 September 2020 8	Sloboda Tuzla	2–3	Sarajevo	Tuzla
18:00	Jusić 42'; Beganović 89'	Report	Fanimo 27', 77'; Oremuš (yellow card) 30'; Šerbečić (yellow card) 37'; Ahmetović 44'; Sušić (yellow card) 58'; Pidro (yellow card) 70'; Handžić (yellow card) 90+3'	Stadium: Tušanj City Stadium; Attendance: 0 Referee: Zoran Grbić (Prijedor)

5 October 2020 10	Zrinjski	2–3	Sarajevo	Mostar
18:00	Bilbija 4' (pen.), 70'; Zlomislić (yellow card) 16'; Sadiku (yellow card) 57'	Report	Miličević (yellow card) 3'; Sušić (yellow card) 12'; Handžić (yellow card) 17'; Tatar (yellow card) 38'; Sadiku 47' (o.g.); Hebibović 82'; Hodžić (yellow card) 90+5'	Stadium: Stadion pod Bijelim Brijegom; Attendance: 0 Referee: Luka Bilbija (Prijedor)

17 October 2020 11	Sarajevo	2–0	Široki Brijeg	Sarajevo
19:05	Handžić 39'; Rahmanović 80'	Report	Mašić (yellow card) 60'	Stadium: Asim Ferhatović Hase Stadium; Attendance: 0 Referee: Dragan Petrović (Banja Luka)

25 October 2020 12	Sarajevo	3–0	Krupa	Sarajevo
17:00	Tatar 6' (pen.); Rahmanović 32', 49'; Islamović (yellow card) 90'	Report		Stadium: Asim Ferhatović Hase Stadium; Attendance: 0 Referee: Dražen Marić (Bijeljina)

30 October 2020 13	Sarajevo	5–1	Mladost Doboj Kakanj	Sarajevo
17:00	Velkoski (yellow card) 20', (goal) 22'; Handžić 28', 35'; Rahmanović 54'; Mustedanagić 90'	Report	Hadžić 70'	Stadium: Asim Ferhatović Hase Stadium; Attendance: 0 Referee: Elvis Mujić (Banovići)

4 November 2020 9 (Note: Match of Round 9 postponed because of Sarajevo's participation in UEFA Europa League play-off round.)	Sarajevo	1–1	Željezničar	Sarajevo
20:00	Kovačević (yellow card) 24'; Rahmanović 38'; Handžić (yellow card) 43'; Šerbečić (yellow card) 58'; Jukić (yellow card) 67'; Fanimo (yellow card) 77'	Report	Kosorić (yellow card) 28'; Alispahić 66'	Stadium: Asim Ferhatović Hase Stadium; Attendance: 0 Referee: Irfan Peljto (Sarajevo)

8 November 2020 14	Tuzla City	0–0	Sarajevo	Tuzla
13:00	Barišić (yellow card) 19' (yellow-red card) 44'; Hodžić (yellow card) 89'	Report	Tatar (yellow card) 25'; Bešić (yellow card) 61'	Stadium: Tušanj City Stadium; Attendance: 0 Referee: Ermin Sivac (Zenica)

22 November 2020 15	Sarajevo	2–0	Olimpik	Sarajevo
15:00	Tatar 27'; Handžić (yellow card) 36'; Fanimo 59'; Hebibović (yellow card) 77'	Report	Milović (yellow card) 36'; Imamović (yellow card) 70'	Stadium: Asim Ferhatović Hase Stadium; Attendance: 0 Referee: Danijel Bojo (Kiseljak)

28 November 2020 16	Velež	0–0	Sarajevo	Mostar
15:00	Radović (yellow card) 29'; Zeljković (yellow card) 78'	Report	Handžić (yellow card) 40'; Tatar (yellow card) 63' (yellow-red card) 64'; Hebibović (yellow card) 66'; Pejović (yellow card) 86'	Stadium: Stadion Rođeni; Attendance: 0 Referee: Frano Jelić (Široki Brijeg)

2 December 2020 17	Sarajevo	2–1	Radnik	Sarajevo
17:00	Pejović (yellow card) 66'; Sušić 89'; Fanimo 90'	Report	Nikić (yellow card) 52'; Lazić 88', (yellow card) 89'	Stadium: Asim Ferhatović Hase Stadium; Attendance: 0 Referee: Mateo Musa (Čitluk)

6 December 2020 18	Borac	2–2	Sarajevo	Banja Luka
17:00	Ziljkić 19'; Dujaković (yellow card) 49'; Brtan (yellow card) 55'; Vranješ 64'; Cruz (yellow card) 76'; Meleg (yellow card) 90+3'	Report	Miličević (yellow card) 52'; Fanimo 60', 85'; Hebibović (yellow card) 70' (yellow-red card) 72'; Hodžić (yellow card) 88'	Stadium: Banja Luka City Stadium; Attendance: 0 Referee: Elvis Mujić (Banovići)

12 December 2020 19	Sarajevo	2–1	Sloboda Tuzla	Sarajevo
17:00	Tatar 22', 27'	Report	Osmić (yellow card) 24'; Predragović (yellow card) 33'; A. Beganović (yellow card) 33'; Uzelac (yellow card) 43'; Devedžić (red card) 48'; Dž. Beganović (yellow card) 59'; Kurtalić 73'; Mehmedović (yellow card) 90+1'	Stadium: Asim Ferhatović Hase Stadium; Attendance: 0 Referee: Zoran Grbić (Prijedor)

1 March 2021 20	Željezničar	0–0	Sarajevo	Sarajevo
17:30	Kosorić (yellow card) 48'; Bojo (yellow card) 64'	Report	Pejović (yellow card) 21'; Miličević (yellow card) 29'; Oremuš (yellow card) 69'; Dupovac (yellow card) 70'; Adukor (yellow card) 90+1'	Stadium: Grbavica Stadium; Attendance: 0 Referee: Irfan Peljto (Sarajevo)

6 March 2021 21	Sarajevo	0–1	Zrinjski	Sarajevo
19:00	Hodžić (yellow card) 86' (yellow-red card) 90+8'; Velkoski (yellow card) 89'	Report	Juranović 4'; Bekić (yellow card) 16'; Magdić (red card) 68'; Yenin (yellow card) 88'; Ljubić (yellow card) 90+4'	Stadium: Asim Ferhatović Hase Stadium; Attendance: 0 Referee: Luka Bilbija (Prijedor)

14 March 2021 22	Široki Brijeg	1–0	Sarajevo	Široki Brijeg
19:00	Čuljak (yellow card) 29'; Begić (yellow card) 31' (yellow-red card) 68'; S. Jurić (yellow card) 47'; Ikić 52', (yellow card) 76'; Maganjić (yellow card) 82'	Report	Handžić (yellow card) 31'; Hebibović (yellow card) 45'; Đokanović (yellow card) 58'; Dupovac (yellow card) 76'; Velkoski (yellow card) 90'	Stadium: Pecara Stadium; Attendance: 0 Referee: Luka Bilbija (Prijedor)

21 March 2021 23	Sarajevo	1–0	Krupa	Sarajevo
15:00	Miličević (yellow card) 22'; Varešanović 58'; Đokanović (yellow card) 83'; Mešanović (yellow card) 85'	Report	Muminović (yellow card) 26'; Palić (yellow card) 62'; Galić (yellow card) 85'	Stadium: Asim Ferhatović Hase Stadium; Attendance: 0 Referee: Antoni Bandić (Grude)

3 April 2021 24	Sarajevo	1–0	Široki Brijeg	Sarajevo
17:00	Fanimo 7'; Pejović (yellow card) 23'; Miličević (yellow card) 86'; Cmiljanić (yellow card) 90'	Report		Stadium: Asim Ferhatović Hase Stadium; Attendance: 0 Referee: Dragan Petrović (Banja Luka)

12 April 2021 25	Velež	1–0	Sarajevo	Mostar
18:00	Hasanović (yellow card) 29'; Miličević 40' (o.g.); Osmić (yellow card) 76'; Ovčina (yellow card) 90'	Report	Handžić (yellow card) 12'; Oremuš (yellow card) 14'; Adukor (yellow card) 17'; Dupovac (yellow card) 56'; Pejović (yellow card) 75'	Stadium: Stadion Rođeni; Attendance: 0 Referee: Luka Bilbija (Prijedor)

17 April 2021 26	Sarajevo	0–2	Borac	Sarajevo
19:00	Miličević (yellow card) 59'; Kovačević (yellow card) 59'; Velkoski (yellow card) 88'; Dupovac (yellow card) 90'	Report	Zakarić 34', 70', (yellow card) 54'; Brtan (yellow card) 56'; Meleg (yellow card) 69'; Subić (yellow card) 74'; Moraitis (yellow card) 86'	Stadium: Asim Ferhatović Hase Stadium; Attendance: 0 Referee: Elvis Mujić (Banovići)

24 April 2021 27	Zrinjski	1–1	Sarajevo	Mostar
19:00	Mašić (yellow card) 20'; Filipović 38'; Juranović (yellow card) 50'	Report	Pejović (yellow card) 25'; Adukor (yellow card) 36'; Velkoski (yellow card) 37'; Fanimo 77'; Oremuš (yellow card) 78'; Đokanović (yellow card) 89'; Hodžić (yellow card) 90'; Jukić (yellow card) 90'	Stadium: Stadion pod Bijelim Brijegom; Attendance: 0 Referee: Frano Jelić (Široki Brijeg)

1 May 2021 28	Sarajevo	3–1	Željezničar	Sarajevo
16:55	Miličević (yellow card) 23'; Dupovac (yellow card) 23'; Fanimo 38', 61'; Mešanović 45'; Oremuš (yellow card) 89'	Report	Kosorić (yellow card) 23'; Ikić (yellow card) 23'; Juričić 72'; Bekrić (yellow card) 90'	Stadium: Asim Ferhatović Hase Stadium; Attendance: 0 Referee: Haris Kaljanac (Sarajevo)

7 May 2021 29	Tuzla City	1–1	Sarajevo	Tuzla
16:00	Nukić (yellow card) 34'; Džafić 43', (yellow card) 87'; Đerić (yellow card) 54'; Morris (yellow card) 74'	Report	Mustedanagić (yellow card) 14', (goal) 22'; Đokanović (yellow card) 45'; Oremuš (red card) 50'; Hebibović (yellow card) 89'	Stadium: Tušanj City Stadium; Attendance: 0 Referee: Dragan Petrović (Banja Luka)

11 May 2021 30	Sarajevo	0–0	Sloboda Tuzla	Sarajevo
18:00	Mustedanagić (yellow card) 43'; Dupovac (yellow card) 61'; Hebibović (yellow card) 90'	Report	Kurtalić (yellow card) 14'; A. Beganović (yellow card) 51'; Golubović (yellow card) 90'	Stadium: Asim Ferhatović Hase Stadium; Attendance: 0 Referee: Ermin Sivac (Zenica)

16 May 2021 31	Mladost Doboj Kakanj	0–0	Sarajevo	Doboj
17:00	Sadiku (yellow card) 21'; Hiroš (yellow card) 75' (yellow-red card) 90'	Report	Pidro (yellow card) 69'; Mustedanagić (yellow card) 81' (yellow-red card) 90'; Mešanović (yellow card) 83'; Fanimo (yellow card) 90'	Stadium: MGM Farm Arena; Attendance: 0 Referee: Antoni Bandić (Grude)

23 May 2021 32	Sarajevo	3–0	Radnik	Sarajevo
17:00	Hebibović (yellow card) 54'; Mešanović 60'; Jukić 65'; Velkoski 69'; Adukor (yellow card) 90'	Report	Šubert (yellow card) 68'; Gogić (yellow card) 79'	Stadium: Asim Ferhatović Hase Stadium; Attendance: 0 Referee: Aleksandar Njegomirović (Prnjavor)

30 May 2021 33	Olimpik	0–3	Sarajevo	Sarajevo
17:00		Report		Stadium: Otoka Stadium

=== Cup of Bosnia and Herzegovina ===
==== Round of 32 ====
13 October 2020	Radnički Lukavac	0–4	Sarajevo	Lukavac
17:00	Kasumović (yellow card) 65'	Report	Handžić 1'; Hebibović 3', 21'; Rahmanović 37'; Mustedanagić (yellow card) 37'; Islamović (yellow card) 68'	Stadium: Stadion Jošik; Attendance: 0 Referee: Sabrija Topalović (Zenica)

==== Round of 16 ====
21 October 2020	Krupa	2–4	Sarajevo	Krupa na Vrbasu
15:00	Maksimović (yellow card) 36'; Makitan 62'; Blažević 87'	Report	Galić 9' (o.g.); Rahmanović 24', 37'; Šerbečić (yellow card) 43'; Đokanović (yellow card) 44'; Fanimo 73'	Stadium: Gradski Stadion; Attendance: 0 Referee: Antoni Bandić (Grude)

==== Quarter-finals ====
10 March 2021	Sarajevo	1–0	Zrinjski	Sarajevo
18:30	Pejović (yellow card) 24'; Handžić 37'; Mešanović (yellow card) 44'; Đokanović (yellow card) 73'	Report	Ćorluka (yellow card) 11'; Filipović (yellow card) 26'; Gačić (red card) 74'; Jakovljević (yellow card) 90'	Stadium: Asim Ferhatović Hase Stadium; Attendance: 0 Referee: Aleksandar Njegomirović (Prnjavor)

==== Semi-finals ====
7 April 2021 First leg	Tuzla City	0–1	Sarajevo	Tuzla
14:00	Doffo (yellow card) 62'	Report	Dupovac (yellow card) 36'; Miličević (yellow card) 40'; Fanimo 56'	Stadium: Tušanj City Stadium; Attendance: 0 Referee: Sabrija Topalović (Zenica)

21 April 2021 Second leg	Sarajevo	3–1	Tuzla City	Sarajevo
17:00	Oremuš (yellow card) 30'; Mešanović (yellow card) 36', (goal) 76'; Hebibović 78'; Velkoski 84'	Report	Brkić (yellow card) 26', (goal) 55'; Karjašević (yellow card) 67'	Stadium: Asim Ferhatović Hase Stadium; Attendance: 0 Referee: Ermin Sivac (Zenica)

=== Final ===
26 May 2021	Sarajevo	0–0 (4–1 p)	Borac	Zenica
17:00	Mešanović (yellow card) 19'; Oremuš (yellow card) 23'	Report	Ćosić (yellow card) 69'	Stadium: Bosnian FA Training Centre; Attendance: 0 Referee: Irfan Peljto (Sarajevo)
	Penalties
	Miličević (penalty scored); Velkoski (penalty scored); Mustedanagić (penalty scored); Handžić (penalty scored)		(penalty missed) Čavić; (penalty missed) Tahrić; (penalty scored) Uzelac

=== UEFA Champions League ===
Sarajevo entered the UEFA Champions League at the first qualifying round.

==== First qualifying round ====
18 August 2020 1Q	Connah's Quay Nomads (Wales)	0–2	(Bosnia and Herzegovina) Sarajevo	Cardiff, Wales
19:00 BST (UTC+1)	Holmes (yellow card) 54'	Report	Tatar 16', 65', (yellow card) 35'; Rahmanović (yellow card) 88'	Stadium: Cardiff City Stadium; Attendance: 0 Referee: Jamie Robinson (Northern Ireland)

==== Second qualifying round ====
26 August 2020 2Q	Dynamo Brest (Belarus)	2–1	(Bosnia and Herzegovina) Sarajevo	Brest, Belarus
21:00 FET (UTC+3)	Gordeichuk 3'; Yuzepchuk (yellow card) 44'; Diallo 49'; Sedko (yellow card) 65'; Kislyak (yellow card) 83'; Khacheridi (yellow card) 90+3'	Report	Đokanović (yellow card) 11', (goal) 34'; Oremuš (yellow card) 45'; Dupovac (yellow card) 76'; Ahmetović (yellow card) 88'; Rahmanović (yellow card) 90+3'	Stadium: Regional Sport Complex Brestsky; Attendance: 0 Referee: Loukas Sotiriou (Cyprus)

=== UEFA Europa League ===
Sarajevo entered the UEFA Europa League at the third qualifying round.

==== Third qualifying round ====
24 September 2020 3Q	Sarajevo (Bosnia and Herzegovina)	2–1	(Montenegro) Budućnost Podgorica	Zenica, Bosnia and Herzegovina
20:00 CEST (UTC+2)	Tatar 4', (yellow card) 45+1'; Rahmanović (yellow card) 28' (yellow-red card) 75'; Ahmetović (yellow card) 35'; Oremuš (yellow card) 53'; Fanimo 67'; Kovačević (yellow card) 89'; Dupovac (yellow card) 90+4'	Report	Sekulić (yellow card) 39'; Moraitis 44'; Adžić (yellow card) 68'; Vujačić (yellow card) 86'	Stadium: Bilino Polje Stadium; Attendance: 0 Referee: José María Sánchez Martínez (Spain)

==== Play-off round ====
1 October 2020 PO	Sarajevo (Bosnia and Herzegovina)	0–1	(Scotland) Celtic	Zenica, Bosnia and Herzegovina
20:00 CEST (UTC+2)	Dupovac (yellow card) 43'; Oremuš (yellow card) 90+3'	Report	Édouard 70'; Frimpong (yellow card) 89'; Klimala (yellow card) 90+3'	Stadium: Bilino Polje Stadium; Attendance: 0 Referee: Benoît Bastien (France)

== Statistics ==
=== Appearances and goals ===
No.	Pos	Nat	Player	Total		Premier League		Cup of BiH		Champions League		Europa League	
No.	Pos	Nat	Player	Apps	Goals	Apps	Goals	Apps	Goals	Apps	Goals	Apps	Goals
Goalkeepers
1	GK	(Bosnia and Herzegovina) BIH	Muhamed Šahinović	1	0	0	0	1	0	0	0	0	0
13	GK	(Bosnia and Herzegovina) BIH	Vladan Kovačević	37	0	29	0	4	0	2	0	2	0
16	GK	(Slovenia) SLO	Elvis Džafić	4	0	2	0	2	0	0	0	0	0
26	GK	(Bosnia and Herzegovina) BIH	Adnan Kanurić	0	0	0	0	0	0	0	0	0	0
Defenders
2	DF	(Bosnia and Herzegovina) BIH	Dušan Hodžić	25	0	11+9	0	3	0	2	0	0	0
3	DF	(Bosnia and Herzegovina) BIH	Selmir Pidro	36	0	26+3	0	3+1	0	1	0	2	0
5	DF	(Bosnia and Herzegovina) BIH	Hamza Bešić	3	0	1	0	0+2	0	0	0	0	0
15	DF	(Croatia) CRO	Hrvoje Miličević	35	0	26	0	6	0	2	0	1	0
18	DF	(Bosnia and Herzegovina) BIH	Dino Islamović	2	0	0+1	0	1	0	0	0	0	0
29	DF	(Bosnia and Herzegovina) BIH	Amer Dupovac	37	1	27+1	1	4+1	0	2	0	2	0
Midfielders
6	MF	(Croatia) CRO	Mirko Oremuš	32	0	23	0	5	0	2	0	2	0
7	MF	(Bosnia and Herzegovina) BIH	Anel Hebibović	24	5	7+12	2	3+2	3	0	0	0	0
8	MF	(Bosnia and Herzegovina) BIH	Zinedin Mustedanagić	16	2	5+8	2	1+2	0	0	0	0	0
14	MF	(Bosnia and Herzegovina) BIH	Tarik Ramić	1	0	0	0	1	0	0	0	0	0
17	MF	(Bosnia and Herzegovina) BIH	Dal Varešanović	1	1	1	1	0	0	0	0	0	0
19	MF	(Bosnia and Herzegovina) BIH	Faruk Hodžić	2	0	0+1	0	0+1	0	0	0	0	0
20	MF	(Bosnia and Herzegovina) BIH	Đani Salčin	12	0	4+6	0	0	0	2	0	0	0
21	MF	(Serbia) SRB	Aleksandar Pejović	30	0	21+2	0	5	0	0	0	2	0
22	MF	(Bosnia and Herzegovina) BIH	Ivan Jukić	30	2	8+16	2	1+2	0	2	0	0+1	0
24	MF	(Bosnia and Herzegovina) BIH	Andrej Đokanović	39	1	23+7	0	5	0	2	1	1+1	0
31	MF	(Bosnia and Herzegovina) BIH	Tino-Sven Sušić	26	1	12+9	1	0+2	0	1	0	2	0
45	MF	(Ghana) GHA	Joachim Adukor	21	0	10+5	0	4+2	0	0	0	0	0
Forwards
9	FW	(Bosnia and Herzegovina) BIH	Mersudin Ahmetović	15	3	5+5	3	1	0	2	0	2	0
10	FW	(Bosnia and Herzegovina) BIH	Jasmin Mešanović	16	3	12	2	4	1	0	0	0	0
11	FW	(North Macedonia) MKD	Krste Velkoski	34	4	17+9	3	3+2	1	1	0	0+2	0
23	FW	(Bosnia and Herzegovina) BIH	Kenan Dervišagić	1	0	0+1	0	0	0	0	0	0	0
27	FW	(Bosnia and Herzegovina) BIH	Slobodan Milanović	13	0	5+4	0	2+2	0	0	0	0	0
28	FW	(Bosnia and Herzegovina) BIH	Haris Handžić	39	7	17+13	5	2+3	2	2	0	0+2	0
38	FW	(England) ENG	Matthias Fanimo	37	13	21+9	10	3+1	2	1	0	2	1
47	FW	(Montenegro) MNE	Boris Cmiljanić	2	0	0+2	0	0	0	0	0	0	0
Players transferred out during the season
10	MF	(Bosnia and Herzegovina) BIH	Amar Rahmanović	19	9	14	6	2	3	2	0	1	0
25	DF	(Bosnia and Herzegovina) BIH	Besim Šerbečić	11	0	7+2	0	1	0	0	0	1	0
32	FW	(Bosnia and Herzegovina) BIH	Benjamin Tatar	22	13	17	10	1	0	2	2	2	1

Number after the "+" sign represents the number of games player started the game on the bench and was substituted on.

=== Goalscorers ===
Rank	No.	Pos.	Nation	Name	Premier League	Cup of BiH	Champions League	Europa League	Total
1	32	FW	(Bosnia and Herzegovina)	Benjamin Tatar	10	0	2	1	13
1	38	FW	(England)	Matthias Fanimo	10	2	0	1	13
2	10	MF	(Bosnia and Herzegovina)	Amar Rahmanović	6	3	0	0	9
3	28	FW	(Bosnia and Herzegovina)	Haris Handžić	5	2	0	0	7
4	7	MF	(Bosnia and Herzegovina)	Anel Hebibović	2	3	0	0	5
5	11	FW	(North Macedonia)	Krste Velkoski	3	1	0	0	4
6	9	FW	(Bosnia and Herzegovina)	Mersudin Ahmetović	3	0	0	0	3
6	10	FW	(Bosnia and Herzegovina)	Jasmin Mešanović	2	1	0	0	3
7	8	MF	(Bosnia and Herzegovina)	Zinedin Mustedanagić	2	0	0	0	2
7	22	MF	(Bosnia and Herzegovina)	Ivan Jukić	2	0	0	0	2
8	17	MF	(Bosnia and Herzegovina)	Dal Varešanović	1	0	0	0	1
8	24	MF	(Bosnia and Herzegovina)	Andrej Đokanović	0	0	1	0	1
8	29	DF	(Bosnia and Herzegovina)	Amer Dupovac	1	0	0	0	1
8	31	MF	(Bosnia and Herzegovina)	Tino-Sven Sušić	1	0	0	0	1
Own goals					2	1	0	0	3
TOTAL					50	13	3	2	68

=== Clean sheets ===
Rank	No.	Nation	Name	Premier League	Cup of BiH	Champions League	Europa League	Total	Games played
1	13	(Bosnia and Herzegovina)	Vladan Kovačević	13	3	1	0	17	37
2	16	(Slovenia)	Elvis Džafić	0	1	0	0	1	4
3	35	(Bosnia and Herzegovina)	Belmin Dizdarević	1	0	0	0	1	1
TOTAL				14	4	1	0	19	42

=== Disciplinary record ===
Includes all competitive matches and only players that got booked throughout the season. The list is sorted by shirt number, and then position.

N	P	Nat.	Name	League			Cup			Europe			Others			Total			Notes
N	P	Nat.	Name	Yellow card	Second yellow card	Red card	Yellow card	Second yellow card	Red card	Yellow card	Second yellow card	Red card	Yellow card	Second yellow card	Red card	Yellow card	Second yellow card	Red card	Notes
1	GK	(Bosnia and Herzegovina)	Vladan Kovačević	2						1						3			
2	DF	(Bosnia and Herzegovina)	Dušan Hodžić	3	1											3	1		
3	DF	(Bosnia and Herzegovina)	Selmir Pidro	2												2			
5	DF	(Bosnia and Herzegovina)	Hamza Bešić	1												1			
6	MF	(Croatia)	Mirko Oremuš	8		1	2			3						13		1	
7	MF	(Bosnia and Herzegovina)	Anel Hebibović	6	1											6	1		
8	MF	(Bosnia and Herzegovina)	Zinedin Mustedanagić	2	1		1			3						6	1		
9	FW	(Bosnia and Herzegovina)	Mersudin Ahmetović	1						2						3			
10	MF	(Bosnia and Herzegovina)	Amar Rahmanović	4			1			1	1					6	1		
10	FW	(Bosnia and Herzegovina)	Jasmin Mešanović	2			3									5			
11	FW	(North Macedonia)	Krste Velkoski	5												5			
15	DF	(Croatia)	Hrvoje Miličević	7			1				1					8	1		
18	DF	(Bosnia and Herzegovina)	Dino Islamović	1			1									2			
21	MF	(Serbia)	Aleksandar Pejović	7			1									8			
22	MF	(Bosnia and Herzegovina)	Ivan Jukić	2												2			
24	MF	(Bosnia and Herzegovina)	Andrej Đokanović	5			2			1						8			
25	DF	(Bosnia and Herzegovina)	Besim Šerbečić	3			1									4			
28	FW	(Bosnia and Herzegovina)	Haris Handžić	7												7			
29	DF	(Bosnia and Herzegovina)	Amer Dupovac	7			1			3						11			
31	MF	(Bosnia and Herzegovina)	Tino-Sven Sušić	2												2			
32	FW	(Bosnia and Herzegovina)	Benjamin Tatar	4	1					2						6	1		
38	FW	(England)	Matthias Fanimo	2												2			
45	MF	(Ghana)	Joachim Adukor	4												4			
47	FW	(Montenegro)	Boris Cmiljanić	1												1			

Source: Competitive matches and fksarajevo.ba
Ordered by (red card) , (second yellow card) and (yellow card)
(yellow card) = Number of bookings; (second yellow card) = Number of sending offs after a second yellow card; (red card) = Number of sending offs by a direct red card.
