= Nihad Sadibašić =

Bosnian footballer

Personal information
- Full name: Nihad Sadibašić
- Date of birth: 10 December 1976 (age 49)
- Place of birth: Vitez, SFR Yugoslavia
- Height: 1.81 m (5 ft 11 in)
- Position: Midfielder

Senior career*
Years	Team	Apps	(Gls)
1995-1999	Travnik	70+	(6+)
1999	Vorwärts Steyr	7	(0)
2000	Đerzelez	15	(2)
2000-2001	Travnik	40	(4)
2001-2003	Velež Mostar	53	(0)
2005-2006	Rudar Kakanj		
2006-2007	Zvijezda Gradačac		
2007-2009	Krajina Cazin		
2009	Vitez		
2010	Bratstvo Gračanica		
2010-2011	Vitez		
2011-2012	Sloga Bosanska Otoka		
2012-2016	Vitez		

International career^{‡}
2001	Bosnia and Herzegovina	1	(0)
2001	Bosnia and Herzegovina XI	1	(0)
- * Club domestic league appearances and goals ‡ National team caps and goals as of 22 June 2021

Nihad Sadibašić (born 10 December 1975) is a Bosnian retired football player.

== Club career ==
He spent half a season in Austria early in his career and still played for Bosnian third tier-side Vitez in 2016, aged 40.

== International career ==
Sadibašić made 2 senior appearances for Bosnia and Herzegovina (1 unofficial), both of them at the January 2001 Millenium Cup: the match against Bangladesh there marked his international debut and his second and final international was against Chile.
