= Adnan Kanurić =

Bosnian footballer (born 2000)

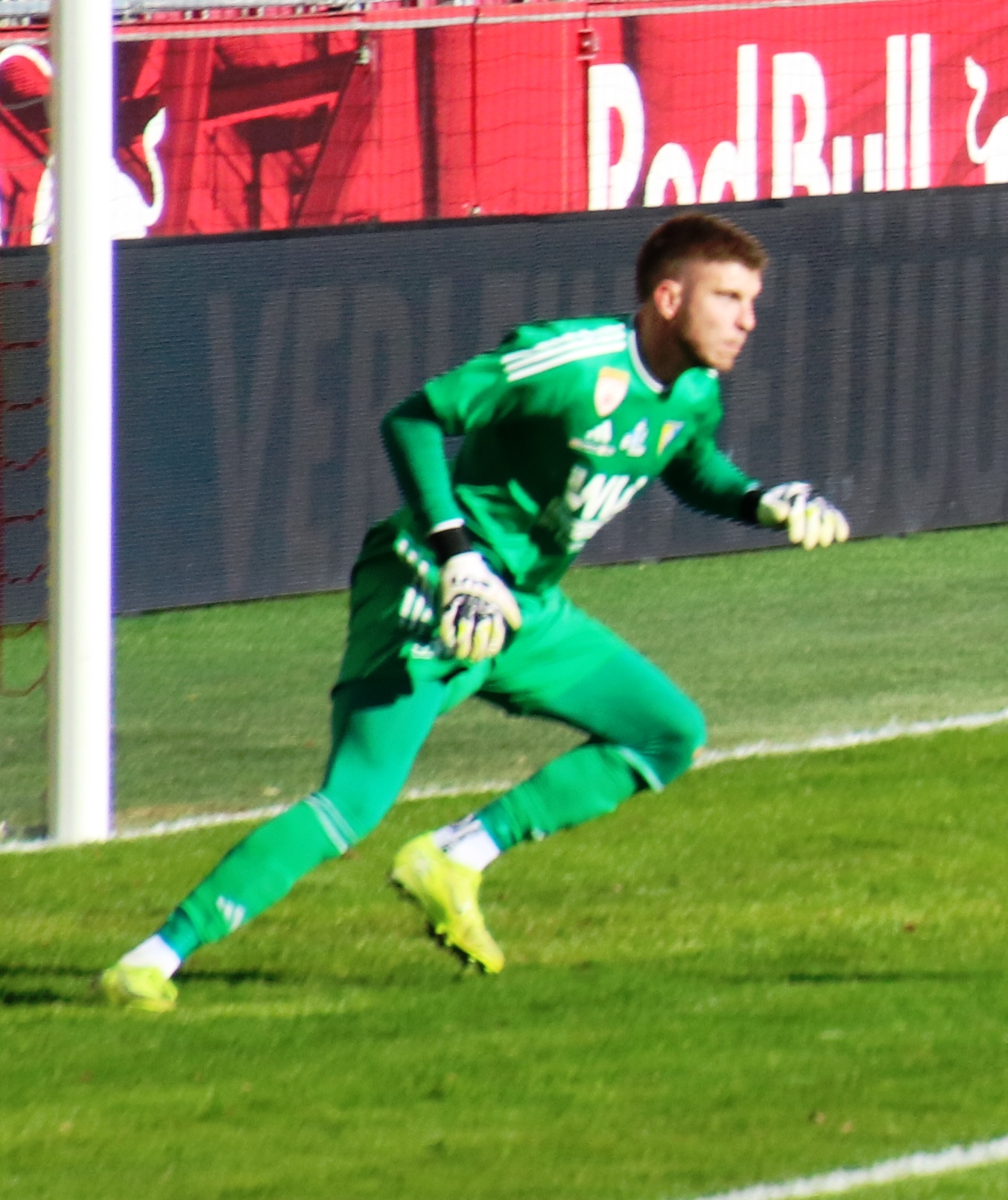

Personal information
- Date of birth: 8 August 2000 (age 26)
- Place of birth: Linz, Austria
- Height: 1.94 m (6 ft 4 in)
- Position: Goalkeeper

Team information
- Current team: Austria Klagenfurt
- Number: 25

Youth career
- –2011: LASK Linz
- 2011–2017: Red Bull Salzburg
- 2012–2013: Liefering
- 2017: SV Deutz 05
- 2018: Fortuna Köln
- 2018–2019: Stoke City

Senior career*
Years	Team	Apps	(Gls)
2019–2020	Stoke City	0	(0)
2019–2020	→ Grantham Town (loan)	12	(0)
2020	Sereď	9	(0)
2020–2022	Sarajevo	3	(0)
2022–2023	Nottingham Forest	0	(0)
2023	→ Oxford City (loan)	13	(0)
2023–2024	Palermo	0	(0)
2024–2025	Lafnitz	14	(0)
2025–	Austria Klagenfurt	19	(0)

International career^{‡}
2016	Bosnia and Herzegovina U17		
2018	Bosnia and Herzegovina U18	5	(0)
2017–2018	Bosnia and Herzegovina U19	10	(0)
2019–2021	Bosnia and Herzegovina U21	3	(0)
- * Club domestic league appearances and goals as of 17 May 2026 ‡ National team caps and goals as of 11 June 2021

Adnan Kanurić (born 8 August 2000) is a professional footballer who plays as a goalkeeper for Austrian club Austria Klagenfurt. Born in Austria, he has represented Bosnia and Herzegovina at several youth international levels up to the under-21s.

== Club career ==
=== Stoke City ===
Kanurić joined Stoke City in August 2018. On 3 November 2019, he was loaned out to Grantham Town for two months. Kanurić played nine games in total for the club before the deal was terminated to allow a free transfer in early 2020.

=== iClinic Sereď ===
On 7 February 2020, Fortuna Liga club iClinic Sereď confirmed the signing of Kanurić on a deal until summer 2022. He made his Fortuna Liga debut for Sereď against Ružomberok on 15 February 2020.

=== Sarajevo ===
In October 2020, Kanurić joined Bosnian Premier League club Sarajevo.

=== Nottingham Forest ===
On 20 September 2022, Kanurić signed with Premier League side Nottingham Forest on a free transfer. On 4 February 2023, he moved on loan to National League South side Oxford City for the remainder of the season, gaining the clubs first promotion to the conference league

Kanurić was released by Forest by the end of the 2022–23 season.

=== Palermo ===
On 12 September 2023, he joined Palermo.

== International career ==
Kanurić represented Bosnia and Herzegovina at all youth levels.

== Career statistics ==
=== Club ===
As of match played 19 July 2021.

Appearances and goals by club, season and competition
Club	Season	League			Cup		Continental		Total	
Club	Season	Division	Apps	Goals	Apps	Goals	Apps	Goals	Apps	Goals
Sereď	2019–20	Slovak Super Liga	8	0	0	0	—		8	0
Sereď	2020–21	Slovak Super Liga	1	0	0	0	—		1	0
Sereď	Total		9	0	0	0	—		9	0
Sarajevo	2020–21	Bosnian Premier League	0	0	0	0	—		0	0
Sarajevo	2021–22	Bosnian Premier League	1	0	0	0	2	0	3	0
Sarajevo	Total		1	0	0	0	2	0	3	0
Career total			10	0	0	0	2	0	12	0

== Honours ==
Sarajevo

- Bosnian Cup: 2020–21
