= Ivan Jukić (footballer) =

Bosnian footballer (born 1996)

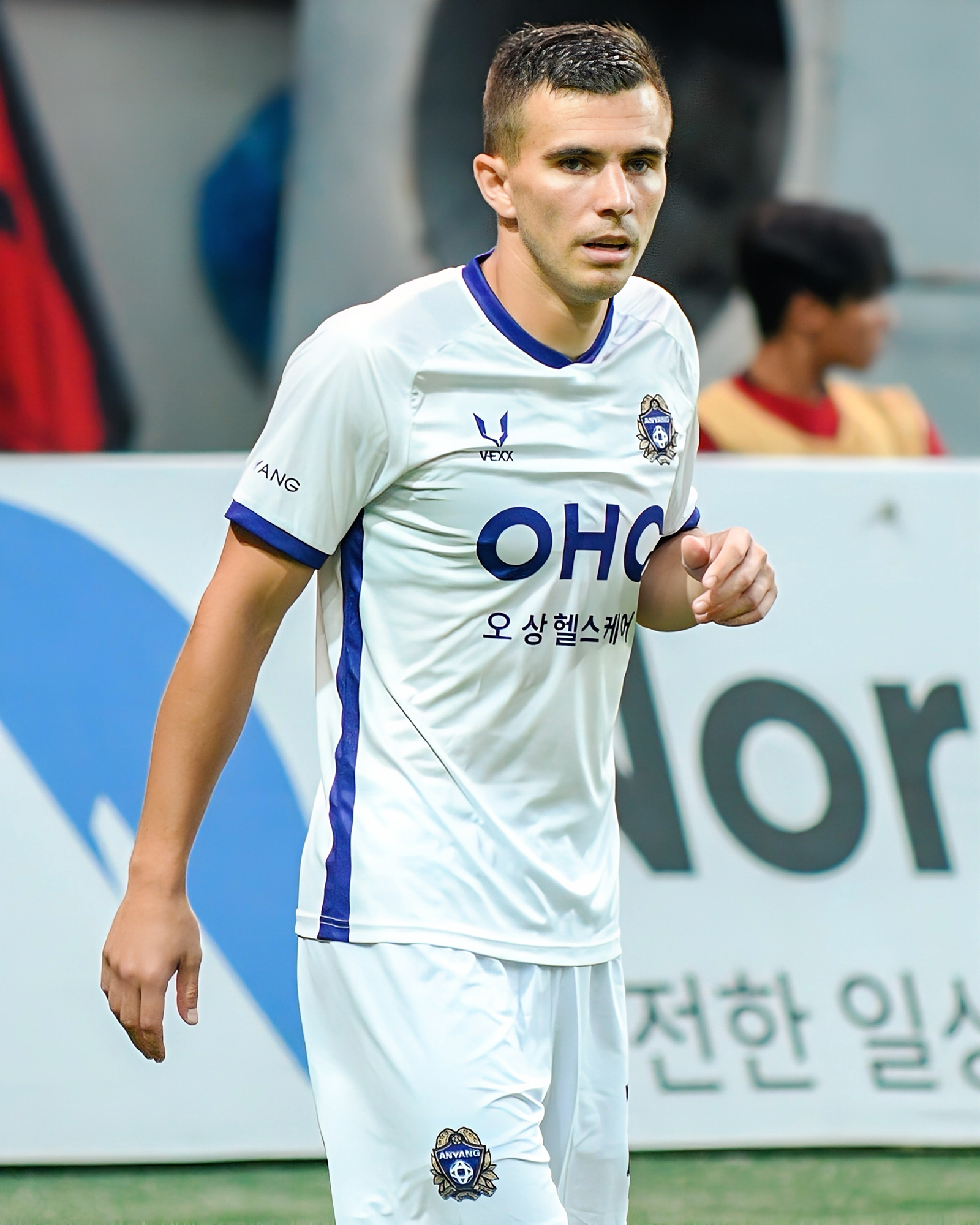
- Jukić in 2025

Personal information
- Date of birth: 21 June 1996 (age 30)
- Place of birth: Split, Croatia
- Height: 1.76 m (5 ft 9 in)
- Position: Winger

Team information
- Current team: Anyang
- Number: 10

Youth career
- 2002–2009: Vitez
- 2009–2011: Orkan Dugi Rat
- 2011–2012: RNK Split
- 2012: Dugopolje
- 2012–2014: RNK Split

Senior career*
Years	Team	Apps	(Gls)
2014–2017	RNK Split	23	(1)
2016	→ Imotski (loan)	12	(2)
2017–2020	Korona Kielce	53	(7)
2020–2021	Sarajevo	27	(2)
2021–2024	Zrinjski Mostar	61	(9)
2024–2025	Široki Brijeg	12	(4)
2025–	Anyang	19	(3)

International career
2014	Croatia U18	1	(0)
2017–2018	Bosnia and Herzegovina U21	5	(0)
- * Club domestic league appearances and goals as of 3 August 2026

Ivan Jukić (Croatian pronunciation: [ǐʋan jûkitɕ]; born 21 June 1996) is a professional footballer who plays as a winger for K League 1 club FC Anyang. Born in Croatia, he represented Bosnia and Herzegovina at youth international level.

== Club career ==
=== Early career ===
Jukić started training football in his native Vitez at the age of 6, before he moved with his family to Dugi Rat in Croatia, where he joined the local club. At the age of 15, he moved to RNK Split, for which he debuted professionally on 15 February 2014 against Dinamo Zagreb, at the age of 17. On 7 December 2014, he scored his first senior goal in the city derby against Hajduk Split. In 2016, he had a brief loan stint with Imotski.

=== Korona Kielce ===
In July 2017, Jukić signed a two-year deal with Polish Ekstraklasa club Korona Kielce on a free transfer. On 17 July, he debuted in a league game against Zagłębie Lubin. Two weeks later, he scored his first goal for the team against Cracovia. Jukić left the club in January 2020.

=== Sarajevo ===
On 23 January 2020, Jukić signed a two-and-a-half-year contract with Bosnian Premier League club Sarajevo. He made his official debut for Sarajevo in a 6–2 league win against Tuzla City on 22 February 2020. On 1 June 2020, Jukić won his first league title with Sarajevo, though after the 2019–20 Bosnian Premier League season was ended abruptly due to the COVID-19 pandemic in Bosnia and Herzegovina and after which Sarajevo were by default crowned league champions for a second consecutive time. On 18 June 2020, he extended his contract with the club until June 2022. Jukić scored his first goal for Sarajevo on 23 August 2020 in a league game against Velež Mostar.

== International career ==
Jukić played for the Bosnia and Herzegovina U21 national team under head coach Vinko Marinović. He made five appearances for the team, not scoring a goal.

== Career statistics ==
=== Club ===
As of match played 30 November 2025

Appearances and goals by club, season and competition
Club	Season	League			National cup (Note: Includes Croatian Cup, Polish Cup, Bosnian Cup)		Continental		Total	
Club	Season	Division	Apps	Goals	Apps	Goals	Apps	Goals	Apps	Goals
RNK Split	2013–14	1. HNL	2	0	—		—		2	0
RNK Split	2014–15	1. HNL	12	1	1	0	0	0	13	1
RNK Split	2015–16	1. HNL	3	0	—		—		3	0
RNK Split	2016–17	1. HNL	6	0	1	0	—		7	0
RNK Split	Total		23	1	2	0	0	0	25	1
Imotski (loan)	2015–16	2. HNL	12	2	—		—		12	2
Korona Kielce	2017–18	Ekstraklasa	23	4	4	0	—		27	4
Korona Kielce	2018–19	Ekstraklasa	21	3	1	0	—		22	3
Korona Kielce	2019–20	Ekstraklasa	9	0	1	0	—		10	0
Korona Kielce	Total		53	7	6	0	—		59	7
Sarajevo	2019–20	Bosnian Premier League	3	0	—		—		3	0
Sarajevo	2020–21	Bosnian Premier League	24	2	3	0	3 (Note: Two appearances in UEFA Champions League, one appearance in UEFA Europa League)	0	30	2
Sarajevo	Total		27	2	3	0	3	0	33	2
Zrinjski Mostar	2021–22	Bosnian Premier League	22	4	2	0	—		24	4
Zrinjski Mostar	2022–23	Bosnian Premier League	23	3	5	0	8 (Note: Two appearances in UEFA Champions League, six appearances in UEFA Europa Conference League)	0	36	3
Zrinjski Mostar	2023–24	Bosnian Premier League	16	2	2	0	5 (Note: Two appearances in UEFA Champions League, three appearances in UEFA Europa League)	0	23	2
Zrinjski Mostar	Total		61	9	9	0	13	0	83	9
Široki Brijeg	2024–25	Bosnian Premier League	12	4	6	1	—		18	5
FC Anyang	2025	K League 1	11	3	—		—		11	3
Career total			199	28	26	1	16	0	241	29

== Honours ==
Sarajevo

- Bosnian Premier League: 2019–20
- Bosnian Cup: 2020–21

Zrinjski Mostar

- Bosnian Premier League: 2021–22, 2022–23
- Bosnian Cup: 2022–23, 2023–24
