= Anes Mašić =

Bosnian footballer (born 2000)

Personal information
- Date of birth: 8 February 2000 (age 26)
- Place of birth: Bugojno, Bosnia and Herzegovina
- Height: 1.89 m (6 ft 2 in)
- Position: Centre-forward

Team information
- Current team: Čelik Zenica
- Number: 99

Youth career
- –2017: Iskra Bugojno
- 2017–2019: Zrinjski Mostar

Senior career*
Years	Team	Apps	(Gls)
2019–2023	Zrinjski Mostar	36	(4)
2019–2020	→ GOŠK Gabela (loan)	14	(10)
2022	→ Posušje (loan)	10	(0)
2023	Travnik	14	(7)
2023–2025	Čelik Zenica	40	(15)
2025	Stupčanica Olovo	13	(3)
2025–	Čelik Zenica	37	(23)

International career
2019–2021	Bosnia and Herzegovina U21	10	(4)
- * Club domestic league appearances and goals as of 31 October 2026

Anes Mašić (born 8 February 2000) is a Bosnian professional footballer who plays as a centre-forward for Bosnian Premier League club Čelik Zenica. A former Bosnia and Herzegovina under-21 international, he has also played for the teams Zrinjski Mostar, GOŠK Gabela, Posušje, Travnik and Stupčanica Olovo.

== Club career ==
=== Zrinjski Mostar ===
Mašić began his career with hometown club Iskra Bugojno before joining the youth system of Zrinjski Mostar in 2017.

He spent the 2019–20 season on loan at GOŠK Gabela, scoring ten league goals and finishing as the division's top scorer.

After returning to Zrinjski, Mašić became part of the first-team squad and scored four league goals during the 2020–21 season. He also scored five goals in the 2020–21 Bosnian Cup, finishing as the competition's top scorer.

During the second half of the 2021–22 season, he played on loan at Posušje. Zrinjski won the league title that season.

=== Travnik and Čelik Zenica ===
Mašić joined Travnik in 2023, scoring seven goals in 14 league appearances. In August that year, he signed for Čelik Zenica.

He scored 13 league goals during his first full season with Čelik and remained with the club until January 2025, when he joined Stupčanica Olovo. Stupčanica won the 2024–25 First League of FBiH title.

=== Return to Čelik ===
Mašić returned to Čelik in July 2025. During the 2025–26 season, he scored 16 league goals as Čelik won the championship and promotion to the Bosnian Premier League. He finished the season as the league's top scorer and was also named its best player.

He remained with Čelik following their promotion for the 2026–27 season.

== International career ==
Mašić represented Bosnia and Herzegovina at under-21 level. He made ten appearances and scored four goals for the team.

== Career statistics ==
As of match played 31 October 2026

Appearances and goals by club, season and competition
Club	Season	League			Bosnian Cup		Continental		Total	
Club	Season	Division	Apps	Goals	Apps	Goals	Apps	Goals	Apps	Goals
GOŠK Gabela (loan)	2019–20	First League of FBiH	14	10	4	2	—		18	12
Zrinjski Mostar	2020–21	Bosnian Premier League	25	4	3	5	2 (Note: Appearances in UEFA Europa League)	0	30	9
Zrinjski Mostar	2021–22	Bosnian Premier League	11	0	2	2	—		13	2
Zrinjski Mostar	Total		36	4	5	7	2	0	43	11
Posušje (loan)	2021–22	Bosnian Premier League	10	0	—		—		10	0
Travnik	2022–23	First League of FBiH	14	7	—		—		14	7
Čelik Zenica	2023–24	First League of FBiH	28	13	2	1	—		30	14
Čelik Zenica	2024–25	First League of FBiH	12	2	2	2	—		14	4
Čelik Zenica	Total		40	15	4	3	—		44	18
Stupčanica Olovo	2024–25	First League of FBiH	13	3	—		—		13	3
Čelik Zenica	2025–26	First League of FBiH	25	16	2	1	—		27	17
Čelik Zenica	2026–27	Bosnian Premier League	12	7	0	0	—		12	7
Čelik Zenica	Total		37	23	2	1	—		39	24
Career total			164	62	15	13	2	0	181	75

== Honours ==
Zrinjski Mostar

- Bosnian Premier League: 2021–22

Stupčanica Olovo

- First League of FBiH: 2024–25

Čelik Zenica

- First League of FBiH: 2025–26

Individual

- First League of FBiH top scorer: 2019–20, 2025–26
- Bosnian Cup top scorer: 2020–21
- First League of FBiH Player of the Season: 2025–26
