= Jasmin Mešanović =

Bosnian association football player

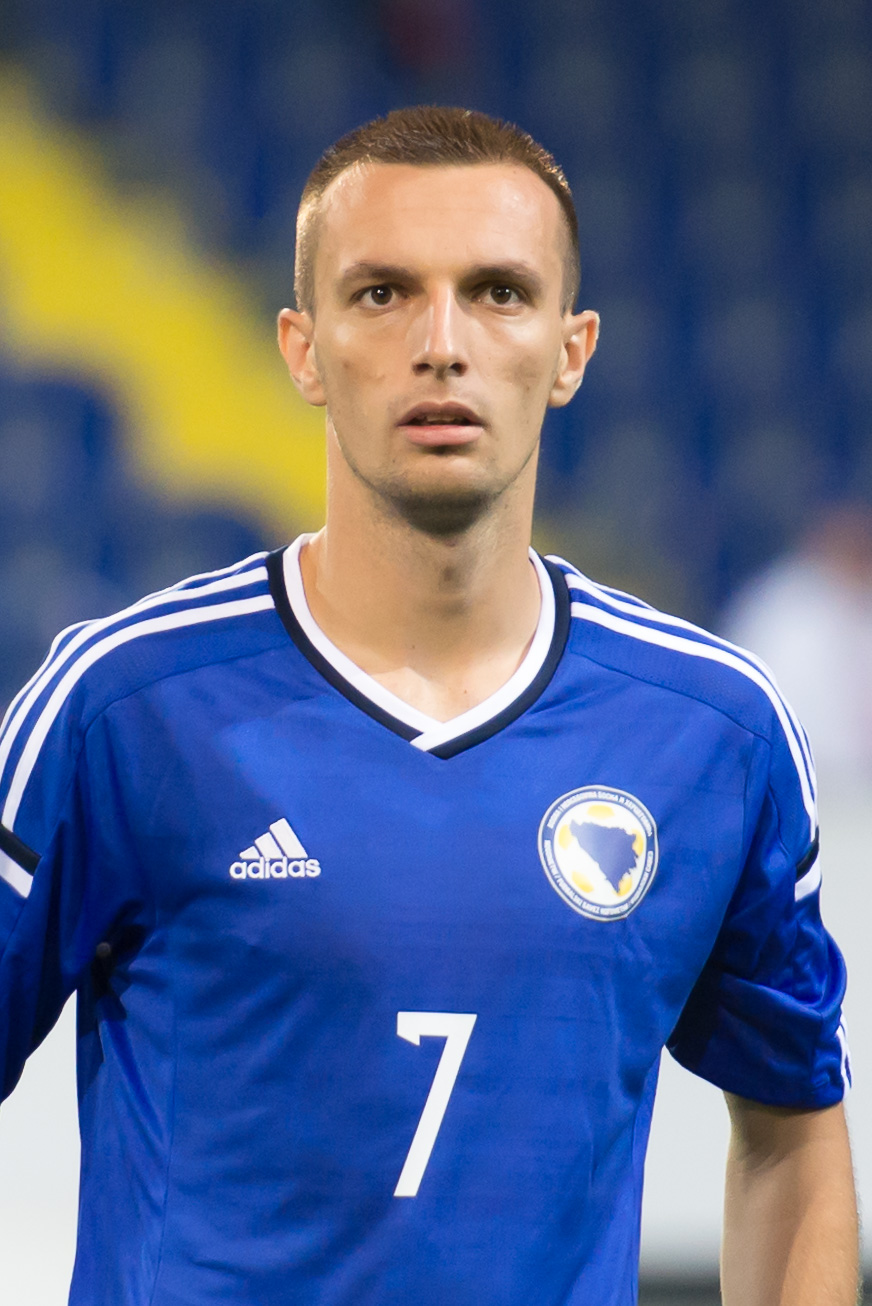
- Mešanović with Bosnia and Herzegovina U21 in 2014

Personal information
- Date of birth: 6 January 1992 (age 34)
- Place of birth: Tuzla, SFR Yugoslavia
- Height: 1.83 m (6 ft 0 in)
- Position: Forward

Team information
- Current team: Kisvárda
- Number: 27

Youth career
- –2010: Sloboda Tuzla

Senior career*
Years	Team	Apps	(Gls)
2010–2012	Sloboda Tuzla	30	(5)
2012–2014	Čelik	54	(20)
2014–2015	Osijek	29	(4)
2015–2017	Zrinjski Mostar	58	(22)
2017–2021	Maribor	105	(21)
2021	Sarajevo	12	(2)
2021–	Kisvárda	144	(33)

International career
2012–2014	Bosnia and Herzegovina U21	9	(2)
2011	Bosnia and Herzegovina	1	(0)
- * Club domestic league appearances and goals as of 30 May 2026

Jasmin Mešanović (Bosnian pronunciation: [jǎsmiːn meʃâːnoʋitɕ]; born 6 January 1992) is a Bosnian professional footballer who plays as a forward for NB II club Kisvárda.

== Club career ==
Mešanović came through Sloboda Tuzla youth ranks, debuting at the age of 18 in April 2010.

He signed with Čelik Zenica in 2012. Mešanović then joined Osijek in July 2014 on a one-year deal.

In June 2015, he transferred to Zrinjski Mostar, signing a two-year contract. In June 2017, after he left Zrinjski on a free transfer, Mešanović signed a three-year deal with Slovenian PrvaLiga side Maribor.

On 20 February 2021, Mešanović returned to the Bosnian Premier League and signed a three-and-a-half-year contract with Sarajevo. He made his official debut for the club on 1 March 2021, in a Sarajevo derby league game against Željezničar. He scored his first goal for Sarajevo against Tuzla City on 21 April 2021, in a 2020–21 Bosnian Cup semi-final. Mešanović won his first trophy with Sarajevo on 26 May 2021, after beating Borac Banja Luka in the Bosnian Cup final.

== International career ==
Mešanović has represented Bosnia and Herzegovina at under-21 level.

He made one appearance for the Bosnian senior team in a friendly against Poland on 16 December 2011, playing 23 minutes as a substitute in a 1–0 defeat.

== Career statistics ==
=== Club ===
As of match played 9 March 2024

Appearances and goals by club, season and competition
Club	Season	League			National cup		Continental		Total	
Club	Season	Division	Apps	Goals	Apps	Goals	Apps	Goals	Apps	Goals
Sloboda Tuzla	2009–10	Bosnian Premier League	1	0	0	0	—		1	0
Sloboda Tuzla	2010–11	Bosnian Premier League	4	0	2	0	—		6	0
Sloboda Tuzla	2011–12	Bosnian Premier League	25	5	1	0	—		26	5
Sloboda Tuzla	Total		30	5	3	0	0	0	33	5
Čelik	2012–13	Bosnian Premier League	29	10	2	0	—		31	10
Čelik	2013–14	Bosnian Premier League	25	10	6	2	—		31	12
Čelik	Total		54	20	8	2	0	0	62	22
Osijek	2014–15	1. HNL	29	4	0	0	—		29	4
Zrinjski Mostar	2015–16	Bosnian Premier League	29	11	1	0	1 (Note: Appearances in UEFA Europa League)	1	31	12
Zrinjski Mostar	2016–17	Bosnian Premier League	29	11	2	0	2 (Note: Appearances in UEFA Champions League)	0	33	11
Zrinjski Mostar	Total		58	22	3	0	3	1	64	23
Maribor	2017–18	Slovenian PrvaLiga	30	8	3	2	9	1	42	11
Maribor	2018–19	Slovenian PrvaLiga	28	8	5	2	4	0	37	10
Maribor	2019–20	Slovenian PrvaLiga	30	2	1	0	6 (Note: Four appearances in UEFA Champions League, two appearances in UEFA Europa League)	0	37	2
Maribor	2020–21	Slovenian PrvaLiga	17	3	0	0	1	0	18	3
Maribor	Total		105	21	9	4	20	1	134	26
Sarajevo	2020–21	Bosnian Premier League	12	2	4	1	—		16	3
Kisvárda	2021–22	Nemzeti Bajnokság I	32	8	1	0	—		33	8
Kisvárda	2022–23	Nemzeti Bajnokság I	32	8	2	0	4 (Note: Appearances in UEFA Europa Conference League)	1	38	9
Kisvárda	2023–24	Nemzeti Bajnokság I	19	4	0	0	—		19	4
Kisvárda	Total		83	20	3	0	4	1	90	21
Career total			371	94	30	7	27	3	428	104

=== International ===
Appearances and goals by national team and year
National team	Year	Apps	Goals
Bosnia and Herzegovina
Bosnia and Herzegovina	2011	1	0
Total		1	0

== Honours ==
Zrinjski Mostar

- Bosnian Premier League: 2015–16, 2016–17

Maribor

- Slovenian PrvaLiga: 2018–19

Sarajevo

- Bosnian Cup: 2020–21

individual

- Nemzeti Bajnokság I Goal of the Month: September 2023
