= FK Sloga =

FK Sloga may refer to:

- FK Sloga Bar, Montenegrin football club
- FK Sloga Bajina Bašta, Serbian football club
- NK Sloga Bosanska Otoka, Bosnia and Herzegovina football club
- FK Sloga Despotovac, Serbian football club
- FK Sloga Doboj, Bosnia and Herzegovina football club
- FK Sloga Jugomagnat, Macedonian football club, playing in Skopje
- FK Sloga Kraljevo, Serbian football club
- FK Sloga 1976 Lažani, Macedonian football club
- FK Sloga Leskovac, Serbian football club
- NK Sloga Nova Gradiška, Croatian football club
- FK Sloga Petrovac na Mlavi, Serbian football club
- FK Sloga Požega, Serbian football club
- FK Sloga Radnički Erdevik, Serbian football club
- FK Sloga Simin Han, Bosnia and Herzegovina football club
- FK Sloga Sjenica, Serbian football club
- FK Sloga Temerin, Serbian football club
- FK Sloga Trn, Bosnia and Herzegovina football club
- FK Sloga 1934 Vinica, Macedonian football club
