= Mersudin Ahmetović =

Bosnian footballer (born 1985)

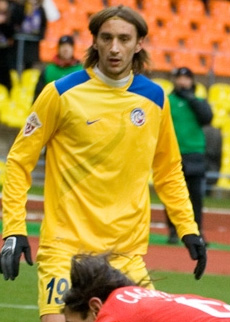
- Ahmetović playing for Rostov in 2009

Personal information
- Date of birth: 19 March 1985 (age 41)
- Place of birth: Tuzla, SFR Yugoslavia
- Height: 1.91 m (6 ft 3 in)
- Position: Striker

Team information
- Current team: Orenburg (assistant)

Youth career
- Radnički Lukavac
- Budućnost Banovići
- –2003: Sloboda Tuzla

Senior career*
Years	Team	Apps	(Gls)
2003–2008	Sloboda Tuzla		
2008–2010	Rostov	68	(17)
2011–2012	Volga Nizhny Novgorod	27	(0)
2013	Salyut Belgorod	29	(4)
2014	Zhetysu	16	(2)
2015–2016	Sloboda Tuzla	40	(13)
2016–2023	Sarajevo	155	(58)
2023–2024	Igman Konjic	40	(2)
Total		375	(96)

International career
2018	Bosnia and Herzegovina	2	(0)

Managerial career
- 2024–2026: Radnik Hadžići (assistant)
- 2026–: Orenburg (assistant)
- * Club domestic league appearances and goals

Mersudin Ahmetović (Bosnian pronunciation: [axměːtoʋitɕ]; born 19 March 1985) is a Bosnian professional football coach and former player who is currently an assistant coach at Russian Premier League club Orenburg.

== Club career ==
=== Early career ===
Ahmetović started his professional football career at hometown club Sloboda Tuzla in 2003. In the summer of 2008 he left Sloboda and joined Russian club Rostov. After two seasons in Rostov and breaking in to the first team spot, he left for Volga Nizhny Novgorod where he had a good start, but got sidelined in his second season with the club. In February 2013, Ahmetović signed a contract with Salyut Belgorod. He left Belgorod in February 2014.

=== Zhetsyu ===
In February 2014, Ahmetović joined Zhetysu, but shortly after, in December 2014, he left the club.

=== Sloboda Tuzla ===
In January 2015, he came back to Bosnia to help Sloboda avoid relegation. In June 2015, Sloboda declared that Ahmetović was to stay for another year in the club. After that year, in 2016 he left Sloboda.

=== Sarajevo ===
After leaving Sloboda in June 2016, Ahmetović went to Sarajevo. Currently, Ahmetović has in 104 league games scored 51 goals for Sarajevo and has been the club's best goalscorer for the past four seasons. On 8 January 2018, he signed a new contract with Sarajevo, which was due to keep him at the club until the summer of 2020. On 3 May 2019, in his 100th appearance for Sarajevo, Ahmetović scored a goal in Sarajevo's 5–0 home league win against Čelik Zenica.

He won his first trophy with the club on 15 May 2019, after Sarajevo beat Široki Brijeg in the final and won the 2018–19 Bosnian Cup. Three days after the cup final, on 18 May 2019, Ahmetović also won the league title with Sarajevo after the club beat Zvijezda 09 4–0 at home. On 23 May 2019, he was named the Bosnian Premier League Player of the Season. On 2 November 2019, Sarajevo beat Široki Brijeg at home 3–0 in a league game, with Ahmetović scoring all the goals, securing himself a hat-trick. Ahmetović once again extended his contract with Sarajevo on 12 November 2019, signing a two-year contract extension until 2021. He scored a goal in his team's 3–1, home league Sarajevo derby defeat against Željezničar on 30 November 2019. Ahmetović scored another hat-trick, this time in a 6–2 league win against Tuzla City on 22 February 2020.

He won his second league title with Sarajevo and became the league top goalscorer on 1 June 2020, though after the 2019–20 Bosnian Premier League season was ended abruptly due to the COVID-19 pandemic in Bosnia and Herzegovina and after which Sarajevo were by default crowned league champions for a second consecutive time.

On 19 July 2020, the club revealed that Ahmetović fractured his ribs in a pre-season game against his former club Sloboda four days earlier. He scored his first goal for Sarajevo in the 2020–21 season in a league win against Tuzla City on 12 August 2020.

In October 2020, Ahmetović injured his cruciate ligament, forcing him out of action until the end of the season.

=== Igman Konjic ===
On 22 January 2023, Ahmetović left Sarajevo and joined relegation threatened Igman Konjic on a free transfer. He debuted and scored his first goal for the club in a league game against Željezničar on 25 February 2023.

On 3 July 2024, Ahmetović announced his retirement from professional football.

== International career ==
Ahmetović made his international debut for Bosnia and Herzegovina in a friendly 0–0 tie with the USA on 28 January 2018. His second appearance came against Mexico in also a friendly 1–0 loss on 1 February 2018. In both games Ahmetović was a starter.

== Personal life ==
Ahmetović's look bears a strong resemblance to that of famous Swedish forward Zlatan Ibrahimović who is also of Bosnian descent himself, they also share a similar style of play.

== Career statistics ==
=== Club ===
Appearances and goals by club, season and competition
Club	Season	League	League		Cup		Continental		Total	
Club	Season	League	Apps	Goals	Apps	Goals	Apps	Goals	Apps	Goals
Rostov	2008	Russian Football National League	12	7	0	0	–		12	7
Rostov	2009	Russian Premier League	28	6	1	0	–		29	6
Rostov	2010	Russian Premier League	28	4	2	0	–		30	4
Rostov	Total		68	17	3	0	–		71	17
Volga Nizhny Novgorod	2011–12	Russian Premier League	21	0	1	0	–		22	0
Volga Nizhny Novgorod	2012–13	Russian Premier League	6	0	0	0	–		6	0
Volga Nizhny Novgorod	Total		27	0	1	0	–		28	0
Salyut Belgorod	2012–13	Russian National Football League	12	2	0	0	–		12	2
Salyut Belgorod	2013–14	Russian National Football League	17	2	0	0	–		17	2
Salyut Belgorod	Total		29	4	0	0	–		29	4
Zhetysu	2014	Kazakhstan Premier League	16	2	0	0	–		16	2
Sloboda Tuzla	2014–15	Bosnian Premier League	11	3	0	0	–		11	3
Sloboda Tuzla	2015–16	Bosnian Premier League	29	10	9	3	–		38	13
Sloboda Tuzla	Total		40	13	9	3	–		49	16
Sarajevo	2016–17	Bosnian Premier League	30	10	8	2	–		38	12
Sarajevo	2017–18	Bosnian Premier League	24	14	1	0	1	0	26	14
Sarajevo	2018–19	Bosnian Premier League	29	14	6	0	4	2	39	16
Sarajevo	2019–20	Bosnian Premier League	21	13	0	0	3	0	24	13
Sarajevo	2020–21	Bosnian Premier League	10	3	1	0	4	0	15	3
Sarajevo	2021–22	Bosnian Premier League	25	2	4	1	0	0	29	3
Sarajevo	2022–23	Bosnian Premier League	16	2	1	0	–		17	2
Sarajevo	Total		155	58	21	3	12	2	188	63
Igman Konjic	2022–23	Bosnian Premier League	12	1	–		–		12	1
Igman Konjic	2023–24	Bosnian Premier League	28	1	1	0	–		29	1
Igman Konjic	Total		40	2	1	0	–		41	2
Career total			375	96	35	6	12	2	422	104

=== International ===
Appearances and goals by club, season and competition
National team	Year	Apps	Goals
Bosnia and Herzegovina	2018	2	0
Total		2	0

== Honours ==
Sarajevo

- Bosnian Premier League: 2018–19, 2019–20
- Bosnian Cup: 2018–19, 2020–21

Individual

- Bosnian Premier League Player of the Season: 2018–19
- Bosnian Premier League top scorer: 2019–20
