= Aleksandar Pejović =

Serbian footballer (born 1990)

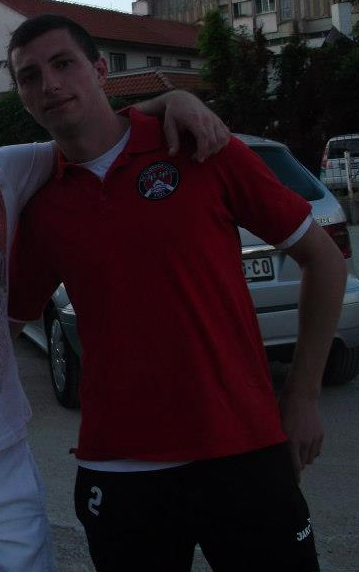
- Pejović in 2013

Personal information
- Full name: Aleksandar Pejović
- Date of birth: 28 December 1990 (age 35)
- Place of birth: Užička Požega, SFR Yugoslavia
- Height: 1.74 m (5 ft 9 in)
- Position: Midfielder

Team information
- Current team: Radnik Surdulica
- Number: 28

Senior career*
Years	Team	Apps	(Gls)
2006–2007	Sloga Požega	15	(0)
2007–2008	Radnički Kragujevac	16	(2)
2008–2010	Sevojno	21	(0)
2010–2014	Sloboda Užice	88	(3)
2014–2015	Trélissac	21	(1)
2015–2016	OFK Beograd	29	(3)
2016–2019	Mladost Lučani	97	(20)
2019	Dinamo Minsk	9	(1)
2020	Radnički Niš	13	(1)
2020–2021	Sarajevo	23	(0)
2021–2023	Radnički Niš	83	(7)
2024–2025	Mladost Lučani	50	(10)
2025–	Radnik Surdulica	29	(2)
- * Club domestic league appearances and goals as of 12 June 2026

Aleksandar Pejović (Serbian Cyrillic: Александар Пејовић; born 28 December 1990) is a Serbian professional footballer who plays as a midfielder for Radnik Surdulica.

== Career ==
Pejović started out his career with hometown club Sloga Požega, making his first-team debut in the 2006–07 season. He then spent one year at fellow Serbian League West side Radnički Kragujevac (2007–08), before joining Serbian First League club Sevojno. In the summer of 2010, Sevojno merged with Sloboda Užice and started competing in the Serbian SuperLiga. Over the next four seasons, Pejović made 88 appearances and scored three goals in the top flight.

In the summer of 2014, he moved abroad to France and joined CFA side Trélissac. He later returned to Serbia and played for OFK Beograd in the 2015–16 season. In June 2016, Pejović signed with Mladost Lučani. After three years at Mladost, he played for Belarusian side Dinamo Minsk, before returning to Serbia and joining Radnički Niš.

On 13 August 2020, Pejović signed a two-year contract with Bosnian Premier League club Sarajevo. He made his official debut for the club in a league match against Radnik Bijeljina on 31 August 2020. Pejović won his first trophy with Sarajevo on 26 May 2021, after beating Borac Banja Luka in the 2020–21 Bosnian Cup final. He left the club the day after the cup final, on 27 May.

On 16 June 2021, he returned to Radnički Niš.

== Career statistics ==
As of match played 11 May 2021

Appearances and goals by club, season and competition
Club	Season	League			Cup		Continental		Total	
Club	Season	Division	Apps	Goals	Apps	Goals	Apps	Goals	Apps	Goals
Sloga Požega	2006–07	Serbian League West	15	0	—		—		15	0
Radnički Kragujevac	2007–08	Serbian League West	16	2	—		—		16	2
Sevojno	2008–09	Serbian First League	5	0	—		—		5	0
Sevojno	2009–10	Serbian First League	16	0	—		1	0	17	0
Sevojno	Total		21	0	0	0	1	0	22	0
Sloboda Užice	2010–11	Serbian SuperLiga	12	1	3	0	—		15	1
Sloboda Užice	2011–12	Serbian SuperLiga	27	0	1	0	—		28	0
Sloboda Užice	2012–13	Serbian SuperLiga	25	0	1	0	—		26	0
Sloboda Užice	2013–14	Serbian SuperLiga	24	2	3	1	—		27	3
Sloboda Užice	Total		88	3	8	1	—		96	4
Trélissac	2014–15	Championnat National 2	21	1	0	0	—		21	1
OFK Beograd	2015–16	Serbian SuperLiga	29	3	3	1	—		32	4
Mladost Lučani	2016–17	Serbian SuperLiga	32	0	2	0	—		34	0
Mladost Lučani	2017–18	Serbian SuperLiga	33	7	4	1	2	0	39	8
Mladost Lučani	2018–19	Serbian SuperLiga	32	13	4	1	—		36	14
Mladost Lučani	Total		97	20	10	2	2	0	109	22
Dinamo Minsk	2019	Belarusian Premier League	9	1	1	0	0	0	10	1
Radnički Niš	2019–20	Serbian SuperLiga	10	0	1	0	0	0	11	0
Radnički Niš	2020–21	Serbian SuperLiga	3	1	—		—		3	1
Radnički Niš	Total		13	1	1	0	0	0	14	1
Sarajevo	2020–21	Bosnian Premier League	23	0	5	0	2	0	30	0
Career total			332	31	28	4	5	0	365	35

== Honours ==
Sarajevo

- Bosnian Cup: 2020–21

Individual

- Serbian SuperLiga Player of the Week: 2022–23 (Round 35)
