= Zinedin Mustedanagić =

Bosnian footballer

Personal information
- Date of birth: 1 August 1998 (age 28)
- Place of birth: Bosanska Krupa, Bosnia and Herzegovina
- Height: 1.85 m (6 ft 1 in)
- Position: Midfielder

Team information
- Current team: BSK Bijelo Brdo
- Number: 4

Youth career
- Sloga Bosanska Otoka
- –2011: Sloboda Bubamara Novi Grad
- 2011–2016: Sparta Prague

Senior career*
Years	Team	Apps	(Gls)
2016–2020	Sparta Prague	7	(0)
2017	→ Dukla Prague (loan)	18	(3)
2018–2019	→ Ružomberok (loan)	25	(5)
2019	→ České Budějovice (loan)	5	(0)
2020	→ Sarajevo (loan)	2	(0)
2020–2021	Sarajevo	13	(2)
2021–2022	Vllaznia Shkodër	25	(2)
2022–2024	Vukovar 1991	56	(22)
2024–	BSK Bijelo Brdo	0	(0)

International career
2012–2015	Bosnia and Herzegovina U17	16	(4)
2015–2017	Bosnia and Herzegovina U19	19	(5)
2017–2020	Bosnia and Herzegovina U21	11	(2)
- * Club domestic league appearances and goals as of 10 July 2024

Zinedin Mustedanagić (Bosnian pronunciation: [zǐnedin mǔstedanagitɕ]; born 1 August 1998) is a Bosnian professional footballer who plays as a midfielder for Prva NL club BSK Bijelo Brdo.

== Club career ==
=== Sparta Prague ===
Mustedanagić started playing football at his local club Sloga Bosanska Otoka before moving very early to the Bubamara academy in Novi Grad, connected to Sloboda Novi Grad. In 2011 he moved abroad to Sparta Prague's youth academy, with whom he signed his first professional contract in August 2015. He made his professional debut in a cup game against České Budějovice on 12 October 2016 at the age of 18. Two weeks later, he made his league debut in a 4–0 home win against Příbram.

On 25 January 2017, Mustedanagić signed a new three-year deal with the club.

Two days later, he was sent on a year-long loan to Dukla Prague. During the loan, on 11 March, he scored his first professional goal against Jablonec, which ensured his team a triumph.

In August 2018, Mustedanagić was loaned to Slovak Fortuna liga club Ružomberok. It was said, that he re-joined David Holoubek, who previously served as a youth manager in Sparta, to advance Mustedanagić in his career, as well as to increase his play-time due to an overload of players in Sparta's senior team.

In Slovakia, Mustedanagić immediately became a starting-XI player and a crucial part of the team, playing in his preferred position, as an attacking midfielder. In his debut match against Spartak Trnava, that concluded as a goal-less tie, on 26 August 2018, Mustedanagić played the entire match and was booked with a yellow card. He scored his first header goal against Nitra over a month later, after a cross from Peter Gál-Andrezly. By the end of the season he scored 4 more league goals (plus 2 more in the Slovak Cup against FK Gerlachov), including one against Slovan Bratislava, in an unexpected 3–2 win over the season's champions.

This marked the first competitive defeat for Slovan at the newly reconstructed Tehelné pole and meant, that after 16 rounds Ružomberok re-gained the 3rd place in the table overcoming Žilina, to the place guaranteeing them a spot in the qualifying round of next season's Europa League. Ružomberok managed to hold on to that position in the remaining three fixtures of the season.

During the second part of 2019, Mustedanagić was loaned to Czech First League club České Budějovice.

=== Sarajevo ===
In January 2020, Mustedanagić was sent on a loan to Bosnian Premier League Sarajevo. He made his official debut for Sarajevo in a 6–2 league win against Tuzla City on 22 February 2020. On 1 June 2020, Mustedanagić won his first league title with Sarajevo, though after the 2019–20 Bosnian Premier League season was ended abruptly due to the COVID-19 pandemic in Bosnia and Herzegovina and after which Sarajevo were by default crowned league champions for a second consecutive time.

On 17 July 2020, he permanently joined Sarajevo after the club bought out his contract with Sparta, signing a three-year contract. Mustedanagić scored his first goal for the club on 30 October 2020, in a league match against Mladost Doboj Kakanj.

In June 2021, he terminated his contract with Sarajevo, leaving the club.

== International career ==
Mustedanagić represented Bosnia and Herzegovina on all youth levels. He also served as captain of the under-17 and under-19 teams.

== Personal life ==
Zinedin is a cousin of former Yugoslav international player Džemal Mustedanagić.

== Career statistics ==
=== Club ===
As of match played 1 June 2024

Club	Season	League			National cup (Note: Includes Czech Cup, Slovak Cup, Bosnia and Herzegovina Cup, Albanian Cup, Croatian Cup)		Continental		Total	
Club	Season	Division	Apps	Goals	Apps	Goals	Apps	Goals	Apps	Goals
Sparta Prague	2016–17	Czech First League	5	0	2	0	—		7	0
Sparta Prague	2017–18	Czech First League	2	0	—		—		2	0
Sparta Prague	Total		7	0	2	0	—		9	0
Dukla Prague (loan)	2016–17	Czech First League	9	1	—		—		9	1
Dukla Prague (loan)	2017–18	Czech First League	9	2	2	0	—		11	2
Dukla Prague (loan)	Total		18	3	2	0	—		20	3
Ružomberok (loan)	2018–19	Slovak Super Liga	25	5	2	2	—		27	7
České Budějovice (loan)	2019–20	Czech First League	5	0	2	0	—		7	0
Sarajevo (loan)	2019–20	Bosnian Premier League	2	0	—		—		2	0
Sarajevo	2020–21	Bosnian Premier League	13	2	3	0	0	0	16	2
Sarajevo	Total		15	2	3	0	0	0	18	2
Vllaznia Shkodër	2021–22	Kategoria Superiore	25	2	7	6	—		32	8
Vukovar 1991	2022–23	Prva NL	29	11	—		—		29	11
Vukovar 1991	2023–24	Prva NL	27	11	3	1	—		30	12
Vukovar 1991	Total		56	22	3	1	—		59	23
Career total			151	34	21	9	0	0	172	43

== Honours ==
Sarajevo

- Bosnian Premier League: 2019–20
- Bosnian Cup: 2020–21
