= Hamza Bešić =

Bosnian footballer

Personal information
- Full name: Hamza Bešić
- Date of birth: 27 September 2000 (age 26)
- Place of birth: Sarajevo, Bosnia and Herzegovina
- Height: 1.87 m (6 ft 2 in)
- Position: Centre-back

Team information
- Current team: Stupčanica Olovo
- Number: 4

Youth career
- 2014–2019: Sarajevo

Senior career*
Years	Team	Apps	(Gls)
2019–2023	Sarajevo	2	(0)
2020	→ Olimpik (loan)	0	(0)
2021–2022	→ Vis Simm-Bau (loan)	12	(0)
2022	→ Goražde (loan)	13	(0)
2022–2023	→ Stupčanica Olovo (loan)	25	(0)
2023–	Stupčanica Olovo	3	(0)
- * Club domestic league appearances and goals as of 3 September 2023

Hamza Bešić (born 27 September 2000) is a Bosnian professional footballer who plays as a centre-back for First League of FBiH club Stupčanica Olovo. Previously he played for Sarajevo and was loaned to Olimpik, Vis Simm-Bau and Goražde.

== Honours ==
Sarajevo

- Bosnian Cup: 2020–21
