= Đani Salčin =

Bosnian footballer

Personal information
- Date of birth: 19 March 2000 (age 26)
- Place of birth: Mostar, Bosnia and Herzegovina
- Height: 1.80 m (5 ft 11 in)
- Position: Midfielder

Team information
- Current team: Velež Mostar
- Number: 22

Youth career
- 2014–2019: Sarajevo

Senior career*
Years	Team	Apps	(Gls)
2019–2023	Sarajevo	23	(0)
2021–2022	→ Velež Mostar (loan)	23	(1)
2024–2025	Rudar Prijedor	31	(5)
2025	GOŠK Gabela	27	(6)
2026–	Velež Mostar	21	(3)

International career
2016–2017	Bosnia and Herzegovina U17	11	(0)
2018	Bosnia and Herzegovina U19	7	(0)
2020–2021	Bosnia and Herzegovina U21	6	(0)
- * Club domestic league appearances and goals as of 19 September 2026

Đani Salčin (born 19 March 2000) is a Bosnian professional footballer who plays for Bosnian Premier League club Velež Mostar. He also played for the Bosnia and Herzegovina U21 national team.

== Career statistics ==
=== Club ===
As of match played 19 September 2026

Appearances and goals by club, season and competition
Club	Season	League			Bosnian Cup		Continental		Total	
Club	Season	League	Apps	Goals	Apps	Goals	Apps	Goals	Apps	Goals
Sarajevo	2018–19	Bosnian Premier League	1	0	1	0	0	0	2	0
Sarajevo	2019–20	Bosnian Premier League	3	0	1	1	0	0	4	1
Sarajevo	2020–21	Bosnian Premier League	10	0	0	0	2 (Note: Appearances in UEFA Champions League)	0	12	0
Sarajevo	2021–22	Bosnian Premier League	2	0	0	0	2 (Note: Appearances in UEFA Europa Conference League)	0	4	0
Sarajevo	2022–23	Bosnian Premier League	7	0	0	0	—		7	0
Sarajevo	Total		23	0	2	1	4	0	29	1
Velež Mostar (loan)	2021–22	Bosnian Premier League	23	1	5	1	—		28	2
Rudar Prijedor	2023–24	First League of RS	15	3	—		—		15	3
Rudar Prijedor	2024–25	First League of RS	16	2	—		—		16	2
Rudar Prijedor	Total		31	5	—		—		31	5
GOŠK Gabela	2024–25	Bosnian Premier League	15	1	1	0	—		16	1
GOŠK Gabela	2025–26	First League of FBiH	12	5	1	3	—		13	8
GOŠK Gabela	Total		27	6	2	3	—		29	9
Velež Mostar	2025–26	Bosnian Premier League	15	3	6	0	—		21	3
Velež Mostar	2026–27	Bosnian Premier League	6	0	0	0	3	0	9	0
Velež Mostar	Total		21	3	6	0	3	0	30	3
Career total			125	15	15	5	7	0	147	20

== Honours ==
Sarajevo

- Bosnian Premier League: 2018–19, 2019–20
- Bosnian Cup: 2018–19, 2020–21

Velež Mostar

- Bosnian Cup: 2021–22
