= Danac Stadium =

Association football stadium, Bosnia and Herzegovina

- Stadion "Danac"
- Interactive map of Danac Stadium
- Full name: Danac Stadium
- Address: Olovo; Bosnia and Herzegovina
- Location: Olovo, Bosnia and Herzegovina
- Coordinates: 44.12945001769098°N 18.587310704271218°E
- Owner: NK Stupčanica
- Operator: NK Stupčanica
- Capacity: 1,500
- Surface: grass

Construction
- Renovated: 2023
- Expanded: 2023

Tenant
- NK Stupčanica

Website
- https://www.nkstupcanica.ba/

Danac Stadium (Bosnian: Stadion Danac) is a multi-purpose stadium in Olovo, Bosnia and Herzegovina. It is the home stadium of First League of FBiH club NK Stupčanica from Olovo. The stadium has a capacity to hold 1,500 spectators.

== See also ==
- City Stadium Konjic
