= Dženan Zaimović =

Bosnian football manager (born 1973)

Personal information
- Date of birth: 25 September 1973 (age 53)
- Place of birth: Mostar, SFR Yugoslavia
- Height: 1.91 m (6 ft 3 in)
- Position: Centre-back

Youth career
- –1998: Velež Mostar

Senior career*
Years	Team	Apps	(Gls)
1998–2000	Velež Mostar		
2000–2002	Fortuna Düsseldorf	18	(2)
2002–2011	Velež Mostar	102	(13)

International career
2000	Bosnia and Herzegovina	2	(0)

Managerial career
- 2015: Velež Mostar (caretaker)
- 2015: Velež Mostar (caretaker)
- 2016: Turbina Jablanica
- 2020–2022: TOŠK Tešanj
- 2022–2024: Stupčanica
- 2024–2025: Čelik Zenica
- 2025: Velež Nevesinje
- 2026: Stupčanica
- * Club domestic league appearances and goals

Dženan Zaimović (born 25 September 1973) is a Bosnian professional football manager and former player.

== International career ==
Zaimović made his debut for Bosnia and Herzegovina in a March 2000 friendly game away against Jordan. His second and final international was also against Jordan, four days later.

== Honours ==
=== Player ===
Velež Mostar

- First League of FBiH: 2005–06
