= Faruk Hodžić =

Bosnian footballer

Personal information
- Full name: Faruk Hodžić
- Date of birth: 4 August 2003 (age 23)
- Place of birth: Sarajevo, Bosnia and Herzegovina
- Height: 1.79 m (5 ft 10 1/2 in)
- Position: Defensive midfielder

Team information
- Current team: Stupčanica Olovo

Youth career
- 2015–2020: Sarajevo

Senior career*
Years	Team	Apps	(Gls)
2020–2022	Sarajevo	1	(0)
2022–2023	Fehérvár II	0	(0)
2023–	Stupčanica Olovo	12	(0)

International career
2019	Bosnia and Herzegovina U17	3	(0)
- * Club domestic league appearances and goals as of 19 November 2023

Faruk Hodžić (born 4 August 2003) is a Bosnian professional footballer who plays as a defensive midfielder for First League of the FBiH club Stupčanica Olovo. He started his career in FK Sarajevo Academy and signed his first professional contract for Sarajevo in July 2020.
