= 2019–20 First League of the Federation of Bosnia and Herzegovina =

First League of the Federation of Bosnia and Herzegovina
- Season: 2019–20
- Dates: 10 August 2019 – 26 May 2020
- Champions: Olimpik
- Promoted: Olimpik
- Relegated: Metalleghe-BSI (stepped out)
- Matches: 128
- Goals: 366 (2.86 per match)
- Top goalscorer: Anes Mašić; Antonio Vidović (10 goals)
- Biggest home win: 5–0 on several occasions
- Biggest away win: Orašje 1–5 Čapljina (14 September 2019)
- Highest scoring: Rudar Kakanj 5–2 Bratstvo Gračanica (13 October 2019); Rudar Kakanj 3–4 GOŠK Gabela (9 November 2019)
- Longest winning run: Olimpik; TOŠK Tešanj (4 matches)
- Longest unbeaten run: 11 matches Olimpik
- Longest winless run: 7 matches Radnik Hadžići
- Longest losing run: Radnik Hadžići; Jedinstvo Bihać (5 matches)

The 2019–20 First League of the Federation of Bosnia and Herzegovina was the twentieth season of the First League of the Federation of Bosnia and Herzegovina, the second tier football league of Bosnia and Herzegovina. The season began on 10 August 2019 and ended abruptly on 26 May 2020 due to the COVID-19 pandemic in Bosnia and Herzegovina.

Olimpik were crowned champions, winning their second championship title and earning promotion to the Premier League of Bosnia and Herzegovina.

== Teams ==
Team	Location	Stadium	Capacity
Bratstvo	Gračanica	Gradski Stadion Luke, Gračanica	3,000
Budućnost	Banovići	Stadion FK Budućnost	8,500
Čapljina	Čapljina	Bjelave Stadium	3,000
Goražde	Goražde	Midhat Drljević Stadium	1,500
GOŠK	Gabela	Perica-Pero Pavlović Stadium	3,000
Igman	Konjic	Gradski Stadion, Konjic	5,000
Jedinstvo	Bihać	Pod Borićima Stadium	7,500
Metalleghe-BSI	Jajce	Mračaj Stadium	3,000
Olimpik	Sarajevo	Otoka Stadium	3,000
Orašje	Orašje	Gradski Stadion, Orašje	3,000
Radnik	Hadžići	Gradski Stadion, Hadžići	500
Rudar	Kakanj	FK Rudar Stadium	4,568
Slaven	Živinice	Gradski Stadion, Živinice	500
TOŠK	Tešanj	Luke Stadium, Tešanj	7,000
Travnik	Travnik	Pirota Stadium	4,000
Zvijezda	Gradačac	Banja Ilidža	5,000

== League table ==
Pos	Team	Pld	W	D	L	GF	GA	GD	Pts	Promotion or relegation
1	Olimpik (C, P)	16	11	4	1	28	13	+15	37	Promotion to the Premijer Liga BiH
2	TOŠK Tešanj	16	10	1	5	27	21	+6	31	
3	Goražde	16	8	4	4	27	15	+12	28	
4	GOŠK Gabela	16	8	4	4	30	25	+5	28	
5	Čapljina	16	7	3	6	19	15	+4	24	
6	Rudar Kakanj	16	7	2	7	26	21	+5	23	
7	Travnik	16	7	2	7	23	21	+2	23	
8	Igman	16	7	2	7	17	18	−1	23	
9	Zvijezda Gradačac	16	6	4	6	23	26	−3	22	
10	Metalleghe-BSI (Note: On 1 July 2020, Metalleghe-BSI stepped out of the First League of FBiH because of financial difficulties.) (R, D)	16	5	6	5	23	26	−3	21	Excluded from Bosnian professional football, relegated to the First League of Central Bosnia Canton
11	Budućnost	16	5	5	6	26	22	+4	20	
12	Bratstvo Gračanica	16	6	2	8	24	29	−5	20	
13	Orašje	16	5	3	8	24	32	−8	18	
14	Jedinstvo Bihać	16	5	2	9	20	30	−10	17	
15	Slaven Živinice (Note: Slaven avoided relegation to the Second League of FBiH because of Metalleghe's stepping out.)	16	4	1	11	15	24	−9	13	
16	Radnik Hadžići (Note: Radnik avoided relegation because of Čelik Zenica's exclusion to the League of Zenica-Doboj Canton on 13 July 2020.)	16	4	1	11	17	31	−14	13	

Source: NS FBiH
Rules for classification: 1) Points; 2) Head-to-head points; 3) Head-to-head goal difference; 4) Head-to-head goals scored; 5) Head-to-head away goals scored (only if two teams); 6) Goal difference; 7) Goals scored; 8) Play-off.
(C) Champions; (D) Disqualified; (P) Promoted; (R) Relegated

== See also ==
- 2019–20 Premier League of Bosnia and Herzegovina
- 2019–20 First League of the Republika Srpska
- 2019–20 Bosnia and Herzegovina Football Cup
