= Matthias Fanimo =

English footballer

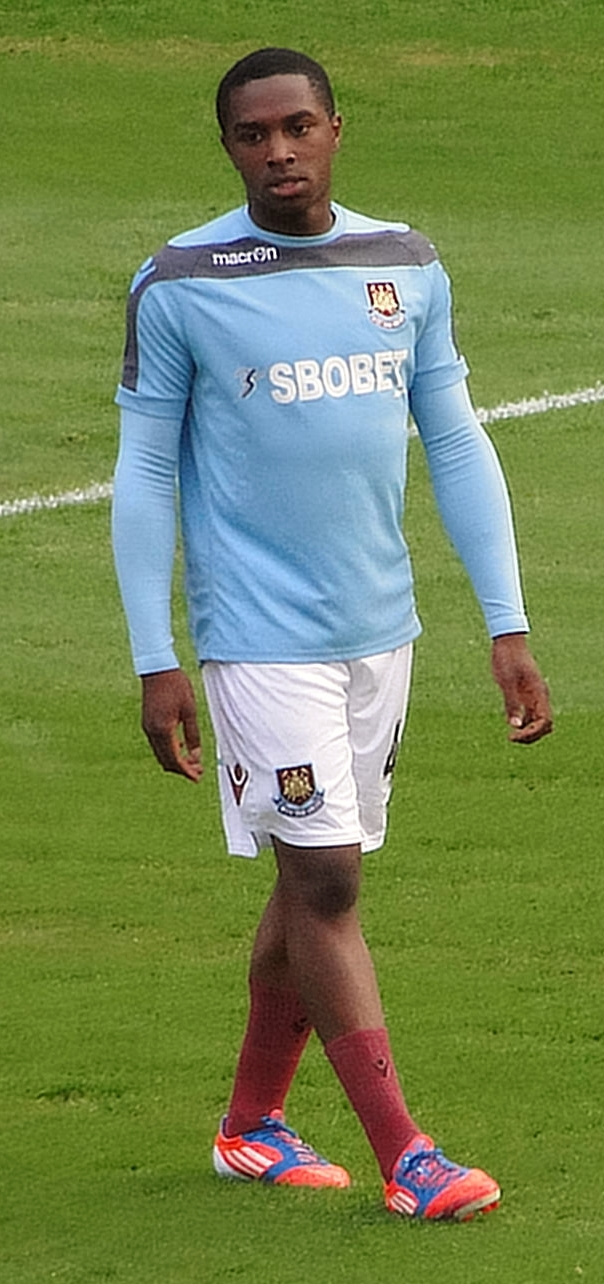
- Fanimo warming up for West Ham United in August 2012

Personal information
- Full name: Matthias Olubori Ayodluwa Fanimo
- Date of birth: 28 January 1994 (age 32)
- Place of birth: Lambeth, England
- Height: 1.73 m (5 ft 8 in)
- Position: Right winger

Team information
- Current team: Stanway Rovers

Youth career
- 2001–2011: West Ham United

Senior career*
Years	Team	Apps	(Gls)
2011–2015	West Ham United	0	(0)
2014	→ Tranmere Rovers (loan)	1	(0)
2015	Bishop's Stortford	9	(0)
2015–2016	Eastleigh	8	(0)
2016–2017	Margate	9	(1)
2017–2018	AFC Hornchurch	12	(1)
2018–2019	Drava Ptuj	29	(19)
2019–2020	Mladost Doboj Kakanj	29	(6)
2020–2022	Sarajevo	36	(10)
2022	Slaven Belupo	9	(0)
2022–2023	Koper	8	(0)
2023–2024	Ebbsfleet United	8	(0)
2024–2025	Folkestone Invicta	31	(3)
2025–2026	Cheshunt	39	(5)
2026–	Stanway Rovers	12	(3)

International career
2008–2010	England U16	8	(2)
2010	England U17	9	(1)
2011	England U18	1	(0)
- * Club domestic league appearances and goals as of 09:50, 11 February 2026 (UTC)

Matthias Olubori Ayodluwa Fanimo (born 28 January 1994) is an English footballer who plays as a right winger for Stanway Rovers.

== Club career ==
=== West Ham United ===
A youth team player, Fanimo signed his first professional contract with West Ham United in the summer of 2011. He made his first team debut for West Ham on 28 August 2012 against Crewe Alexandra in the Football League Cup coming on as a 60th-minute substitute for Matthew Taylor. West Ham won the match 2–0.

Fanimo was released by West Ham on 2 February 2015.

=== Tranmere Rovers ===
In September 2014, Fanimo signed on loan for Tranmere Rovers. He made only one appearance for Tranmere, coming on as an 80th-minute substitute for Jake Kirby in a 1–0 away defeat by Carlisle United on 27 September 2014.

=== Margate ===
On 27 June 2016, Fanimo signed with Margate.

=== Drava Ptuj ===
On 16 January 2018, Fanimo signed with Slovenian Second League club Drava Ptuj.

=== Mladost Doboj Kakanj ===
On 16 January 2019, Fanimo left Drava and signed a two-and-a-half-year contract with Bosnian Premier League club Mladost Doboj Kakanj.

He made his official debut for Mladost on 23 February 2019 in a 1–0 win over GOŠK Gabela. Fanimo scored his first goal for Mladost on 20 April 2019, in a 3–1 home win against GOŠK Gabela.

=== Sarajevo ===
On 24 July 2020, Fanimo signed a three-year contract with Sarajevo for an alleged transfer fee of €50,000. He made his official debut for the club in a league match against Krupa on 2 August 2020. Fanimo scored his first goal for Sarajevo on 20 September 2020, against Sloboda Tuzla. He won his first trophy with the club on 26 May 2021, after beating Borac Banja Luka in the 2020–21 Bosnian Cup final.

In February 2022, Sarajevo terminated its contract with Fanimo due to his alleged indiscipline.

=== Slaven Belupo ===
In June 2022, Fanimo joined Croatian Football League club Slaven Belupo on a free transfer. He made nine league appearances for the team in the first part of the 2022–23 season, before leaving the club in December 2022 following the termination of his contract by mutual consent.

=== Koper ===
On 14 December 2022, Fanimo returned to Slovenia and signed a contract with Slovenian top division side Koper until June 2024.

=== Return to England ===
On 29 June 2023, Fanimo returned to England to join newly-promoted National League side Ebbsfleet United. He was released by the club at the end of the 2023–24 season.

On 24 September 2024, Fanimo signed for Isthmian League Premier Division side Folkestone Invicta and made his debut the same night in the Kent Senior Cup. He departed the club upon the expiration of his contract at the end of the 2024–25 season.

In August 2025, Fanimo joined fellow Isthmian League side Cheshunt.

Ahead of the 2026–27 season, Fanimo signed for newly promoted Isthmian Premier Division side Stanway Rovers.

== International career ==
Fanimo has played for England at under-16, under-17, and the under-18 level. He made his debut for the under-16 side on 28 November 2008 against Scotland U16 in the 2008 Victory Shield which England won 2–0 and in doing so, winning the shield. Fanimo was then given the captain's armband for the 2009 Victory Shield by Kenny Swain and he then scored his first goal at U16 level against Northern Ireland on 5 November 2009 in the 82nd minute as England went on to win 2–0.

Fanimo then made his debut at under-17 level on 3 August 2010 against Finland, and his under-18 debut in November 2011 against Slovakia.

== Honours ==
Sarajevo

- Bosnian Cup: 2020–21
