= Faruk Dedić =

Bosnian football manager (born 1971)

Personal information
- Date of birth: 14 November 1971 (age 54)
- Place of birth: Sarajevo, SFR Yugoslavia

Managerial career
- Years: Team
- 2015–2017: Bosna Visoko
- 2019–2020: Bosna Visoko
- 2020–2022: Stupčanica
- 2024–2025: Stupčanica

Faruk Dedić (born 14 November 1971) is a Bosnian professional football manager who was most recently manager of First League of FBiH club Stupčanica.

== Managerial statistics ==
As of match played 13 April 2025

Managerial record by team and tenure
| Team | From | To | Record | | | | |
| Team | From | To | G | W | D | L | Win % |
|---|---|---|---|---|---|---|---|
| Bosna Visoko | 1 July 2015 | 4 April 2017 | 48 | 25 | 5 | 18 | 52.08 |
| Bosna Visoko | 3 July 2019 | 30 September 2020 | 23 | 12 | 4 | 7 | 52.17 |
| Stupčanica | 15 October 2020 | 9 November 2022 | 64 | 42 | 7 | 15 | 65.63 |
| Stupčanica | 26 June 2024 | 13 April 2025 | 22 | 13 | 5 | 4 | 59.09 |
| Total | | | 157 | 92 | 21 | 44 | 58.60 |

== Honours ==
Stupčanica

- Second League of FBiH: 2021–22 (Center)
