= Dejan Uzelac =

Serbian footballer

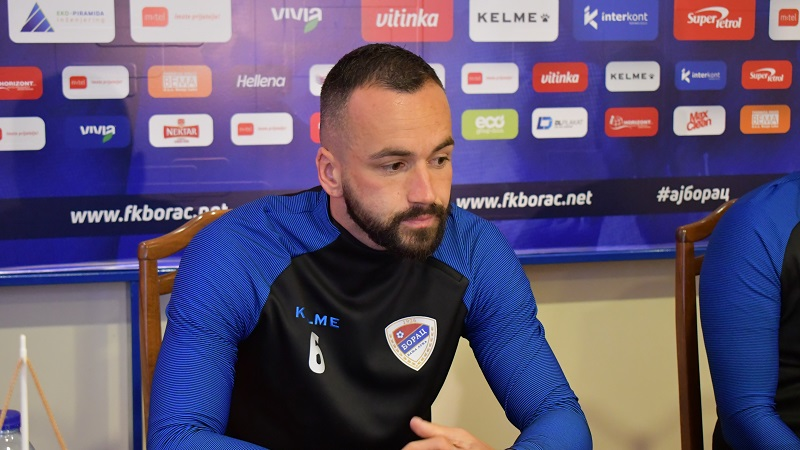

Personal information
- Date of birth: 27 August 1993 (age 33)
- Place of birth: Zrenjanin, FR Yugoslavia
- Height: 1.90 m (6 ft 3 in)
- Position: Centre-back

Team information
- Current team: Thrissur Magic

Youth career
- –2010: Banat Zrenjanin

Senior career*
Years	Team	Apps	(Gls)
2010–2013	Banat Zrenjanin	3	(0)
2011–2012	→ Zadrugar Lazarevo (loan)	3	(0)
2013–2014	Proleter Novi Sad	3	(0)
2014	Drina Zvornik	7	(0)
2015	Željezničar	5	(0)
2016	Olimpik	7	(1)
2016–2017	Metalac Gornji Milanovac	3	(0)
2017	Olimpik	2	(1)
2018–2019	Olimpik	21	(2)
2019–2020	Sloboda Tuzla	22	(1)
2021	Borac Banja Luka	14	(2)
2022	Kolubara	5	(0)
2022–2023	Leotar	15	(2)
2023–2024	Makedonikos	1	(0)
2024	SCM Zalău	4	(0)
2025–	Thrissur Magic		
- * Club domestic league appearances and goals

Dejan Uzelac (Serbian Cyrillic: Дејан Узелац; born 27 August 1993) is a Serbian professional footballer who plays as a centre-back for the Super League Kerala club Thrissur Magic.

== Career ==
Born in Zrenjanin, Uzelac started his career with local club Banat, where he made his senior debut in last fixture of the 2010–11 Serbian First League season, against Mladi Radnik.

He was also loaned to Zadrugar Lazarevo for the 2011–12 Serbian League Vojvodina season. Returning to his home club, Uzelac was also used two times for the 2012–13 season. After he spent a season with Proleter Novi Sad, Uzelac joined Bosnian Premier League side Drina Zvornik in the summer of 2014.

At the beginning of February 2015, he signed a two-year contract with Željezničar, but a year later he moved to other club from the same city, Olimpik. In the summer of 2016, Uzelac joined Metalac Gornji Milanovac. At the beginning of 2017, he returned to Olimpik. He left Olimpik in June 2017.

In January 2018, Uzelac again came back to Olimpik. On 15 July 2019, he signed with Sloboda Tuzla. Uzelac made his debut for Sloboda on 21 July 2019, in a 2–1 home league win against Radnik Bijeljina. He scored his first goal for Sloboda in a 2–1 away league loss against Borac Banja Luka on 8 December 2019.

On 20 January 2021, Uzelac signed a one-and-a-half-year contract with Borac Banja Luka. He debuted in a league game against Velež Mostar on 5 March 2021. Uzelac scored his first goal for Borac in a league game against his former Olimpik on 11 April 2021. He won his first trophy with Borac on 23 May 2021, getting crowned Bosnian Premier League champions one game before the end of the 2020–21 season.

== Honours ==
Borac Banja Luka

- Bosnian Premier League: 2020–21
