= NK Sloga Bosanska Otoka =

Football club in Bosnia and Herzegovina

NK Sloga
- Full name: Nogometni Klub "Sloga"
- Founded: 1922
- Ground: SRC Bare
- Capacity: 1,000
- Chairman: Džemaludin Čausević
- Manager: Edhem Mustedanagic
- League: Second League FBiH
- 2025–26: 11th
Home colours	Away colours

Nogometni Klub "Sloga" is a football club from Bosanska Otoka in Bosnia and Herzegovina. The club is currently playing in Druga liga FBiH (Second League of the Federation of Bosnia and Herzegovina).

== History ==
In the 1970s and 1980s, Sloga was a sports club that, in addition to a football club, also had a basketball, volleyball and chess club. In those years, Sloga played in the sub-federal league of the then Yugoslavia. It won the championship title several times in that league, but did not advance to a higher rank due to an inadequate stadium. It also played in the Marshal Tito Cup.

In 1987, it entered the Yugoslav republican league and became its standard member until the war in Bosnia and Herzegovina. During the war in Bosnia and Herzegovina, it did not work in Bosanska Otoka, but in one of the free territories of neighboring cities. At that time, it competed in a league that was established for clubs from the Bihać region. In 1998, it entered the Second League of the Federation of Bosnia and Herzegovina - West.
