= NK Stupčanica Olovo =

- Full name: Nogometni klub Stupčanica Olovo
- Founded: 1928; 98 years ago
- Ground: Danac Stadium, Olovo
- Capacity: 1,500
- Chairman: Semir Degirmendžić
- Manager: Mato Neretljak
- League: First League of FBiH
- 2025–26: First League of FBiH, 2nd of 14
- Website: https://nkstupcanica.ba
Home colours	Away colours

Nogometni klub Stupčanica Olovo is a professional football club, based in the town of Olovo, Bosnia and Herzegovina. The club currently plays in the First League of the Federation of Bosnia and Herzegovina and plays its home matches on the Danac Stadium in Olovo, which has a capacity of 1,500 seats.

== History ==
In 1924, the first football club in Olovo was founded under the name Bor. His successor is today's NK Stupčanica. In the 2010–11 season, Stupčanica became champions of the Zenica-Doboj Cantonal League and played the Second League of FBiH (center), the third level of football in Bosnia and Herzegovina, until the 2014–15 season. In the 2018–19 season, the club became champions of the cantonal league again and qualified for the third division again. In the 2021–22 season, Stupčanica was promoted from the Second League to the First League of FBiH.

== Honours ==
=== Domestic ===
==== League ====
- First League of the Federation of Bosnia and Herzegovina:
  - Winners (1): 2024–25
  - Runners-up (2): 2022–23, 2023–24
- Second League of the Federation of Bosnia and Herzegovina:
  - Winners (1): 2021–22 (center)

== Managerial history ==
- (Bosnia and Herzegovina) Faruk Dedić (15 October 2020 – 9 November 2022)
- (Bosnia and Herzegovina) Dženan Zaimović (11 November 2022 – 10 June 2024)
- (Bosnia and Herzegovina) Faruk Dedić (26 June 2024 – 13 April 2025)
- (Croatia) Denis Zovko (14 April 2025 – 8 October 2025)
- (Bosnia and Herzegovina) Dalibor Ignjić (8 October 2025 – 14 January 2026)
- (Bosnia and Herzegovina) Dženan Zaimović (15 January 2026 – 15 June 2026)
- (Croatia) Mato Neretljak (16 June 2026 – present)
