= 2020–21 Bosnia and Herzegovina Football Cup =

Football tournament season

25th Bosnia and Herzegovina Football Cup

Tournament details
- Country: Bosnia and Herzegovina
- Teams: 32

Final positions
- Champions: Sarajevo (7th title)
- Runners-up: Borac

Tournament statistics
- Matches played: 33
- Goals scored: 110 (3.33 per match)
- Top goal scorer(s): Anes Mašić (5 goals)

The 2020–21 Bosnia and Herzegovina Football Cup was the 25th edition of Bosnia and Herzegovina's annual football cup, and the twentieth season of the unified competition.

Sarajevo were the defending champions since the 2019–20 edition was abandoned due to the ongoing COVID-19 pandemic in Bosnia and Herzegovina. Sarajevo managed to once again win the cup after beating Borac Banja Luka in the final.

== Participating teams ==
The following teams took part in the 2020–21 Bosnia and Herzegovina Football Cup.

2020–21 Premier League (12 teams)	2020–21 FBiH Cup (II) (12 teams)	2020–21 Republika Srpska (II) (7 teams)	Football Association of Republika Srpska (1 team)
Željezničar; Krupa; Mladost Doboj Kakanj; Olimpik; Radnik Bijeljina; Sarajevo^{title holder}; Sloboda Tuzla; Široki Brijeg; Tuzla City; Zrinjski Mostar; Velež Mostar; Borac Banja Luka	First League of FBiH (II): Goražde; GOŠK Gabela; Igman Konjic; Rudar Kakanj; Budućnost Banovići; Zvijezda Gradačac; Travnik; Second League of FBiH (III): Dizdaruša Brčko (group North); Radnički Lukavac (group North); Klis Buturović Polje (group South); Unis Vogošća (group Center); League of Zenica-Doboj Canton (IV): Fortuna Zenica	Leotar; Tekstilac; Modriča; Rudar Prijedor; Slavija Sarajevo; Sloboda Novi Grad; Zvijezda 09	Velež Nevesinje (group East)

Roman number in brackets denote the level of respective league in Bosnian football league system

== Calendar ==
Round	Date(s)
1st Round	21 September 2020 (draw); 30 September 2020, 13 October 2020
2nd Round	6 October 2020 (draw); 21 October 2020, 14 November 2020
Quarter final	23 February 2021 (draw); 10 March 2021
Semi-finals	17 March 2021 (draw); 7 April 2021 (leg 1); 21 April 2021 (leg 2)
Final	26 May 2021

== Bracket ==
Quarter-finals
Tuzla City (p)	1 (3)
Željezničar	1 (2)
Sarajevo	1
Zrinjski Mostar	0
Široki Brijeg	0
Borac Banja Luka	2
Klis Buturović Polje	1
Zvijezda 09	0

Semi-finals
Tuzla City	0	1	1
Sarajevo	1	3	4
Borac Banja Luka	4	2	6
Klis Buturović Polje	1	1	2

Final
Sarajevo	0 (4)
Borac Banja Luka	0 (1)

== First round ==
Played on 30 September and 13 October 2020.

Home team	Away team	Result
Travnik (II)	Borac Banja Luka (I)	0–4
Rudar Prijedor (II)	Olimpik (I)	4–0
Goražde (II)	Sloboda Tuzla (I)	2–2 (7–6 p)
Radnički Lukavac (III)	Sarajevo (I)	0–4
Sloboda Novi Grad (II)	Tuzla City (I)	0–2
Budućnost Banovići (II)	Željezničar (I)	1–2
Tekstilac (II)	Zrinjski Mostar (I)	1–7
Dizdaruša Brčko (III)	Velež Mostar (I)	0–3
Slavija Sarajevo (II)	Mladost Doboj Kakanj (I)	2–2 (9–8 p)
GOŠK Gabela (II)	Široki Brijeg (I)	0–1
Zvijezda Gradačac (II)	Radnik Bijeljina (I)	0–1
Leotar (II)	Krupa (I)	0–4
Zvijezda 09 (II)	Modriča (II)	2–1
Klis Buturović Polje (III)	Unis Vogošća (III)	6–2
Velež Nevesinje (III)	Igman Konjic (II)	2–1
Fortuna Zenica (IV)	Rudar Kakanj (II)	0–1

== Second round ==
Played on 21 October and 14 November 2020.

Home team	Away team	Result
Tuzla City (I)	Radnik Bijeljina (I)	3–1
Željezničar (I)	Goražde (II)	3–0
Rudar Prijedor (II)	Zvijezda 09 (II)	0–0 (3–4 p)
Krupa (I)	Sarajevo (I)	2–4
Rudar Kakanj (II)	Borac Banja Luka (I)	1–6
Velež Mostar (I)	Široki Brijeg (I)	0–1
Zrinjski Mostar (I)	Slavija Sarajevo (II)	4–0
Velež Nevesinje (III)	Klis Buturović Polje (III)	0–2

== Quarter-finals ==
Played on 10 March 2021.

Home team	Away team	Result
Sarajevo (I)	Zrinjski Mostar (I)	1–0
Široki Brijeg (I)	Borac Banja Luka (I)	0–2
Tuzla City (I)	Željezničar (I)	1–1 (3–2 p)
Klis Buturović Polje (III)	Zvijezda 09 (II)	1–0

== Semi-finals ==
The first legs were played on 7 April, and the second legs were played on 21 April 2021.

Team 1	Team 2	Leg 1	Leg 2	Agg. score
Tuzla City (I)	Sarajevo (I)	0–1	1–3	1–4
Borac Banja Luka (I)	Klis Buturović Polje (III)	4–1	2–1	6–2

== Final ==
The final was played on 26 May 2021.

=== Details ===
26 May 2021
17:00

Sarajevo	0–0	Borac Banja Luka
	Report
Penalties
Miličević (penalty scored); Velkoski (penalty scored); Mustedanagić (penalty scored); Handžić (penalty scored)	4–1	(penalty missed) Čavić; (penalty missed) Tahrić; (penalty scored) Uzelac

Bosnian FA Training Centre, Zenica
Attendance: 0
Referee: Irfan Peljto (Sarajevo)
