= 2018–19 FK Željezničar season =

Željezničar
2018–19 season
- Chairman: Senad Misimović (until 16 December); Nihad Selimović (from 23 December)
- Manager: Slobodan Krčmarević (until 30 July); Milomir Odović (from 30 July) – (until 27 November); Amar Osim (from 31 December)
- Stadium: Grbavica Stadium
- Premijer Liga BiH: 4th
- Kup BiH: Round of 32
- UEFA Europa League: 2Q Round
- Top goalscorer: League: Sulejman Krpić (16); All: Sulejman Krpić (19)
- Highest home attendance: 10,056 vs Sarajevo (15 August 2018)
- Lowest home attendance: 1,911 vs Zvijezda 09 (28 October 2018)
Home colours	Away colours	Third colours

The 2018–2019 season was Željezničar's 98th in existence and their 19th season in the Premijer Liga BiH. The team competed in the Premijer Liga BiH, Kup BiH and the UEFA Europa League.

The club finished on 4th place in the league, while it got knocked out from the cup in the first round. In the season, Željezničar primarily also qualified to the 2019–20 UEFA Europa League qualifying rounds, but the club didn't get an UEFA licence and eventually, 5th placed FK Radnik Bijeljina got qualified.

== Squad information ==
=== Players ===
N	Pos.	Nat.	Name	Age	EU	Since	App	Goals	Ends	Transfer fee	Notes
1	GK	(Bosnia and Herzegovina)	Fejzić	39	Non-EU	2016	19	0	2019	Free	
2	DF	(Serbia)	Stevanović	36	Non-EU	2016	95	0	2019	Free	Second nationality: Croatia
3	DF	(Croatia)	Pavić	30	EU	2018	31	0	2020	Free	Second nationality: BiH
4	MF	(Bosnia and Herzegovina)	Šabanadžović	26	Non-EU	2017	52	3	2020	Free	On loan from AEK Athens
5	DF	(Bosnia and Herzegovina)	Bajić	27	Non-EU	2019	1	0	2020	Free	Second nationality: Serbia
6	MF	(Bosnia and Herzegovina)	A. Zec	31	Non-EU	2017	64	12	2020	Free	
7	FW	(Bosnia and Herzegovina)	Krpić	34	Non-EU	2018	36	19	2020	Free	
8	MF	(Bosnia and Herzegovina)	Mujezinović	32	Non-EU	2019	13	0	2021	Free	
9	MF	(Bosnia and Herzegovina)	Ramović	32	Non-EU	2017	45	5	2020	Free	
10	FW	(Bosnia and Herzegovina)	E. Zec	37	Non-EU	2019	6	4	2019	Free	
11	DF	(Bosnia and Herzegovina)	Stanić	36	Non-EU	2019	260	11	2020	Free	
13	GK	(Bosnia and Herzegovina)	Kjosevski	30	Non-EU	2013	124	1	2020	Youth system	Second nationality: Macedonia
15	DF	(Bosnia and Herzegovina)	Bogičević	42	Non-EU	2016	197	11	2021	Free	
16	DF	(Bosnia and Herzegovina)	Zilić	25	Non-EU	2018	3	0	2019	Youth system	
17	MF	(Bosnia and Herzegovina)	Osmanović	25	Non-EU	2017	8	0	2022	Youth system	
18	MF	(Bosnia and Herzegovina)	Zajmović	30	Non-EU	2017	49	8	2020	Free	Originally from youth system
20	MF	(Bosnia and Herzegovina)	Veselinović	32	Non-EU	2018	28	2	2020	Free	
22	MF	(Bosnia and Herzegovina)	Sadiković	30	Non-EU	2019	94	9	2020	Free	Originally from youth system
24	FW	(Bosnia and Herzegovina)	Zubanović	25	Non-EU	2018	1	0	2021	Youth system	
25	MF	(Bosnia and Herzegovina)	Hajdarević	26	Non-EU	2017	54	1	2021	Youth system	
27	DF	(Bosnia and Herzegovina)	Osmanković	28	Non-EU	2014	40	1	2020	Youth system	
40	DF	(Bosnia and Herzegovina)	Sipvić	35	Non-EU	2019	12	0	2020	Free	Originally from youth system
44	DF	(Bosnia and Herzegovina)	Rodin	29	Non-EU	2018	26	3	2021	Free	Second nationality: Croatia
47	MF	(Croatia)	Klepač	27	EU	2019	4	0	2019	Free	On loan from Osijek II
–	GK	(Bosnia and Herzegovina)	Ćeman	30	Non-EU	2014	1	0	2019	Youth system	On loan to Igman
–	GK	(Bosnia and Herzegovina)	Karavdić	27	Non-EU	2017	0	0	2020	Youth system	On loan to Jedinstvo Bihać
–	DF	(Bosnia and Herzegovina)	A. Šehić	26	Non-EU	2017	1	0	2021	Youth system	On loan to Igman
–	MF	(Bosnia and Herzegovina)	Žerić	27	Non-EU	2015	30	2	2020	Youth system	On loan to Igman
–	MF	(Bosnia and Herzegovina)	E. Šehić	25	Non-EU	2018	5	0	2021	Youth system	On loan to TOŠK Tešanj
–	FW	(Bosnia and Herzegovina)	Dacić	26	Non-EU	2018	13	1	2020	Youth system	On loan to TOŠK Tešanj

- Last updated: 25 May 2019
- Source: fkzeljeznicar.ba

=== Disciplinary record ===
Includes all competitive matches. The list is sorted by position, and then shirt number.

N	P	Nat.	Name	League			Cup			Europe			Others			Total			Notes
N	P	Nat.	Name	Yellow card	Second yellow card	Red card	Yellow card	Second yellow card	Red card	Yellow card	Second yellow card	Red card	Yellow card	Second yellow card	Red card	Yellow card	Second yellow card	Red card	Notes
1	GK	(Bosnia and Herzegovina)	Fejzić																
2	DF	(Serbia)	Stevanović	7												7			
3	DF	(Croatia)	Pavić	5						1						6			
4	MF	(Bosnia and Herzegovina)	Šabanadžović	9												9			
5	DF	(Bosnia and Herzegovina)	Bajić																
6	MF	(Bosnia and Herzegovina)	A. Zec	2						1						3			
7	FW	(Bosnia and Herzegovina)	Krpić	5						1						6			
8	MF	(Bosnia and Herzegovina)	Mujezinović	2												2			
9	MF	(Bosnia and Herzegovina)	Ramović	4												4			
10	FW	(Bosnia and Herzegovina)	E. Zec	3												3			
11	DF	(Bosnia and Herzegovina)	Stanić	1												1			
13	GK	(Bosnia and Herzegovina)	Kjosevski																
15	DF	(Bosnia and Herzegovina)	Bogičević	4												4			
16	DF	(Bosnia and Herzegovina)	Zilić	1												1			
17	MF	(Bosnia and Herzegovina)	Osmanović	2												2			
18	FW	(Bosnia and Herzegovina)	Zajmović	2												2			
20	MF	(Bosnia and Herzegovina)	Veselinović	2						1						3			
22	MF	(Bosnia and Herzegovina)	Sadiković	5												5			
24	FW	(Bosnia and Herzegovina)	Zubanović																
25	MF	(Bosnia and Herzegovina)	Hajdarević	4												4			
27	DF	(Bosnia and Herzegovina)	Osmanković	4			1									5			
40	DF	(Bosnia and Herzegovina)	Sipović	3												3			
44	DF	(Bosnia and Herzegovina)	Rodin	2			1									3			
47	MF	(Croatia)	Klepač																

Last updated: 25 May 2019
Source: Competitive matches and fkzeljeznicar.ba
Ordered by (red card) , (second yellow card) and (yellow card)
(yellow card) = Number of bookings; (second yellow card) = Number of sending offs after a second yellow card; (red card) = Number of sending offs by a direct red card.

== Squad statistics ==
=== Goalscorers ===
No.	Pos.	Nation	Name	Premijer Liga BiH	Kup BiH	Europa League	Total
7	FW	(Bosnia and Herzegovina)	Krpić	16	0	3	19
6	MF	(Bosnia and Herzegovina)	A. Zec	6	0	1	7
10	FW	(Bosnia and Herzegovina)	E. Zec	4	0	0	4
44	DF	(Bosnia and Herzegovina)	Rodin	3	0	0	3
18	MF	(Bosnia and Herzegovina)	Zajmović	2	0	1	3
90	MF	(Croatia)	Jazvić	2	0	0	2
20	MF	(Bosnia and Herzegovina)	Veselinović	2	0	0	2
25	MF	(Bosnia and Herzegovina)	Hajdarević	2	0	0	2
4	MF	(Croatia)	Čurjurić	1	0	0	1
23	MF	(Bosnia and Herzegovina)	Vranješ	1	0	0	1
10	MF	(Bosnia and Herzegovina)	Arežina	1	0	0	1
21	MF	(Bosnia and Herzegovina)	Dacić	1	0	0	1
22	MF	(Bosnia and Herzegovina)	Sadiković	1	0	0	1
9	MF	(Bosnia and Herzegovina)	Ramović	1	0	0	1
4	MF	(Bosnia and Herzegovina)	Šabanadžović	0	0	1	1
#	Own goals			0	0	1	1
TOTAL				36	0	7	43

Last updated: 25 May 2019

=== Assists ===
No.	Pos.	Nation	Name	Premijer Liga BiH	Kup BiH	Europa League	Total
4	MF	(Croatia)	Čurjurić	4	0	3	7
2	DF	(Serbia)	Stevanović	5	0	0	5
20	MF	(Bosnia and Herzegovina)	Veselinović	3	0	2	5
3	DF	(Croatia)	Pavić	3	0	1	4
18	MF	(Bosnia and Herzegovina)	Zajmović	3	0	0	3
9	MF	(Bosnia and Herzegovina)	Ramović	2	0	0	2
11	MF	(Serbia)	Blagojević	2	0	1	3
10	FW	(Bosnia and Herzegovina)	E. Zec	2	0	0	2
8	MF	(Bosnia and Herzegovina)	Mujezinović	2	0	0	2
7	FW	(Bosnia and Herzegovina)	Krpić	1	0	0	1
21	MF	(Bosnia and Herzegovina)	Dacić	1	0	0	1
6	MF	(Bosnia and Herzegovina)	A. Zec	1	0	0	1
17	MF	(Bosnia and Herzegovina)	Osmanović	1	0	0	1
22	MF	(Bosnia and Herzegovina)	Sadiković	1	0	0	1
TOTAL				28	0	7	35

Last updated: 25 May 2019

=== Clean sheets ===
No.	Nation	Name	Premijer Liga BiH	Kup BiH	UEFA Europa League	Total	Games played
13	(Bosnia and Herzegovina)	Kjosevski	8	0	1	9	27
1	(Bosnia and Herzegovina)	Fejzić	5	0	0	5	11
TOTAL			13	0	1	14	38

Last updated: 25 May 2019

== Transfers ==
=== Players in ===
No.	Pos.	Nat.	Name	Age	EU	Moving from	Type	Transfer window	Ends	Transfer fee	Source
7	FW	(Bosnia and Herzegovina)	Sulejman Krpić	34	Non-EU	Tractor Sazi (Iran)	End of contract	Summer	2020	Free	fkzeljeznicar.ba
5	DF	(Montenegro)	Miloš Bakrač	33	Non-EU	Sutjeska Nikšić (Montenegro)	End of contract	Summer	2020	Free	fkzeljeznicar.ba
20	MF	(Bosnia and Herzegovina)	Mladen Veselinović	32	Non-EU	Borac Banja Luka	End of contract	Summer	2020	Free	fkzeljeznicar.ba
3	DF	(Croatia)	Antonio Pavić	30	EU	Istra 1961 (Croatia)	End of contract	Summer	2020	Free	fkzeljeznicar.ba
4	MF	(Croatia)	Ivan Čurjurić	35	EU	EN Paralimni (Cyprus)	End of contract	Summer	2019	Free	fkzeljeznicar.ba
10	MF	(Bosnia and Herzegovina)	Filip Arežina	32	Non-EU	Mladost Doboj Kakanj	Loan	Summer	2020	Free	fkzeljeznicar.ba
44	DF	(Bosnia and Herzegovina)	Matej Rodin	29	Non-EU	Zrinjski	End of contract	Summer	2021	Free	fkzeljeznicar.ba
90	MF	(Croatia)	Filip Jazvić	34	EU	Olimpia Grudziądz (Poland)	End of contract	Summer	2019	Free	fkzeljeznicar.ba
4	MF	(Bosnia and Herzegovina)	Anel Šabanadžović	26	Non-EU	AEK Athens (Greece)	Loan	Winter	2019	Free	
47	MF	(Croatia)	Mihael Klepač	27	EU	Osijek II (Croatia)	Loan	Winter	2019	Free	fkzeljeznicar.ba
10	FW	(Bosnia and Herzegovina)	Ermin Zec	37	Non-EU	Gazişehir Gaziantep (Turkey)	End of contract	Winter	2019	Free	fkzeljeznicar.ba
11	DF	(Bosnia and Herzegovina)	Srđan Stanić	36	Non-EU	Zrinjski	End of contract	Winter	2020	Free	fkzeljeznicar.ba
5	DF	(Bosnia and Herzegovina)	Branko Bajić	27	Non-EU	Dunajská Streda (Slovakia)	End of contract	Winter	2020	Free	fkzeljeznicar.ba
8	MF	(Bosnia and Herzegovina)	Mustafa Mujezinović	32	Non-EU	Velež	End of contract	Winter	2021	Free	fkzeljeznicar.ba
40	DF	(Bosnia and Herzegovina)	Enes Sipović	35	Non-EU	Ohod (Saudi Arabia)	End of contract	Winter	2020	Free	fkzeljeznicar.ba
22	MF	(Bosnia and Herzegovina)	Damir Sadiković	30	Non-EU	Mladost Doboj Kakanj	End of contract	Winter	2020	Free	fkzeljeznicar.ba

Total expenditure: ▼€0

=== Players out ===
No.	Pos.	Nat.	Name	Age	EU	Moving to	Type	Transfer window	Transfer fee	Source
5	DF	(Bosnia and Herzegovina)	Daniel Graovac	32	Non-EU	Mouscron (Belgium)	End of loan	Summer	Free	
20	MF	(Bosnia and Herzegovina)	Zajko Zeba	42	Non-EU	Retirement	End of career	Summer	N/A	fkzeljeznicar.ba
7	MF	(Croatia)	Ivan Crnov	35	EU	Krupa	End of contract	Summer	Free	
51	FW	(Serbia)	Vojo Ubiparip	37	Non-EU	Tuzla City	End of contract	Summer	Free	
4	FW	(Bosnia and Herzegovina)	Saša Kajkut	41	Non-EU	Borac Banja Luka	End of contract	Summer	Free	fkborac.net
3	DF	(Bosnia and Herzegovina)	Amar Beširević	26	Non-EU	Olimpik	End of contract	Summer	Free	
34	DF	(Bosnia and Herzegovina)	Amir Velić	26	Non-EU	Bosna Visoko	End of contract	Summer	Free	nkbosna.ba
31	DF	(Bosnia and Herzegovina)	Benjamin Šehić	26	Non-EU	Goražde	End of contract	Summer	Free	
35	GK	(Bosnia and Herzegovina)	Filip Dujmović	26	Non-EU	Adana Demirspor (Turkey)	End of contract	Summer	Free	
34	MF	(Bosnia and Herzegovina)	Kemal Mujarić	26	Non-EU	Dugopolje (Croatia)	End of contract	Summer	Free	
28	DF	(Bosnia and Herzegovina)	Tarik Džindo	26	Non-EU	Free agent	End of contract	Summer	Free	
22	DF	(Croatia)	Kenan Hadžić	31	EU	Swift Hesperange (Luxembourg)	Contract termination	Summer	Free	fkzeljeznicar.ba
29	MF	(Bosnia and Herzegovina)	Andrej Modić	29	Non-EU	Krupa	Contract termination	Summer	Free	fkzeljeznicar.ba
21	MF	(Bosnia and Herzegovina)	Meldin Jusufi	26	Non-EU	Olimpik	Contract termination	Summer	Free	
8	DF	(Bosnia and Herzegovina)	Adi Mehremić	33	Non-EU	Karpaty Lviv (Ukraine)	Contract termination	Summer	Free	fkzeljeznicar.ba
24	FW	(Bosnia and Herzegovina)	Ajdin Mujagić	27	Non-EU	Mladost Doboj Kakanj	Contract termination	Summer	Free	
33	DF	(Serbia)	Josip Projić	38	Non-EU	Napredak Kruševac (Serbia)	Contract termination	Summer	Free	
14	DF	(Bosnia and Herzegovina)	Almir Ćubara	27	Non-EU	Bosna Visoko	Loan	Summer	Free	nkbosna.ba
39	MF	(Bosnia and Herzegovina)	Denis Žerić	27	Non-EU	Igman	Loan	Summer	Free	
30	FW	(Bosnia and Herzegovina)	Mirza Šubo	27	Non-EU	Goražde	Loan	Summer	Free	
32	DF	(Bosnia and Herzegovina)	Haris Kurtović	26	Non-EU	Goražde	Loan	Summer	Free	
22	GK	(Bosnia and Herzegovina)	Vernes Karavdić	27	Non-EU	Travnik	Loan	Summer	Free	
17	MF	(Bosnia and Herzegovina)	Goran Zakarić	32	Non-EU	Partizan (Serbia)	Transfer	Summer	€150,000	partizan.rs
10	MF	(Bosnia and Herzegovina)	Filip Arežina	32	Non-EU	Mladost Doboj Kakanj	Released	Winter	Free	
30	FW	(Bosnia and Herzegovina)	Mirza Šubo	27	Non-EU	Rudar Kakanj	Loan	Winter	Free	
11	MF	(Serbia)	Jovan Blagojević	37	Non-EU	Osmanlıspor (Turkey)	Contract termination	Winter	Free	osmanlispor.com.tr
90	MF	(Croatia)	Filip Jazvić	34	EU	Hermannstadt (Romania)	Contract termination	Winter	Free	fkzeljeznicar.ba
4	MF	(Croatia)	Ivan Čurjurić	35	EU	Zrinjski	Contract termination	Winter	Free	fkzeljeznicar.ba
5	DF	(Montenegro)	Miloš Bakrač	33	Non-EU	OFK Titograd (Montenegro)	Contract termination	Winter	Free	fkzeljeznicar.ba
4	MF	(Bosnia and Herzegovina)	Anel Šabanadžović	26	Non-EU	AEK Athens (Greece)	Transfer	Winter	€450,000	aekfc.gr
14	DF	(Bosnia and Herzegovina)	Almir Ćubara	27	Non-EU	Olimpik	Contract termination	Winter	Free	
23	MF	(Bosnia and Herzegovina)	Stojan Vranješ	38	Non-EU	Borac Banja Luka	Contract termination	Winter	Free	fkborac.net
22	GK	(Bosnia and Herzegovina)	Vernes Karavdić	27	Non-EU	Jedinstvo Bihać	Loan	Winter	Free	fkzeljeznicar.ba
12	GK	(Bosnia and Herzegovina)	Aldin Ćeman	30	Non-EU	Igman	Loan	Winter	Free	fkzeljeznicar.ba
14	DF	(Bosnia and Herzegovina)	Aldin Šehić	26	Non-EU	Igman	Loan	Winter	Free	fkzeljeznicar.ba
39	MF	(Bosnia and Herzegovina)	Denis Žerić	27	Non-EU	Igman	Loan	Winter	Free	fkzeljeznicar.ba
8	MF	(Bosnia and Herzegovina)	Eldar Šehić	25	Non-EU	TOŠK Tešanj	Loan	Winter	Free	fkzeljeznicar.ba
21	MF	(Bosnia and Herzegovina)	Semir Dacić	26	Non-EU	TOŠK Tešanj	Loan	Winter	Free	fkzeljeznicar.ba
21	MF	(Bosnia and Herzegovina)	Haris Kurtović	26	Non-EU	Olimpik	Contract termination	Winter	Free	

Total income: ▲€600,000 Net: ▲€600,000

== Club ==
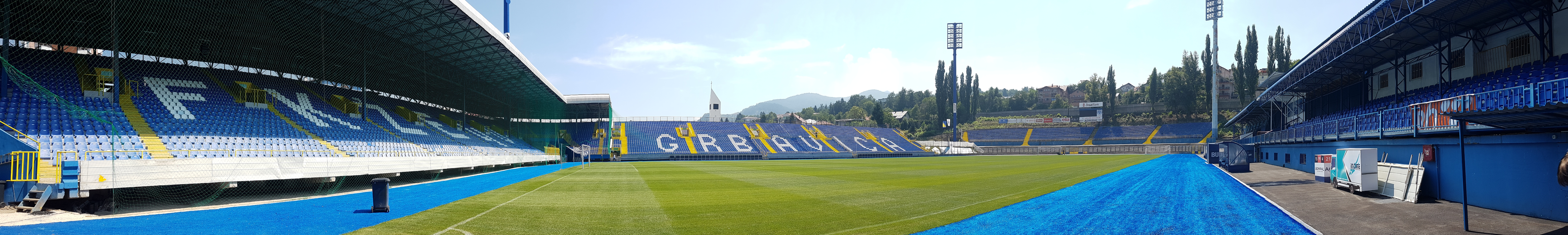
A panoramic view of Grbavica Stadium, August 2018

=== Coaching staff ===
Name	Role
(Bosnia and Herzegovina) Amar Osim	Head coach
(Bosnia and Herzegovina) Almir Memić	Assistant coach
(Bosnia and Herzegovina) Adin Mulaosmanović	Assistant
(Bosnia and Herzegovina) Bakir Šerbo	Assistant
(Bosnia and Herzegovina) Adnan Gušo	Goalkeeping coach
(Bosnia and Herzegovina) Anel Hidić	Fitness coach
(Bosnia and Herzegovina) Nedim Čović	Fitness coach
(Bosnia and Herzegovina) Elvis Karić	Head scout
(Bosnia and Herzegovina) Raif Zeba	Physiotherapist
(Bosnia and Herzegovina) Mirza Halvadžija	Physiotherapist
(Bosnia and Herzegovina) Emin Džaferović	Physiotherapist
(Bosnia and Herzegovina) Erdijan Pekić	Commissioner for Security
(Bosnia and Herzegovina) Zlatko Dervišević	Doctor
(Bosnia and Herzegovina) Mahir Moro	Doctor

=== Other information ===
Honorary Chairman of the Club	(Socialist Federal Republic of Yugoslavia) (Bosnia and Herzegovina) Ivica Osim
Chairman of the Assembly	(Bosnia and Herzegovina) Adnan Džindo
Chairman of the Supervisory Board	(Bosnia and Herzegovina) Midhat Terzić
Chairman of the Board	(Bosnia and Herzegovina) Nihad Selimović
Director	(Bosnia and Herzegovina) Mirsad Šiljak (suspended) (Bosnia and Herzegovina) Jasmin Badžak (interim)
Head coach	(Bosnia and Herzegovina) Amar Osim
Ground (capacity and dimensions)	Grbavica Stadium (16,100 / 105x66 m)

Source: FK Željezničar and Grbavica Stadium

=== Sponsorship ===
As of 19 March 2019

Name	Type
(Italy) UniCredit Bank	Gold sponsor
(Bosnia and Herzegovina) Sarajevo Osiguranje	Gold sponsor
(United Kingdom) Admiral Casino	Gold sponsor
(Bosnia and Herzegovina) Lutrija BiH	Gold sponsor
(Bosnia and Herzegovina) Telemach	Blue sponsor
(Bosnia and Herzegovina) Elpi	Sponsor
(Bosnia and Herzegovina) Bony	Sponsor
(Bosnia and Herzegovina) KupiTehniku.ba	Sponsor
(Bosnia and Herzegovina) SBC	Sponsor
(France) Hotel Novotel	Sponsor
(Bosnia and Herzegovina) Milkos	Sponsor
(Bosnia and Herzegovina) Klas	Sponsor
(Slovenia) Europlakat	Sponsor
(Bosnia and Herzegovina) Hotel Hills	Sponsor
(Bosnia and Herzegovina) Atos osiguranje	Sponsor
(Bosnia and Herzegovina) GP Butmir	Sponsor
(Bosnia and Herzegovina) Tržnice-Pijace	Sponsor
(Bosnia and Herzegovina) Eurofarm	Sponsor
(Sweden) Securitas	Sponsor
(Bosnia and Herzegovina) ALMA RAS	Sponsor
(Bosnia and Herzegovina) HOTEL EXCLUSIVE	Sponsor
(Bosnia and Herzegovina) Slatko i slano	Sponsor
(Italy) Mark Medical	Sponsor
(Bosnia and Herzegovina) In Time	Sponsor
(Bosnia and Herzegovina) Apoteka Dina	Sponsor
(Bosnia and Herzegovina) Hadžo stil	Sponsor
(Bosnia and Herzegovina) Kristal	Sponsor
(Germany) Mann Hummel	Sponsor
(Bosnia and Herzegovina) Mikrokreditna fondacija Sunrise	Sponsor
(Bosnia and Herzegovina) Sarajevsko pivo	Sponsor
(Bosnia and Herzegovina) Euroherc	Sponsor
(Croatia) Sky Cola	Sponsor
(Italy) Manuel Caffè	Sponsor
(Bosnia and Herzegovina) PENNY PLUS	Sponsor
(Croatia) Deep Relief	Sponsor
(Bosnia and Herzegovina) ASA	Sponsor
(Bosnia and Herzegovina) Ugarak	Sponsor
(Bosnia and Herzegovina) BBI	Sponsor
(Bosnia and Herzegovina) Hotel Grad	Sponsor
(Bosnia and Herzegovina) Domod	Sponsor
(Bosnia and Herzegovina) (Germany) Transportbeton	Sponsor
(Bosnia and Herzegovina) nLogic Advisory	Sponsor
(Bosnia and Herzegovina) NEBI	Sponsor
(Bosnia and Herzegovina) Nexe beton d.o.o.	Sponsor
(Bosnia and Herzegovina) SUNRISE	Sponsor
(Bosnia and Herzegovina) Fixit	Technical sponsor
(Bosnia and Herzegovina) Tehno Mag	Technical sponsor
(Bosnia and Herzegovina) PAL-e	Technical sponsor
(Turkey) Jeordie's	Technical sponsor
(United Kingdom) Umbro	Technical sponsor
(Bosnia and Herzegovina) Centrotrans	Technical sponsor
(Bosnia and Herzegovina) General Logistic	Technical sponsor
(Bosnia and Herzegovina) BiH.ba	Media partner
(Turkey) Anadolu Agency	Media partner
(Bosnia and Herzegovina) Hayat	Media partner
(Bosnia and Herzegovina) Antena Sarajevo	Media partner
(Bosnia and Herzegovina) Sport1.ba	Media partner
(Bosnia and Herzegovina) Klix.ba	Media partner
(Bosnia and Herzegovina) Dnevni avaz	Media partner
(Bosnia and Herzegovina) Oktal Pharma	Community partner
(Bosnia and Herzegovina) MFS-Emmaus	Community partner
(Bosnia and Herzegovina) SUMERO	Community partner
(Bosnia and Herzegovina) Ruku na srce	Community partner
(Bosnia and Herzegovina) Emado d.o.o.	Community partner

== Competitions ==
=== Pre-season ===
25 June 2018	Željezničar (Bosnia and Herzegovina)	1–2	(Bosnia and Herzegovina) GOŠK Gabela	Međugorje
18:00	Blagojević 45'	Report	Raguž 63'; Ereiz 90'

29 June 2018	Široki Brijeg (Bosnia and Herzegovina)	2–1	(Bosnia and Herzegovina) Željezničar	Široki Brijeg
	Bagarić 45'; Begonja 55'	Report	Krpić 88'	Stadium: Pecara Stadium

5 July 2018	Velež (Bosnia and Herzegovina)	3–3	(Bosnia and Herzegovina) Željezničar	Mostar
18:00	Osmanković 18' (o.g.); Brandao 19', 26'	Report	Bakrač 31'; Arežina 48'; Zajmović 75'	Stadium: Vrapčići Stadium

=== Mid-season ===
29 August 2018	Ozren Semizovac (Bosnia and Herzegovina)	0–6	(Bosnia and Herzegovina) Željezničar	Semizovac
17:30		Report	Mušović 22'; Dacić 24', 71', 77'; Mujić 33'; Aljić 72'

10 October 2018	Sutjeska Foča (Bosnia and Herzegovina)	0–2	(Bosnia and Herzegovina) Željezničar	Foča
16:30		Report	Zajmović 36'; Dacić 78'	Stadium: Gradski Stadion

21 January 2019	Željezničar (Bosnia and Herzegovina)	2–1	(Bosnia and Herzegovina) Sloboda Tuzla	Međugorje
14:15	Veselinović 105'; Zec 107'	Report	Livančić 93'

23 January 2019	Željezničar (Bosnia and Herzegovina)	2–1	(Bosnia and Herzegovina) Čapljina	Međugorje
14:30	Zubanović 5'; Selemenev 38'	Report	Zubac 50'

26 January 2019	Željezničar (Bosnia and Herzegovina)	4–0	(Bosnia and Herzegovina) Igman Konjic	Međugorje
14:30	Krpić 12'; Dacić 67'; Klepač 70'; Žerić 71'	Report

29 January 2019	Željezničar (Bosnia and Herzegovina)	2–3	(Bosnia and Herzegovina) Tuzla City	Međugorje
14:00	Šabanadžović 40'; Osmanković 66'	Report	Musić 68'; Crnkić 69'; Hajrović 97'

4 February 2019	Željezničar (Bosnia and Herzegovina)	2–2	(North Macedonia) Shkëndija	Antalya, Turkey
17:00	Krpić 14'; Zec 39'	Report	Emini 52'; Ibraimi 67'

7 February 2019	Željezničar (Bosnia and Herzegovina)	2–0	(Ukraine) Vorskla Poltava	Antalya, Turkey
14:30	Ramović 45'; Osmanković 59'	Report

10 February 2019	Željezničar (Bosnia and Herzegovina)	0–1	(Russia) Sochi	Antalya, Turkey
13:00		Report	Salamatov 20'

11 February 2019	Željezničar (Bosnia and Herzegovina)	2–1	(Ukraine) Oleksandriya	Antalya, Turkey
17:00	Krpić 80'; Zajmović 86'	Report	Ustymenko 90'

15 February 2019	Željezničar (Bosnia and Herzegovina)	0–0	(Bosnia and Herzegovina) Olimpik	Međugorje
14:30		Report

13 March 2019	Željezničar (Bosnia and Herzegovina)	7–0	(Bosnia and Herzegovina) Pofalički	Sarajevo
16:00	E. Zec 12', 17', 20'; A. Zec 25', 46'; Osmanović 28'; Bezdrob	Report

=== Overall ===
Competition	Started round	Final result	First match	Last Match
Premijer Liga BiH	—	4th	21 July 2018	25 May 2019
Kup BiH	Round of 32	Round of 32	19 September 2018	19 September 2018
UEFA Europa League	1Q	2Q	12 July 2018	2 August 2018

=== Regular season table ===
Pos	Team	Pld	W	D	L	GF	GA	GD	Pts	Qualification or relegation
2	Zrinjski Mostar	33	19	8	6	46	22	+24	65	Qualification for the Europa League first qualifying round (Note: Since the winners of the 2018–19 Bosnian Cup, Sarajevo, qualified for European competition based on league position, the spot awarded to the cup winners (Europa League first qualifying round) was passed to the fourth-placed team.)
3	Široki Brijeg	33	13	15	5	40	23	+17	54	Qualification for the Europa League first qualifying round
4	Željezničar	33	14	8	11	43	32	+11	50	Ineligible for 2019–20 European competitions (Note: As 4th placed Željezničar failed to get the UEFA license for the competition due to financial problems, Radnik Bijeljina was awarded the place as the next best placed team (5th place).)
5	Radnik Bijeljina	33	10	14	9	29	25	+4	44	Qualification for the Europa League first qualifying round
6	Mladost Doboj Kakanj	33	12	7	14	36	45	−9	43	

Source: Football Association of Bosnia and Herzegovina, Soccerway, UEFA
Rules for classification: 1) Points; 2) Goal difference; 3) Goals scored; 4) Head-to-head points; 5) Head-to-head goal difference; 6) Head-to-head away goals (only if two teams); 7) Head-to-head goals scored; 8) Goal difference; 9) Play-off. (Criteria 2 and 3 are not used to decide champion, UEFA competition qualification, or relegation)

==== Results summary ====
Overall								Home						Away					
Pld	W	D	L	GF	GA	GD	Pts	W	D	L	GF	GA	GD	W	D	L	GF	GA	GD
33	14	8	11	43	32	+11	50	7	4	6	24	21	+3	7	4	5	19	11	+8

Last updated: complete.
Source: Sportsport.ba

==== Results by round ====
Round	1	2	3	4	5	6	7	8	9	10	11	12	13	14	15	16	17	18	19	20	21	22	23	24	25	26	27	28	29	30	31	32	33
Ground	A	A	H	A	H	A	H	A	H	A	H	H	H	A	H	A	H	A	H	A	H	A	H	A	H	A	H	H	A	H	A	H	A
Result	W	L	W	W	D	W	D	W	W	D	D	L	W	W	L	L	L	L	L	L	W	D	W	D	L	L	W	D	D	W	W	L	W
Position	3	6	3	1	2	1	2	1	1	2	2	3	3	2	3	3	3	3	4	5	4	3	3	3	4	4	4	4	4	4	4	4	4
Points	3	3	6	9	10	13	14	17	20	21	22	22	25	28	28	28	28	28	28	28	31	32	35	36	36	36	39	40	41	44	47	47	50

Source: Competitions
A = Away; H = Home; W = Win; D = Draw; L = Loss

==== Matches ====
21 July 2018 1	GOŠK Gabela	0–1	Željezničar	Gabela
17:30	Hasanović (yellow card) 52'; Đajić (yellow card) 66'	Report	Šabanadžović (yellow card) 56'; Zec 75'	Stadium: Stadium Perica-Pero Pavlović; Attendance: 800; Referee: Zoran Grbić (Prijedor)

29 July 2018 2	Čelik	1–0	Željezničar	Zenica
20:30	Šišić (yellow card) 75'; Dedić 82', (yellow card) 90+'; Livaja (yellow card) 90+'; Vrhovac (yellow card) 90+'; Nikolić (yellow card) 90+'	Report	Osmanković (yellow card) 52'; Arežina (yellow card) 79'	Stadium: Bilino Polje Stadium; Attendance: 7,000; Referee: Dragan Petrović (Banja Luka)

5 August 2018 3	Željezničar	2–0	Zrinjski	Sarajevo
21:00	Pavić (yellow card) 13'; Krpić 36', 40'; Bogičević (yellow card) 45+1'	Report	Bilbija (yellow card) 32'	Stadium: Grbavica Stadium; Attendance: 4,483; Referee: Zoran Grbić (Prijedor)

12 August 2018 4	Zvijezda 09	1–3	Željezničar	Ugljevik
17:30	Huseinbašić (yellow card) 60'; Krajišnik 64' (pen.), (yellow card) 69'; Babić (yellow card) 73'	Report	Krpić 19', 52', (yellow card) 72'; Šabanadžović (yellow card) 60'; Stevanović (yellow card) 66'; Vranješ (yellow card) 78'; Arežina 86'	Stadium: Ugljevik City Stadium; Attendance: 1,100; Referee: Goran Paradžik (Ljubuški)

15 August 2018 5	Željezničar	2–2	Sarajevo	Sarajevo
20:15	Zajmović 21', 73'; Pavić (yellow card) 56'; Ćurjurić (yellow card) 76'; Vranješ (yellow card) 80'; Bogičević (yellow card) 90'	Report	Tatar 15'; Adukor (yellow card) 19'; Rahmanović (yellow card) 38', (goal) 39'; Stanojević (yellow card) 45'; Pidro (yellow card) 70'; Mujakić (yellow card) 84'	Stadium: Grbavica Stadium; Attendance: 10,056; Referee: Haris Kaljanac (Sarajevo)

19 August 2018 6	Tuzla City	0–2	Željezničar	Tuzla
19:00	Kostić (yellow card) 39'; Poturalić (yellow card) 87'; Fejzić (yellow card) 90'	Report	Šabanadžović (yellow card) 43'; Ćurjurić 56'; Vranješ 90+3'	Stadium: Tušanj City Stadium; Attendance: 3,500; Referee: Ermin Sivac (Zenica)

26 August 2018 7	Željezničar	1–1	Krupa	Sarajevo
20:00	Krpić 8'; Bakrač (yellow card) 70'; Hajdarević (yellow card) 89'	Report	Handžić (yellow card) 28'; Makitan (yellow card) 45'; Koljić 68'; Milanović (yellow card) 83'; Kutić (yellow card) 90'	Stadium: Grbavica Stadium; Attendance: 3,017; Referee: Goran Paradžik (Ljubuški)

2 September 2018 8	Široki Brijeg	0–3	Željezničar	Široki Brijeg
20:00		Report	Rodin 39'; Zec 58'; Krpić 60', (yellow card) 77'; Bakrač (red card) 70'	Stadium: Pecara Stadium; Attendance: 2,700; Referee: Dragan Petrović (Banja Luka)

16 September 2018 9	Željezničar	1–0	Radnik	Sarajevo
19:30	Stevanović (yellow card) 17'; Krpić 25'; Ćurjurić (yellow card) 89'	Report	Merajić (yellow card) 51'; Aleksić (yellow card) 73'	Stadium: Grbavica Stadium; Attendance: 4,335; Referee: Luka Bilbija (Prijedor)

23 September 2018 10	Mladost Doboj Kakanj	2–2	Željezničar	Doboj
16:30	Atajić 43'; Anđušić 63'	Report	Zec 57'; Šabanadžović (yellow card) 65'; Dacić 78'	Stadium: MGM Farm Arena; Attendance: 1,500; Referee: Miloš Gigović (Gradiška)

26 September 2018 11	Željezničar	0–0	Sloboda Tuzla	Sarajevo
20:30	Šabanadžović (yellow card) 42'; Pavić (yellow card) 51'	Report	Beganović (yellow card) 34'; Alispahić (yellow card) 55'; Husejinović (yellow card) 67'; Ignjatović (yellow card) 73'	Stadium: Grbavica Stadium; Attendance: 2,568; Referee: Slađan Došlo (East Sarajevo)

30 September 2018 12	Željezničar	1–2	GOŠK Gabela	Sarajevo
19:00	Zec (yellow card) 36'; Krpić 85' (pen.); Bogičević (yellow card) 88'	Report	Đajić 27', (yellow card) 83'; Vego (yellow card) 37'; Aletić (yellow card) 55'; Ramić 90+5' (pen.), (yellow card) 90+5'	Stadium: Grbavica Stadium; Attendance: 2,415; Referee: Sabrija Topalović (Zenica)

5 October 2018 13	Željezničar	3–2	Čelik	Sarajevo
18:00	Zec 26'; Osmanković (yellow card) 33'; Zajmović (yellow card) 39'; Blagojević (yellow card) 56'; E. Šehić (red card) 66'; Rodin 71'; Stevanović (yellow card) 78'; Krpić 82'	Report	Jamak 43'; Okić 67'; Livaja (yellow card) 80'	Stadium: Grbavica Stadium; Attendance: 2,864; Referee: Vladimir Bjelica (East Sarajevo)

20 October 2018 14	Zrinjski	0–1	Željezničar	Mostar
15:00	Rustemović (yellow card) 30'; Jakovljević (yellow card) 68'; Barišić (yellow card) 90+3'	Report	Pavić (yellow card) 57'; Krpić 62'; Šabanadžović (yellow card) 87'	Stadium: Stadion pod Bijelim Brijegom; Attendance: 3,500; Referee: Vladimir Bjelica (East Sarajevo)

28 October 2018 15	Željezničar	0–1	Zvijezda 09	Sarajevo
15:30	Ramović (yellow card) 67'	Report	Huseinbašić (yellow card) 52'; Memović (yellow card) 57'; Jovović 90+4'	Stadium: Grbavica Stadium; Attendance: 1,911; Referee: Mateo Musa (Čitluk)

3 November 2018 16	Sarajevo	2–1	Željezničar	Sarajevo
17:00	Ahmetović 16', 31'; Rahmanović (yellow card) 27'; Tatar (yellow card) 63'; Šabanović (yellow card) 70' (yellow-red card) 89'; Stanojević (yellow card) 78'; Crepulja (yellow card) 90+3'; Dupovac (yellow card) 90+3'	Report	Krpić 19' (pen.); Bakrač (yellow card) 22' (yellow-red card) 24'; Stevanović (yellow card) 90+3'; Osmanković (yellow card) 90+3'	Stadium: Asim Ferhatović Hase Stadium; Attendance: 10,000; Referee: Irfan Peljto (Sarajevo)

11 November 2018 17	Željezničar	2–3	Tuzla City	Sarajevo
16:30	Dženan Osmanović (yellow card) 18'; Jazvić (yellow card) 22', (goal) 31'; Krpić 41'; Zilić (yellow card) 51'	Report	Kostić 20'; Širanović (yellow card) 23'; Čomor (yellow card) 33'; Ubiparip 58'; Nukić (yellow card) 63', (goal) 71'; Mitrović (yellow card) 86'; Fejzić (yellow card) 88'; Šećerović (yellow card) 90'	Stadium: Grbavica Stadium; Attendance: 2260; Referee: Zoran Grbić (Prijedor)

24 November 2018 18	Krupa	2–1	Željezničar	Krupa na Vrbasu
13:00	Crnov 14'; Dujaković (yellow card) 34'; Aganspahić 81'; Kutić (yellow card) 84'; Palić (yellow card) 89'	Report	Veselinović (yellow card) 13'; Osmanković (yellow card) 34'; Čurjurić (yellow card) 58'; Osmanović (yellow card) 60'; Krpić 72'; Bakrač (red card) 84'	Stadium: Stadion FK Krupa; Attendance: 300; Referee: Goran Paradžik (Ljubuški)

2 December 2018 19	Željezničar	2–3	Široki Brijeg	Sarajevo
16:00	Hajdarević 18'; Jazvić 49'; Kjosevski (yellow card) 85'	Report	Matić 2'; Begonja 28'; Marić (yellow card) 70'; Popović (yellow card) 90'	Stadium: Grbavica Stadium; Attendance: 1,500; Referee: Dragan Petrović (Banja Luka)

24 February 2019 20	Radnik	1–0	Željezničar	Bijeljina
14:30	Đurić 5'; Popara (yellow card) 38'; Radović (yellow card) 63'; Lučić (yellow card) 85'	Report	Pavić (yellow card) 21'; Krpić (yellow card) 35'; Bogičević (yellow card) 63'	Stadium: Gradski stadion Attendance: 1,200; Referee: Goran Paradžik (Ljubuški)

3 March 2019 21	Željezničar	2–1	Mladost Doboj Kakanj	Sarajevo
18:00	Veselinović 57'; E. Zec 69', (yellow card) 69'; Ramović (yellow card) 71'; Mujezinović (yellow card) 75'	Report	Guzina 29'; Welbeck (yellow card) 30' (yellow-red card) 32'	Stadium: Grbavica Stadium; Attendance: 4,177; Referee: Zoran Grbić (Prijedor)

9 March 2019 22	Sloboda Tuzla	0–0	Željezničar	Tuzla
17:30	Pršeš (yellow card) 44'; Vukliš (yellow card) 45'; Adžem (yellow card) 54'; Ignjatović (yellow card) 65'; Vidović (yellow card) 73'	Report	Zajmović (yellow card) 45'; Stevanović (yellow card) 69'	Stadium: Tušanj; Attendance: 5,000; Referee: Dragan Petrović (Banja Luka)

17 March 2019 23	Željezničar	1–0	Zvijezda 09	Sarajevo
18:00	Zec 28'	Report	Bašanović (yellow card) 30'; Mišić (yellow card) 52'	Stadium: Grbavica Stadium; Attendance: 3,592; Referee: Slađan Došlo (Istočno Sarajevo)

31 March 2019 24	GOŠK Gabela	1–1	Željezničar	Gabela
16:30	Đajić (yellow card) 11'; Ramić 56' (pen.); Ereiz (yellow card) 65'; Vukoja (yellow card) 79'	Report	E. Zec 31'; Bogičević (yellow card) 65'; Sipović (yellow card) 78'	Stadium: Stadium Perica-Pero Pavlović; Attendance: 1,000; Referee: Luka Bilbija (Prijedor)

6 April 2019 25	Željezničar	0–3	Sarajevo	Sarajevo
19:30	Šabanadžović (yellow card) 77'	Report	Lazić 11'; Velkoski 16'; Tatar (yellow card) 39', (goal) 71'; Crepulja (yellow card) 48'; Stanojević (yellow card) 48'	Stadium: Grbavica Stadium; Attendance: 8,677; Referee: Irfan Peljto (Sarajevo)

13 April 2019 26	Zrinjski	1–0	Željezničar	Mostar
16:30	Čirjak (yellow card) 28'; Pezer 49'; Stanić (yellow card) 38' (yellow-red card) 55'	Report	Sipović (yellow card) 71'; Mujezinović (yellow card) 90+3'	Stadium: Stadion pod Bijelim Brijegom; Attendance: 2,500; Referee: Ermin Sivac (Zenica)

20 April 2019 27	Željezničar	3–0	Krupa	Sarajevo
20:00	Sadiković 30'; E. Zec (yellow card) 30'; Veselinović 33'; Krpić 43'; Ramović (yellow card) 68'	Report		Stadium: Grbavica Stadium; Attendance: 2,702; Referee: Sabrija Topalović (Zenica)

24 April 2019 28	Željezničar	0–0	Široki Brijeg	Sarajevo
20:00	Veselinović (yellow card) 74'; Hajdarević (yellow card) 90'	Report	Yenin (yellow card) 62'	Stadium: Grbavica Stadium; Attendance: 3,012; Referee: Miloš Gigović (Bosanska Gradiška)

27 April 2019 29	Sloboda Tuzla	0–0	Željezničar	Tuzla
20:00	Adžem (yellow card) 8'; Pršeš (yellow card) 58'; Vidović (yellow card) 61'; Ćivić (yellow card) 67'; Beganović (yellow card) 24' (yellow-red card) 71'; Salihović (yellow card) 87'	Report	Sipović (yellow card) 41'; Krpić (yellow card) 67'; Hajdarević (yellow card) 69'	Stadium: Tušanj; Referee: Luka Bilbija (Prijedor)

5 May 2019 30	Željezničar	3–1	Mladost Doboj Kakanj	Sarajevo
20:00	Ramović 45+2'; Rodin 77'; Krpić 83'	Report	Guzina 26'; Asani (yellow card) 13' (yellow-red card) 36'; Biber (yellow card) 17' (yellow-red card) 41'; Arežina (yellow card) 90'	Stadium: Grbavica Stadium; Attendance: 2,110; Referee: Vladimir Bjelica (East Sarajevo)

11 May 2019 31	Radnik	0–1	Željezničar	Bijeljina
17:00	Bečelić (yellow card) 83'	Report	A. Zec 8'; Ramović (yellow card) 12'; Stamić (yellow card) 34'; Stevanović (yellow card) 64'; Šabanadžović (yellow card) 80'; Sadiković (yellow card) 86'	Stadium: Gradski stadion Attendance: 1,000; Referee: Dragan Petrović (Banja Luka)

18 May 2019 32	Željezničar	1–2	Čelik	Sarajevo
17:00	Hajdarević (yellow card) 38'; Krpić (yellow card) 60'; Šabanadžović (yellow card) 65'; E. Zec 84'; Rodin (yellow card) 90+3'	Report	Guluzade (yellow card) 17'; Livaja (yellow card) 24'; Vrhovac 34', (yellow card) 86'; Dilaver 60'; Jurina (yellow card) 64'; Pavlović (yellow card) 76'; Dedić (yellow card) 86'	Stadium: Grbavica Stadium; Attendance: 2,954; Referee: Elvis Mujić (Banovići)

25 May 2019 33	Tuzla City	0–3	Željezničar	Tuzla
17:00		Report	Krpić 22'; Hajdarević 31'; E. Zec 44'; Damir Sadiković (yellow card) 72'; Sipović (yellow card) 77'; A. Zec (yellow card) 90'	Stadium: Tušanj City Stadium; Attendance: 800; Referee: Sabrija Topalović (Zenica)

=== Kup BiH ===
==== Round of 32 ====
19 September 2018	Široki Brijeg	2–0	Željezničar	Široki Brijeg
19:30	Kožul 29'; Kvesić 53'; Matić (yellow card) 88'; Bilobrk (red card) 90+1'	Report	Osmanković (yellow card) 77'; Rodin (yellow card) 85'	Stadium: Pecara Stadium; Attendance: 1,500; Referee: Elvis Mujić (Banovići)

=== UEFA Europa League ===
==== First qualifying round ====
12 July 2018 First leg	Narva Trans (Estonia)	0–2	(Bosnia and Herzegovina) Željezničar	Tallinn, Estonia
18:00		Report	Kotenko 15' (o.g.); Pavić (yellow card) 59'; Šabanadžović 74'	Stadium: A. Le Coq Arena; Attendance: 263; Referee: Daniyar Sakhi (Kazakhstan)

18 July 2018 Second leg	Željezničar (Bosnia and Herzegovina)	3–1 (5–1 agg.)	(Estonia) Narva Trans	Sarajevo, Bosnia and Herzegovina
18:00	Ćurjurić (yellow card) 14'; Zajmović 25'; Krpić 29', 82'	Report	Plotnikov 5'; Barkov (yellow card) 73'	Stadium: Grbavica Stadium; Attendance: 7,603; Referee: Cătălin Gaman (Romania)

==== Second qualifying round ====
26 July 2018 First leg	Željezničar (Bosnia and Herzegovina)	1–2	(Cyprus) Apollon Limassol	Sarajevo, Bosnia and Herzegovina
20:30	Krpić 90'	Report	Bogičević 23' (o.g.); Sachetti 79'	Stadium: Grbavica Stadium; Attendance: 9,268; Referee: Alexander Harkam (Austria)

2 August 2018 Second leg	Apollon Limassol (Cyprus)	3–1 (5–2 agg.)	(Bosnia and Herzegovina) Željezničar	Nicosia, Cyprus
19:00	Papoulis 28', 57' (pen.), 90+'; Roberge (yellow card) 45'; Pereyra (yellow card) 86'	Report	Krpić (yellow card) 27'; Veselinović (yellow card) 34'; Zec 43', (yellow card) 68'; Vranješ (yellow card) 56'	Stadium: GSP Stadium; Referee: Nikola Popov (Bulgaria)
