= Media in Sarajevo =

Sarajevo is a major media centre in Bosnia and Herzegovina.

Communications Regulatory Agency of Bosnia and Herzegovina (www.cra.ba) is responsible for the allocation of broadcasting frequencies in BiH.

== Radio stations ==
In Bosnian language, the original word "Radio" may be replaced by the words "Radio stanica" or "Radio postaja". Almost all radio stations use the RDS and the radio program is available on the Internet, social networks and mobile applications.

=== Analog radio ===
Analog radio stations in Sarajevo area
FM MHz	Name	Type	Transmitter	Headquarters	Web	Notes
87.7	Nes radio	Private	Hum	Banja Luka	www.nesradio.com	
88.2	Radio Vogošća	Public	Grdonj	Vogošća	www.rtvvogosca.com.ba	
88.7	Radio RS	Public	Trebević	Banja Luka	www.rtrs.tv	RTRS
89.5	Radio Ritam Sarajevo	Private	Grdonj	Sarajevo	www.radioritam.ba	Ritam Radio
89.9	Radio ASK	Private	Grdonj	Ilidža	www.radioask.co.ba	
90.2	Radio Sarajevo 90,2	Private	Grdonj	Sarajevo	www.radiosarajevo.ba	
90.5	Radio Mix	Private	Grdonj	Sarajevo	www.radiomix.ba	RSG Group
90.9	Antena Sarajevo	Private	Sedrenik	Sarajevo	www.antena.ba	RSG Group
91.5	Kalman Radio	Private	Sedrenik	Sarajevo	www.kalmanradio.ba	
92.0	BN Radio	Private	Trebević	Bijeljina	www.radiobn.net	RTV BN
93.6	OSM Radio	Private	Trebević	Pale	www.osmtv.com	
95.7	Federalni Radio	Public	Hum	Sarajevo	www.federalna.ba	RTVFBiH
96.1	Radio Mir	Private	Čolina Kapa	Sarajevo	www.radio-medjugorje.com	
96.5	Radio BIR	Private	Grdonj	Sarajevo	www.bir.ba	
97.5	RSG Radio	Private	Sedrenik	Sarajevo	www.radio.rsg.ba	RSG Group
98.1	Radio HB	Public	Čolina Kapa	Mostar	www.rtv-hb.com	RTVHB
98.7	Radio M	Private	Grdonj	Sarajevo	www.radiom.ba	
99.4	Radio BM	Private	Grdonj	Zenica	www.bmradio.net	
99.8	Radio Studio 99	Private	Grdonj	Sarajevo	www.balkans.aljazeera.net	Al Jazeera Balkans
101.2	Radio Kameleon	Private	Grdonj	Sarajevo	www.radiokameleon.ba	
101.7	BH Radio 1	Public	Hum	Sarajevo	www.bhrt.ba	BHRT
102.8	Radio Bobar	Private	Trebević	Bijeljina	www.radiobobar.com	
103.3	Radio Marija	Non-profit	Sedrenik	Sarajevo	www.radiomarija.ba	
103.7	BH Radio 1	Public	Trebević	Sarajevo	www.bhrt.ba	BHRT
104.9	Radio BA	Private	Grdonj	Sarajevo	www.radioba.ba	
105.6	Radio Istočno Sarajevo	Public	Trebević	Istočno Sarajevo	www.is-radio.com	
106.2	Radio Otvorena mreža	Community	Grdonj	Sarajevo	www.otvorenamreza.ba	
106.8	Radio 8	Private	Grdonj	Sarajevo	www.radio8.ba	

=== Defunct radio ===
Defunct radio station in Sarajevo area
FM MHz	Name	Type	Transmitter	Headquarters	Web	Notes
90.5	Radio Vrhbosna	Private	Grdonj	Sarajevo	www.vrhbosna.net	now Radio Mix
95.2	eFM Radio	Private	Grdonj	Sarajevo	www.efm.ba	
89.5	Radio Hayat	Private	Grdonj	Sarajevo	www.radioritam.ba]	now Radio Ritam Sarajevo

== Television ==
=== Analog television ===
The process of digitization is still going on and it is expected to leave the analog frequency bands in 2016.

Analog television channels available in the Sarajevo area
Name	Type	Founded	Headquarters	Owner	Transmission	Web	Notes
BHT 1	Public *	1961	Sarajevo	BHRT	Analog TV	www.bhrt.ba	* TV tax
FTV	Public *	2001	Sarajevo	RTVFBiH	Analog TV	www.federalna.ba	* TV tax
RTRS.tv	Public *	1992	Banja Luka	RTRS	Analog TV	www.rtrs.tv	* TV tax
TVSA	Public	1998	Sarajevo	Sarajevo Canton	Analog TV	www.tvsa.ba	
TV Vogošća	Public	1996	Vogošća		Analog TV	www.rtvvogosca.com.ba	
Hayat	Private	1992	Vogošća		Analog TV	www.hayat.ba	
OBN	Private	1996	Sarajevo		Analog TV	www.obn.ba	
Pink BH	Private	2003	Sarajevo	Pink Media Group	Analog TV	www.pink.co.ba	
Al Jazeera Balkans	Private	2011	Sarajevo	Al Jazeera Media Network	Analog TV	www.balkans.aljazeera.net	
MTV Igman	Private	2000	Pazarić		Analog TV	www.mtvigman.blogspot.ba	
TV Alfa	Private		Sarajevo		Analog TV	www.tvalfa.ba	
Behar TV	Private	2008	Sarajevo		Analog TV	www.behartv.com	
OSM TV	Private	1993	Pale		Analog TV	www.osmtv.com	
RTV Herceg-Bosne	Public	1992	Mostar	RTVHB	Analog TV	www.rtv-hb.com	

=== Cable television ===
Major cable television operators in Sarajevo are Telemach, BH Telecom (Moja TV - IPTV), Logosoft (Super TV - IPTV) and ASK CATV.

Cable television channels based in Sarajevo area
Name	Type	Founded	Headquarters	Owner	Transmission	Web	Notes
Hayat Plus	Private	2003	Vogošća	Hayat	Cable TV	www.hayat.ba	
O Kanal	Private	2010	Sarajevo		Cable TV	www.new.okanal.ba	
Hema TV	Private	2008	Sarajevo		Cable TV	www.hematv.ba	
Hayat Music	Private	2012	Vogošća	Hayat	Cable TV	www.hayat.ba	
Hayat Folk	Private	2012	Vogošća	Hayat	Cable TV	www.hayat.ba	
Face TV	Private	2013	Sarajevo		Cable TV	www.facetv.ba	
Cinema TV	Private	2013	Sarajevo		Cable TV	www.facebook.com/cinematv.bh	
Hayatovci	Private	2014	Vogošća	Hayat	Cable TV	www.hayat.ba	
Pink 2	Private	2014	Sarajevo	Pink Media Group	Cable TV	www.pink.co.ba	
Pink 3 Info	Private	2014	Sarajevo	Pink Media Group	Cable TV	www.pink.co.ba	
Pink Action	Private	2014	Sarajevo	Pink Media Group	Cable TV	www.pink.co.ba	
Pink Bravo Music	Private	2014	Sarajevo	Pink Media Group	Cable TV	www.pink.co.ba	
Pink Classic	Private	2014	Sarajevo	Pink Media Group	Cable TV	www.pink.co.ba	
Pink Comedy	Private	2014	Sarajevo	Pink Media Group	Cable TV	www.pink.co.ba	
Pink Crime & Mystery	Private	2014	Sarajevo	Pink Media Group	Cable TV	www.pink.co.ba	
Pink Erotic 1	Private	2014	Sarajevo	Pink Media Group	Cable TV	www.pink.co.ba	
Pink Erotic 2	Private	2014	Sarajevo	Pink Media Group	Cable TV	www.pink.co.ba	
Pink Erotic 3	Private	2014	Sarajevo	Pink Media Group	Cable TV	www.pink.co.ba	
Pink Erotic 4	Private	2014	Sarajevo	Pink Media Group	Cable TV	www.pink.co.ba	
Pink Erotic 5	Private	2014	Sarajevo	Pink Media Group	Cable TV	www.pink.co.ba	
Pink Erotic 6	Private	2014	Sarajevo	Pink Media Group	Cable TV	www.pink.co.ba	
Pink Erotic 7	Private	2014	Sarajevo	Pink Media Group	Cable TV	www.pink.co.ba	
Pink Erotic 8	Private	2014	Sarajevo	Pink Media Group	Cable TV	www.pink.co.ba	
Pink Extra	Private	2014	Sarajevo	Pink Media Group	Cable TV	www.pink.co.ba	
Pink Family	Private	2014	Sarajevo	Pink Media Group	Cable TV	www.pink.co.ba	
Pink Fashion	Private	2014	Sarajevo	Pink Media Group	Cable TV	www.pink.co.ba	
Pink Fight Network	Private	2014	Sarajevo	Pink Media Group	Cable TV	www.pink.co.ba	
Pink Film	Private	2014	Sarajevo	Pink Media Group	Cable TV	www.pink.co.ba	
Pink Folk	Private	2014	Sarajevo	Pink Media Group	Cable TV	www.pink.co.ba	
Pink Folk 2	Private	2014	Sarajevo	Pink Media Group	Cable TV	www.pink.co.ba	
Pink Hits 1	Private	2014	Sarajevo	Pink Media Group	Cable TV	www.pink.co.ba	
Pink Hits 2	Private	2014	Sarajevo	Pink Media Group	Cable TV	www.pink.co.ba	
Pink Horor	Private	2014	Sarajevo	Pink Media Group	Cable TV	www.pink.co.ba	
Pink Kids	Private	2014	Sarajevo	Pink Media Group	Cable TV	www.pink.co.ba	
Pink Koncert	Private	2014	Sarajevo	Pink Media Group	Cable TV	www.pink.co.ba	
Pink Kuvar	Private	2014	Sarajevo	Pink Media Group	Cable TV	www.pink.co.ba	
Pink Life Style	Private	2014	Sarajevo	Pink Media Group	Cable TV	www.pink.co.ba	
Pink Movies	Private	2014	Sarajevo	Pink Media Group	Cable TV	www.pink.co.ba	
Pink Music	Private	2014	Sarajevo	Pink Media Group	Cable TV	www.pink.co.ba	
Pink Music 2	Private	2014	Sarajevo	Pink Media Group	Cable TV	www.pink.co.ba	
Pink Music 3	Private	2014	Sarajevo	Pink Media Group	Cable TV	www.pink.co.ba	
Pink Music 4	Private	2014	Sarajevo	Pink Media Group	Cable TV	www.pink.co.ba	
Pink Music 5	Private	2014	Sarajevo	Pink Media Group	Cable TV	www.pink.co.ba	
Pink n Roll	Private	2014	Sarajevo	Pink Media Group	Cable TV	www.pink.co.ba	
Pink Parada	Private	2014	Sarajevo	Pink Media Group	Cable TV	www.pink.co.ba	
Pink Pedia	Private	2014	Sarajevo	Pink Media Group	Cable TV	www.pink.co.ba	
Pink Plus	Private	2014	Sarajevo	Pink Media Group	Cable TV	www.pink.co.ba	
Pink Premium	Private	2014	Sarajevo	Pink Media Group	Cable TV	www.pink.co.ba	
Pink Reality	Private	2014	Sarajevo	Pink Media Group	Cable TV	www.pink.co.ba	
Pink Romance	Private	2014	Sarajevo	Pink Media Group	Cable TV	www.pink.co.ba	
Pink Sci Fi & Fantasy	Private	2014	Sarajevo	Pink Media Group	Cable TV	www.pink.co.ba	
Pink Serije	Private	2014	Sarajevo	Pink Media Group	Cable TV	www.pink.co.ba	
Pink Show	Private	2014	Sarajevo	Pink Media Group	Cable TV	www.pink.co.ba	
Pink Soap	Private	2014	Sarajevo	Pink Media Group	Cable TV	www.pink.co.ba	
Pink Super Kids	Private	2014	Sarajevo	Pink Media Group	Cable TV	www.pink.co.ba	
Pink Thriller	Private	2014	Sarajevo	Pink Media Group	Cable TV	www.pink.co.ba	
Pink Western	Private	2014	Sarajevo	Pink Media Group	Cable TV	www.pink.co.ba	
Pink World	Private	2014	Sarajevo	Pink Media Group	Cable TV	www.pink.co.ba	
Pink World Cinema	Private	2014	Sarajevo	Pink Media Group	Cable TV	www.pink.co.ba	
Pink Zabava	Private	2014	Sarajevo	Pink Media Group	Cable TV	www.pink.co.ba	
N1 BiH	Private	2014	Sarajevo	United Media	Cable TV	www.ba.n1info.com	
OBN+	Private	2015	Sarajevo	Televizija OBN	Cable TV	www.obn.ba	
Hema HD	Private	2015	Sarajevo		Cable TV	www.hematv.ba	
M1 FILM	Private	2015	Sarajevo		Cable TV	www.m1film.hr	
M1 GOLD	Private	2015	Sarajevo		Cable TV	www.m1film.hr	
Bosnia Media TV	Private	2016	Sarajevo		Cable TV	www.balkanmedia.ba	

== Print ==
The complete list of magazines and newspapers is available at the website Press Council of BiH (www.vzs.ba).

Publications based in Sarajevo, BiH
Name	Type	Founded	Headquarters	Owner / Publisher	Frequency	Web	Notes
Oslobođenje	Private	30 August 1943; 82 years ago	Sarajevo _{Džemala Bijedića 185; 71000 Sarajevo, BiH}	Oslobođenje d.o.o.	Daily	www.oslobodjenje.ba	Oslobođenje (English: Liberation) was founded in Donja Trnova near Ugljevik, as an anti-nazi newspaper.
Dnevni Avaz	Private	2 October 1993; 32 years ago	Sarajevo _{Tešanjska 24b Avaz Twist Tower; 71000 Sarajevo, BiH}	AVAZ ROTO PRESS d.o.o.	Daily	www.avaz.ba	Dnevni Avaz (English: Daily voice) evolved from a monthly publication Bošnjački Avaz. Avaz is part of the Avaz publishing house, the biggest news house in Bosnia and Herzegovina.
Faktor	Private	12 November 2015; 10 years ago	Sarajevo _{Fra Anđela Zvizdovića 1 UNITIC Tower; 71000 Sarajevo, BiH}	Simurg Media d.o.o.	Daily	www.faktor.ba	With the slogan Factor - the newspaper you want - Faktor (English: Factor) emerged from its own web portal. The company Simurg media also issues a political magazine called Stav.
Službeni List Bosne i Hercegovine	Government gazette	20 June 1945; 80 years ago	Sarajevo _{Džemala Bijedića 39/III; 71000 Sarajevo, BiH}	Javno preduzeće Novinsko-izdavačka organizacija SLUŽBENI LIST BOSNE I HERCEGOVINE.		www.sluzbenilist.ba	
Magazin Dani	Private		Sarajevo _{Džemala Bijedića 185; 71000 Sarajevo, BiH}	Oslobođenje d.o.o.	Weekly (Fridays)	www.bhdani.ba	(English: Days) - political news magazine also known as BH Dani
Magazin Start	Private		Sarajevo _{La Benevolencije 6; 71000 Sarajevo, BiH}		Monthly	www.startbih.info	Political news magazine.
Preporod	Private	15 June 1970; 55 years ago	Sarajevo _{Gazi Husrev-begova; 71000 Sarajevo, BiH}		Weekly	www.preporod.com	(English: Revival) - Islamic informative newspapers
Magazin Stav	Private		Sarajevo _{Fra Anđela Zvizdovića 1 UNITIC Tower; 71000 Sarajevo, BiH}	Simurg Media d.o.o.	Weekly	www.faktor.ba	(English: Attitude) - political magazine
Sport Avaz	Private		Sarajevo _{Tešanjska 24b Avaz Twist Tower; 71000 Sarajevo, BiH}	AVAZ ROTO PRESS d.o.o.	Weekly (Tuesdays and Fridays)	www.sportavaz.ba	Sports magazine known as Sport Avazov
Azra Magazin	Private		Sarajevo _{Tešanjska 24b Avaz Twist Tower; 71000 Sarajevo, BiH}	AVAZ ROTO PRESS d.o.o.	Weekly (Wednesdays)	www.azramag.ba	Women's magazine.
Express Magazin	Private		Sarajevo _{Tešanjska 24b Avaz Twist Tower; 71000 Sarajevo, BiH}	AVAZ ROTO PRESS d.o.o.	Weekly (Thursdays)	www.expressmag.ba	Show biz tabloid.
Magazin Bebe&Mame	Private		Sarajevo _{Tešanjska 24b Avaz Twist Tower; 71000 Sarajevo, BiH}	AVAZ ROTO PRESS d.o.o.	Monthly	www.bebeimame.ba	The first Bosnian educational magazine for parents.
Azra Family	Private		Sarajevo _{Tešanjska 24b Avaz Twist Tower; 71000 Sarajevo, BiH}	AVAZ ROTO PRESS d.o.o.	Monthly	www.azramag.ba	Magazine for the whole family.
Magzin Gracija	Private	2005	Sarajevo _{Skenderpašina 4; 71000 Sarajevo, BiH}	GRACIJA-PRESS d.o.o.	Monthly	www.gracija.ba	The first BH magazine for the modern woman.
Srce i šećer	Private		Sarajevo _{Tešanjska 24b Avaz Twist Tower; 71000 Sarajevo, BiH}	AVAZ ROTO PRESS d.o.o.	Monthly	www.azramag.ba	Magazine for the whole family.
Maxi Magazin	Private	2002	Sarajevo _{Titova 30; 71000 Sarajevo, BiH}	MAXI PRESS	Monthly	www.maxistars.ba	Magazine with the latest social, fashion, music, film sports events.

== News agencies ==
News agencies based in Sarajevo, BiH
Name	Type	Founded	Headquarters	Owner	Web	Notes
FENA	Public		Sarajevo _{Ćemaluša 1; 71000 Sarajevo, BiH}	Federation of Bosnia and Herzegovina	www.fena.ba www.fena.co.ba	Federalna novinska agencija; FENA (English: Federal News Agency )
ONASA	Private		Sarajevo _{Zmaja od Bosne 4; 71000 Sarajevo, BiH}	ONASA	www.onasa.com.ba	Nezavisna novinska agencija iz Sarajeva - ONASA; (English: Independent news agency from Sarajevo - ONASA)
MINA	Private		Sarajevo _{Zelenih beretki 17; 71000 Sarajevo, BiH}	Islamic Community of Bosnia and Herzegovina	www.rijaset.ba	Muslimanska informativna novinska agencija; MINA (English: Muslim informative news agency)
KTA BK BiH	Private		Sarajevo _{Kaptol 32; 71000 Sarajevo, BiH}	Bishops' Conference of Bosnia and Herzegovina	www.ktabkbih.net	Katolička tiskovna agencija Biskupske konferencije Bosne i Hercegovine; (English: Catholic news agency of the Bishops' Conference of Bosnia and Herzegovina)
AA	Public		Sarajevo _{Zelenih beretki 17; 71000 Sarajevo, BiH}	Anadolu Agency BiH	www.aa.com.tr/ba	Agencija Anadolija; AA BiH
NAP	Private		Sarajevo _{Zmaja od Bosne 16; 71000 Sarajevo, BiH}	NAP	www.nap.ba	Bh. novinska agencija Patria; Patria (English: Bh. News agency Patria)

== See also ==
- List of radio stations in Bosnia and Herzegovina
- Television in Bosnia and Herzegovina
