= Alem (name) =

Alem is both a surname and a given name. Notable people with the name include:

== Surname ==
- Leandro Alem, Argentine politician
- Raja'a Alem, Saudi Arabian novelist
- Kangni Alem, Togolese writer
- Mizan Alem, Ethiopian long-distance runner
- Shadia Alem, Saudi Arabian visual artist

== Given name ==
- Alem Tsahai Iyasu, Ethiopian princess
- Alem Koljić, Bosnian-Herzegovinian footballer
- Alem Marr, American politician
- Alem Merajić, Bosnian professional footballer
- Alem Mujaković, Slovenian footballer
- Telmo Além da Silva, Brazilian footballer
- Alem Zewde Tessema, Ethiopian military figure
- Alem Toskić, Serbian handball player

== Other ==
- Alem (beatboxer), French beatboxer
- Avigdor Glogauer (1725–1810), also known as Avigdor Levi and by the acronym Alem, was a German Jewish grammarian and poet.
