= Arežina =

Arežina is a surname. Notable people with the surname include:

- Milan Arežina (born 1960), Yugoslav rower
- Filip Arežina (born 1991), Bosnian footballer
