= Vrhbosna (disambiguation) =

Vrhbosna was the medieval name of a region that is now part of Sarajevo, Bosnia and Herzegovina.

Vrhbosna may also refer to:

- Roman Catholic Archdiocese of Vrhbosna, the Roman Catholic Archdiocese in Bosnia and Herzegovina
- Radio Vrhbosna, a radio station in Bosnia and Herzegovina
- Grand County of Vrhbosna, an administrative unit in the Independent State of Croatia (1941-1945)
