= Radiosarajevo.ba =

- Website type: News media
- Available in: Bosnian language
- Owners: Zid d.o.o., Sarajevo.
- Editor: Emir Aletić (Editor in chief)
- Commercial: Yes
- Registration: optional
- Current status: Online

Radiosarajevo.ba is a popular web portal in Bosnia and Herzegovina. It was founded in 2004 as web portal for newly established commercial radio station in Sarajevo, Radio Sarajevo 90.2.

Former Radio Zid - Sarajevo (89.9 FM MHz) changed its name to current Radio Sarajevo).

The new name of the portal and the radio station reminds of the history of the former national public radio station in Bosnia and Herzegovina, 1945–1992, called Radio Sarajevo. Today, its legal successor is national public broadcasting service, BHRT via BH Radio 1.

== See also ==
- Radio Sarajevo
- Radio Sarajevo 90,2
- Media in Sarajevo
- Media of Bosnia and Herzegovina
