= Hayatovci =

Children's television channel in Bosnia and Herzegovina

- Broadcast area: Bosnia and Herzegovina
- Network: Hayat TV
- Headquarters: Jošanička 55 Vogošća (WOG Centar)

Programming
- Language: Bosnian language
- Picture format: 16:9 1080i (HDTV)

Ownership
- Owner: HAYAT društvo za proizvodnju i emitovanje televizijskog programa d.o.o. Sarajevo
- Key people: Elvir Švrakić
- Sister channels: Hayat TV; Hayat Plus; Hayat Music; Hayat Folk

History
- Launched: 15 May 2014

Links
- Website: www.hayat.ba/hayatovci

Hayatovci is the first specialized children's TV channel in Bosnia and Herzegovina. The program name comes from the popular children's TV show Hayatovci that originally aired on Hayat TV. The headquarters of TV channel is located in Vogošća (near Sarajevo).

The program is produced in the Bosnian language. The channel's programming is dedicated to children aged 6 to 12 years and it usually consists of both natively Bosnian and dubbed (non-violent) cartoons and educational programs.

Hayatovci is available via cable systems throughout the Bosnia and Herzegovina and former Yugoslavia, Balkan countries or worldwide via exclusive IPTV platforms offering a special Hayat TV package (with Hayat TV, Hayat Plus, Hayat Music and Hayat Folk).
