= Jamila Abitar =

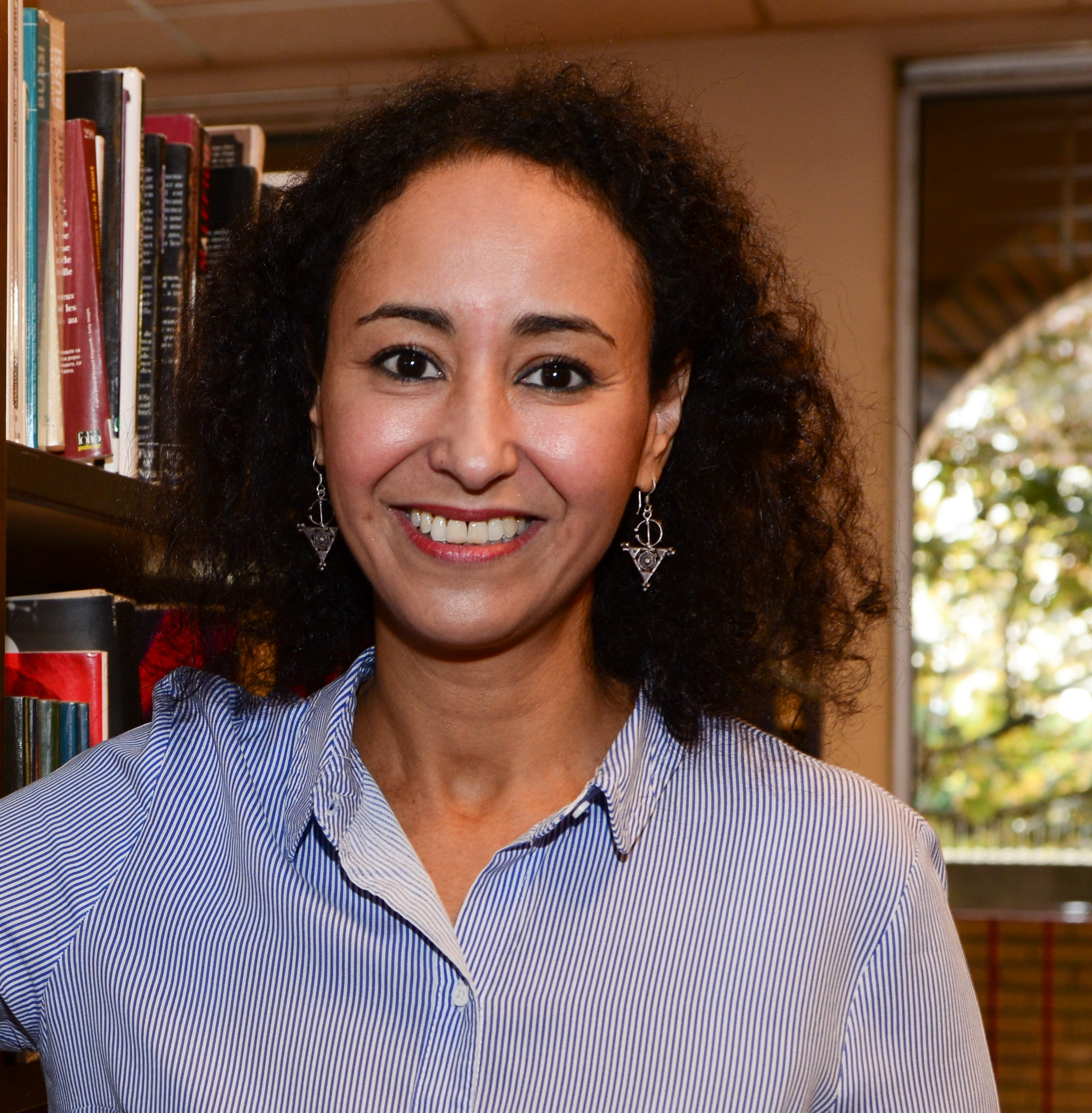
French-Moroccan poet Jamila Abitar

Jamila Abitar (in Arabic: جميلة أبطار), born May 9, 1969 in Marrakech, is a Franco-Moroccan poet living in France.

== Biography ==
Discovered by the poet Léopold Congo-Mbemba, Jamila Abitar published her first collection of poems L'Aube sous les dunes in 2000 (éditions L'Harmattan), then L'Oracle des fellah in 2001.

She studied law and worked in university administrative services and for UNESCO. She was then put in charge of the three libraries in the town of Cachan (Val-de-Marne).

== Participations and artistic activities ==
Jamila Abitar participates in poetry events in France and in Morocco, including the inaugural conference of the Maison de la Poésie hosted by Mohammed Achaari on the theme “poetry and the other”

Despite leaving Marrakesh, she often composed a collection of poems about it, such as À Marrakech, derrière la Koutoubia, a work praised by the French poet and philosopher Philippe Étancelin.

Her poems have been translated into several languages, including Romanian and Icelandic.

== Publications ==
L'Oracle des fellahs, L’Harmattan editions, Paris, 2001; preface by Chekib Abdessalam.
