= Alem (disambiguation) =

Alem is a town in the Dutch province of Gelderland.

Alem may also refer to:

== People ==
- Alem (name), both a surname and a given name
- Alem (beatboxer)
- Além (footballer), Angolan footballer

== Places ==
- Ålem, a locality in Kalmar county, Sweden
- Além, a village in the Portuguese province of Norte

== Other ==
- Alem (Ferris wheel), at Alem Cultural and Entertainment Center, Ashgabat, Turkmenistan
- Alem (finial), the decorative top of a minaret, or Ottoman military standard
