= The Dove's Necklace =

Saudi 2010 fiction novel

- Author: Raja'a Alem
- Language: Arabic
- Genre: Novel
- Publisher: Arab Cultural Center in Casablanca
- Publication date: 2010

The Dove's Necklace is a novel written by Saudi writer Raja'a Alem. The novel was first released in 2010 by the Arab Cultural Center in Casablanca. She was jointly awarded the 2011 International Prize for Arabic Fiction.

== The novel ==
The Dove's Necklace is a Hejazi novel set in Mecca. The reality of this novel is an organic mix of history, current state, fiction or fantasy; the characters of the novel are a combination of people with flesh, blood and others are fictional; and the main narrator is neither the writer nor one of the human characters in her novel, but it is the street of "Abu-Russians" in "Old Mecca", where most of her characters reside.
