= Hayat Plus =

- Country: Bosnia and Herzegovina (BiH)
- Broadcast area: BiH and worldwide
- Network: Hayat TV
- Headquarters: Jošanička 55 Vogošća (WOG Centar)

Programming
- Language(s): Bosnian language
- Picture format: 16:9 1080i (HDTV)

Ownership
- Owner: HAYAT društvo za proizvodnju i emitovanje televizijskog programa d.o.o. Sarajevo
- Key people: Elvir Švrakić
- Sister channels: Hayat TV; Hayatovci; Hayat Music; Hayat Folk

History
- Launched: 1 January 2006
- Former names: NTV Hayat SAT (1 November 2002 - 1 January 2006)

Links
- Website: www.hayat.ba/plus

Hayat Plus or Hayat PLUS is a Bosnian satellite television channel operated by Hayat TV. The headquarters of the TV channel are located in Vogošća (near Sarajevo). The program is produced in the Bosnian language, and programming is dedicated to the Bosnian diaspora.

The program has been broadcasting since 2002 (formerly known as NTV Hayat SAT). The program consists of a variety of reportages about the life of Bosnians in Australia, the United States, and Europe, and it is made by direct contact with people in the diaspora. The most significant TV shows from the Hayat TV production are adjusted for people in other time zones, without commercials and interruptions. Hayat Plus cooperates with local TV stations in Bosnia and Herzegovina (BiH) and often broadcast their weekly chronicle.

Hayat Plus is available via cable systems throughout BiH and the former Yugoslavia (Balkan countries). Hayat Plus is part of a special Hayat TV package (with Hayat TV, Hayatovci, Hayat Music and Hayat Folk). A worldwide channel is available via the Eutelsat satellite provider.

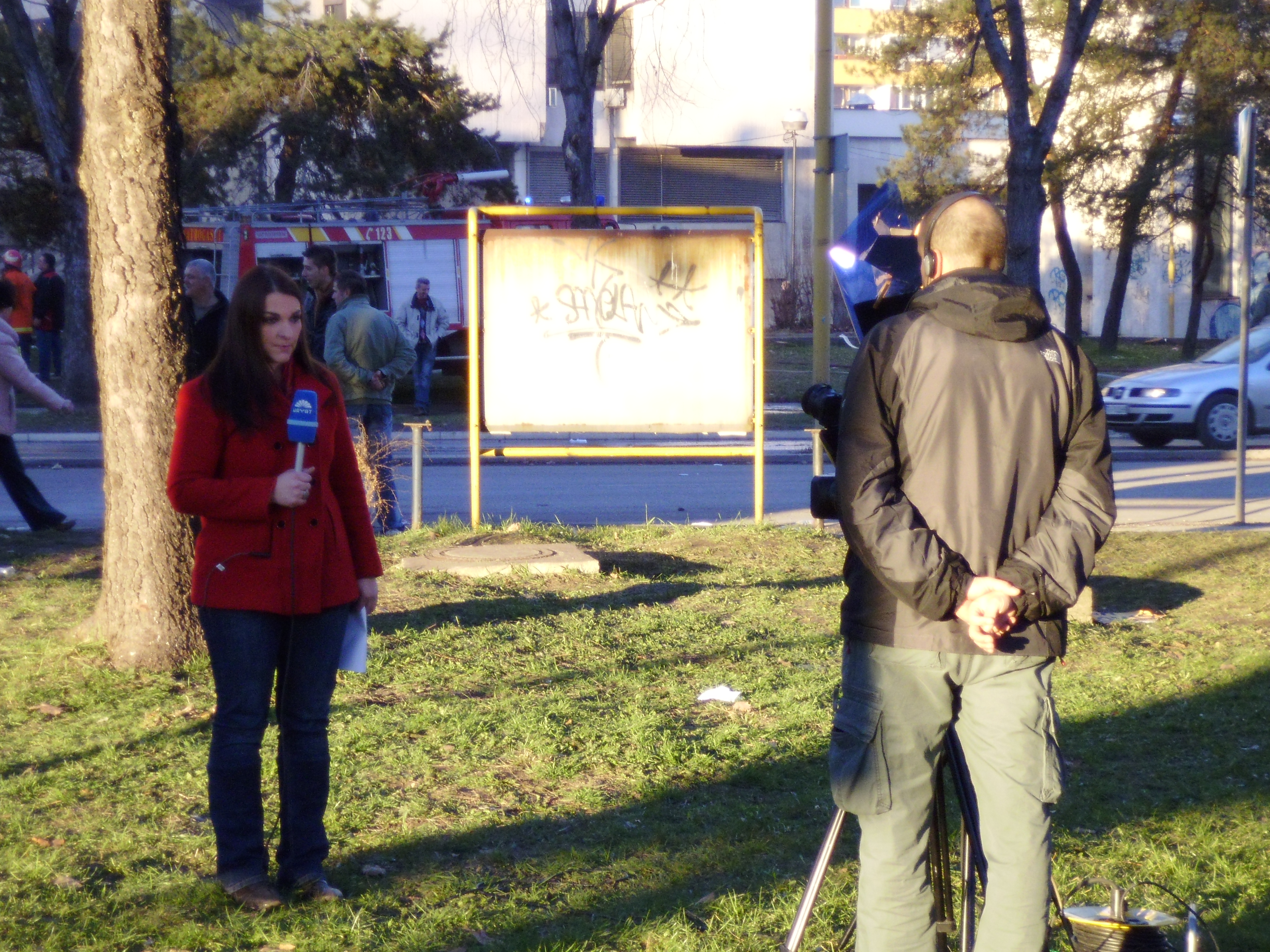
A Hayat TV reporter outside of the burning government building of Tuzla Canton
