= Radio Ritam =

Bosnian commercial radio group

- Company type: LLC (Private)
- Industry: Broadcasting
- Headquarters: Sarajevo, Bosnia and Herzegovina
- Area served: Bosnia and Herzegovina
- Products: Radio Ritam Sarajevo; Radio Ritam Banja Luka; Radio Ritam Zenica; Radio Ritam Visoko; Radio Ritam Mostar
- Website: www.radioritam.ba

Radio Ritam is a Bosnian commercial radio group, consisting of five radio stations in Bosnia and Herzegovina. This group includes the following radio stations: Radio Ritam Sarajevo, Radio Ritam Banja Luka, Radio Ritam Zenica, Radio Ritam Visoko and Radio Ritam Mostar.

== See also ==
- List of radio stations in Bosnia and Herzegovina
