= Miloš Bakrač =

Montenegrin footballer

Personal information
- Date of birth: 25 February 1992 (age 34)
- Place of birth: Plužine, FPR Yugoslavia
- Height: 1.88 m (6 ft 2 in)
- Position: Centre-back

Team information
- Current team: SCM Zalău
- Number: 25

Youth career
- 2010–2011: OFK Beograd

Senior career*
Years	Team	Apps	(Gls)
2012	Sion	3	(0)
2012–2016	Sion U21	49	(1)
2014–2015	→ Budućnost Podgorica (loan)	21	(2)
2016	Travnik	1	(0)
2016–2018	Sutjeska Nikšić	75	(5)
2018–2019	Željezničar Sarajevo	10	(0)
2019	OFK Titograd	13	(0)
2019–2020	Zira	11	(0)
2021–2022	FK Iskra Danilovgrad	46	(2)
2022–2024	FK Rudar	50	(0)
2024–	SCM Zalău	0	(0)

International career
2010–2011	Montenegro U19	8	(1)
2011–2014	Montenegro U21	11	(0)
2018	Montenegro	1	(0)
- * Club domestic league appearances and goals as of 14:18, 30 October 2024 (UTC)

Miloš Bakrač (Montenegrin: Милош Бакрач; born 25 February 1992) is a Montenegrin professional footballer who plays as a centre-back for SCM Zalău in the Liga III. He made one appearance for the Montenegro national team in 2018.

== Club career ==
Bakrač moved to Serbian side OFK Beograd in 2010 and played mostly in the youth team.

He made his league debut on 10 August 2013 in a Swiss Super League match against Grasshopper Club.

On 29 July 2014, he transferred to Budućnost Podgorica.

After Budučnost, he also played at Travnik in 2016 and Sutjeska Nikšić from 2016 to 2018 with whom he won the Montenegrin League in 2018 and the Montenegrin Cup in 2017.

In June 2018, he signed for Premier League of Bosnia and Herzegovina club FK Željezničar Sarajevo. On 11 January 2019, he left Željezničar.

On 14 February 2019, Bakrač became the new player of Montenegrin First League club OFK Titograd.

== International career ==
Bakrač represented Montenegro on various youth levels.

On 2 June 2018, he made his official international A team debut for Montenegro, in a 2–0 friendly game loss to Slovenia coming in as a substitute.

== Career statistics ==
=== Club ===
As of match played 2 December 2018

Appearances and goals by club, season and competition
Club	Season	League			National cup (Note: Includes Swiss Cup, Montenegrin Cup)		Continental		Total	
Club	Season	Division	Apps	Goals	Apps	Goals	Apps	Goals	Apps	Goals
Sion	2012–13	Swiss Super League	1	0	—		—		1	0
Sion	2013–14	Swiss Super League	2	0	1	0	—		3	0
Sion	Total		3	0	1	0	—		4	0
Budućnost	2014–15	Montenegrin First League	6	1	1	0	0	0	7	1
Travnik	2015–16	First League of FBiH	1	0	—		—		1	0
Sutjeska Nikšić	2016–17	Montenegrin First League	32	2	4	0	—		36	2
Sutjeska Nikšić	2017–18	Montenegrin First League	30	2	2	0	2 (Note: Appearances in UEFA Europa League)	0	34	3
Sutjeska Nikšić	Total		62	4	6	0	2	0	70	4
Željezničar	2018–19	Bosnian Premier League	10	0	0	0	4	0	14	0
OFK Titograd	2018–19	Montenegrin First League	0	0	—		—		0	0
Career total			81	5	8	0	6	0	95	5

=== International ===
As of match played 2 June 2018

Appearances and goals by national team and year
National team	Year	Apps	Goals
Montenegro
Montenegro	2018	1	0
Total		1	0

== Honours ==
Sutjeska Nikšić

- Montenegrin First League: 2017–18
- Montenegrin Cup: 2016–17
