= The Arch and the Butterfly =

2010 novel by Mohammed Achaari

- Author: Mohammed Achaari
- Language: Arabic
- Publisher: Publisher Arab Cultural Center
- Publication date: 2010
- Pages: 335

The Arch and the Butterfly (Ar: قوس والفراشة) is a novel by Moroccan author Mohammed Achaari first published in Arabic in 2010 and translated into English by Aida Bamia in 2014. It is considered an extension of the author's first novel, South of the Spirit, because it re-enacts the clan. The work, awarded the International Prize for Arabic Fiction (2011), explores themes of alienation, memory, extremism, and the boundaries between life and death through the transformations of three generations of the Moroccan family of the Fersiwi family.

== Plot ==
The novel tells the story of the Al-Farsawi dynasty, a humble family from the countryside coming from Boumandara to the town of Zarhoun. In this sense, the novel depicts the fate of successive generations.

=== First generation ===
The story begins with Muhammad al-Farsiwi, the grandfather who spent 20 years in Germany, during which he discovered German poetry. After that, he decided to return home with his German wife Diotima, whose name refers to the name of the wife of the German poet Hölderlin, hoping to restore the glories of his Berber ancestors. He loses his sight in a traffic accident and becomes a blind guide for tourists in the city of Volubilis.

=== Second generation ===
Youssef Al-Farsawi, the son of Muhammad, represents the second generation. He lived in Germany for an important period, returned to his country and became active in politics, after which he was imprisoned in Kenitra prison due to his involvement in a leftist movement. Youssef works as a journalist and writes a column for a left-wing party newspaper and articles in specialized magazines. He has literary talents, moves between bars and airports, writes letters to his lover, and continues his search for the truth, especially the fact that his mother was killed, who some claim committed suicide.

Youssef's is disappointed with life, from the marital relationship that lacked love, and from the society that disintegrated due to the dominance of capital and illegal speculation, and the urban development that lacks beauty, spirit and imagination.

=== Third generation ===
The grandson Yassin represents the third generation of the Al-Farsawi family. He studied in the Architecture Division in France, then decides to join the Taliban movement in Afghanistan. He's killed in an attempt to save a friend from blowing himself up, so they exploded together, and the story of Al Persian.

== Reception ==
The novel was preoccupied with the topics surrounding the Moroccan scene of bribery, bureaucracy, corruption, and power, which gave it a political tinge.

The author's affiliation to the leftist orientation gave the novel a dark character with regard to his criticism of the society, which fears the deviation of their children (smoking, crime, violence...), and in return he cannot imagine that his son may become obscurantist and suicidal, according to the author's belief and analysis.

The novel was nominated for the International Prize for Arabic Fiction for the year 2011, and the novel received the award, along with the novel The Pigeon Ring by Saudi Arabia, Raja Alem, in a competition for the award, which has been awarded to one winner since its establishment.
