= Raja'a Alem =

Saudi Arabian novelist (born 1970)

- رجاء عالم
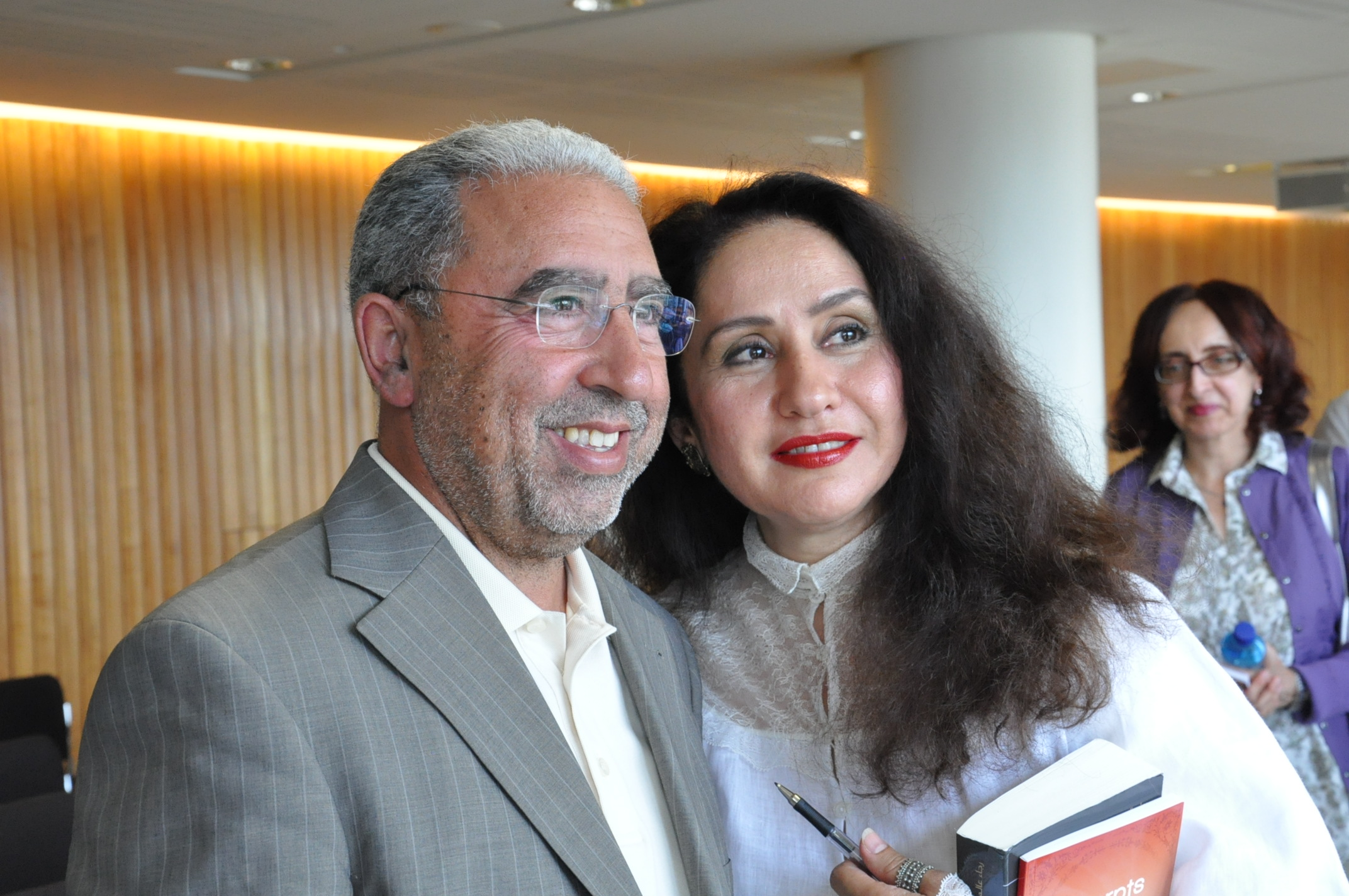
- Mohammed Achaari with Raja'a Alem at the 2011 London Literature Festival
- Born: 1970 (age 55–56); Mecca
- Writing career
- Genre: novel
- Notable awards: 2011 International Prize for Arabic Fiction

Raja'a Alem (Arabic: رجاء عالم; born in 1956) is a Saudi Arabian novelist from Mecca/Hejaz. She studied English Literature at King Abdulaziz University in Jeddah in 1980. She began her writing career on the "Letters and Ideas" page in Al-Riyadh newspaper, as well as in the newspaper's weekly supplement. She is credited with documenting the Meccan/Hejazi environment in her novels. Her novels are distinguished by a symbolic Sufi/Gnostic narrative with broad cosmic visions. Some of her works have been translated into English and Spanish.

== Life ==
Alem was born in Mecca. She received her BA in English Literature and works as a tutor for the Center for Training Kindergarten Teachers in Jeddah, Saudi Arabia. She is an active writer of prose and her style, a blend of modern style with traditional themes, is unique among Saudi authors. Alem has published several plays, three novels, and a collection of short stories, Nahr al-Hayawan (The Animal River, 1994). She is the recipient of several prestigious international prizes.

Her short story "One Thousand Braids and a Governess" has been translated into English and published in Voices of Change: short stories by Saudi Arabian women writers. Her birth in Mecca and her family background is highly influential to her work and outlook. She has reflected on her relationship with the now overhauled and renovated city of Mecca, saying:

I belong to a stream of thinking rather than a piece of land, to a current that runs everywhere. My country is all over the globe...Now, in Mecca, I felt I belonged, not to the ceremonies performed by thousands of bodies but to a spirit that was reaching out to me alone. I somehow felt that I was seeing beyond things, past the glare of the full moon, feeling the elation you experience when you reach the power behind things. Or maybe it was about the way the moonlight mingled with the longings of the pilgrims.

Some of her works in Arabic have been banned. Writing in English was a significant decision for Alem. She has said:

"The fact is that my people are drifting away from their own culture, and many of them no longer have a clue about what I'm writing about. So I find myself looking for new ways to communicate, for other languages, and English was the first one that came to hand...'Coming out' in another language is a way of shedding inhibitions. All the things that made me feel ashamed lost their morbid grip on me and became acceptable. I’ve never read any of my books published in Arabic; it makes me feel completely naked. Reading them in another language, though, I feel alive in a poetic way."

Among her significant works are the books Khatam, Sayidi Wehadana, Masra Ya Rageeb, Hubba, The Silk Road, and other novels. She divides her time between Jeddah and Paris.

== 2011 International Prize for Arabic Fiction ==
Alem was joint winner of the 2011 International Prize for Arabic Fiction for her novel The Doves' Necklace. This renowned prize is administered by the Booker Prize Foundation in London, and is funded by Department of Culture and Tourism, Abu Dhabi (DCT). She shared the prize with the Moroccan writer Mohammed Achaari.

== Works ==
- ثقوب في الظهر (Thouqoub fi el-dahr) Beyrouth: Dar al Adab, 2006. OCLC 822666376
- ستر (Sitr) Beyrouth : Dar al Adab, 2006. OCLC 822666398
- الرقص على سن الشوكة (Al-raqs ala sinn al-shouka) Beyrouth: Dar al Adab, 2006. OCLC 822652972
- طريق الحرير (Tariq al-harir) Beyrouth : Dar al Adab, 2006. OCLC 822666564
- خاتم (Khatim) Beyrouth : Dar al-bayda, 2006. OCLC 822666506

== Venice Biennale ==
In 2011, Alem represented Saudi Arabia with her sister, the artist Shadia Alem at the Venice Biennale. This was the first time that Saudi Arabia had entered the festival. Their work was entitled The Black Arch and referenced travel narratives, Hajj and the representation of women.
