= Radio Mix =

- Sarajevo; Bosnia and Herzegovina
- Broadcast area: Bosnia and Herzegovina
- Frequencies: Travnik 88.3 MHz; Konjic 89.1 MHz; Sarajevo 90.5 MHz; Zenica 95.4 MHz; Banja Luka 95.9 MHz; Tuzla 103.4 MHz; Tešanj 105.3 MHz; Mostar 107.1 MHz

Programming
- Language: Bosnian language
- Format: Variety, pop-folk music, news
- Affiliations: RSG Group

Ownership
- Owner: "Radio Mix" d.o.o. Sarajevo
- Sister stations: RSG Radio; Antena Sarajevo

History
- First air date: 18 May 2016 as Radio Mix
- Call sign meaning: RADIO MIX

Technical information
- Transmitter coordinates: 43°52′N 18°25′E

Links
- Website: www.radiomix.ba

Radio Mix is a Bosnian commercial radio station, broadcasting from Sarajevo.

== History and programming ==
Radio Mix was founded on 18 May 2016 when RSG Group bought the frequency from Radio Vrhbosna. Radio Mix is formatted as a variety radio service that broadcasts greatest pop and folk hits, talk shows and short news.

The program is currently broadcast at one frequency (Sarajevo 90.5 MHz), estimated number of potential listeners is around 426,581. Radio Mix is part of the informal media group in the radio market of Bosnia and Herzegovina called RSG Group.

RSG Group consists of three radio programs RSG Radio, Antena Sarajevo and Radio Mix, marketing agency and production – Netra, radio news production services – Media servis, and Web portals www.rsg.ba and www.antena.ba..

== Frequencies ==
The program is currently broadcast on 7 frequencies:

- Sarajevo 90.5 MHz
- Travnik 88.3 MHz
- Zenica 95.4 MHz
- Banja Luka 95.9 MHz
- Tešanj 105.3 MHz
- Mostar 107.1 MHz
- Tuzla 103.4 MHz
- Konjic 89.1 MHz

== See also ==
- List of radio stations in Bosnia and Herzegovina
