= Muamer Adžem =

Bosnian footballer (born 1992)

Personal information
- Date of birth: 1 November 1992 (age 34)
- Place of birth: Goražde, Bosnia and Herzegovina
- Height: 1.94 m (6 ft 4 in)
- Position: Centre-back

Youth career
- –2012: Goražde

Senior career*
Years	Team	Apps	(Gls)
2012–2015	Goražde	44	(5)
2015–2016	FC Hepberg		
2016–2017	Goražde	22	(1)
2017–2018	Zvijezda Gradačac	26	(2)
2018–2019	Sloboda Tuzla	28	(0)
2019–2020	Goražde	15	(0)
2020	Olimpik	7	(1)
- * Club domestic league appearances and goals as of 26 September 2020

Muamer Adžem (born 1 November 1992) is a Bosnian professional footballer who plays as a centre-back.

== Career ==
Adžem started off his career at hometown club Goražde for who he played from 2012 to 2015, before signing for German low tier club Hepberg.

After one year in Germany, Adžem came back to Bosnia and Herzegovina and returned to Goražde where he stayed for one season. In 2017, he joined First League of FBiH club Zvijezda Gradačac for who he was a regular for the whole 2017–18 First League of FBiH season.

In June 2018, Adžem signed with Bosnian Premier League club Sloboda Tuzla. He made his debut for Sloboda on 5 August 2018, in a 1–0 home league loss against Sarajevo, coming in as a 57th-minute substitute for Omar Pršeš and was a first team regular at the club. He left Sloboda after his contract with the club expired with the end of the 2018–19 season.

In August 2019, Adžem came back for a second time and signed a contract with Goražde. He played his first match since his return to Goražde on 10 August 2019, in a 2–1 home league win against Metalleghe-BSI.

In January 2020, Adžem left Goražde again, this time joining Olimpik. He made his official debut for Olimpik on 4 March 2020, in a quarter-finals game of the 2019–20 Bosnian Cup against Široki Brijeg in which Olimpik drew 1–1, but later lost in a penalty shootout. On 26 May 2020, the 2019–20 First League of FBiH season ended abruptly due to the ongoing COVID-19 pandemic in Bosnia and Herzegovina and, by default, Adžem with Olimpik were crowned league champions and got promoted back to the Bosnian Premier League. On 7 July 2020, he extended his contract with Olimpik. Adžem scored his first goal for Olimpik in a league game against Velež Mostar on 12 September 2020. He unexpectedly left the club on 2 October 2020.

== Career statistics ==
As of match played 26 September 2020.

Appearances and goals by club, season and competition
Club	Season	League			Cup		Continental		Total	
Club	Season	Division	Apps	Goals	Apps	Goals	Apps	Goals	Apps	Goals
Goražde	2012–13	First League of FBiH	17	2	—		—		17	2
Goražde	2013–14	Second League of FBiH - Center	15	2	—		—		15	2
Goražde	2014–15	First League of FBiH	12	1	0	0	—		12	1
Goražde	2016–17	First League of FBiH	22	1	3	0	—		25	1
Goražde	Total		66	6	3	0	—		69	6
Zvijezda Gradačac	2017–18	First League of FBiH	26	2	—		—		26	2
Sloboda Tuzla	2018–19	Bosnian Premier League	28	0	0	0	—		28	0
Goražde	2019–20	First League of FBiH	15	0	0	0	—		15	0
Olimpik	2019–20	First League of FBiH	0	0	1	0	—		1	0
Olimpik	2020–21	Bosnian Premier League	7	1	0	0	—		7	1
Olimpik	Total		7	1	1	0	—		8	1
Career total			142	9	4	0	—		146	9

== Honours ==
Goražde

- Second League of FBiH: 2013–14 (Center)

Olimpik

- First League of FBiH: 2019–20
