= Ivan Čurjurić =

Croatian footballer

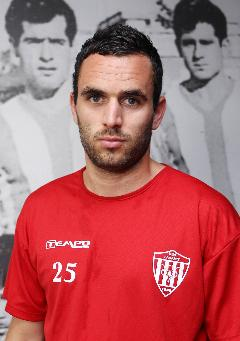
- Čurjurić with Nea Salamis Famagusta in 2013

Personal information
- Full name: Ivan Čurjurić
- Date of birth: 29 September 1989 (age 37)
- Place of birth: Zadar, SFR Yugoslavia
- Height: 1.74 m (5 ft 9 in)
- Position: Attacking midfielder

Team information
- Current team: HNK Zadar
- Number: 10

Youth career
- –2006: Zadar
- 2006–2007: Dinamo Zagreb
- 2007–2008: Hajduk Split

Senior career*
Years	Team	Apps	(Gls)
2008–2009	Hajduk Split	1	(0)
2009–2013	Zadar	76	(9)
2013	Zagreb	10	(1)
2013–2014	Nea Salamis Famagusta	30	(3)
2014–2015	PAS Lamia	1	(0)
2015	Ayia Napa	15	(3)
2015–2017	Nea Salamis Famagusta	55	(7)
2017–2018	Poli Timișoara	11	(0)
2018	Enosis Neon Paralimni	14	(2)
2018–2019	Željezničar	18	(1)
2019–2020	Zrinjski Mostar	33	(4)
2021	Olimpik	11	(0)
2021-2022	Valletta	24	(3)
2022-	HNK Zadar		
- * Club domestic league appearances and goals as of 21 March 2021

Ivan Čurjurić (born 29 September 1989) is a Croatian professional footballer who plays as an attacking midfielder for HNK Zadar.

== Club career ==
After spells in Croatia, Cyprus, Greece and Romania he moved to Bosnia and Herzegovina and joined Bosnian Premier League club Olimpik in 2021. He moved to Malta in summer 2021 and extended his contract with Valletta for another season in February 2022.

== Honours ==
Enosis Neon Paralimni

- Cypriot Second Division: 2017–18
