= Radio Vrhbosna =

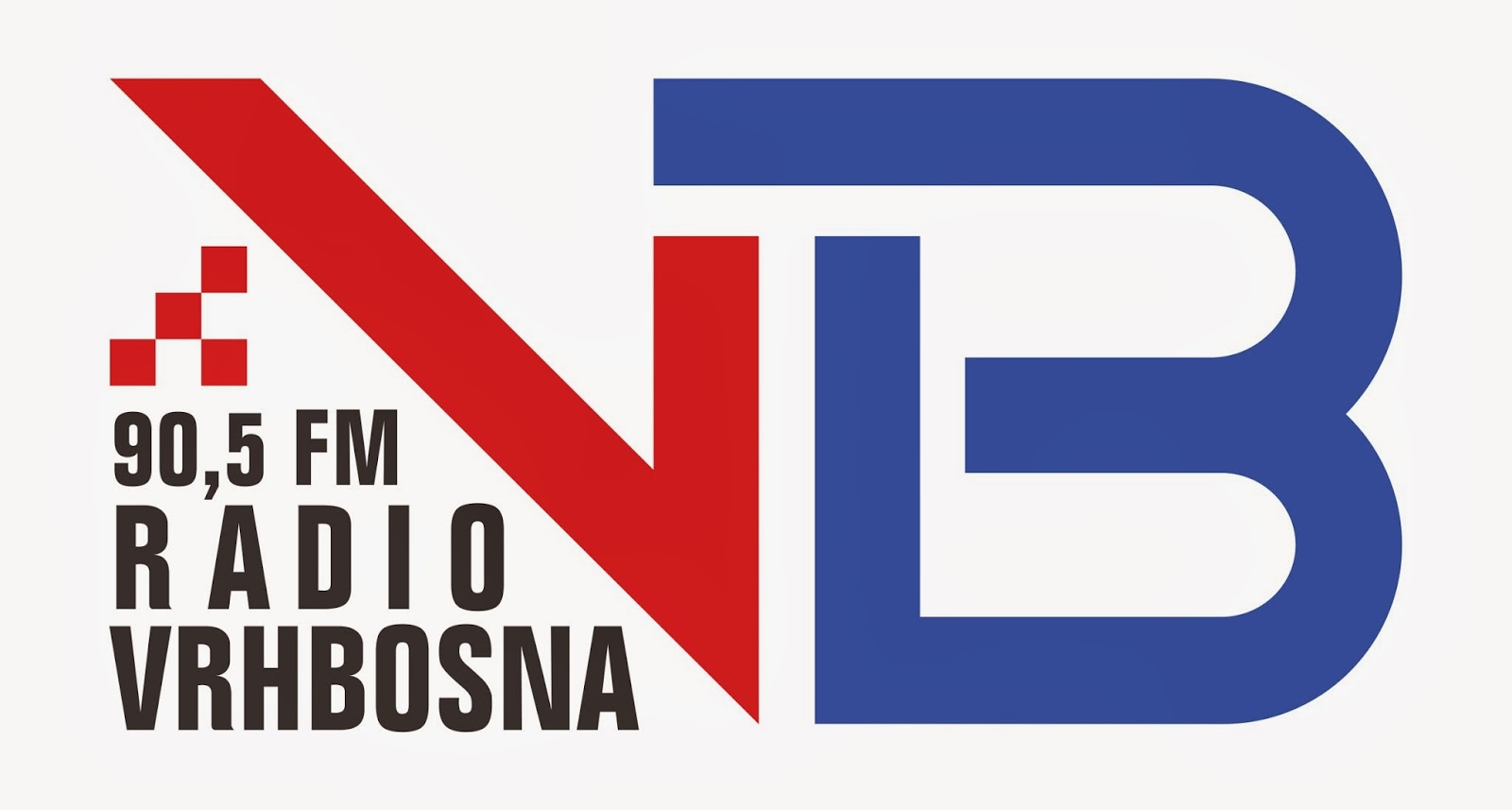
- Sarajevo; Bosnia and Herzegovina
- Broadcast area: Sarajevo
- Frequency: Sarajevo 90.5 MHz

Programming
- Language: Croatian language
- Format: Old-time radio, Christian radio

Ownership
- Owner: Medijski centar Napredak d.o.o. Sarajevo

History
- First air date: 11 April 1993; 18 May 2016
- Former call signs: RP VRHBOSNA
- Call sign meaning: RADIO VRHBOSNA

Technical information
- Transmitter coordinates: 43°52′N 18°25′E

Links
- Website: www.vrhbosna.net

Radio Vrhbosna or Radio postaja Vrhbosna was a Bosnian commercial radio station, broadcasting on Croatian language from Sarajevo, Bosnia and Herzegovina. Radio postaja Vrhbosna was founded on 11 April 1993 (During Bosnian war and Siege of Sarajevo). The program was broadcast at one frequency (Sarajevo 90.5 MHz) and the station focused on contemporary music, talk shows and local news.

Since 18 May 2016 RSG Group bought the frequency (90.5 MHz) for its new radio station Radio Mix.

== See also ==
- Radio Mix
- Media in Sarajevo
- List of radio stations in Bosnia and Herzegovina
