= Branko Bajić =

Bosnian footballer

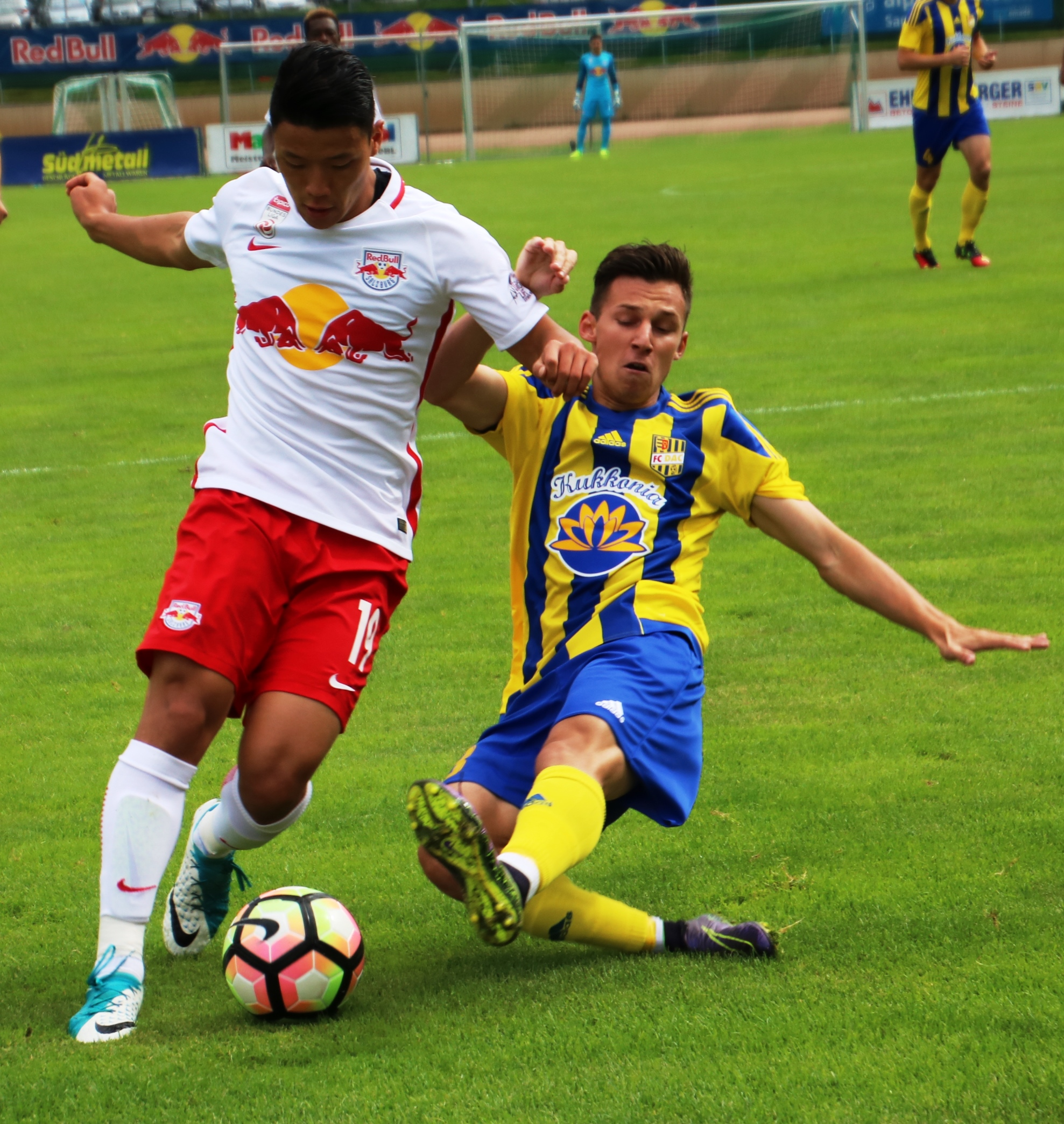

Personal information
- Full name: Branko Bajić
- Date of birth: 4 June 1998 (age 28)
- Place of birth: Bijeljina, Bosnia and Herzegovina
- Height: 1.78 m (5 ft 10 in)
- Position: Defender

Youth career
- –2016: Radnik Bijeljina
- 2016–2017: Čukarički
- 2017: Dunajská Streda

Senior career*
Years	Team	Apps	(Gls)
2014–2016	Radnik Bijeljina	2	(0)
2017–2018	Dunajská Streda	0	(0)
2019	Željezničar	1	(0)
2019–2020	Mladost Doboj Kakanj	15	(0)

International career
2015	Bosnia and Herzegovina U17	6	(0)
2016	Bosnia and Herzegovina U19	2	(0)
- * Club domestic league appearances and goals as of 30 November 2019

Branko Bajić (born 4 June 1998) is a Bosnian professional footballer who plays as a defender. He most recently played for Bosnian Premier League club Mladost Doboj Kakanj.

== Honours ==
Radnik Bijeljina

- Bosnian Cup: 2015–16
