= Radio Ritam Sarajevo =

Coordinates: 43°52′N 18°25′E

Sarajevo; Bosnia and Herzegovina
- Broadcast area: Sarajevo Canton
- Frequencies: Konjic 87.9 MHz; Sarajevo 89.5 MHz; Hadžići 94.0 MHz

Programming
- Language: Bosnian language
- Format: Contemporary hit radio
- Affiliations: Radio Ritam

Ownership
- Owner: "Ritam Radio" d.o.o. Sarajevo
- Sister stations: Radio Ritam Banja Luka; Radio Ritam Zenica; Radio Ritam Visoko; Radio Ritam Mostar

History
- First air date: 23 September 2013 (as Radio Ritam)
- Former call signs: SOUNDSET RADIO RITAM
- Call sign meaning: RADIO RITAM SARAJEVO

Links
- Website: www.radioritam.ba

Radio Ritam Sarajevo is a Bosnian commercial radio station, broadcasting from Sarajevo. The same FM frequencies once were used by the local Radio Hayat from Pazarić, near Sarajevo. Since September 2013, after purchase, a new Radio format and name is presented as a result of joining the newly formed Soundset national radio group in Bosnia and Herzegovina.

Since mid-2015, Radio Ritam Sarajevo has become part of the new Radio Ritam group. Sister radio stations are: Radio Ritam Banja Luka, Radio Ritam Zenica, Radio Ritam Visoko and Radio Ritam Mostar.

City	Frequency MHz
Konjic	87.9 MHz
Sarajevo	89.5 MHz
Hadžići	94.0 MHz

== See also ==
- List of radio stations in Bosnia and Herzegovina
