= Semir Dacić =

Bosnian association football player

Personal information
- Full name: Semir Dacić
- Date of birth: 10 April 1999 (age 27)
- Place of birth: Sarajevo, Bosnia and Herzegovina
- Height: 1.82 m (5 ft 11 1/2 in)
- Position: Midfielder

Team information
- Current team: TOŠK Tešanj

Youth career
- –2018: Željezničar

Senior career*
Years	Team	Apps	(Gls)
2018–2020	Željezničar	13	(1)
2019	→ TOŠK Tešanj (loan)	13	(0)
2020	Novi Pazar	4	(0)
2021–	TOŠK Tešanj	0	(0)
- * Club domestic league appearances and goals as of 29 August 2020

Semir Dacić (born 10 April 1999) is a Bosnian professional footballer who plays as a midfielder for First League of FBiH club TOŠK Tešanj.
