= Dženan Osmanović =

Bosnian association football player

Personal information
- Date of birth: 24 January 2000 (age 26)
- Place of birth: Sarajevo, Bosnia and Herzegovina
- Height: 1.90 m (6 ft 3 in)
- Position: Defensive midfielder

Youth career
- –2018: Željezničar

Senior career*
Years	Team	Apps	(Gls)
2018–2021	Željezničar	7	(0)
2019	→ Radnik Hadžići (loan)	10	(2)
2020–2021	→ Igman Konjic (loan)	22	(0)
2022	Željezničar	9	(0)
2022	TOŠK Tešanj	14	(0)
2023	Fužinar	11	(0)

International career
2018	Bosnia and Herzegovina U18	5	(0)
2018	Bosnia and Herzegovina U19	6	(0)
- * Club domestic league appearances and goals as of 29 May 2022

Dženan Osmanović (born 24 January 2000) is a Bosnian professional footballer who plays as a defensive midfielder.
