= Nikola Mitrović (footballer, born 1997) =

Serbian footballer (born 1997)

Personal information
- Full name: Nikola Mitrović
- Date of birth: 14 December 1997 (age 28)
- Height: 1.77 m (5 ft 9 1/2 in)
- Position: Right midfielder

Youth career
- –2014: Radnički Niš

Senior career*
Years	Team	Apps	(Gls)
2014–2017	Radnički Niš	21	(1)
2015	→ Ozren Sokobanja (loan)	21	(3)
2015	→ Car Konstantin (loan)	24	(5)
2016	→ Sinđelić Belgrade (loan)	8	(3)
2017–2020	Tuzla City	37	(1)
2020	Železničar Pančevo	9	(1)
2021	Igalo		
2021-2023	Krupa		
2023	Igalo		
2024-	Borac Kozarska Dubica		

International career
2013–2014	Serbia U16	6	(0)
2014	Serbia U17	3	(0)
- * Club domestic league appearances and goals as of 18 May 2019

Nikola Mitrović (Serbian Cyrillic: Никола Митровић; born 14 December 1997) is a Serbian professional footballer who plays as a right midfielder.

He had two short spells at Montenegrin side Igalo.
