= Enio Zilić =

Bosnian association football player

Personal information
- Full name: Enio Zilić
- Date of birth: 12 July 2000 (age 26)
- Place of birth: Zenica, Bosnia and Herzegovina
- Position: Centre-back

Team information
- Current team: Rudar Kakanj
- Number: 20

Youth career
- –2016: Čelik Zenica
- 2016–2018: Željezničar

Senior career*
Years	Team	Apps	(Gls)
2018–2019	Željezničar	3	(0)
2019–2020	Čelik Zenica	0	(0)
2020–	Rudar Kakanj	1	(1)

International career
2016	Bosnia and Herzegovina U16	4	(0)
2016–2018	Bosnia and Herzegovina U17	8	(0)
2018	Bosnia and Herzegovina U18	7	(0)
2018	Bosnia and Herzegovina U19	5	(1)
- * Club domestic league appearances and goals as of 8 March 2020

Enio Zilić (born 12 July 2000) is a Bosnian professional footballer who plays as a centre-back for First League of FBiH club Rudar Kakanj.
