= M1 FILM =

- Country: Croatia
- Broadcast area: Bosnia and Herzegovina; Croatia
- Headquarters: Zagreb

Programming
- Language: Croatian
- Picture format: 4:3 576i (SDTV)

Ownership
- Owner: "M1 FILM" d.o.o.
- Key people: Mario Krtalic
- Sister channels: M1 GOLD; M1 FAMILY

History
- Launched: 1 September 2015; 10 years ago
- Closed: 22 May 2017

Links
- Website: www.m1fil.hr

M1 FILM is a Croatian commercial cable television movie channel based in Zagreb, Croatia. The program is mainly produced in Croatian and it is available via cable systems and IPTV platforms throughout the Bosnia and Herzegovina and Croatia.

M1 FILM cooperates with several film studios and distributors in Croatia and abroad whose rich film catalog make quality films for a wide audience, selected films European and Asian cinema, and animated films for children and award-winning documentaries.
