= Radio Sarajevo 90,2 =

Coordinates: 43°52′N 18°25′E

- Sarajevo; Bosnia and Herzegovina
- Broadcast area: Sarajevo Canton
- Frequency: Sarajevo 90.2 MHz

Programming
- Language: Bosnian language
- Format: Urban music, entertainment, talk, news

Ownership
- Owner: "Radio Zid" d.o.o. Sarajevo

History
- Call sign meaning: WWW.RADIOSARAJEVO.BA

Links
- Webcast: On website
- Website: www.radiosarajevo.ba

Radio Sarajevo 90,2 is a Bosnian commercial radio station, broadcasting from Sarajevo, Bosnia and Herzegovina.

The program is currently broadcast at one frequency (Sarajevo 90.2 MHz), estimated number of potential listeners is around 443,685. It focuses on Urban music and entertainment talk shows.

Former Radio Zid - Sarajevo (89.9 MHz) changed its name to current Radio Sarajevo 90,2 on 1 April 2004. The new name of the portal and the radio station reminds on the history of the former national public radio station in Bosnia and Herzegovina, 1945–1992, called Radio Sarajevo. Today, its legal successor is national public broadcasting service, BHRT via BH Radio 1.

== Frequencies ==
- Sarajevo 90.2 MHz

== See also ==
- Radio Sarajevo

== See also ==
- List of radio stations in Bosnia and Herzegovina
