= M1 GOLD =

- Country: Croatia
- Broadcast area: Bosnia and Herzegovina; Croatia
- Headquarters: Zagreb

Programming
- Languages: Bosnian language Croatian language
- Picture format: 4:3 576i (SDTV)

Ownership
- Owner: "M1 FILM" d.o.o.
- Sister channels: M1 FILM

Links
- Website: www.m1film.hr

M1 GOLD is a Croatian commercial cable television movie channel based in Zagreb, Croatia. The program is mainly produced in Croatian and Bosnian language. It is available via cable systems and IPTV platforms throughout the Bosnia and Herzegovina and Croatia.
