= Mohammed Achaari =

Moroccan writer and politician

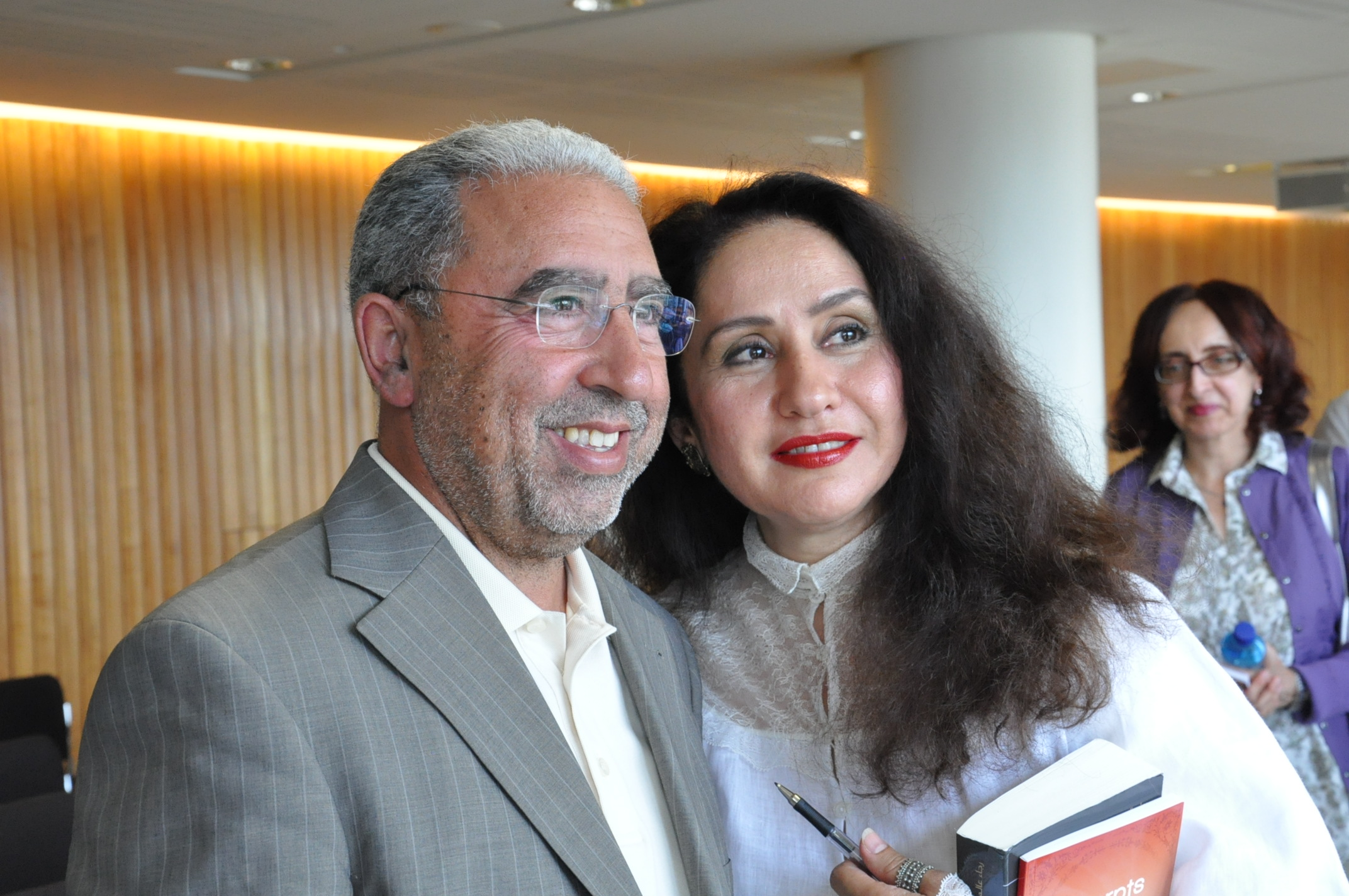
- Mohammed Achaari with Raja'a Alem at the 2011 London Literature Festival
- Born: 1951 (age 74–75); Morocco
- Occupation: Novelist Politician
- Writing career
- Notable work: The Arch and the Butterfly
- Notable awards: International Prize for Arabic Fiction

Mohammed Achaari (Arabic: محمد الأشعري; born 1951) is a Moroccan writer and politician.

== Early life ==
He was born in Moulay Driss Zerhoun. He studied law at the Mohammed V University and graduated in 1976. He published a collection of short stories, six collections of poetry and one novel. Some of his works have been translated into French, Spanish, Russian and Dutch. He wrote articles for several Moroccan newspapers like Al-Alam and Al Ittihad Al Ichtiraki.

== Political life ==
During the early 1980s, he was jailed for his political activities. He has been elected president of the Moroccan Union of Writers twice in the period 1989–1996. In 1997, Achaari was elected delegate for Rabat and in 1998 he became Minister of Culture and in 2002 delegate for Meknes.

== 2011 Arabic Booker Prize ==
Achaari was announced joint winner of the 2011 Arabic Booker Prize for his novel The Arch and the Butterfly. He shared the prize with the Saudi writer Rajaa Alem.

== Bibliography ==
- El Jardin De La Soledad/The Garden of Solitude ISBN 978-84-88599-80-3 (Poem collection in bilingual English and Spanish translation), translated by Khalid Raissouni and Trino Cruz, ed. by Quorum, 2005
