= Alem Merajić =

Bosnian footballer (born 1994)

Personal information
- Full name: Alem Merajić
- Date of birth: 4 February 1994 (age 32)
- Place of birth: Sarajevo, Bosnia and Herzegovina
- Height: 1.80 m (5 ft 11 in)
- Position: Left-back

Team information
- Current team: Milan Heidenheim

Youth career
- 2006–2009: Novi Grad Sarajevo
- 2009–2011: Olimpik
- 2012: Dinamo Zagreb
- 2012–2013: Olimpik

Senior career*
Years	Team	Apps	(Gls)
2013–2015	Olimpik	48	(0)
2016	Shkëndija	11	(0)
2016–2017	Split	13	(0)
2017–2020	Radnik Bijeljina	24	(0)
2020–	Milan Heidenheim		

International career
2010	Bosnia and Herzegovina U17	3	(0)
2012	Bosnia and Herzegovina U18	2	(0)
2012–2013	Bosnia and Herzegovina U19	4	(0)
2015	Bosnia and Herzegovina U21	5	(0)
- * Club domestic league appearances and goals as of 30 December 2020

Alem Merajić (born 4 February 1994) is a Bosnian professional footballer who plays as a left-back for German club AC Milan Heidenheim.

== Club career ==
Starting out in FK Novi Grad Sarajevo and FK Olimpik in his native Sarajevo, Merajić, a youth international, moved in February 2012 to GNK Dinamo Zagreb in Croatia. He returned to Olimpik that same summer, debuting for the first team in 2013 and becoming a first-team regular in the Premier League of Bosnia and Herzegovina. In May 2015, Merajić was part of the Olimpik team that won the club's first historic Bosnian Cup in the 2014–15 season.

In January 2016 he moved to KF Shkëndija, featuring in the Macedonian First League. He won one another trophy in his career, this time with Shkëndija, the Macedonian Cup in May 2016.

This stint proved to be short-term as well, as he joined the Prva HNL team RNK Split in August 2016. After leaving Split in July 2017, Merajić came back to Bosnia and signed with FK Radnik Bijeljina. He left Radnik in June 2020 after his contract with the club expired, winning two Republika Srpska Cups during his time at the club.

== International career ==
Merajić represented Bosnia and Herzegovina on various youth levels. He played for the U17, U18, U19 and U21 national teams.

== Honours ==
Olimpik

- Bosnian Cup: 2014–15

Shkëndija

- Macedonian Cup: 2015–16

Radnik Bijeljina

- Republika Srpska Cup: 2017–18, 2018–19
