= Hayat TV (Bosnia and Herzegovina) =

TV station in Sarajevo, Bosnia and Herzegovina

- Type: Broadcast Television Network
- Country: Bosnia and Herzegovina

Programming
- Language: Bosnian language
- Picture format: 16:9 1080i (HDTV)

History
- Launched: 24 February 1992

Links
- Website: www.hayat.ba

Hayat TV is a television station from Sarajevo, Bosnia and Herzegovina. The word, "Hayat", means "life" in Arabic.

It is a privately owned TV station, which started airing on 24 February 1992. Its coverage is over 1.5 million people in Bosnia, numerous cable subscribers in the neighbouring countries, and satellite viewers. In the beginning of 2009 Hayat TV opened its new headquarters in Vogošća, suburb of Sarajevo.

Hayat now consists of a "Hayat" channel for the Bosnia region and also a Hayat Plus channel for its diaspora. In early 2012 the channel opened two new music channels, Hayat Folk to cater for Bosnian folk music, and Hayat Music to cater for 50% English music, and 50% local pop music. Hayat Music became the first channel in Bosnia to be transmitted in widescreen, 16:9 ratio. In 2014, Hayat opened first Bosnian channel for kids named Hayatovci. Hayat's logo bears resemblance to American TV network NBC's distinct peacock logo.

Hayat, along with ATV, founded Program Plus, part of the joint program between the two television companies, in 2011.

All five of Hayat's channels transmit in Europe through EutelSat16 satellite and various cable operators. The station also broadcasts all of its channels worldwide on various IPTV platforms - Hayat TV, Hayat Plus, Hayat Folk, Hayat Music and Hayatovci.

== Availability in Bosnia and Herzegovina ==
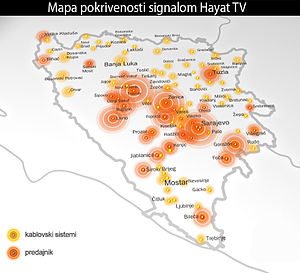

yellow: cable and iptv systems;

orange: terrestrial;

== Programmes ==
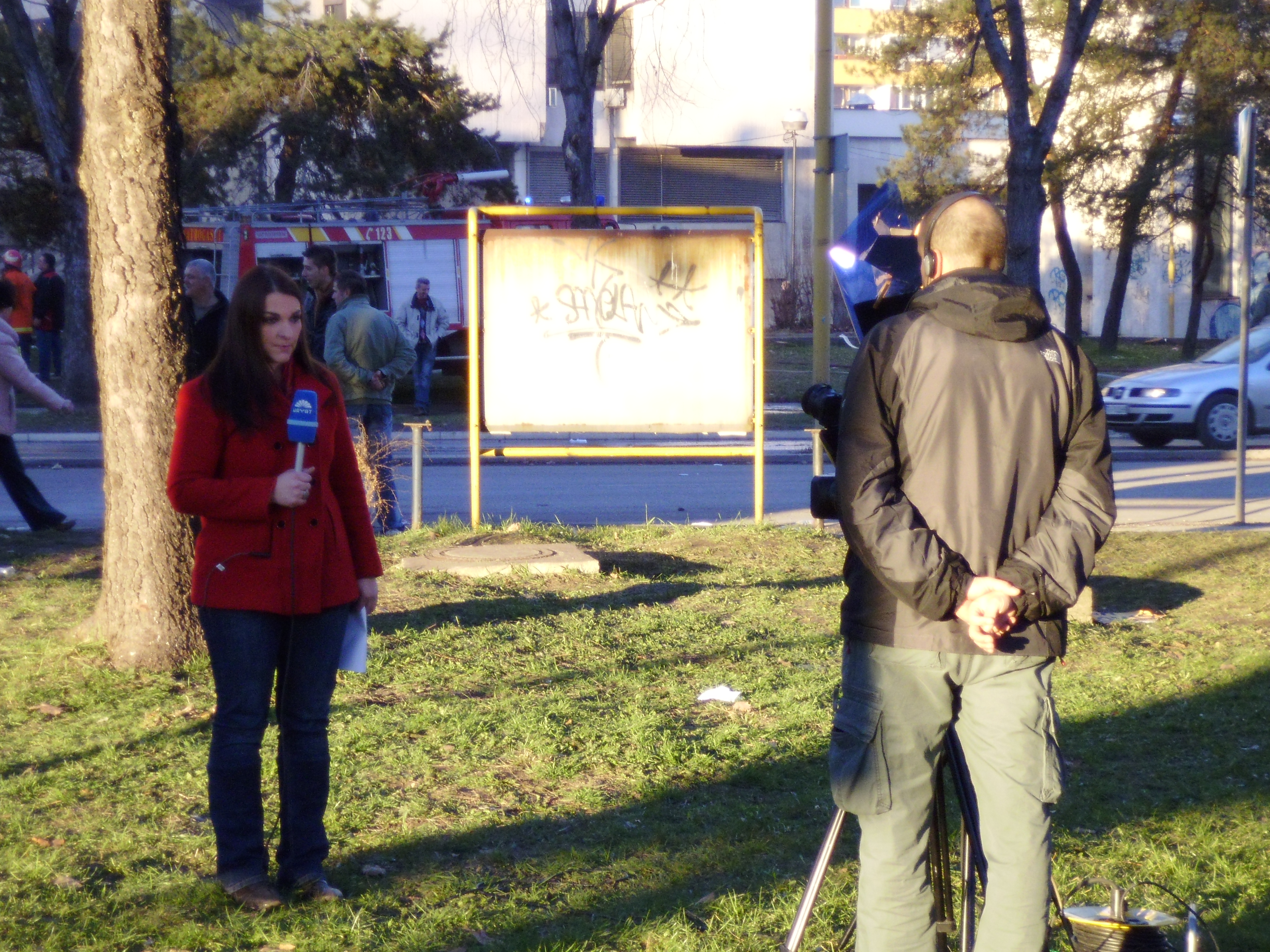
A Hayat TV reporter outside the burning Government Building of Tuzla Canton

=== Telenovelas / Series since September, 2018 ===
Original name	Bosnian translation	Origin
Bir Zamanlar Çukurova	Gorka zemlja	Turkey
Kadın	Žena	Turkey
Bizim Hikaye	Naša priča	Turkey
Diriliş: Ertuğrul	Ertugrul	Turkey
Kara Sevda	Beskrajna ljubav	Turkey
İstanbullu Gelin	Snaha	Turkey

== TV channels ==
- Hayat TV
- Hayat Plus
- Hayat Folk
- Hayat Music
- Hayatovci
