= Filip Arežina =

Bosnian footballer (born 1992)

Personal information
- Full name: Filip Arežina
- Date of birth: 8 November 1992 (age 34)
- Place of birth: Gornji Vakuf-Uskoplje, Bosnia and Herzegovina
- Height: 1.81 m (5 ft 11 1/2 in)
- Position: Midfielder

Youth career
- Sloga Uskoplje
- Zrinjski Mostar

Senior career*
Years	Team	Apps	(Gls)
2010	Sloga Uskoplje	10	(3)
2011–2013	Zrinjski Mostar	32	(3)
2014	Olimpik	3	(0)
2014–2015	Rudeš	9	(5)
2015–2016	Rudar Prijedor	16	(4)
2016	Zrinjski Mostar	10	(2)
2016	GKS Tychy	7	(0)
2017–2019	Mladost Doboj Kakanj	35	(8)
2018	→ Željezničar (loan)	6	(1)
2019–2020	Lokomotiva	5	(0)
2020	Tuzla City	3	(0)
2020–2021	Zrinjski Mostar	8	(0)
2022–2023	Leotar	4	(1)
2023	Čelik Zenica		

International career
2012–2013	Bosnia and Herzegovina U21	9	(1)
2016	Bosnia and Herzegovina	1	(0)
- * Club domestic league appearances and goals as of 7 November 2024

Filip Arežina (born 8 November 1992) is a Bosnian professional footballer who plays as a midfielder.

== International career ==
Arežina made his first international appearance in a Kirin Cup friendly game final against Japan on 7 June 2016, having substituted Mario Vrančić in the 89th minute.

== Honours ==
Zrinjski Mostar

- Bosnian Premier League: 2015–16

Bosnia and Herzegovina

- Kirin Cup: 2016
