= Shadia Alem =

Saudi Arabian visual artist

- شادية عالم
- Born: 1960 (age 65–66); Mecca, Saudi Arabia
- Other name: Shādiyah 'Ālim
- Education: King Abdulaziz University
- Known for: Sculpture, installation art, painting
- Notable work: The Black Arch - Venice Biennale
- Website: https://www.shadiaalem.com/

Shadia Alem (Arabic: شادية عالم, romanized: Shādiyah 'Ālim; born in Mecca) is a Saudi Arabian visual artist. She is known for her sculpture, installation art, and painting. She lives and works between Paris and Jeddah.

== Early life ==
Shadia Alem was born in Makkah. Her childhood was spent in Taif, where she reportedly painted on doors from a young age. Her father was a calligrapher and her mother embroidered.

== Education ==
Alem graduated with a BA in Art and English Literature from King Abdulaziz University.

== Career ==
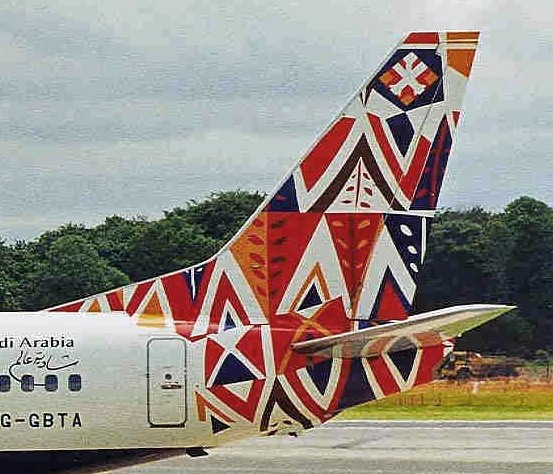
G-GBTA B737-436 British Airways - Youm al-Suq artwork

Since 1985 Alem's work has been exhibited nationally in Saudi Arabia and internationally. Some works are a commentary of the lives of women in Saudi Arabia, using form to demonstrate the anxiety that women may live under.

Alem's work, Youm al-Suq, was selected by British Airways to appear on the livery of its aircraft in 1998. Her 2007 retrospective exhibition at Albareh Gallery demonstrated the development of her work from portraiture, to landscape, to photography. She has also exhibited at the Kunstmuseum in Bonn, at Amum in Tennessee, in Istanbul as part of its 2010 Capital of Culture programme, and at the 6th Berlin Biennale.

=== Venice Biennale ===
In 2011, Saudi Arabia entered the Venice Biennale for the first time with Alem as the country's representative. Her work, entitled The Black Arch, which draws on folklore, Islam and medieval travel narratives. The work was made of up of a dark cube suspended on its point over a sea of iridescent spheres. Visitors were encouraged to move around the work and the sphere represented travellers of all kinds. It covered an area of 350 square metres; its scale as an installation has been interpreted as a challenge to spatial order. The colour black was also key to the installation: as the colour of Ka'aba cloth, the colour of the silhouettes of veiled women and of the black stone.

In the same year, Alem was one of the artists chosen to feature in the British Museum's exhibition Hajj. However, 2011 was not just a year of achievement - it is also the year their mother died, 15 years worth of work was lost in a flood in Jeddah and computer failure lost five further projects.

=== Women and art in Saudi Arabia ===
In 2011, Shadia Alem and her sister, writer, were featured in Vogue Italia, discussing their work and the role of women in Saudi Arabia. While Alem tackles gender issues through her work, her sister sees her writing as genderless. In Alem's work Negative No More, the pre-and-misconceptions of Saudi women are commented on. This installation consisted of 5000 photographic negatives, none of which feature women, to draw attention to the fact that women have been absent from Saudi Arabian political history.
