= Antena Sarajevo =

Coordinates: 43°52′N 18°25′E

Sarajevo; Bosnia and Herzegovina
- Broadcast area: Sarajevo
- Frequency: Sarajevo 90.9 MHz

Programming
- Language: Bosnian language
- Format: Contemporary hit radio, entertainment, talk, news
- Affiliations: RSG Group

Ownership
- Owner: "RSG" d.o.o. Sarajevo
- Sister stations: RSG Radio; Radio Mix

History
- First air date: 6 April 2009 (as RSG1 Sarajevo); 3 December 2012 (as Antena Sarajevo)
- Former call signs: RSG1 SARAJEVO
- Call sign meaning: ANTENA SARAJEVO

Links
- Website: www.antena.ba

Antena Sarajevo is a Bosnian commercial radio station, broadcasting from Sarajevo.

== History and programming ==
RSG1 Sarajevo radio was founded 6 April 2009 and was conceived as an urban radio service for Sarajevo. Since December 2012, a new Radio format is presented as a result of the positive experiences of RSG1 Sarajevo, and European and regional trends in the radio industry.

Antena Sarajevo is formatted as a city radio service that broadcasts only the greatest hits. Antenna Sarajevo is part of the informal media group in the radio market of Bosnia and Herzegovina called RSG Group. RSG Group consists of two radio programs RSG Radio and Antena Sarajevo, marketing agency and production – Netra, radio news production services – Media servis, and Web portals www.rsg.ba and www.antena.ba..

The station focuses on contemporary pop music. Antenna Sarajevo also has traffic service for the city of Sarajevo, where listeners can find more information by calling the toll-free call center (0800 51 011). Latest national news broadcast for five minutes before the full hour, while the Sarajevo city news are broadcast every half-hour. Media servis produces all the news for Antenna Sarajevo.

The program is currently broadcast at one frequency (Sarajevo 90.9 MHz), estimated number of potential listeners is around 426,581.

== Frequencies ==
- Sarajevo 90.9 MHz

== See also ==
- List of radio stations in Bosnia and Herzegovina
