= Hayat Folk =

Hayat Folk TV
- Country: Bosnia and Herzegovina
- Broadcast area: Bosnia and Herzegovina; Worldwide
- Network: Hayat TV
- Headquarters: Vogošća

Programming
- Language: Bosnian language
- Picture format: 16:9 1080i (HDTV)

Ownership
- Owner: HAYAT društvo za proizvodnju i emitovanje televizijskog programa d.o.o. Sarajevo
- Key people: Elvir Švrakić (General Director)
- Sister channels: Hayat Music TV

History
- Launched: 24 February 2012

Links
- Website: www.hayat.ba

Hayat Folk TV is specialized music television channel from Bosnia and Herzegovina. The program is mainly produced in Bosnian language, 24/7. During the day, viewers can via text message choose preferred music video which will be broadcast during the program. Besides music videos, Hayat Folk TV broadcasts popular concerts from their own production (or older recordings from the archives of Hayat TV), music shows, reports and interviews with national singers. The most represented musically genre is sevdah (traditional Sevdalinka songs), along with pop/folk music from Bosnia and Herzegovina and the Southeastern Europe region. Hayat Production also promote their own artists on this music television channel.

Hayat Folk TV is available via cable systems throughout the Bosnia and Herzegovina and former Yugoslavia, Balkan countries or worldwide via exclusive IPTV platforms offering a special Hayat TV package (with Hayat TV, Hayat Plus and Hayat Music TV).

== Current line-up on Hayat Folk TV ==
Daily program scheme on Hayat Music TV consists of several music shows and playlists that are the backbone of the entire program. At any moment, viewers know what they watch, thanks to the logo in the upper left corner.

- ŽELJE S FEJSA - music videos chosen by fans from the official Facebook page
- SEVDALINKE - (traditional Bosnian music)
- VIKEND SA... - (WEEKEND WITH ...)
- NEKAD I SAD - (THEN AND NOW)
- SAMO BALADE - (Love songs only)
- SAMO ZABAVNA - (Pop songs only)
- 100 % HITOVI - (100% HITS)
- 10 NAJBOLJIH - (Top 10)
- NOVI HIT! - (NEW HITS)
- 5 U PET - (5 IN FIVE)
- BALKAN MIX - Folk music from Southeastern Europe
- FOLK MIX - (Popular folk songs)

== See also ==
- Hayat TV
