= Hayat Music =

Hayat Music TV
- Country: Bosnia and Herzegovina
- Broadcast area: Bosnia and Herzegovina
- Headquarters: Vogošća

Programming
- Language(s): Bosnian
- Picture format: 16:9 1080i (HDTV)

Ownership
- Owner: HAYAT društvo za proizvodnju i emitovanje televizijskog programa d.o.o. Sarajevo
- Key people: Elvir Švrakić (General Director)
- Sister channels: Hayat Folk

History
- Launched: 2012

Links
- Website: www.hayat.ba

Hayat Music TV is a music television channel from Hayat TV that broadcasting music videos available via cable systems in Bosnia and Herzegovina and former Yugoslavia.

== Programming ==
Programming is in the Bosnian language including Bosnian music and foreign and international music.

- A PLAYLISTA - (A playlist) current and latest home videos from Bosnia and Herzegovina
- B PLAYLISTA - (B playlist) current and latest international music video clips
- 10 NAJBOLJIH - (Top 10) top list of current domestic and foreign videos
- SAMO HITOVI - (Hits only)
- NOVO! - (NEW!) - the latest premiere music videos
- 10 NAJBOLJIH ŽENSKIH VOKALA - (Top 10 female vocalists) - list of the top 10 female vocalists
- 10 NAJBOLJIH MUŠKIH VOKALA - (Top 10 male vocalists) - list of the top 10 male vocalists
- JA VOLIM OSAMDESETE - (I LOVE 1980s)
- JA VOLIM DEVETDESETE - (I LOVE 1990s)
- JA VOLIM BALADE - (Love songs) list of emotional love songs
- JA VOLIM OLDIES GOLDIES - popular music of various musical styles
