= 2019–20 FK Željezničar season =

Željezničar
2019–20 season
- Chairman: Jasmin Badžak (interim, until 29 June); Admir Džubur (from 29 June)
- Manager: Amar Osim
- Stadium: Grbavica Stadium
- Premijer Liga BiH: 2nd
- Kup BiH: Semi-finals
- Top goalscorer: League: Sulejman Krpić (12); All: Sulejman Krpić (12)
- Highest home attendance: 11,017 vs Sarajevo (31 August 2019)
- Lowest home attendance: 2,753 vs Mladost Doboj Kakanj (2 October 2019)
- Average home league attendance: 5,718
Home colours	Away colours

The 2019–20 season was Željezničar's 99th in existence and their 20th season in the Premier League BH. Besides competing in the Premier League, the team also competed in the National Cup.

In that season, the league ended abruptly on 1 June 2020 due to the COVID-19 pandemic in Bosnia and Herzegovina and by default Željezničar finished in second place, qualifying to the 2020–21 UEFA Europa League qualifying rounds.

== Season review ==
=== June ===
On 13 June, Željezničar announced the signing of 24-year-old Filip Erić.

On 18 June, Željezničar and Ermin Zec negotiated a three-year contract extension lasting until June 2022.

On 20 June, Željezničar announced the signing of 31-year-old Mehmed Alispahić.

On 24 June, Željezničar and Siniša Stevanović negotiated a two-year contract extension lasting until May 2021.

On 25 June, Željezničar announced the signing of 18-year-old Amar Mehić from Zvijezda Gradačac.

On 26 June, Željezničar and Milkos extended their sponsorship agreement.

On 27 June, Željezničar signed a sponsorship agreement with Tondach Wienerbeger and Sarajevo Business Consulting.

On 27 June, Željezničar announced the signing of 21-year-old Petar Bojo from Mladost Doboj Kakanj.

On 28 June, Željezničar and General Logistic extended their partnership agreement.

On 29 June, the club announced Admir Džubur as the new Chairman of the club.

=== July ===
On 1 July, Željezničar and Proteam signed a partnership agreement.

On 2 July, Željezničar and Porsche BH extended their sponsorship agreement.

On 8 July, Željezničar announced the signing of 18-year-old Sedad Subašić from Rudar Kakanj.

On 13 July, Željezničar and BBI Banka extended their sponsorship agreement.

On 15 July, Željezničar and Perugia completed the transfer of Matej Rodin.

On 17 July, Željezničar and Admiral Casino extended their sponsorship agreement.

On 17 July, the club announced new home kit for the upcoming season. Following day, the club announced new away kit.

On 18 July, the club announced six players will leave on loan to various clubs in the First League of FBiH.

On 19 July, Željezničar and Sarajevo osiguranje extended their sponsorship agreement.

On 23 July, Željezničar extended their sponsorship agreement with Amko komerc and Farmavita.

On 30 July, Željezničar and Rail Cargo Logistics – BH osiguranje extended their sponsorship agreement.

=== August ===
On 2 August, Željezničar announced the signing of 31-year-old Semir Štilić.

=== October ===
On 18 October, Željezničar signed a sponsorship agreement with Imtec.

On 22 October, Željezničar signed a sponsorship agreement with Franck.

On 24 October, Željezničar signed a sponsorship agreement with Exclusive Change (EXC).

On 25 October, Željezničar extended their sponsorship agreement with Sarajevski kiseljak.

On 29 October, the club announced that the construction of the south stand of the Grbavica Stadium is scheduled to begin in September 2020 and due to end in September 2021.

=== December ===
On 10 December, Željezničar extended their sponsorship agreement with Eurofarm.

On 11 December, Željezničar extended their sponsorship agreement with Svjetlostkomerc.

On 12 December, Željezničar extended their sponsorship agreement with Vitinka.

On 12 December, Željezničar signed a sponsorship agreement with BH Passport.

On 17 December, Željezničar and Umm Salal completed the transfer of Enes Sipović.

On 20 December, Željezničar signed a 5 year sponsorship agreement with Italian sportswear company Macron.

=== January ===
On 3 January, Željezničar and Suwon Samsung Bluewings completed the transfer of Sulejman Krpić.

On 7 January, Željezničar announced the signing of 28-year-old Ivan Lendrić.

On 12 January, Željezničar announced Haris Hajdarević will be leaving on loan to Sloboda Tuzla.

On 14 January, Željezničar announced the signing of 30-year-old Aleksandar Jovanović.

On 30 January, Željezničar announced the signing of 33-year-old Aleksandar Kosorić.

On 30 January, Željezničar and Mladen Veselinović negotiated a two-and-a-half-year contract extension lasting until June 2022.

=== February ===
On 1 February, Željezničar announced the signing of 25-year-old Frane Ikić.

On 14 February, Željezničar announced the signings of 33-year-old Nermin Jamak and 25-year-old Luka Miletić.

On 20 February, Željezničar extended their sponsorship agreement with Unigradnja d.d. and with Proteam.

On 21 February, Željezničar extended their sponsorship agreement with Deny-Prom and with NEBI.

On 27 February, Željezničar announced the signing of 19-year-old Edin Mujić.

On 28 February, Željezničar extended their sponsorship agreement with Lutrija BiH.

=== March ===
On 11 March, Željezničar extended their sponsorship agreement with Nexe beton d.o.o.

On 13 March, Željezničar extended their sponsorship agreement with Telemach.

On 17 March, Željezničar extended their sponsorship agreement with NLB Banka.

On 30 March, Željezničar signed a sponsorship agreement with Central Osiguranje d.d.

On 31 March, Željezničar extended their sponsorship agreement with HOŠE Komerc.

=== May ===
On 18 May, Željezničar signed a sponsorship agreement with Mliječna industrija 99.

On 20 May, Željezničar extended their sponsorship agreement with General Logistic.

On 21 May, Željezničar extended their sponsorship agreement with In Time.

== Squad information ==
=== Players ===
N	Pos.	Nat.	Name	Age	EU	Since	App	Goals	Ends	Transfer fee	Notes
1	GK	(Serbia)	Erić	31	Non-EU	2019	17	0	2021	Free	Second nationality: BiH
2	DF	(Serbia)	Stevanović	36	EU	2016	119	0	2021	Free	Second nationality: Croatia
3	DF	(Croatia)	Pavić	30	EU	2018	47	0	2020	Free	Second nationality: Germany
5	DF	(Bosnia and Herzegovina)	Kosorić	38	Non-EU	2020	90	3	2022	Free	Second nationality: Serbia
6	DF	(Bosnia and Herzegovina)	Miletić	31	EU	2020	0	0	2022	Free	Second nationality: Croatia
7	MF	(Bosnia and Herzegovina)	Subašić	24	Non-EU	2019	4	0	2024	Free	
8	MF	(Bosnia and Herzegovina)	Mujezinović	32	Non-EU	2019	27	0	2021	Free	
9	MF	(Bosnia and Herzegovina)	Ramović	33	Non-EU	2017	63	8	2020	Free	
10	FW	(Bosnia and Herzegovina)	Zec	37	Non-EU	2019	17	5	2022	Free	
11	DF	(Bosnia and Herzegovina)	Stanić	36	EU	2019	274	11	2020	Free	Second nationality: Croatia
13	GK	(Bosnia and Herzegovina)	Kjosevski	30	Non-EU	2013	131	1	2020	Youth system	Second nationality: Macedonia
14	MF	(Bosnia and Herzegovina)	Štilić (C)	38	Non-EU	2019	78	28	2022	Free	Originally from youth system
15	DF	(Australia)	Jovanović	36	Non-EU	2020	2	0	2020	Free	Second nationality: Serbia
16	MF	(Bosnia and Herzegovina)	Alispahić	37	Non-EU	2019	20	2	2021	Free	
17	MF	(Bosnia and Herzegovina)	Mujić	24	Non-EU	2020	0	0	2023	Youth system	
18	FW	(Bosnia and Herzegovina)	Zajmović	31	EU	2017	66	12	2020	Free	Originally from youth system
19	MF	(Bosnia and Herzegovina)	Sadiković	30	Non-EU	2019	118	12	2020	Free	Originally from youth system
20	MF	(Bosnia and Herzegovina)	Veselinović	32	Non-EU	2018	49	4	2022	Free	
22	MF	(Bosnia and Herzegovina)	Bojo	27	EU	2019	21	2	2021	€30,000	Second nationality: Croatia
23	MF	(Bosnia and Herzegovina)	Jamak	39	Non-EU	2021	173	8	2021	Free	Originally from youth system
24	FW	(Croatia)	Lendrić	34	EU	2020	55	32	2021	Free	Second nationality: BiH
25	DF	(Croatia)	Ikić	31	EU	2020	3	0	2020	Free	
26	MF	(Bosnia and Herzegovina)	Dacić	26	Non-EU	2018	17	1	2020	Youth system	
27	DF	(Bosnia and Herzegovina)	Osmanković	28	Non-EU	2014	58	2	2020	Youth system	
30	GK	(Bosnia and Herzegovina)	Kršić	25	Non-EU	2018	0	0	2020	Youth system	
33	DF	(Bosnia and Herzegovina)	Šehić	25	Non-EU	2018	6	0	2021	Youth system	
–	GK	(Bosnia and Herzegovina)	Karavdić	27	Non-EU	2017	0	0	2020	Youth system	
–	MF	(Bosnia and Herzegovina)	Hajdarević	27	Non-EU	2017	54	1	2021	Youth system	On loan at Sloboda Tuzla
–	MF	(Bosnia and Herzegovina)	Mehić	25	Non-EU	2019	2	0	2024	Free	On loan at Metalleghe-BSI
–	MF	(Bosnia and Herzegovina)	Osmanović	25	Non-EU	2017	8	0	2022	Youth system	On loan at Igman Konjic
–	MF	(Bosnia and Herzegovina)	Žerić	27	Non-EU	2015	30	2	2020	Youth system	On loan at Goražde
–	FW	(Bosnia and Herzegovina)	Šubo	27	Non-EU	2017	0	0	2020	Youth system	On loan at Igman Konjic

- Last updated: 8 March 2020
- Source: fkzeljeznicar.ba

=== Disciplinary record ===
Includes all competitive matches and only players that got booked throughout the season. The list is sorted by shirt number, and then position.

N	P	Nat.	Name	League			Cup			Europe			Others			Total			Notes
N	P	Nat.	Name	Yellow card	Second yellow card	Red card	Yellow card	Second yellow card	Red card	Yellow card	Second yellow card	Red card	Yellow card	Second yellow card	Red card	Yellow card	Second yellow card	Red card	Notes
2	DF	(Serbia)	Stevanović	8			1									9			
3	DF	(Croatia)	Pavić	4												4			
5	DF	(Bosnia and Herzegovina)	Kosorić	1												1			
9	MF	(Bosnia and Herzegovina)	Ramović	5												5			
11	DF	(Bosnia and Herzegovina)	Stanić	3			1									4			
14	MF	(Bosnia and Herzegovina)	Štilić	3			1									4			
15	DF	(Australia)	Jovanović				1									1			
16	MF	(Bosnia and Herzegovina)	Alispahić	6												6			
18	FW	(Bosnia and Herzegovina)	Zajmović	1												1			
19	MF	(Bosnia and Herzegovina)	Sadiković	4												4			
20	MF	(Bosnia and Herzegovina)	Veselinović	3												3			
22	MF	(Bosnia and Herzegovina)	Bojo	3	1											3	1		
27	DF	(Bosnia and Herzegovina)	Osmanković	6			1									7			

Last updated: 8 March 2020
Source: Competitive matches and fkzeljeznicar.ba
Ordered by (red card) , (second yellow card) and (yellow card)
(yellow card) = Number of bookings; (second yellow card) = Number of sending offs after a second yellow card; (red card) = Number of sending offs by a direct red card.

== Squad statistics ==
=== Goalscorers ===
No.	Pos.	Nation	Name	Premijer Liga BiH	Kup BiH	Total
7	FW	(Bosnia and Herzegovina)	Krpić	12	0	12
14	MF	(Bosnia and Herzegovina)	Štilić	8	1	9
6	MF	(Bosnia and Herzegovina)	A. Zec	2	3	5
18	FW	(Bosnia and Herzegovina)	Zajmović	2	2	4
19	MF	(Bosnia and Herzegovina)	Sadiković	2	1	3
20	MF	(Bosnia and Herzegovina)	Veselinović	1	2	3
22	MF	(Bosnia and Herzegovina)	Bojo	2	0	2
16	MF	(Bosnia and Herzegovina)	Alispahić	2	0	2
9	MF	(Bosnia and Herzegovina)	Ramović	1	1	2
10	FW	(Bosnia and Herzegovina)	E. Zec	1	0	1
15	DF	(Bosnia and Herzegovina)	Bogičević	1	0	1
40	DF	(Bosnia and Herzegovina)	Sipović	1	0	1
25	MF	(Bosnia and Herzegovina)	Hajdarević	1	0	1
27	DF	(Bosnia and Herzegovina)	Osmanković	1	0	1
24	FW	(Croatia)	Lendrić	1	0	1
#	Own goals			2	1	3
TOTAL				40	11	51

Last updated: 8 March 2020

=== Assists ===
No.	Pos.	Nation	Name	Premijer Liga BiH	Kup BiH	Total
20	MF	(Bosnia and Herzegovina)	Veselinović	5	2	7
14	MF	(Bosnia and Herzegovina)	Štilić	5	1	6
8	MF	(Bosnia and Herzegovina)	Mujezinović	1	3	4
3	MF	(Croatia)	Pavić	3	0	3
10	FW	(Bosnia and Herzegovina)	E. Zec	3	0	3
9	MF	(Bosnia and Herzegovina)	Ramović	3	0	3
19	MF	(Bosnia and Herzegovina)	Sadiković	3	0	3
18	FW	(Bosnia and Herzegovina)	Zajmović	2	0	2
25	MF	(Bosnia and Herzegovina)	Hajdarević	1	0	1
21	MF	(Bosnia and Herzegovina)	Subašić	1	0	1
2	DF	(Serbia)	Stevanović	1	0	1
TOTAL				28	6	34

Last updated: 8 March 2020

=== Clean sheets ===
No.	Nation	Name	Premijer Liga BiH	Kup BiH	Total	Games played
1	(Serbia)	Erić	7	1	8	17
13	(Bosnia and Herzegovina)	Kjosevski	3	1	4	7
TOTAL			10	2	12	24

Last updated: 8 March 2020

== Transfers ==
=== Players in ===
No.	Pos.	Nat.	Name	Age	EU	Moving from	Type	Transfer window	Ends	Transfer fee	Source
1	GK	(Serbia)	Filip Erić	31	Non-EU	Zvijezda 09	End of contract	Summer	2021	Free	fkzeljeznicar.ba
16	MF	(Bosnia and Herzegovina)	Mehmed Alispahić	37	Non-EU	Sloboda Tuzla	End of contract	Summer	2021	Free	fkzeljeznicar.ba
4	MF	(Bosnia and Herzegovina)	Amar Mehić	25	Non-EU	Zvijezda	End of contract	Summer	2024	Free	fkzeljeznicar.ba
22	MF	(Bosnia and Herzegovina)	Petar Bojo	27	Non-EU	Mladost Doboj Kakanj	Transfer	Summer	2021	€30,000	fkzeljeznicar.ba
7	MF	(Bosnia and Herzegovina)	Sedad Subašić	24	Non-EU	Rudar Kakanj	End of contract	Summer	2024	Free	fkzeljeznicar.ba
14	MF	(Bosnia and Herzegovina)	Semir Štilić	38	Non-EU	Wisła Płock (Poland)	End of contract	Summer	2022	Free	fkzeljeznicar.ba
24	FW	(Croatia)	Ivan Lendrić	34	EU	Zrinjski	End of contract	Winter	2021	Free	fkzeljeznicar.ba
15	DF	(Australia)	Aleksandar Jovanović	36	Non-EU	Jeju United (South Korea)	End of contract	Winter	2020	Free	fkzeljeznicar.ba
5	DF	(Bosnia and Herzegovina)	Aleksandar Kosorić	38	Non-EU	Balzan (Malta)	End of contract	Winter	2022	Free	fkzeljeznicar.ba
25	DF	(Croatia)	Frane Ikić	31	EU	Fužinar (Slovenia)	End of contract	Winter	2020	Free	fkzeljeznicar.ba
23	MF	(Bosnia and Herzegovina)	Nermin Jamak	39	Non-EU	Čelik	End of contract	Winter	2021	Free	fkzeljeznicar.ba
6	DF	(Bosnia and Herzegovina)	Luka Miletić	31	Non-EU	Čelik	End of contract	Winter	2022	Free	fkzeljeznicar.ba

Total expenditure: ▼€30.000

=== Players out ===
No.	Pos.	Nat.	Name	Age	EU	Moving to	Type	Transfer window	Transfer fee	Source
1	GK	(Bosnia and Herzegovina)	Irfan Fejzić	39	Non-EU	Sloboda Tuzla	End of contract	Summer	Free	sportsport.ba
16	DF	(Bosnia and Herzegovina)	Enio Zilić	25	Non-EU	Čelik	End of contract	Summer	Free	sportsport.ba
5	DF	(Bosnia and Herzegovina)	Branko Bajić	27	Non-EU	Mladost Doboj Kakanj	Contract termination	Summer	Free	facebook.com/mladostdk
24	FW	(Bosnia and Herzegovina)	Faris Zubanović	25	Non-EU	Fremad Amager (Denmark)	Transfer	Summer	€50,000	fremadamagerelite.dk
44	DF	(Bosnia and Herzegovina)	Matej Rodin	29	Non-EU	Perugia (Italy)	Transfer	Summer	€220,000	acperugiacalcio.com
12	GK	(Bosnia and Herzegovina)	Aldin Ćeman	30	Non-EU	Metalleghe-BSI	End of contract	Summer	Free	
17	MF	(Bosnia and Herzegovina)	Dženan Osmanović	25	Non-EU	Radnik Hadžići	Loan	Summer	Free	fkzeljeznicar.ba
8	MF	(Bosnia and Herzegovina)	Eldar Šehić	25	Non-EU	TOŠK Tešanj	Loan	Summer	Free	fkzeljeznicar.ba
22	GK	(Bosnia and Herzegovina)	Vernes Karavdić	27	Non-EU	Rudar Kakanj	Loan	Summer	Free	fkzeljeznicar.ba
39	MF	(Bosnia and Herzegovina)	Denis Žerić	27	Non-EU	Goražde	Loan	Summer	Free	fkzeljeznicar.ba
30	FW	(Bosnia and Herzegovina)	Mirza Šubo	27	Non-EU	Igman Konjic	Loan	Summer	Free	fkzeljeznicar.ba
40	DF	(Bosnia and Herzegovina)	Enes Sipović	35	Non-EU	Umm Salal (Qatar)	Transfer	Winter	€100,000	fkzeljeznicar.ba
7	FW	(Bosnia and Herzegovina)	Sulejman Krpić	34	Non-EU	Suwon Samsung Bluewings (South Korea)	Transfer	Winter	€230,000	fkzeljeznicar.ba
25	MF	(Bosnia and Herzegovina)	Haris Hajdarević	26	Non-EU	Sloboda Tuzla	Loan	Winter	Free	fkzeljeznicar.ba
15	DF	(Bosnia and Herzegovina)	Jadranko Bogičević	42	Non-EU	Slavija	End of contract	Winter	Free	fkzeljeznicar.ba
6	MF	(Bosnia and Herzegovina)	Asim Zec	31	Non-EU	Zrinjski	Contract termination	Winter	Free	fkzeljeznicar.ba
4	MF	(Bosnia and Herzegovina)	Amar Mehić	25	Non-EU	Metalleghe-BSI	Loan	Winter	Free	fkzeljeznicar.ba
17	MF	(Bosnia and Herzegovina)	Dženan Osmanović	25	Non-EU	Igman Konjic	Loan	Winter	Free	fkzeljeznicar.ba
39	MF	(Bosnia and Herzegovina)	Denis Žerić	27	Non-EU	Goražde	Loan	Winter	Free	fkzeljeznicar.ba
14	DF	(Bosnia and Herzegovina)	Aldin Šehić	26	Non-EU	Free agent	Contract termination	Winter	Free	

Total income: ▲€600,000
Net: ▲€570,000

== Club ==
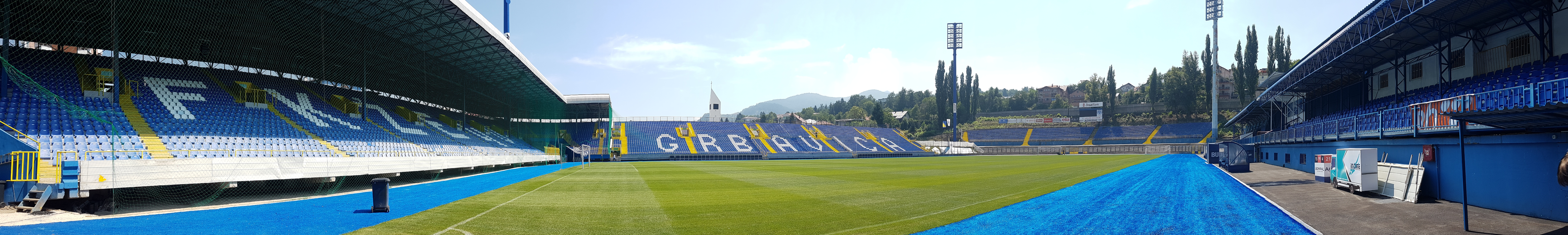
A panoramic view of Grbavica Stadium

=== Coaching staff ===
Name	Role
(Bosnia and Herzegovina) Amar Osim	Head coach
(Bosnia and Herzegovina) Almir Memić	Assistant coach
(Bosnia and Herzegovina) Adin Mulaosmanović	Assistant coach
(Bosnia and Herzegovina) Bakir Šerbo	Assistant coach
(Bosnia and Herzegovina) Adnan Gušo	Goalkeeping coach
(Bosnia and Herzegovina) Anel Hidić	Fitness coach
(Bosnia and Herzegovina) Nedim Čović	Fitness coach
(Bosnia and Herzegovina) Elvis Karić	Head scout
(Bosnia and Herzegovina) Raif Zeba	Physiotherapist
(Bosnia and Herzegovina) Mirza Halvadžija	Physiotherapist
(Bosnia and Herzegovina) Emin Džaferović	Physiotherapist
(Bosnia and Herzegovina) Erdijan Pekić	Commissioner for Security
(Bosnia and Herzegovina) Zlatko Dervišević	Doctor
(Bosnia and Herzegovina) Mahir Moro	Doctor

=== Other information ===
Honorary Chairman of the Club	(Socialist Federal Republic of Yugoslavia) (Bosnia and Herzegovina) Ivica Osim
Chairman of the Board	(Bosnia and Herzegovina) Admir Džubur
Chairman of the Assembly	(Bosnia and Herzegovina) Ermin Čengić
Chairman of the Supervisory Board	(Bosnia and Herzegovina) Damir Ablaković
Director	(Bosnia and Herzegovina) Enis Džihanić
Head coach	(Bosnia and Herzegovina) Amar Osim
Ground (capacity and dimensions)	Grbavica Stadium (13,146 / 105x66 m)

Source: FK Željezničar and Grbavica Stadium

=== Sponsorship ===
As of 21 May 2020

Name	Type
(United Kingdom) Admiral Casino	Gold sponsor
(Bosnia and Herzegovina) Lutrija BiH	Gold sponsor
(Bosnia and Herzegovina) Sarajevo osiguranje	Gold sponsor
(Bosnia and Herzegovina) Domod	Blue Sponsor
(Bosnia and Herzegovina) nLogic	Blue Sponsor
(Bosnia and Herzegovina) Telemach	Blue sponsor
(Bosnia and Herzegovina) Adriatic osiguranje	Sponsor
(Bosnia and Herzegovina) Amko komerc	Sponsor
(Bosnia and Herzegovina) Aperto	Sponsor
(Bosnia and Herzegovina) BBI	Sponsor
(Bosnia and Herzegovina) BH Passport	Sponsor
(Bosnia and Herzegovina) BioMedicalab	Sponsor
(Bosnia and Herzegovina) Ćevabdžinica Mrkva	Sponsor
(Bosnia and Herzegovina) Central osiguranje	Sponsor
(Bosnia and Herzegovina) CPE	Sponsor
(Croatia) Deep Relief	Sponsor
(Bosnia and Herzegovina) Deny-Prom	Sponsor
(Bosnia and Herzegovina) Exclusive Change (EXC)	Sponsor
(Bosnia and Herzegovina) Eko-sir Puđa	Sponsor
(Bosnia and Herzegovina) Elpi	Sponsor
(Bosnia and Herzegovina) Emado	Sponsor
(Slovenia) Europlakat	Sponsor
(Bosnia and Herzegovina) Eurofarm	Sponsor
(Bosnia and Herzegovina) Farmavita	Sponsor
(Croatia) Franck	Sponsor
(Bosnia and Herzegovina) FIS	Sponsor
(Bosnia and Herzegovina) Gadžo Comerc	Sponsor
(Bosnia and Herzegovina) Hadžo stil	Sponsor
(Bosnia and Herzegovina) Hotel Grad	Sponsor
(Bosnia and Herzegovina) Hotel Hills	Sponsor
(Italy) Indesit	Sponsor
(Bosnia and Herzegovina) Imtec	Sponsor
(Bosnia and Herzegovina) In Time	Sponsor
(Bosnia and Herzegovina) Kristal	Sponsor
(Bosnia and Herzegovina) KupiTehniku	Sponsor
(Italy) Manuel Caffè	Sponsor
(France) MGallery Tarčin Forest Resort	Sponsor
(Bosnia and Herzegovina) Milkos	Sponsor
(Bosnia and Herzegovina) Mliječna industrija 99	Sponsor
(Bosnia and Herzegovina) NEBI	Sponsor
(Croatia) Nexe	Sponsor
(Slovenia) NLB Banka	Sponsor
(France) Novotel	Sponsor
(Bosnia and Herzegovina) ProTeam	Sponsor
(Austria) (Switzerland) Rail Cargo Logistics	Sponsor
(Bosnia and Herzegovina) Roco commerce	Sponsor
(Bosnia and Herzegovina) Rooster	Sponsor
(Bosnia and Herzegovina) Sarajevski kiseljak	Sponsor
(Bosnia and Herzegovina) Sarajevsko pivo	Sponsor
(Bosnia and Herzegovina) SBC	Sponsor
(Sweden) Securitas	Sponsor
(Bosnia and Herzegovina) Senigor	Sponsor
(Czech Republic) Škoda	Sponsor
(Croatia) Sky Cola	Sponsor
(Bosnia and Herzegovina) Slatko i slano	Sponsor
(Bosnia and Herzegovina) Sunrise	Sponsor
(Bosnia and Herzegovina) Svjetlostkomerc	Sponsor
(Germany) (Bosnia and Herzegovina) Transportbeton Kiseljak	Sponsor
(Bosnia and Herzegovina) Unigradnja	Sponsor
(United Kingdom) (Netherlands) Unilever	Sponsor
(Bosnia and Herzegovina) Vivia	Sponsor
(Bosnia and Herzegovina) Vitinika	Sponsor
(United States) Whirlpool	Sponsor
(Austria) Tondach Wienerbeger	Sponsor
(Bosnia and Herzegovina) Winner Project	Sponsor
(Bosnia and Herzegovina) General Logistic	Technical sponsor
(Italy) Macron	Technical sponsor
(United Kingdom) Umbro	Technical sponsor
(Bosnia and Herzegovina) 1921	Media partner
(Bosnia and Herzegovina) BiH	Media partner
(Bosnia and Herzegovina) Hayat	Media partner
(Bosnia and Herzegovina) Antena Sarajevo	Media partner
(Bosnia and Herzegovina) Sport1	Media partner
(Bosnia and Herzegovina) Klix	Media partner
(Bosnia and Herzegovina) Dnevni avaz	Media partner
(Bosnia and Herzegovina) Emado	Community partner
(Bosnia and Herzegovina) MFS-Emmaus	Community partner
(Bosnia and Herzegovina) Ruku na srce	Community partner
(Bosnia and Herzegovina) SUMERO	Community partner

== Competitions ==
=== Pre-season ===
22 June 2019 Friendly	Željezničar (Bosnia and Herzegovina)	0–0	(Bosnia and Herzegovina) Mladost Doboj Kakanj	Sarajevo
18:30		Report		Stadium: Grbavica Stadium

28 June 2019 Friendly	Troglav 1918 Livno (Bosnia and Herzegovina)	1–3	(Bosnia and Herzegovina) Željezničar	Livno
18:30	Krezo 81'	Report	Dacić 2', 53'; Jelović 84'	Stadium: Stadion Zgona

29 June 2019 Friendly	Kamešnica (Bosnia and Herzegovina)	0–10	(Bosnia and Herzegovina) Željezničar	Livno
18:30		Report	Alispahić 5'; A. Zec 6', 27'; Ramović 17' (pen.), 38'; Zajmović 18'; Bojo 46'; Osmanković 60'; Krpić 68' (pen.); Dacić 85'	Stadium: Stadion Bilino polje

30 June 2019 Friendly	Željezničar (Bosnia and Herzegovina)	0–1	(Croatia) Varaždin	Livno
18:30		Report	Brlečić 17'	Stadium: Stadion Zgona

4 July 2019 Friendly	Široki Brijeg (Bosnia and Herzegovina)	1–1	(Bosnia and Herzegovina) Željezničar	Široki Brijeg
20:30	Vukoja 83'	Report	Ramović 66'	Stadium: Pecara Stadium

13 July 2019 Friendly	Željezničar (Bosnia and Herzegovina)	0–1	(Bosnia and Herzegovina) Velež	Hrasnica
18:30		Report	Berisha 52'	Stadium: Stadion Hrasnica

14 July 2019 Friendly	Famos Hrasnica (Bosnia and Herzegovina)	0–12	(Bosnia and Herzegovina) Željezničar	Hrasnica
15:30		Report	A. Zec 4', 12', 38'; Zajmović 17', 32'; Ramović 29', 33', 47'; Subašić 61'; Mehić 67' (pen.); Aljić 71'; Salanović 85'	Stadium: Stadion Hrasnica

17 July 2019 Friendly	Željezničar (Bosnia and Herzegovina)	7–0	(Bosnia and Herzegovina) Famos Hrasnica	Sarajevo
18:30	Mehić (pen.); Veselinović; A. Zec; Zajmović	Report		Stadium: Grbavica Stadium

=== Mid-season ===
24 July 2019 Friendly	Željezničar (Bosnia and Herzegovina)	3–0	(Bosnia and Herzegovina) Slavija	Sarajevo
18:30	Krpić 9'; Veselinović 57'; Sadiković 87'	Report		Stadium: Grbavica Stadium

31 July 2019 Friendly	Željezničar (Bosnia and Herzegovina)	1–1	(Bosnia and Herzegovina) TOŠK Tešanj	Sarajevo
18:30	Zajmović 43'	Report	Poturalić	Stadium: Grbavica Stadium

14 August 2019 Friendly	Željezničar (Bosnia and Herzegovina)	8–0	(Bosnia and Herzegovina) Kiseljak	Sarajevo
18:00	Mehić 8'; Ramović 14', 38', 54'; Subašić; Zajmović 31', 36'; Dacić	Report		Stadium: Grbavica Stadium

21 August 2019 Friendly	Željezničar (Bosnia and Herzegovina)	10–0	(Bosnia and Herzegovina) Sutjeska Foča	Sarajevo
18:00	Veselinović 4'; Bogičević 11'; Ramović 14'; A. Zec 43'; Dacić 45'; Zajmović 59', 89'; Krpić 78' (pen.); Sadiković 80'; Sipović 90'	Report		Stadium: Grbavica Stadium

8 September 2019 Friendly	Jedinstvo Bihać (Bosnia and Herzegovina)	0–6	(Bosnia and Herzegovina) Željezničar	Bihać
17:30		Report	Sipović 23'; Krpić 39' (pen.); Mujezinović 48'; Remić 51' (o.g.); Ramović 53'; A. Zec 71'	Stadium: Pod Borićima Stadium

11 September 2019 Friendly	Kiseljak (Bosnia and Herzegovina)	0–10	(Bosnia and Herzegovina) Željezničar	Kiseljak
17:00		Report	Štilić; Zajmović; Mladen Veselinović; Krpić; Alispahić	Stadium: Stadion hrvatskih branitelja

12 October 2019 Friendly	Hajduk Orašje (Bosnia and Herzegovina)	0–12	(Bosnia and Herzegovina) Željezničar	Orašje
15:00		Report	Štilić 8'; E. Zec 26', 44'; Sipović 33'; Mujezinović 48'; A. Zec 58', 81', 87'; Zajmović 66', 78'; Hajdarević 73', 83'	Stadium: Gradski stadion

13 October 2019 Friendly	Bosna Kalesija (Bosnia and Herzegovina)	0–2	(Bosnia and Herzegovina) Željezničar	Kalesija
15:30		Report	Ramović 6' (pen.); Sadiković 78'	Stadium: Gradski stadion

6 November 2019 Friendly	Željezničar (Bosnia and Herzegovina)	7–1	(Bosnia and Herzegovina) Igman Ilidža	Sarajevo
14:30	Mujezinović; Zajmović; Stanić; Štilić; Sadiković ?? (o.g.)	Report	Demirović	Stadium: Grbavica Stadium

17 November 2019 Friendly	Željezničar (Bosnia and Herzegovina)	3–3	(Bosnia and Herzegovina) Krupa	Sarajevo
14:00	Lukić 17', 27'; Puzigaća 88' (pen.)	Report	Mujezinović 46'; Krpić 82', 86'	Stadium: Grbavica Stadium

21 January 2020 Friendly	Željezničar (Bosnia and Herzegovina)	1–2	(Bosnia and Herzegovina) Velež	Međugorje
14:00	Bojo 23'	Report	Hasanović 2'; Cvijanović 65'

25 January 2020 Friendly	Široki Brijeg (Bosnia and Herzegovina)	1–1	(Bosnia and Herzegovina) Željezničar	Široki Brijeg
14:30	Kvesić 48'	Report	Zajmović 58'	Stadium: Pecara Stadium

29 January 2020 Friendly	Željezničar (Bosnia and Herzegovina)	2–1	(Croatia) Rudeš	Međugorje
14:30	Ikić 61'; Stanić 83' (pen.)	Report	Jurić 80'

3 February 2020 Friendly	Olimpija Ljubljana (Slovenia)	6–3	(Bosnia and Herzegovina) Željezničar	Antalya
15:30	Bagnack 52'; Menalo 54', 57', 72'; Vukušić 67'; Valenčić 88'	Report	Štilić 16' (pen.), 62' (pen.); Lendrić 43'

5 February 2020 Friendly	Željezničar (Bosnia and Herzegovina)	2–2	(Russia) Akhmat Grozny	Antalya
15:00	Lendrić 67'; Štilić 81'	Report	Mitrishev 47', 70'

6 February 2020 Friendly	Željezničar (Bosnia and Herzegovina)	1–1	(Serbia) Proleter Novi Sad	Antalya
15:00	Sadiković 80'	Report	Babić 57'

10 February 2020 Friendly	Zorya Luhansk (Ukraine)	4–0	(Bosnia and Herzegovina) Željezničar	Antalya
15:30	Khomchenovskyi 23'; Kocherhin 29', 62'; Lyednyev 40'	Report

15 February 2020 Friendly	Zrinjski (Bosnia and Herzegovina)	0–0	(Bosnia and Herzegovina) Željezničar	Međugorje
14:45		Report

=== Overall ===
Competition	Started round	Final result	First match	Last Match
Premijer Liga BiH	—	2nd	20 July 2019	8 March 2020
Kup BiH	Round of 32	Semi-finals	18 September 2019	4 March 2020

=== League table ===
Pos	Team	Pld	W	D	L	GF	GA	GD	Pts	Qualification or relegation
1	Sarajevo (C)	22	13	6	3	38	19	+19	45	Qualification for the Champions League first qualifying round
2	Željezničar	22	12	6	4	43	21	+22	42	Qualification for the Europa League first qualifying round
3	Zrinjski Mostar	22	11	5	6	30	12	+18	38	Qualification for the Europa League first qualifying round
4	Borac Banja Luka	22	10	6	6	29	23	+6	36	Qualification for the Europa League first qualifying round
5	Tuzla City	22	10	5	7	27	29	−2	35	

Source: Rezultati.com
Rules for classification: 1) Points; 2) Goal difference; 3) Goals scored; 4) Head-to-head points; 5) Head-to-head goal difference; 6) Head-to-head away goals (only if two teams); 7) Head-to-head goals scored; 8) Goal difference; 9) Play-off. (Criteria 2 and 3 are not used to decide champion, UEFA competition qualification, or relegation)
(C) Champions

==== Results summary ====
Overall								Home						Away					
Pld	W	D	L	GF	GA	GD	Pts	W	D	L	GF	GA	GD	W	D	L	GF	GA	GD
22	12	6	4	43	21	+22	42	7	2	2	22	9	+13	5	4	2	21	12	+9

Last updated: complete.
Source: Sportsport.ba

==== Results by round ====
Round	1	2	3	4	5	6	7	8	9	10	11	12	13	14	15	16	17	18	19	20	21	22
Ground	H	A	H	A	H	A	H	A	H	H	A	A	H	A	H	A	H	A	H	A	A	H
Result	D	W	W	W	D	D	W	D	W	W	D	L	W	L	W	W	L	W	L	D	W	W
Position	6	1	2	1	1	2	1	3	2	1	1	3	2	2	2	1	2	1	2	2	2	2
Points	1	4	7	10	11	12	15	16	19	22	23	23	26	26	29	32	32	35	35	36	39	42

Source: Competitions
A = Away; H = Home; W = Win; D = Draw; L = Loss

==== Matches ====
20 July 2019 1	Željezničar	0–0	Borac	Sarajevo
20:30	Bojo (yellow card) 49' (yellow-red card) 80'; Alispahić (yellow card) 51'; Stevanović (yellow card) 86'	Report	Janičić (yellow card) 45'; Jovanović (yellow card) 65'	Stadium: Grbavica Stadium; Attendance: 5,350; Referee: Sabrija Topalović (Zenica)

27 July 2019 2	Mladost Doboj Kakanj	0–2	Željezničar	Doboj
17:30	Isaković (yellow card) 5'; Hasić (yellow card) 22'; Fanimo (yellow card) 64'	Report	Osmanković (yellow card) 7'; Sipović (yellow card) 48'; A. Zec 50'; Stanić (yellow card) 64'; Krpić 78'; Veselinović (yellow card) 82'	Stadium: MGM Farm Arena; Attendance: 1,500; Referee: Goran Paradžik (Ljubuški)

4 August 2019 3	Željezničar	1–0	Zrinjski	Sarajevo
20:00	Alispahić (yellow card) 28'; Sipović (yellow card) 34'; Veselinović (yellow card) 38'; Krpić 59'	Report	Stojkić (yellow card) 24'; Zlomislić (yellow card) 58'; Kadušić (yellow card) 75'; Jakovljević (yellow card) 76'	Stadium: Grbavica Stadium; Attendance: 7,700; Referee: Dragan Petrović (Banja Luka)

10 August 2019 4	Čelik	0–2	Željezničar	Zenica
19:00	Dedić (yellow card) 41'; Blažević (yellow card) 61'; Isić (yellow card) 84'	Report	Krpić 49', 71', (yellow card) 81'; Sipović (yellow card) 60'; Stanić (yellow card) 73'; Alispahić (yellow card) 75'	Stadium: Bilino Polje Stadium; Attendance: 12,000; Referee: Elvis Mujić (Banovići)

17 August 2019 5	Željezničar	2–2	Sloboda Tuzla	Sarajevo
20:30	Bogičević 18'; Sadiković 45+1'; Stevanović (yellow card) 56'	Report	Ristić (yellow card) 6'; Bekrić 30'; Bekić (yellow card) 34'; Hodžić 80', (yellow card) 86'; Lakić (yellow card) 90'	Stadium: Grbavica Stadium; Attendance: 6,071; Referee: Ermin Sivac (Zenica)

24 August 2019 6	Široki Brijeg	3–3	Željezničar	Široki Brijeg
20:00	Yenin 2'; Jović 23' (pen.); Kvesić 32', (yellow card) 43'; Ćorić (yellow card) 69'; Matić (yellow card) 74'	Report	Krpić 6'; Stevanović (yellow card) 22'; Veselinović 62'; E. Zec 74'	Stadium: Pecara Stadium; Attendance: 1,500; Referee: Dragan Petrović (Banja Luka)

31 August 2019 7	Željezničar	5–2	Sarajevo	Sarajevo
20:00	Krpić 7', 38'; Bojo 59'; Sadiković 76'; Alispahić 90+2'	Report	Hebibović 1'; Sipović 45+1' (o.g.); Šerbečić (yellow card) 54'; Đokanović (yellow card) 58'; Gavrić (yellow card) 58'; Letić (yellow card) 76'	Stadium: Grbavica Stadium; Attendance: 11,017; Referee: Haris Kaljanac (Sarajevo)

14 September 2019 8	Velež	1–1	Željezničar	Mostar
16:30	Ćosić (yellow card) 4'; Brandao 25'; Fajić (yellow card) 45+1' (yellow-red card) 81'; Behram (yellow card) 51'; Hasanović (yellow card) 55'; Urdinov (yellow card) 61'	Report	Sadiković (yellow card) 7'; Pavić (yellow card) 14'; Bojo 59'; Osmanković (yellow card) 64'	Stadium: Stadion Rođeni; Attendance: 3,500; Referee: Ermin Sivac (Zenica)

21 September 2019 9	Željezničar	1–0	Radnik	Sarajevo
19:30	Stevanović (yellow card) 55'; Alispahić 65'	Report	Karić (yellow card) 26'; Radović (yellow card) 27'	Stadium: Grbavica Stadium; Attendance: 3,623; Referee: Luka Bilbija (Prijedor)

25 September 2019 10	Željezničar	6–0	Zvijezda 09	Sarajevo
20:00	Sipović 19', (yellow card) 80'; Vojinović 31' (o.g.); Štilić 37'; Ramović (yellow card) 45'; Zajmović 52', (yellow card) 78'; Hajdarević 73'; A. Zec 81'	Report		Stadium: Grbavica Stadium; Attendance: 3,048; Referee: Frano Jelić (Široki Brijeg)

28 September 2019 11	Tuzla City	2–2	Željezničar	Tuzla
16:00	Crnkić 11', (yellow card) 50'; Kojić 57'	Report	Krpić 15', 77' (pen.); Sipović (yellow card) 80'; Štilić (yellow card) 89'; Ramović (yellow card) 90+1'	Stadium: Tušanj City Stadium; Attendance: 3,000; Referee: Zoran Grbić (Prijedor)

6 October 2019 12	Borac	3–0	Željezničar	Banja Luka
17:30	Kajkut (yellow card) 8', (goal) 9'; Dujaković (yellow card) 46'; Mirić 85'; Jovanović 90+1'	Report	Alispahić (yellow card) 22'; Osmanković (yellow card) 30'; Stevanović (yellow card) 37'; Pavić (yellow card) 39'	Stadium: Banja Luka City Stadium; Attendance: 6,500; Referee: Vladimir Bjelica (East Sarajevo)

19 October 2019 13	Željezničar	2–1	Mladost Doboj Kakanj	Sarajevo
18:00	Sadiković (yellow card) 16'; Štilić 54', (yellow card) 78'; Pavić (yellow card) 65'; Krpić 70'; Ramović (yellow card) 83'	Report	Smajlagić (yellow card) 2'; Hasić (yellow card) 23'; Horić (yellow card) 32'; Fanimo 38'; Begić (yellow card) 57'; Hiroš (yellow card) 66'	Stadium: Grbavica Stadium; Attendance: 4,023; Referee: Aleksandar Njegomirović (Prnjavor)

26 October 2019 14	Zrinjski	2–1	Željezničar	Mostar
14:30	Kunić 35', 80'; Gojković (yellow card) 43'; Rustemović (yellow card) 63'; Barbarić (yellow card) 79'	Report	Stevanović (yellow card) 55'; Štilić 56'; Sadiković (yellow card) 65'	Stadium: Stadion pod Bijelim Brijegom; Attendance: 3,000; Referee: Dragan Petrović (Banja Luka)

3 November 2019 15	Željezničar	3–0	Čelik	Sarajevo
16:30		Report		Stadium: Grbavica Stadium

9 November 2019 16	Sloboda Tuzla	0–4	Željezničar	Tuzla
16:30		Report	Osmanković 15', (yellow card) 64'; Sipović (yellow card) 30'; Ramović (yellow card) 43'; Štilić 52'; Krpić 78'; Zajmović 90'	Stadium: Tušanj City Stadium; Attendance: 2,500; Referee: Dragan Petrović (Banja Luka)

24 November 2019 17	Željezničar	1–2	Široki Brijeg	Sarajevo
16:00	Bogičević (yellow card) 18'; Štilić 42'; Osmanković (yellow card) 52'	Report	Bagarić 34'; Ćorić 90' (pen.)	Stadium: Grbavica Stadium; Attendance: 4,574; Referee: Vladimir Bjelica (East Sarajevo)

30 November 2019 18	Sarajevo	1–3	Željezničar	Sarajevo
16:00	Oremuš (yellow card) 9'; Ahmetović 12'; Rahmanović (yellow card) 16'; Lazić (yellow card) 28'; Husref Musemić (yellow card) 45+2'; Hodžić (yellow card) 70'; Šerbečić (yellow card) 75' (yellow-red card) 88'; Tatar (yellow card) 78'; Bojan Letić (yellow card) 90+2'	Report	Sipović (yellow card) 21'; Adnan Gušo (red card) 28'; Štilić 30', 70' (pen.), (yellow card) 49'; Alispahić (yellow card) 34'; Ramović (yellow card) 42'; Amar Osim (yellow card) 45+1'; Osmanković (yellow card) 45+4'; Stevanović (yellow card) 45+4'; Krpić 46'; Stanić (yellow card) 64'; Bojo (yellow card) 90+5'	Stadium: Asim Ferhatović Hase Stadium; Attendance: 15,000; Referee: Haris Kaljanac (Sarajevo)

7 December 2019 19	Željezničar	0–2	Velež	Sarajevo
16:00	Veselinović (yellow card) 53'; Sipović (yellow card) 81'	Report	Fajić 21'; Zvonić (yellow card) 23'; Hasanović (yellow card) 59'; Čivić 68'; Vehabović (yellow card) 90'	Stadium: Grbavica Stadium; Attendance: 5,723; Referee: Luka Bilbija (Prijedor)

22 February 2020 20	Radnik	0–0	Željezničar	Bijeljina
14:30	Simonović (yellow card) 54'	Report	Pavić (yellow card) 13'; Kosorić (yellow card) 88'	Stadium: Gradski stadion Attendance: 1,300; Referee: Dragan Petrović (Banja Luka)

29 February 2020 21	Zvijezda 09	0–3	Željezničar	Ugljevik
14:30	Mandić (yellow card) 43'	Report	Janković 19' (o.g.); Sadiković (yellow card) 37'; Ramović 39'; Lendrić 58'; Bojo (yellow card) 68'	Stadium: Ugljevik City Stadium; Attendance: 400; Referee: Luka Bilbija (Prijedor)

8 March 2020 22	Željezničar	1–0	Tuzla City	Sarajevo
18:00	Štilić 50'; Stevanović (yellow card) 75'; Alispahić (yellow card) 90'	Report	Kostić (yellow card) 37' (yellow-red card) 48'; Crnkić (yellow card) 86'	Stadium: Grbavica Stadium; Attendance: 6,048; Referee: Sabrija Topalović (Zenica)

=== Kup BiH ===
==== Round of 32 ====
18 September 2019	Tekstilac Derventa	0–3	Željezničar	Derventa
16:30	Zarić (yellow card) 55'; Rudan (yellow card) 75'	Report	Sadiković 22'; Ramović 35'; Stanić (yellow card) 61'; Hajdarević (yellow card) 74'; A. Zec 83' (pen.)	Stadium: Gradski Stadion; Attendance: 600; Referee: Aleksandar Njegomirović (Prnjavor)

==== Round of 16 ====
2 October 2019	Željezničar	6–1	Mladost Doboj Kakanj	Sarajevo
18:00	Zajmović 22', 72'; A. Zec 28', 79'; Hasić 59' (o.g.); Veselinović 75'; Osmanković (yellow card) 81'	Report	Yamac (yellow card) 33'; Mujarić 64'	Stadium: Grbavica Stadium; Attendance: 2,753; Referee: Aleksandar Njegomirović (Prnjavor)

==== Quarter-finals ====
4 March 2020	Borac	0–2	Željezničar	Banja Luka
18:00	Dujaković (yellow card) 41'; Radulović (yellow card) 50'; Mirić (yellow card) 83'; Jovanović (yellow card) 83'	Report	Stevanović (yellow card) 56'; Jovanović (yellow card) 59'; Janičić 66' (o.g.), (yellow card) 77'; Štilić 70', (yellow card) 83'	Stadium: Banja Luka City Stadium; Attendance: 2,500; Referee: Luka Bilbija (Prijedor)
