= 2015–16 FK Sarajevo season =

Sarajevo
2015–16 season
- Owner: Vincent Tan
- Chairman: Edis Kusturica
- Manager: Dženan Uščuplić (until 11 September); Almir Hurtić (from 11 to 23 September); Miodrag Ješić (from 23 September to 16 March); Almir Hurtić (from 16 March)
- Stadium: Asim Ferhatović Hase Stadium
- Premier League BiH: 4th
- Cup of BiH: Quarter–finals
- UEFA Champions League: Second qualifying round
- Top goalscorer: League: Leon Benko (18); All: Leon Benko (20)
- Highest home attendance: 18,000 vs Lech Poznań (14 July 2015)
- Lowest home attendance: 1,000 vs Olimpic (15 May 2016)
- Average home league attendance: 5,010
- Biggest win: Sarajevo 6–1 Drina (27 July 2015)
- Biggest defeat: Sloboda 4–0 Sarajevo (7 May 2016)

The 2015–16 Sarajevo season was the club's 67th season in history, and their 22nd consecutive season in the top flight of Bosnian football, the Premier League of BiH. Besides competing in the Premier League, the team competed in the National Cup and the qualifications for UEFA Champions League.

== Squad information ==
=== First-team squad ===
As of 3 March 2016

Note: Flags indicate national team as defined under FIFA eligibility rules; some limited exceptions apply. Players may hold more than one non-FIFA nationality.

| No. | Pos. | Nation | Player |
|---|---|---|---|
| 1 | GK | BIH | Emir Plakalo (3rd captain) |
| 2 | GK | CRO | Matej Delač (on loan from Chelsea) |
| 4 | MF | BIH | Edin Rustemović (vice-captain) |
| 6 | DF | BIH | Adnan Kovačević |
| 7 | MF | BIH | Haris Duljević (captain) |
| 8 | FW | BIH | Amer Bekić |
| 9 | FW | BIH | Ševko Okić |
| 10 | MF | BRA | Emerson Reis Luiz |
| 13 | FW | BRA | César Augusto Hermenegildo |
| 15 | DF | SVN | Denis Kramar |
| 16 | DF | BIH | Marko Mihojević |

| No. | Pos. | Nation | Player |
|---|---|---|---|
| 19 | DF | BIH | Almir Bekić |
| 21 | FW | CRO | Leon Benko |
| 23 | DF | BIH | Džemal Berberović |
| 25 | DF | CRO | Tomislav Barbarić |
| 28 | FW | BIH | Haris Harba (on loan from Vysočina Jihlava) |
| 29 | MF | SRB | Damjan Krajišnik |
| 30 | GK | SRB | Bojan Pavlović |
| 55 | DF | SYR | Ahmad Kalasi |
| 88 | MF | BIH | Samir Radovac (4th captain) |
| 92 | MF | CRO | Deni Simeunović |

=== Youth academy players ===
FK Sarajevo Academy players that received a first-team squad call-up.

| No. | Pos. | Nation | Player |
|---|---|---|---|
| 3 | DF | BIH | Advan Kadušić |
| 5 | DF | BIH | Nihad Mujakić |
| 14 | DF | BIH | Edvin Rastoder |
| 17 | MF | BIH | Elvedin Herić |
| 22 | GK | BIH | Ivan Trifković |

| No. | Pos. | Nation | Player |
|---|---|---|---|
| 69 | FW | BIH | Adnan Osmanović |
| 69 | MF | BIH | Demirel Veladžić |
| 77 | MF | BIH | Anes Vazda |
| 79 | MF | BIH | Vedad Gljiva |
| 99 | FW | BIH | Hamza Čataković |

== Transfers ==
=== In ===
| Date | Pos. | Player | From | Fee | Ref. |
|---|---|---|---|---|---|
| 10 June 2015 | DF | (Bosnia and Herzegovina) Almir Bekić | (Bosnia and Herzegovina) Sloboda Tuzla | Free transfer | |
| 11 June 2015 | MF | (Bosnia and Herzegovina) Anel Hebibović | (Bosnia and Herzegovina) Velež Mostar | Free transfer | |
| 15 June 2015 | FW | (Bosnia and Herzegovina) Ildar Klarić | (Bosnia and Herzegovina) Zrinjski Mostar | Free transfer | |
| 26 June 2015 | DF | (Serbia) Milan Stepanov | (Cyprus) Omonia | Free transfer | |
| 27 June 2015 | MF | (Bosnia and Herzegovina) Rijad Kobiljar | (United States) Jacksonville Dolphins | Free transfer | |
| 27 June 2015 | DF | (Croatia) Tomislav Barbarić | (Croatia) Split | Free transfer | |
| 9 July 2015 | MF | (Nigeria) Harmony Ikande | (Israel) Hapoel Tel Aviv | Free transfer | |
| 17 October 2015 | GK | (Serbia) Bojan Pavlović | (Georgia (country)) Zestafoni | Free transfer | |
| 24 November 2015 | MF | (Brazil) Emerson | (Myanmar) Yangon United | Free transfer | |
| 24 November 2015 | FW | (Brazil) Cezar Augusto | (Myanmar) Yangon United | Free transfer | |
| 22 December 2015 | MF | (Croatia) Deni Simeunović | (Bosnia and Herzegovina) Zrinjski Mostar | Free transfer | |
| 23 January 2016 | DF | (Slovenia) Denis Kramar | (Australia) Perth Glory | Free transfer | |
| 4 February 2016 | MF | (Serbia) Damjan Krajišnik | (Serbia) Partizan U19 | Free transfer | |

=== Out ===
| Date | Pos. | Player | To | Fee | Ref. |
|---|---|---|---|---|---|
| 1 June 2016 | GK | (Bosnia and Herzegovina) Dejan Bandović | (Bosnia and Herzegovina) Olimpik | End of contract | |
| 1 June 2016 | FW | (Bosnia and Herzegovina) Alem Plakalo | (Bosnia and Herzegovina) Travnik | End of contract | |
| 1 June 2016 | GK | (Croatia) Marko Ivkić | (Bosnia and Herzegovina) Orašje | End of contract | |
| 1 June 2016 | MF | (Bosnia and Herzegovina) Haris Muharemović | (Bosnia and Herzegovina) Bosna Visoko | End of contract | |
| 15 June 2015 | DF | (North Macedonia) Risto Mitrevski | (North Macedonia) Metalurg Skopje | Contract termination | |
| 18 June 2015 | FW | (Bosnia and Herzegovina) Nemanja Bilbija | (Croatia) Split | End of contract | |
| 1 July 2015 | MF | (Bosnia and Herzegovina) Adnan Hrelja | (Bosnia and Herzegovina) Mladost Doboj Kakanj | Contract termination | |
| 29 July 2015 | DF | (Croatia) Andria Petrović | (Bosnia and Herzegovina) Sloga Ljubuški | Contract termination | |
| 12 August 2015 | MF | (Serbia) Miloš Stojčev | (Greece) Atromitos | €200,000 | |
| 18 August 2015 | MF | (Bosnia and Herzegovina) Gojko Cimirot | (Greece) PAOK | €1,680,000 | |
| 4 December 2015 | DF | (Bosnia and Herzegovina) Mario Barić | (Serbia) Vitez | Contract termination | |
| 7 December 2015 | MF | (Nigeria) Harmony Ikande | (Israel) Maccabi Yavne | Contract termination | |
| 20 December 2015 | DF | (Serbia) Radoš Protić | (Serbia) Rad | Contract termination | |
| 21 December 2015 | GK | (Bosnia and Herzegovina) Senedin Oštraković | Free agent | Contract termination | |
| 22 December 2015 | DF | (Serbia) Ivan Tatomirović | (Finland) HJK Helsinki | Contract termination | |
| 24 December 2015 | DF | (Bosnia and Herzegovina) Bojan Puzigaća | (Serbia) Voždovac | Contract termination | |
| 28 December 2015 | MF | (Bosnia and Herzegovina) Rijad Kobiljar | (Bosnia and Herzegovina) Olimpik | Contract termination | |
| 28 December 2015 | MF | (Bosnia and Herzegovina) Amar Burović | Free agent | Contract termination | |
| 30 December 2015 | DF | (Serbia) Milan Stepanov | (Serbia) Vojvodina | Contract termination | |
| 8 January 2016 | MF | (Bosnia and Herzegovina) Nemanja Anđušić | (Bosnia and Herzegovina) Olimpik | Contract termination | |
| 11 January 2016 | MF | (Serbia) Miroljub Kostić | (Serbia) Borac Čačak | Contract termination | |
| 11 January 2016 | MF | (Bosnia and Herzegovina) Mehmed Alispahić | (Croatia) Šibenik | Contract termination | |
| 19 February 2016 | MF | (Ivory Coast) Germain Kouadio | (Bosnia and Herzegovina) Travnik | Contract termination | |
| 3 March 2016 | FW | (North Macedonia) Krste Velkoski | (South Korea) Incheon United | €175,000 | |
| Total | | | | €2,050,000 | |

=== Loans in ===
| Start date | End date | Pos. | Player | From | Ref. |
|---|---|---|---|---|---|
| 7 August 2015 | End of season | GK | (Croatia) Matej Delač | (England) Chelsea | |
| 19 February 2016 | End of season | FW | (Bosnia and Herzegovina) Haris Harba | (Czech Republic) Vysočina Jihlava | |

=== Loans out ===
| Start date | End date | Pos. | Player | To | Ref. |
|---|---|---|---|---|---|
| 29 July 2015 | 31 December 2015 | MF | (Bosnia and Herzegovina) Nemanja Anđušić | (Bosnia and Herzegovina) Travnik | |
| 29 July 2015 | 31 December 2015 | MF | (Bosnia and Herzegovina) Rijad Kobiljar | (Bosnia and Herzegovina) Travnik | |
| 29 July 2015 | 31 December 2015 | MF | (Ivory Coast) Germain Kouadio | (Bosnia and Herzegovina) Travnik | |
| 4 August 2015 | 31 December 2015 | MF | (Serbia) Miroljub Kostić | (Serbia) Novi Pazar | |
| 5 August 2015 | 31 December 2015 | MF | (Bosnia and Herzegovina) Amar Burović | (Bosnia and Herzegovina) Bosna Visoko | |
| 5 August 2015 | 31 December 2015 | FW | (Bosnia and Herzegovina) Ildar Klarić | (Bosnia and Herzegovina) Bosna Visoko | |
| 5 August 2015 | End of season | FW | (Bosnia and Herzegovina) Tarik Handžić | (Bosnia and Herzegovina) Bosna Visoko | |
| 19 August 2015 | 31 December 2015 | DF | (Serbia) Radoš Protić | (Serbia) Novi Pazar | |
| 25 January 2016 | End of season | MF | (Bosnia and Herzegovina) Dario Purić | (Bosnia and Herzegovina) Slavija Sarajevo | |
| 28 January 2016 | End of season | MF | (Bosnia and Herzegovina) Anel Hebibović | (Bosnia and Herzegovina) Olimpik | |
| 28 January 2016 | End of season | FW | (Bosnia and Herzegovina) Ildar Klarić | (Bosnia and Herzegovina) Olimpik | |

== Kit ==
| Supplier | Sponsors | |
|---|---|---|
| (Bosnia and Herzegovina) Haad | (Turkey) Turkish Airlines | Front |
| (Bosnia and Herzegovina) Haad | (Saudi Arabia) Al-Shiddi Group | Back |
| (Bosnia and Herzegovina) Haad | visit Malaysia | Shorts |

== Pre-season and friendlies ==
Win Draw Loss Fixtures

| 27 June 2015 Friendly | Borac Jelah (Bosnia and Herzegovina) | 0–5 | (Bosnia and Herzegovina) Sarajevo | Jelah |
| 17:00 CEST (UTC+2) | | | Benko 23'; Alispahić 58'; Duljević 60', 80'; Okić 74' | Stadium: Stadion Šibovi; Attendance: 2,600 |

| 30 June 2015 Friendly | Split (Croatia) | 0–1 | (Bosnia and Herzegovina) Sarajevo | Lesce, Slovenia |
| 17:30 CEST (UTC+2) | | Report | Puzigaća 56' | Stadium: Stadion Lesce; Attendance: 50 |

| 3 July 2015 Friendly | Rijeka (Croatia) | 3–1 | (Bosnia and Herzegovina) Sarajevo | Kranjska Gora, Slovenia |
| 18:00 CEST (UTC+2) | | Report | Benko (yellow card) 12'; Puzigaća 33'; Barbarić (yellow card) 58' | Stadium: Sportski park Rudeč; Attendance: 50; Referee: Znidarsič |

| 7 July 2015 Friendly | Sarajevo (Bosnia and Herzegovina) | 1–3 | (Ukraine) Karpaty Lviv | Krško, Slovenia |
| | Bekić 31' | Report | | Stadium: Matija Gubec Stadium |

| 7 July 2015 Friendly | Sarajevo (Bosnia and Herzegovina) | 0–3 | (Ukraine) Vorskla Poltava | Čatež ob Savi, Slovenia |
| 18:00 CEST (UTC+2) | Stojčev (red card) 55'; Duljević (red card) | | | Stadium: Stadion Brežice |

| 10 July 2015 Friendly | Mladost Doboj Kakanj (Bosnia and Herzegovina) | 1–2 | (Bosnia and Herzegovina) Sarajevo | Doboj |
| 17:30 CEST (UTC+2) | | | Jezerkić 45'; Anđušić 90' | Attendance: 1,200; Referee: Sabrija Topalović (Zenica) |

| 29 July 2015 Friendly | Famos Vojkovići (Bosnia and Herzegovina) | 0–2 | (Bosnia and Herzegovina) Sarajevo | Vojkovići |
| | | | Okić 37'; Ikande 53' | Stadium: Sportski centar Vojkovići; Attendance: 50 |

| 10 October 2015 Friendly | Sarajevo (Bosnia and Herzegovina) | 1–0 | (Serbia) Novi Pazar | Mostar, Herzegovina |
| 15:00 CEST (UTC+2) | Benko 17' | Report | | Stadium: Stadion Vrapčići; Referee: Antonio Bandić (Grude) |

| 14 November 2015 Friendly | Sarajevo (Bosnia and Herzegovina) | 3–3 | (Turkey) Galatasaray | Sarajevo |
| 18:30 CET (UTC+1) | Duljević 27'; Bekić 43', 46'; Barbarić (yellow card) 64' | Report | | Stadium: Asim Hase Ferhatović; Attendance: 7,000; Referee: Irfan Peljto |

| 29 January 2016 Friendly | Sarajevo (Bosnia and Herzegovina) | 4–0 | (Bosnia and Herzegovina) Metalleghe-BSI | Čitluk |
| 13:00 CET (UTC+1) | Barbarić 62'; Bekić 78', 86'; Simeunović 84' | Report | | Stadium: Stadion Čitluk |

| 2 February 2016 Friendly | Brotnjo (Bosnia and Herzegovina) | 1–1 | (Bosnia and Herzegovina) Sarajevo | Čitluk |
| 14:00 CET (UTC+1) | | Report | Hermenegildo 85' | Stadium: Stadion Bare; Attendance: 50; Referee: Goran Paradžik (Ljubuški) |

| 8 February 2016 Friendly | Maribor (Slovenia) | 3–1 | (Bosnia and Herzegovina) Sarajevo | Antalya, Turkey |
| 18:00 CET (UTC+1) | | Report | Duljević 27'; Barbarić (yellow card) 35' | Stadium: SC Sucesi; Attendance: 50; Referee: Hajri Kivanç |

| 12 February 2016 Friendly | Astana (Kazakhstan) | 3–2 | (Bosnia and Herzegovina) Sarajevo | Antalya, Turkey |
| 16:00 CET (UTC+1) | | Report | Benko 45'; Okić 49' |

| 16 February 2016 Friendly | Sarajevo (Bosnia and Herzegovina) | 1–3 | (Kazakhstan) Kairat | Antalya, Turkey |
| 16:00 CET (UTC+1) | Duljević 5' (yellow card); Kadušić (yellow card) | Report | | Attendance: 50 |

| 20 February 2016 Friendly | Travnik (Bosnia and Herzegovina) | 2–2 | (Bosnia and Herzegovina) Sarajevo | Travnik |
| 14:30 CET (UTC+1) | | Report | Hermenegildo 1'; Bekić 25' (yellow card) 41'; Benko (yellow card) 41' | Stadium: Stadion Pirota; Attendance: 700 |

| 26 March 2016 Friendly | TOŠK Tešanj (Bosnia and Herzegovina) | 1–2 | (Bosnia and Herzegovina) Sarajevo | Tešanj |
| 15:30 CET (UTC+1) | | Report | Benko; Harba | Stadium: Gradski stadion Luke (Tešanj) |

== Competitions ==
=== Overview ===
| Competition | First match | Last match | Starting round | Final position | Record | | | | | | | |
| Competition | First match | Last match | Starting round | Final position | Pld | W | D | L | GF | GA | GD | Win % |
|---|---|---|---|---|---|---|---|---|---|---|---|---|
| Premier League | 27 July 2015 | 15 May 2016 | Matchday 1 | 4th | 30 | 18 | 3 | 9 | 56 | 28 | +28 | 60.00 |
| Cup of BiH | 23 September 2015 | 15 March 2016 | First round | Quarter-finals | 5 | 2 | 1 | 2 | 9 | 8 | +1 | 40.00 |
| Champions League | 14 July 2015 | 22 July 2015 | First qualifying round | First qualifying round | 2 | 0 | 0 | 2 | 0 | 3 | −3 | 0.00 |
| Total | | | | | 37 | 20 | 4 | 13 | 65 | 39 | +26 | 54.05 |

Source: Competitions

=== Premier League ===
==== League table ====
| Pos | Team | Pld | W | D | L | GF | GA | GD | Pts | Qualification or relegation |
|---|---|---|---|---|---|---|---|---|---|---|
| 2 | Sloboda Tuzla | 30 | 19 | 5 | 6 | 44 | 23 | +21 | 62 | Qualification for the Europa League first qualifying round |
| 3 | Široki Brijeg | 30 | 18 | 7 | 5 | 56 | 21 | +35 | 61 | Qualification for the Europa League first qualifying round |
| 4 | Sarajevo | 30 | 18 | 3 | 9 | 56 | 28 | +28 | 57 | |
| 5 | Željezničar | 30 | 16 | 7 | 7 | 36 | 20 | +16 | 55 | |
| 6 | Čelik Zenica | 30 | 12 | 10 | 8 | 35 | 28 | +7 | 46 | |

Source: UEFA, Soccerway
Rules for classification: 1) Points; 2) Goal difference; 3) Goals scored; 4) Head-to-head points; 5) Head-to-head goal difference; 6) Head-to-head away goals (only if two teams); 7) Head-to-head goals scored; 8) Goal difference; 9) Play-off. (Criteria 2 and 3 are not used to decide champion, UEFA competition qualification, or relegation)

==== Results summary ====
| Overall | | | | | | | | Home | | | | | | Away | | | | | |
| Pld | W | D | L | GF | GA | GD | Pts | W | D | L | GF | GA | GD | W | D | L | GF | GA | GD |
|---|---|---|---|---|---|---|---|---|---|---|---|---|---|---|---|---|---|---|---|
| 30 | 18 | 3 | 9 | 56 | 28 | +28 | 57 | 12 | 0 | 3 | 35 | 11 | +24 | 6 | 3 | 6 | 21 | 17 | +4 |

Source: sportsport.ba

==== Results by round ====
| Round | 1 | 2 | 3 | 4 | 5 | 6 | 7 | 8 | 9 | 10 | 11 | 12 | 13 | 14 | 15 | 16 | 17 | 18 | 19 | 20 | 21 | 22 | 23 | 24 | 25 | 26 | 27 | 28 | 29 | 30 |
|---|---|---|---|---|---|---|---|---|---|---|---|---|---|---|---|---|---|---|---|---|---|---|---|---|---|---|---|---|---|---|
| Ground | H | A | H | H | A | H | A | H | A | H | A | H | A | H | A | A | H | A | A | H | A | H | A | H | A | H | A | H | A | H |
| Result | W | L | W | L | D | W | L | W | W | W | L | W | L | W | W | W | W | L | D | W | D | W | W | W | W | L | W | W | L | L |
| Position | 1 | 6 | 4 | 6 | 7 | 4 | 7 | 5 | 4 | 2 | 3 | 3 | 5 | 5 | 4 | 4 | 3 | 5 | 5 | 3 | 3 | 3 | 3 | 3 | 3 | 5 | 3 | 3 | 4 | 4 |

Source: Competitions
A = Away; H = Home; W = Win; D = Draw; L = Loss

==== Matches ====
| 27 July 2015 1 | Sarajevo | 6–1 | Drina | Travnik |
| 17:30 CEST (UTC+2) | Senedin Oštraković (yellow card) 12'; Leon Benko (yellow card) 27' (goal) 36'; Mehmed Alispahić 45+1'; Krste Velkoski 59'; Leon Benko 61'; Ševko Okić 72'; Edin Rustemović (yellow card) 89'; Leon Benko 90+2' | Report | | Stadium: Stadion Pirota; Attendance: 4,000; Referee: Emir Spahalić (Mostar) |

| 3 August 2015 2 | Travnik | 1–0 | Sarajevo | Travnik |
| 17:00 CEST (UTC+2) | | Report | Tomislav Barbarić (yellow card) 79'; Senedin Oštraković (yellow card) 87' | Stadium: Stadion Pirota; Attendance: 2,300; Referee: Goran Paradžik (Ljubuški) |

| 9 August 2015 3 | Sarajevo | 2–1 | Široki Brijeg | Sarajevo |
| 17:00 CEST (UTC+2) | Bojan Puzigaća (yellow card) 38'; Krste Velkoski (yellow card) 45'; Leon Benko 51' (yellow card) 71'; Miloš Stojčev 77' | Report | | Stadium: Asim Ferhatović Hase Stadium; Attendance: 5,000; Referee: Dragan Petrović (Banja Luka) |

| 14 August 2015 4 | Sarajevo | 0–1 | Zrinjski | Sarajevo |
| 20:00 CEST (UTC+2) | Harmony Ikande (yellow card) 26'; Mario Barić (yellow card) 90+1' | Report | | Stadium: Asim Ferhatović Hase Stadium; Attendance: 7,500; Referee: Edin Jakupović (Bihać) |

| 22 August 2015 5 | Čelik | 1–1 | Sarajevo | Zenica |
| 17:00 CEST (UTC+2) | | Report | Harmony Ikande (yellow card) 25'; Milan Stepanov (yellow card) 42'; Leon Benko 51' (yellow card); Adnan Kovačević (yellow card) 65'; Tomislav Barbarić (yellow card) 76' | Stadium: Bilino Polje Stadium; Attendance: 4,500; Referee: Dragan Skakić (Gradiška) |

| 30 August 2015 6 | Sarajevo | 2–0 | Rudar | Sarajevo |
| 17:00 CEST (UTC+2) | Bojan Puzigaća 25'; Mehmed Alispahić (yellow card) 45'; Ševko Okić 48'; Adnan Kovačević (yellow card) 66'; Ševko Okić (yellow card) 90+1' | Report | | Stadium: Asim Ferhatović Hase Stadium; Attendance: 2,500; Referee: Goran Paradžik (Ljubuški) |

| 10 September 2015 7 | Slavija | 1–0 | Sarajevo | Istočno Sarajevo |
| 16:30 CEST (UTC+2) | | Report | Leon Benko (yellow card) 17'; Almir Bekić (yellow card) 90+1' | Stadium: Gradski SRC Slavija; Attendance: 1,500; Referee: Dragan Skakić (Gradiška) |

| 13 September 2015 8 | Sarajevo | 2–0 | Borac | Sarajevo |
| 16:30 CEST (UTC+2) | Tomislav Barbarić (yellow card) 30'; Amer Bekić 40' (yellow card) 51'; Krste Velkoski 74' | Report | | Stadium: Asim Ferhatović Hase Stadium; Attendance: 2,000; Referee: Elvis Mujić (Banovići) |

| 18 September 2015 9 | Radnik | 0–3 | Sarajevo | Bijeljina |
| 16:00 CEST (UTC+2) | | Report | Krste Velkoski 10'; Leon Benko 52'; Bojan Puzigaća (yellow card) 58'; Ševko Okić 66'; Edin Rustemović (yellow card) 69' | Stadium: Gradski stadion Attendance: 1,500; Referee: Zoran Grbić (Prijedor) |

| 27 September 2015 10 | Sarajevo | 4–0 | Vitez | Sarajevo |
| 15:30 CEST (UTC+2) | Tomislav Barbarić 1'; Anel Hebibović 40'; Adnan Kovačević 64'; Leon Benko 74' (yellow card) 88' | Report | | Stadium: Asim Ferhatović Hase Stadium; Attendance: 1,200; Referee: Ermin Sivac (Zenica) |

| 4 October 2015 11 | Željezničar | 1–0 | Sarajevo | Sarajevo |
| 15:30 CEST (UTC+2) | Tiago 25' | Report | Bojan Puzigaća (yellow card) 35'; Matej Delač (yellow card) 63'; Ivan Tatomirović (yellow card) 90+1' | Stadium: Stadion Grbavica; Attendance: 9,500; Referee: Ognjen Valjić (Banja Luka) |

| 18 October 2015 12 | Sarajevo | 4–1 | Velež | Sarajevo |
| 15:00 CEST (UTC+2) | Krste Velkoski 44'; Amer Bekić 58'; Leon Benko 69'; Ivan Tatomirović (yellow card) 74'; Krste Velkoski 84' | Report | | Stadium: Asim Ferhatović Hase Stadium; Attendance: 2,800; Referee: Goran Paradžik (Ljubuški) |

| 24 October 2015 13 | Mladost | 2–1 | Sarajevo | Doboj |
| 13:30 CEST (UTC+2) | | Report | Ševko Okić (yellow card) 26'; Tomislav Barbarić 44'; Advan Kadušić (yellow card) 71'; Samir Radovac (yellow card) 77' | Stadium: MGM Farm Arena; Attendance: 3,500; Referee: Vladimir Bjelica (Istočno Sarajevo) |

| 1 November 2015 14 | Sarajevo | 1–0 | Sloboda | Sarajevo |
| 13:00 CET (UTC+1) | Almir Bekić (yellow card) 19'; Edin Rustemović (yellow card) 33'; Haris Duljević (yellow card) 35'; Džemal Berberović (yellow card) 77'; Amer Bekić 80'; Ševko Okić (yellow card) 83' | Report | | Stadium: Asim Ferhatović Hase Stadium; Attendance: 5,500; Referee: Ognjen Valjić (Banja Luka) |

| 8 November 2015 15 | Olimpic | 1–3 | Sarajevo | Sarajevo |
| 13:00 CET (UTC+1) | | Report | Edin Rustemović (yellow card) 11'; Leon Benko 27'; Džemal Berberović (yellow card) 30'; Leon Benko 45+1'; Krste Velkoski 82'; Ahmad Kallasi (yellow card) 90+2' | Stadium: Asim Ferhatović Hase Stadium; Attendance: 2,500; Referee: Irfan Peljto (Sarajevo) |

| 21 November 2015 16 | Drina | 1–3 | Sarajevo | Zvornik |
| 13:00 CET (UTC+1) | | Report | Amer Bekić (yellow card) 21'; Edin Rustemović 22'; Ševko Okić 40'; Haris Duljević 42'; Ahmad Kallasi (yellow card) 90' | Stadium: Gradski stadion Attendance: 350; Referee: Husein Terzić (Travnik) |

| 29 November 2015 17 | Sarajevo | 4–0 | Travnik | Sarajevo |
| 13:00 CET (UTC+1) | Leon Benko 25'; Haris Duljević 26'; Almir Bekić (yellow card) 29'; Leon Benko (yellow card) 43'; Adnan Kovačević 52'; Adnan Osmanović 87' | Report | | Stadium: Asim Ferhatović Hase Stadium; Attendance: 1,500; Referee: Antoni Bandić (Grude) |

| 6 December 2015 18 | Široki Brijeg | 1–0 | Sarajevo | Široki Brijeg |
| 13:00 CET (UTC+1) | | Report | Ahmad Kallasi (yellow card) 22'; Tomislav Barbarić (yellow card) 55'; Džemal Berberović (yellow card) 87'; Haris Duljević (yellow card) 38' (yellow-red card) 90+5' | Stadium: Stadion Pecara; Attendance: 3,500; Referee: Dragan Skakić (Gradiška) |

| 28 February 2016 19 | Zrinjski | 2–2 | Sarajevo | Mostar |
| 15:00 CET (UTC+1) | | Report | Almir Bekić (yellow card) 5'; Deni Simeunović 23' (yellow card) 45'; Amer Bekić 68'; Advan Kadušić (yellow card) 89' | Stadium: Stadion pod Bijelim Brijegom; Attendance: 6,000; Referee: Edin Jakupović (Bihać) |

| 5 March 2016 20 | Sarajevo | 2–1 | Čelik | Sarajevo |
| 17:00 CET (UTC+1) | Leon Benko 68'; Tomislav Barbarić (yellow card) 55'; Advan Kadušić (yellow card) 67'; Haris Duljević (yellow card) 88'; Haris Harba 90+3' | Report | | Stadium: Asim Ferhatović Hase Stadium; Attendance: 6,000; Referee: Vladimir Bjelica (Istočno Sarajevo) |

| 12 March 2016 21 | Rudar | 1–1 | Sarajevo | Prijedor |
| 14:00 CET (UTC+1) | | Report | Deni Simeunović (yellow card) 17'; Denis Kramar (yellow card) 41'; Leon Benko 47'; Ahmad Kallasi (yellow card) 66' | Stadium: Gradski stadion Attendance: 500; Referee: Elvis Mujić (Banovići) |

| 20 March 2016 22 | Sarajevo | 3–0 | Slavija | Sarajevo |
| 17:00 CET (UTC+1) | Leon Benko 39'; Denis Kramar (yellow card) 44'; Amer Bekić 57'; Advan Kadušić (yellow card) 76'; Hamza Čataković 87' | Report | | Stadium: Asim Ferhatović Hase Stadium; Attendance: 2,500; Referee: Emir Spahalić (Mostar) |

| 2 April 2016 23 | Borac | 0–1 | Sarajevo | Banja Luka |
| 18:30 CEST (UTC+2) | | Report | Ševko Okić (yellow card) 42'; Tomislav Barbarić 44' (red card) 83'; Marko Mihojević (yellow card) 63'; Bojan Pavlović (yellow card) 85'; Ahmad Kallasi (yellow card) 90+1' | Stadium: Banja Luka City Stadium; Attendance: 4,500; Referee: Elvis Mujić (Banovići) |

| 10 April 2016 24 | Sarajevo | 2–1 | Radnik | Sarajevo |
| 16:00 CEST (UTC+2) | Amer Bekić 33' 66'; Haris Duljević (yellow card) 38'; Samir Radovac (yellow card) 49' | Report | | Stadium: Asim Ferhatović Hase Stadium; Attendance: 2,200; Referee: Zoran Grbić (Prijedor) |

| 17 April 2016 25 | Vitez | 1–3 | Sarajevo | Vitez |
| 16:30 CEST (UTC+2) | | Report | Leon Benko 46'; Amer Bekić 48' 90+4'; Džemal Berberović (yellow card) 90' | Stadium: Vitez City Stadium; Attendance: 2,300; Referee: Ognjen Valjić (Banja Luka) |

| 24 April 2016 26 | Sarajevo | 0–1 | Željezničar | Sarajevo |
| 17:00 CEST (UTC+2) | Edin Rustemović (yellow card) 24'; Almir Bekić (yellow card) 26'; Leon Benko (yellow card) 39'; Adnan Kovačević (yellow card) 45'; Amer Bekić (red card) 89' | Report | Miroslav Stevanović 45' | Stadium: Asim Ferhatović Hase Stadium; Attendance: 14,000; Referee: Edin Jakupović (Bihać) |

| 30 April 2016 27 | Velež | 0–3 | Sarajevo | Mostar |
| 17:00 CEST (UTC+2) | | Report | Haris Harba 5'; Tomislav Barbarić (yellow card) 19'; Ševko Okić 22'; Haris Duljević 40'; Marko Mihojević (yellow card) 42' | Stadium: Vrapčići Stadium; Attendance: 900; Referee: Ilija Živković (Orašje) |

| 4 May 2016 28 | Sarajevo | 2–1 | Mladost | Sarajevo |
| 17:00 CEST (UTC+2) | Edin Rustemović (yellow card) 27'; Advan Kadušić (yellow card) 30'; Leon Benko 45' 79'; Ševko Okić (yellow card) 86' | Report | | Stadium: Asim Ferhatović Hase Stadium; Attendance: 1,000; Referee: Goran Paradžik (Ljubuški) |

| 7 May 2016 29 | Sloboda | 4–0 | Sarajevo | Tuzla |
| 17:00 CEST (UTC+2) | | Report | Matej Delač (yellow card) 33'; Almir Bekić (yellow card) 55' | Stadium: Tušanj City Stadium; Attendance: 4,300; Referee: Dragan Skakić (Gradiška) |

| 15 May 2016 30 | Sarajevo | 1–3 | Olimpic | Sarajevo |
| 17:00 CEST (UTC+2) | Benko 51' | Report | | Stadium: Asim Ferhatović Hase Stadium; Attendance: 1,000; Referee: Husein Terzić (Travnik) |

=== Cup of Bosnia and Herzegovina ===
==== Round of 32 ====
| 23 September 2015 | Zrinjski Mostar | 1–1 (5–6 p) | Sarajevo | Mostar |
| 18:00 CEST (UTC+2) | | Report | Am. Bekić 62'; Rustemović (yellow card) 69'; Barbarić (yellow card) 76' | Stadium: Stadion pod Bijelim Brijegom; Attendance: 4,500; Referee: Elvis Mujić (Banovići) |
| | Penalties |
| | Zakarić (penalty scored); Peko (penalty scored); Radulović (penalty scored); Filipović (penalty scored); Mešanović (penalty scored); Blaić (penalty missed) | | (penalty scored) Puzigaća; (penalty scored) Barbarić; (penalty scored) Velkoski; (penalty scored) Rustemović; (penalty scored) Benko; (penalty scored) Duljević |

==== Round of 16 ====
| 21 October 2015 First leg | Slavija Sarajevo | 1–4 | Sarajevo | Istočno Sarajevo |
| 15:00 CEST (UTC+2) | | Report | Leon Benko 2'; Ševko Okić 14'; Leon Benko 54'; Advan Kadušić (yellow card) 76'; Krste Velkoski 89'; Bojan Puzigaća (yellow card) 90+2' | Stadium: Gradski SRC Slavija; Attendance: 600; Referee: Edin Jakupović (Bihać) |

| 4 November 2015 Second leg | Sarajevo | 3–1 (7–2 agg.) | Slavija Sarajevo | Sarajevo |
| 13:30 CET (UTC+1) | Adnan Osmanović 43'; Elvedin Herić 62'; Demirel Veladžić 88' | Report | | Stadium: Asim Ferhatović Hase Stadium; Attendance: 2,500; Referee: Emir Spahalić (Mostar) |

==== Quarter-finals ====
| 9 March 2016 First leg | Sloboda Tuzla | 2–1 | Sarajevo | Tuzla |
| 15:00 CET (UTC+1) | | Report | Almir Bekić (yellow card) 73'; Ševko Okić 85' | Stadium: Tušanj City Stadium; Attendance: 3,500; Referee: Zoran Grbić (Prijedor) |

| 15 March 2016 Second leg | Sarajevo | 0–3 (1–5 agg.) | Sloboda Tuzla | Sarajevo |
| 18:00 CET (UTC+1) | Advan Kadušić (yellow card) 41'; Haris Duljević (yellow card) 45' | Report | | Stadium: Asim Ferhatović Hase Stadium; Attendance: 9,000; Referee: Ognjen Valjić (Banja Luka) |

=== UEFA Champions League ===
==== Second qualifying round ====
| 14 July 2015 First leg | Sarajevo (Bosnia and Herzegovina) | 0–2 | (Poland) Lech Poznań | Sarajevo, Bosnia and Herzegovina |
| 21:00 CEST (UTC+2) | Barbarić (yellow card) 29'; Duljević (yellow card) 44'; Puzigaća (yellow card) 69' | Report | Hämäläinen 40'; Formella (yellow card) 58'; Thomalla 62'; Kędziora (yellow card) 64'; Jevtić (yellow card) 81' | Stadium: Asim Ferhatović Hase Stadium; Attendance: 16,500; Referee: Paolo Valeri (Italy) |

| 22 July 2015 Second leg | Lech Poznań (Poland) | 1–0 | (Bosnia and Herzegovina) Sarajevo | Poznań, Poland |
| 20:45 CEST (UTC+2) | Douglas 6'; Dudka (yellow card) 16' | Report | Alispahić (yellow card) 20'; Tatomirović (yellow card) 40'; Stepanov (yellow card) 59'; Barbarić (yellow card) 90+2' | Stadium: Poznań Stadium; Attendance: 22,205; Referee: Kevin Clancy (Scotland) |

== Statistics ==
=== Appearances and goals ===
| No. | Pos | Nat | Player | Total | | Premier League | | Cup of BiH | | Champions League | |
| No. | Pos | Nat | Player | Apps | Goals | Apps | Goals | Apps | Goals | Apps | Goals |
Goalkeepers
| 1 | GK | (Bosnia and Herzegovina) BIH | Emir Plakalo | 9 | 0 | 7 | 0 | 2 | 0 | 0 | 0 |
| 2 | GK | (Croatia) CRO | Matej Delač | 13 | 0 | 11+1 | 0 | 1 | 0 | 0 | 0 |
| 22 | GK | (Bosnia and Herzegovina) BIH | Ivan Trifković | 0 | 0 | 0 | 0 | 0 | 0 | 0 | 0 |
| 30 | GK | (Serbia) SRB | Bojan Pavlović | 12 | 0 | 10 | 0 | 2 | 0 | 0 | 0 |
Defenders
| 3 | DF | (Bosnia and Herzegovina) BIH | Advan Kadušić | 17 | 0 | 13 | 0 | 4 | 0 | 0 | 0 |
| 5 | DF | (Bosnia and Herzegovina) BIH | Nihad Mujakić | 0 | 0 | 0 | 0 | 0 | 0 | 0 | 0 |
| 6 | DF | (Bosnia and Herzegovina) BIH | Adnan Kovačević | 25 | 2 | 21 | 2 | 4 | 0 | 0 | 0 |
| 14 | DF | (Bosnia and Herzegovina) BIH | Edvin Rastoder | 0 | 0 | 0 | 0 | 0 | 0 | 0 | 0 |
| 15 | DF | (Slovenia) SVN | Denis Kramar | 5 | 0 | 4+1 | 0 | 0 | 0 | 0 | 0 |
| 16 | DF | (Bosnia and Herzegovina) BIH | Marko Mihojević | 17 | 0 | 9+6 | 0 | 1+1 | 0 | 0 | 0 |
| 19 | DF | (Bosnia and Herzegovina) BIH | Almir Bekić | 25 | 0 | 15+5 | 0 | 3 | 0 | 1+1 | 0 |
| 23 | DF | (Bosnia and Herzegovina) BIH | Džemal Berberović | 16 | 0 | 6+8 | 0 | 1+1 | 0 | 0 | 0 |
| 25 | DF | (Croatia) CRO | Tomislav Barbarić | 29 | 3 | 22+1 | 3 | 4 | 0 | 2 | 0 |
| 55 | DF | (Syria) SYR | Ahmad Kalasi | 14 | 0 | 8+5 | 0 | 1 | 0 | 0 | 0 |
Midfielders
| 4 | MF | (Bosnia and Herzegovina) BIH | Edin Rustemović | 29 | 1 | 21+3 | 1 | 4 | 0 | 0+1 | 0 |
| 7 | MF | (Bosnia and Herzegovina) BIH | Haris Duljević | 32 | 3 | 23+3 | 3 | 3+1 | 0 | 2 | 0 |
| 10 | MF | (Brazil) BRA | Emerson | 11 | 0 | 6+3 | 0 | 2 | 0 | 0 | 0 |
| 17 | MF | (Bosnia and Herzegovina) BIH | Elvedin Herić | 5 | 1 | 0+4 | 0 | 1 | 1 | 0 | 0 |
| 69 | MF | (Bosnia and Herzegovina) BIH | Demirel Veladžić | 2 | 1 | 0+1 | 0 | 0+1 | 1 | 0 | 0 |
| 79 | MF | (Bosnia and Herzegovina) BIH | Vedad Gljiva | 3 | 0 | 0+3 | 0 | 0 | 0 | 0 | 0 |
| 88 | MF | (Bosnia and Herzegovina) BIH | Samir Radovac | 28 | 0 | 20+4 | 0 | 1+1 | 0 | 2 | 0 |
| 92 | MF | (Croatia) CRO | Deni Simeunović | 4 | 1 | 3 | 1 | 1 | 0 | 0 | 0 |
| 77 | MF | (Bosnia and Herzegovina) BIH | Anes Vazda | 1 | 0 | 0 | 0 | 0+1 | 0 | 0 | 0 |
Forwards
| 8 | FW | (Bosnia and Herzegovina) BIH | Amer Bekić | 27 | 10 | 16+8 | 9 | 2+1 | 1 | 0 | 0 |
| 9 | FW | (Bosnia and Herzegovina) BIH | Ševko Okić | 31 | 7 | 20+6 | 5 | 3+2 | 2 | 0 | 0 |
| 13 | FW | (Brazil) BRA | Cezar Augusto | 5 | 0 | 3 | 0 | 0+2 | 0 | 0 | 0 |
| 21 | FW | (Croatia) CRO | Leon Benko | 32 | 20 | 22+4 | 18 | 4 | 2 | 2 | 0 |
| 28 | FW | (Bosnia and Herzegovina) BIH | Haris Harba | 12 | 2 | 4+6 | 2 | 1+1 | 0 | 0 | 0 |
| 69 | FW | (Bosnia and Herzegovina) BIH | Adnan Osmanović | 5 | 2 | 0+4 | 1 | 1 | 1 | 0 | 0 |
| 99 | FW | (Bosnia and Herzegovina) BIH | Hamza Čataković | 4 | 1 | 0+3 | 1 | 1 | 0 | 0 | 0 |
Players transferred out during the season
| 3 | DF | (Serbia) SRB | Radoš Protić | 0 | 0 | 0 | 0 | 0 | 0 | 0 | 0 |
| 5 | DF | (Bosnia and Herzegovina) BIH | Mario Barić | 8 | 0 | 5+2 | 0 | 1 | 0 | 0 | 0 |
| 7 | MF | (Serbia) SRB | Miloš Stojčev | 4 | 1 | 1+1 | 1 | 0 | 0 | 1+1 | 0 |
| 10 | MF | (Bosnia and Herzegovina) BIH | Mehmed Alispahić | 7 | 1 | 4+1 | 1 | 0 | 0 | 1+1 | 0 |
| 11 | FW | (North Macedonia) MKD | Krste Velkoski | 22 | 7 | 15+3 | 6 | 2 | 1 | 1+1 | 0 |
| 13 | MF | (Bosnia and Herzegovina) BIH | Anel Hebibović | 12 | 1 | 7 | 1 | 1+2 | 0 | 1+1 | 0 |
| 14 | DF | (Serbia) SRB | Ivan Tatomirović | 14 | 0 | 11 | 0 | 2 | 0 | 1 | 0 |
| 15 | DF | (Serbia) SRB | Milan Stepanov | 7 | 0 | 5 | 0 | 0 | 0 | 2 | 0 |
| 32 | GK | (Bosnia and Herzegovina) BIH | Senedin Oštraković | 4 | 0 | 2 | 0 | 0 | 0 | 2 | 0 |
| 59 | MF | (Bosnia and Herzegovina) BIH | Gojko Cimirot | 4 | 0 | 2 | 0 | 0 | 0 | 2 | 0 |
| 70 | MF | (Nigeria) NGA | Harmony Ikande | 7 | 0 | 4+2 | 0 | 1 | 0 | 0 | 0 |
| 77 | DF | (Bosnia and Herzegovina) BIH | Bojan Puzigaća | 14 | 1 | 10 | 1 | 1+1 | 0 | 2 | 0 |

Number after the "+" sign represents the number of games player started the game on the bench and was substituted on.

=== Goalscorers ===
| Rank | No. | Pos. | Nat. | Player | Premier League | Cup of BiH | Champions League | Total |
|---|---|---|---|---|---|---|---|---|
| 1 | 21 | FW | (Croatia) | Leon Benko | 18 | 2 | 0 | 20 |
| 2 | 8 | FW | (Bosnia and Herzegovina) | Amer Bekić | 9 | 1 | 0 | 10 |
| 3 | 9 | FW | (Bosnia and Herzegovina) | Ševko Okić | 5 | 2 | 0 | 7 |
| 3 | 11 | FW | (North Macedonia) | Krste Velkoski | 6 | 1 | 0 | 7 |
| 5 | 7 | MF | (Bosnia and Herzegovina) | Haris Duljević | 3 | 0 | 0 | 3 |
| 5 | 25 | DF | (Croatia) | Tomislav Barbarić | 3 | 0 | 0 | 3 |
| 7 | 6 | DF | (Bosnia and Herzegovina) | Adnan Kovačević | 2 | 0 | 0 | 2 |
| 7 | 28 | FW | (Bosnia and Herzegovina) | Haris Harba | 2 | 0 | 0 | 2 |
| 7 | 69 | FW | (Bosnia and Herzegovina) | Adnan Osmanović | 1 | 1 | 0 | 2 |
| 10 | 4 | MF | (Bosnia and Herzegovina) | Edin Rustemović | 1 | 0 | 0 | 1 |
| 10 | 7 | MF | (Serbia) | Miloš Stojčev | 1 | 0 | 0 | 1 |
| 10 | 10 | MF | (Bosnia and Herzegovina) | Mehmed Alispahić | 1 | 0 | 0 | 1 |
| 10 | 13 | MF | (Bosnia and Herzegovina) | Anel Hebibović | 1 | 0 | 0 | 1 |
| 10 | 17 | MF | (Bosnia and Herzegovina) | Elvedin Herić | 0 | 1 | 0 | 1 |
| 10 | 69 | MF | (Bosnia and Herzegovina) | Demirel Veladžić | 0 | 1 | 0 | 1 |
| 10 | 77 | DF | (Bosnia and Herzegovina) | Bojan Puzigaća | 1 | 0 | 0 | 1 |
| 10 | 92 | MF | (Croatia) | Deni Simeunović | 1 | 0 | 0 | 1 |
| 10 | 99 | FW | (Bosnia and Herzegovina) | Hamza Čataković | 1 | 0 | 0 | 1 |
| Total | | | | | 56 | 9 | 0 | 65 |
