= Vedran Kjosevski =

Bosnian footballer (born 1995)

Personal information
- Date of birth: 22 May 1995 (age 31)
- Place of birth: Veles, Macedonia
- Height: 1.85 m (6 ft 1 in)
- Position: Goalkeeper

Team information
- Current team: Radnik Bijeljina
- Number: 27

Youth career
- 2005–2013: Željezničar

Senior career*
Years	Team	Apps	(Gls)
2013–2020	Željezničar	100	(1)
2020–2021	Velež Mostar	4	(0)
2022–2024	Struga	54	(0)
2024	Esteghlal	0	(0)
2024–2025	Struga	22	(0)
2025–2026	Vardar	3	(0)
2026–	Radnik Bijeljina	3	(0)

International career
2010–2011	Bosnia and Herzegovina U17	7	(0)
2013	Bosnia and Herzegovina U19	4	(0)
2015	Bosnia and Herzegovina U21	1	(0)
- * Club domestic league appearances and goals as of 19 September 2026

Vedran Kjosevski (Bosnian pronunciation: [ʋědran kjǒseʋski], Macedonian: Ведран Ќосевски; born 22 May 1995) is a Bosnian professional footballer who plays as a goalkeeper for Bosnian Premier League club Radnik Bijeljina.

== Club career ==
=== Željezničar ===
Kjosevski joined Željezničar's youth academy in 2005 and came through all youth categories. He signed his first professional contract with the club on 28 May 2013. On 29 March 2014, he made his professional debut against Leotar at the age of 18.

In the following seasons, Kjosevski struggled to become first-choice goalkeeper, eventually securing that spot in 2016. On 14 August 2017, he signed a new three-year contract.

On 7 April 2018, he managed to score a goal against Široki Brijeg, which earned his team a point in the game. Later that season, Kjosevski won his first trophy with the club by beating Krupa in the Bosnian Cup final.

In July 2018, Kjosevski was named club captain. A few months later, he was stripped of captaincy and suspended due to breach of club's discipline. Shortly after, the suspension was lifted, but Kjosevski did not get his captaincy arm band back as teammate Sulejman Krpić was named new captain.

In April 2019, after poor showing in Željezničar's games, Kjosevski lost his first choice goalkeeper spot, eventually becoming the second choice goalkeeper after former teammate Irfan Fejzić became the new first choice goalkeeper in the team, and in the 2019–20 season, became the third choice goalkeeper after the signing of Serbian goalkeeper Filip Erić who became first choice and after 19 year old Jasmin Kršić became second choice.

After over 6 months of not playing any league matches for Željezničar, Kjosevski made his first league appearance in the 2019–20 season for the club on 30 November 2019, in Željezničar's 1–3 away win against fierce city rivals FK Sarajevo in the Sarajevo derby.

On 27 June 2020, it was announced that Kjosevski, alongside teammate Kemal Osmanković, had left the club after their contracts with Željezničar expired.

=== Velež Mostar ===
Nearly three months after leaving Željezničar, Kjosevski decided to stay in Bosnian football, signing a two-year contract with Velež Mostar on 25 September 2020. He made his official debut for Velež in a league game against Radnik Bijeljina, on 27 February 2021. Kjosevski left the club in June 2021.

== International career ==
Kjosevski represented Bosnia and Herzegovina on various youth levels.

In March 2018, after Jasmin Burić got injured, he received his first senior call-up, for friendly games against Bulgaria and Senegal.

Kjosevski is still eligible to represent North Macedonia as his birth country.

== Career statistics ==
As of match played 27 October 2026

Appearances and goals by club, season and competition
Club	Season	League			National cup (Note: Includes Bosnian Cup, Macedonian Cup)		Continental		Total	
Club	Season	Division	Apps	Goals	Apps	Goals	Apps	Goals	Apps	Goals
Željezničar	2013–14	Bosnian Premier League	1	0	0	0	—		1	0
Željezničar	2014–15	Bosnian Premier League	1	0	3	0	—		4	0
Željezničar	2015–16	Bosnian Premier League	11	0	7	0	—		18	0
Željezničar	2016–17	Bosnian Premier League	29	0	4	0	—		33	0
Željezničar	2017–18	Bosnian Premier League	30	1	7	0	4 (Note: Appearances in UEFA Europa League)	0	41	1
Željezničar	2018–19	Bosnian Premier League	23	0	0	0	4	0	27	0
Željezničar	2019–20	Bosnian Premier League	5	0	2	0	—		7	0
Željezničar	Total		100	1	23	0	8	0	131	1
Velež Mostar	2020–21	Bosnian Premier League	4	0	—		—		4	0
Struga	2022–23	Macedonian First League	24	0	—		—		24	0
Struga	2023–24	Macedonian First League	30	0	—		8 (Note: Two appearances in UEFA Champions League, six appearances in UEFA Conference League)	0	38	0
Struga	2024–25	Macedonian First League	22	0	4	0	—		26	0
Struga	Total		76	0	4	0	8	0	88	0
Vardar	2025–26	Macedonian First League	3	0	—		—		3	0
Radnik Bijeljina	2026–27	Bosnian Premier League	3	0	1	0	—		4	0
Career total			186	1	28	0	16	0	230	1

== Honours ==
Željezničar

- Bosnian Cup: 2017–18
