= Harmony Ikande =

Nigerian footballer (born 1990)

Personal information
- Full name: Harmony Ikande
- Date of birth: 17 September 1990 (age 36)
- Place of birth: Kano, Nigeria
- Height: 1.81 m (5 ft 11 1/2 in)
- Position: Midfielder

Youth career
- 2009–2010: Milan

Senior career*
Years	Team	Apps	(Gls)
2010–2011	Milan	0	(0)
2010	→ Monza (loan)	5	(0)
2010–2011	→ Poggibonsi (loan)	9	(1)
2011	→ Extremadura (loan)	8	(2)
2011	Budapest Honvéd	2	(0)
2011	→ Budapest Honvéd II	5	(1)
2012	Beitar Jerusalem	2	(0)
2013	Hapoel Ashkelon	16	(1)
2013–2014	Hoverla Uzhhorod	10	(1)
2014–2015	Hapoel Tel Aviv	12	(1)
2015	Sarajevo	6	(0)
2016	Maccabi Yavne	3	(0)
2016–2017	Aris Limassol	0	(0)
2017–2018	Hapel Nazareth Illit	10	(0)
2018	Hapoel Ramat Gan	0	(0)
2018–2019	Al-Jabalain		
2019–2020	Saham		
2020–2021	Al-Shoulla		
2021	Al-Washm		
2022-2023	Police Machine	13	(5)
2023	Lobi Stars F.C.	15	(3)
Total		104	(15)

International career
2009	Nigeria U20	2	(0)
2011	Nigeria U23	1	(0)
- * Club domestic league appearances and goals as of 19 January 2018

Harmony Ikande (born 17 September 1990) is a Nigerian professional footballer who plays as a midfielder.

== Club career ==
Ikande was signed by Serie A club Milan in 2009. He played in their youth system until January 2010, when he was sent out on loan to Prima Divisione side Monza for six months. At the beginning of the 2010–11 season he was loaned out to Poggibonsi. However, he was called back in January 2011 and he was signed on another loan deal by Spanish side Extremadura.

== International career ==
At international level, he represented Nigeria at the 2009 FIFA U-20 World Cup, playing 2 games. Ikande was then called in May 2011 to be part of the Dream Team V, the Nigerian U-23 team, and played their friendly game against Costa Rica national football team.

== Career statistics ==
As of 6 December 2015

Club performance			League		Cup		Continental		Total	
Season	Club	League	Apps	Goals	Apps	Goals	Apps	Goals	Apps	Goals
Bosnia and Herzegovina			League		Cup		Europe		Total	
2015–16	FK Sarajevo	Premijer liga BiH	6	0	1	0	0	0	7	0
FK Sarajevo Total			6	0	1	0	0	0	7	0
