= Mladen Veselinović (Bosnian footballer) =

Bosnian footballer (born 1993)

Personal information
- Date of birth: 4 January 1993 (age 33)
- Place of birth: Zenica, Bosnia and Herzegovina
- Height: 1.74 m (5 ft 9 in)
- Position: Midfielder

Team information
- Current team: Sloga Doboj
- Number: 10

Senior career*
Years	Team	Apps	(Gls)
2012–2013	Sloga Doboj		
2013–2015	Viktoria Plzeň	0	(0)
2014–2015	→ Baník Most (loan)	20	(3)
2015–2017	Sloboda Tuzla	49	(4)
2017–2018	Borac Banja Luka	25	(1)
2018–2021	Željezničar	66	(5)
2021–2022	Sloboda Tuzla	31	(1)
2022–2023	Tuzla City	13	(1)
2023	Kyzylzhar	22	(0)
2024–	Sloga Doboj	42	(0)
- * Club domestic league appearances and goals as of 20 September 2026

Mladen Veselinović (Serbian Cyrillic: Младен Веселиновић; born 4 January 1993) is a Bosnian professional footballer who plays as a midfielder for Bosnian Premier League club Sloga Doboj. Previously he also played for Sloboda Tuzla, Borac Banja Luka and Željezničar.

== Career statistics ==
As of match played 20 September 2026

Appearances and goals by club, season and competition
Club	Season	League			National cup (Note: Includes Czech Cup, Bosnian Cup, Kazakhstan Cup)		Continental		Total	
Club	Season	Division	Apps	Goals	Apps	Goals	Apps	Goals	Apps	Goals
Viktoria Plzeň	2013–14	Czech First League	0	0	2	0	—		2	0
Baník Most (loan)	2014–15	Czech National League	20	3	—		—		20	3
Sloboda Tuzla	2015–16	Bosnian Premier League	28	2	8	2	—		36	4
Sloboda Tuzla	2016–17	Bosnian Premier League	21	2	2	0	2 (Note: Appearances in UEFA Europa League)	0	25	2
Sloboda Tuzla	Total		49	4	10	2	2	0	61	6
Borac Banja Luka	2017–18	Bosnian Premier League	25	1	1	0	—		26	1
Željezničar	2018–19	Bosnian Premier League	25	2	—		4	0	29	2
Željezničar	2019–20	Bosnian Premier League	18	1	2	1	—		20	2
Željezničar	2020–21	Bosnian Premier League	23	2	2	0	1	0	26	2
Željezničar	Total		66	5	4	1	5	0	75	6
Sloboda Tuzla	2021–22	Bosnian Premier League	31	1	3	0	—		34	1
Tuzla City	2022–23	Bosnian Premier League	13	1	1	0	1 (Note: Appearances in UEFA Conference League)	0	15	1
Kyzylzhar	2023	Kazakhstan Premier League	22	0	4	2	—		26	2
Sloga Doboj	2023–24	Bosnian Premier League	8	0	2	0	—		10	0
Sloga Doboj	2024–25	Bosnian Premier League	29	0	2	1	—		31	1
Sloga Doboj	2026–27	Bosnian Premier League	5	0	0	0	—		5	0
Sloga Doboj	Total		42	0	4	1	—		46	1
Career total			268	15	29	6	8	0	305	21

== Honours ==
Viktoria Plzeň

- Czech First League runner up: 2013–14
- Czech Cup runner up: 2013–14
- Czech Supercup runner up: 2013

Sloboda Tuzla

- Bosnian Premier League runner up: 2015–16
- Bosnian Cup runner up: 2015–16
