= Mehmed Alispahić =

Bosnian professional footballer (born 1987)

Personal information
- Full name: Mehmed Alispahić
- Date of birth: 24 November 1987 (age 38)
- Place of birth: Bugojno, SR Bosnia and Herzegovina, SFR Yugoslavia
- Height: 1.82 m (6 ft 0 in)
- Position: Attacking midfielder

Team information
- Current team: GNK Šibenik (head coach)

Youth career
- 2000–2005: Iskra Bugojno

Senior career*
Years	Team	Apps	(Gls)
2005–2008	Iskra Bugojno		
2008–2011	Šibenik	84	(22)
2011–2013	Dinamo Zagreb	30	(5)
2013–2015	Rijeka	35	(3)
2015–2016	Sarajevo	13	(1)
2016–2017	Šibenik	19	(1)
2017	Al-Ahli Manama		
2017–2018	Šibenik	22	(2)
2018–2019	Sloboda Tuzla	22	(1)
2019–2021	Željezničar	48	(4)
2021–2023	NK Vodice		
2023–	Junak Sinj		

International career
2010–2012	Bosnia and Herzegovina	4	(0)

Managerial career
- 2023–2024: NK Vodice
- 2025–2026: HNK Šibenik (assistant)
- 2026: HNK Šibenik
- 2026–: GNK Šibenik
- * Club domestic league appearances and goals as of 30 May 2021

Mehmed Alispahić (born 24 November 1987) is a Bosnian professional football manager and former player who played as an attacking midfielder. He is the current head coach of Croatian First County League club GNK Šibenik.

== Club career ==
Alispahić began his career with Iskra Bugojno in the First League of FBiH. He then joined Croatian 1. HNL club Šibenik in 2008. In May 2011, Alispahić agreed to a transfer to Dinamo Zagreb, where he stayed for a year and a half, before moving on a free transfer to Rijeka in late December 2012.

After a short spell at Sarajevo, he returned to Šibenik. On 1 June 2016, he and Jamilu Collins missed their penalties in a penalty shoot-out against Istra 1961 and Istra gained promotion, while Šibenik remained in the second tier.

After leaving Šibenik in the summer of 2018, he signed with Bosnian Premier League club Sloboda Tuzla in June of that same year. After only one season of playing for the club, Alispahić left Sloboda in June 2019.

On 20 June 2019, he signed a two-year contract with Željezničar. Alispahić made his official debut for Željezničar on 20 July 2019, in a 0–0 home league draw against Borac Banja Luka. He scored his first goal for Željezničar in a thrilling 5–2 home league match, Sarajevo derby win against his former club Sarajevo on 31 August 2019. Alispahić left Željezničar on 2 July 2021.

== International career ==
After an impressive finish to the 2009–10 season with Šibenik, including some spectacular goals, he received his first call-up to the Bosnia and Herzegovina national team in May 2010 for the friendly matches against Sweden and Germany.

He made his debut against Sweden, coming on as a substitute in the second half, and has earned a total of 4 caps, scoring no goals. His final international was a May 2012 match against Mexico.

== Personal life ==
Alispahić's younger brother Sabit was also a professional footballer.

== Career statistics ==
=== Club ===
As of match played 30 May 2021.

Appearances and goals by club, season and competition
Club performance			League		Cup		Continental		Total	
Club	Season	League	Apps	Goals	Apps	Goals	Apps	Goals	Apps	Goals
Šibenik	2008–09	1. HNL	31	4	1	0	—		32	4
Šibenik	2009–10	1. HNL	28	7	6	0	—		34	7
Šibenik	2010–11	1. HNL	25	11	2	0	3	0	30	11
Šibenik	Total		84	22	9	0	3	0	96	22
Dinamo Zagreb	2011–12	1. HNL	17	4	5	1	6	0	28	5
Dinamo Zagreb	2012–13	1. HNL	13	1	2	0	4	0	19	1
Dinamo Zagreb	Total		30	5	7	1	10	0	47	6
Rijeka	2012–13	1. HNL	14	0	—		—		14	0
Rijeka	2013–14	1. HNL	21	3	3	3	8	0	32	6
Rijeka	Total		35	3	3	3	8	0	46	6
Sarajevo	2014–15	Bosnian Premier League	8	0	2	0	—		10	0
Sarajevo	2015–16	Bosnian Premier League	5	1	—		2	0	7	1
Sarajevo	Total		13	1	2	0	2	0	17	1
Šibenik	2015–16	2. HNL	13	0	2	0	—		15	0
Šibenik	2016–17	2. HNL	6	1	0	0	—		6	1
Šibenik	2017–18	2. HNL	22	2	2	0	—		24	2
Šibenik	Total		41	3	4	0	—		45	3
Sloboda Tuzla	2018–19	Bosnian Premier League	22	1	0	0	—		22	1
Željezničar	2019–20	Bosnian Premier League	19	2	1	0	—		20	2
Željezničar	2020–21	Bosnian Premier League	29	2	1	0	1	0	31	2
Željezničar	Total		48	4	2	0	1	0	51	4
Career Total			273	39	27	4	24	0	324	43

=== International ===
International caps and goals

International appearances and goals
Year	#	Date	Venue	Opponent	Result	Competition	Goal(s)
2010	1	29 May	Råsunda Stadium, Solna	Sweden	2–4	Friendly	0
2010	2	10 August	Asim Ferhatović Hase Stadium, Sarajevo	Qatar	1–1	Friendly	0
2012	3	29 May	Aviva Stadium, Dublin	Republic of Ireland	0–1	Friendly	0
2012	4	1 June	Soldier Field, Chicago	Mexico	1–2	Friendly	0

== Honours ==
Dinamo Zagreb

- 1. HNL: 2011–12
- Croatian Cup: 2011–12

Rijeka

- Croatian Cup: 2013–14

Sarajevo

- Bosnian Premier League: 2014–15
