= Petar Bojo =

Bosnian footballer (born 1998)

Personal information
- Date of birth: 8 January 1998 (age 28)
- Place of birth: Kiseljak, Bosnia and Herzegovina
- Height: 1.75 m (5 ft 9 in)
- Position: Defensive midfielder

Team information
- Current team: Leotar
- Number: 19

Youth career
- 2012–2017: Široki Brijeg
- 2017: Vysočina Jihlava

Senior career*
Years	Team	Apps	(Gls)
2017–2018	Vitez	25	(5)
2018–2019	Mladost Doboj Kakanj	31	(3)
2019–2022	Željezničar	55	(7)
2022–2023	Zrinjski Mostar	4	(0)
2022–2023	→ Igman Konjic (loan)	10	(1)
2023	Igman Konjic	18	(2)
2024	Voska Sport	12	(0)
2024–2025	Sloboda Tuzla	15	(5)
2025–	Leotar	16	(2)

International career
2014–2015	Bosnia and Herzegovina U17	4	(0)
2015–2016	Bosnia and Herzegovina U18	1	(0)
2016–2018	Bosnia and Herzegovina U19	4	(0)
2018–2019	Bosnia and Herzegovina U21	6	(0)
- * Club domestic league appearances and goals as of 14 March 2026

Petar Bojo (born 8 January 1998) is a Bosnian professional footballer who plays as a defensive midfielder for First League of RS club Leotar.

== Club career ==
=== Early career ===
Bojo started off his youth career at the youth team of Široki Brijeg, before joining the Vysočina Jihlava youth team in 2017.

After half a year of playing at Vysočina Jihlava, Bojo went to Bosnian Premier League club Vitez and thus signed a contract with his first ever senior team.

=== Mladost Doboj Kakanj ===
After Vitez got relegated to the First League of FBiH in the 2017–18 Bosnian Premier League season, Bojo left Vitez and shortly after, on 27 June 2018, signed a two-year contract with Mladost Doboj Kakanj.

He made his debut for Mladost on 21 July 2018, in a 0–0 home draw against newly promoted Zvijezda 09. He scored his first goal two games after the Zvijezda 09 game, on 11 August 2018, in a 2–2 away draw against Krupa.

In the 2018–19 Bosnian Premier League season, Bojo was recognized as not only one of the best Mladost Doboj Kakanj players, but was also recognized as one of the best young players in the whole league as well.

=== Željezničar ===
On 27 June 2019, Bojo signed a two-year contract with Željezničar for a €30.000 transfer fee.

He made his official debut for Željezničar on 20 July 2019, in a 0–0 home league draw against Borac Banja Luka. In that same game, he also got a red card in the 80th minute after making a foul on Borac player Demir Jakupović and then getting a second yellow card.

He scored his first goal for Željezničar on 31 August 2019, in a thrilling 5–2 home league match, Sarajevo derby win against fierce rivals Sarajevo.

In July 2020, Bojo ruptured his medial collateral ligament of his right leg in a training session and it was reported that the injury would sideline him for two months.

In his first match since recovering from the injury, he scored a goal in Željezničar's 2020–21 Bosnian Cup second round win against Goražde on 21 October 2020.

On 18 January 2022, it was announced that Bojo terminated his contract with Željezničar and left the club on mutual agreement.

=== Zrinjski Mostar ===
One day following him leaving Željezničar, on 19 January 2022, Bojo signed a two-and-a-half-year contract with Zrinjski Mostar.

== International career ==
Bojo represented Bosnia and Herzegovina on various youth levels. He played for the U17, U18 and U19 national team levels, before getting called up to the U21 national team in November 2018.

Bojo made his U21 international debut for Bosnia and Herzegovina on 19 November 2018, in a 2–0 home win against Azerbaijan.

== Career statistics ==
=== Club ===
As of match played 18 May 2024

Appearances and goals by club, season and competition
Club	Season	League			National cup (Note: Includes Bosnia and Herzegovina Cup)		Total	
Club	Season	Division	Apps	Goals	Apps	Goals	Apps	Goals
Vitez	2017–18	Bosnian Premier League	25	5	2	1	27	6
Mladost Doboj Kakanj	2018–19	Bosnian Premier League	31	3	1	0	32	3
Željezničar	2019–20	Bosnian Premier League	19	2	2	0	21	2
Željezničar	2020–21	Bosnian Premier League	20	2	2	1	22	3
Željezničar	2021–22	Bosnian Premier League	16	3	2	3	18	6
Željezničar	Total		55	7	6	4	61	11
Zrinjski Mostar	2021–22	Bosnian Premier League	4	0	—		4	0
Igman Konjic (loan)	2022–23	Bosnian Premier League	10	1	0	0	10	1
Igman Konjic	2023–24	Bosnian Premier League	18	2	0	0	18	2
Igman Konjic	Total		28	3	0	0	28	3
Voska Sport	2023–24	Macedonian First League	12	0	—		12	0
Career total			155	18	9	5	164	23

== Honours ==
Zrinjski Mostar

- Bosnian Premier League: 2021–22
