= Admir Džubur =

Bosnian businessman (1964–2020)

President of FK Željezničar
- In office 29 June 2019 – 23 November 2020
- Preceded by: Nihad Selimović; Jasmin Badžak (interim)
- Succeeded by: Samir Cerić

Personal details
- Born: 13 June 1964 Sarajevo, SR Bosnia and Herzegovina, SFR Yugoslavia
- Died: 23 November 2020 (aged 56) Sarajevo, Bosnia and Herzegovina
- Occupation: Businessman, football administrator

Admir Džubur (13 June 1964 – 23 November 2020) was a Bosnian businessman and football administrator who was the president of FK Željezničar from 2019 to 2020.

Džubur was also the director of KJKP "Toplane – Sarajevo". He was the president of Željezničar from June 2019 until his death in November 2020, from complications caused by COVID-19, amid its pandemic in Bosnia and Herzegovina.
