= Šerif Hasić =

Bosnian footballer (born 1988)

Personal information
- Full name: Šerif Hasić
- Date of birth: 7 January 1988 (age 38)
- Place of birth: Zenica, SR Bosnia and Herzegovina, Yugoslavia
- Height: 1.90 m (6 ft 3 in)
- Position: Centre-back

Youth career
- –2005: Čelik Zenica

Senior career*
Years	Team	Apps	(Gls)
2005–2008	Čelik Zenica	39	(3)
2009	Junak Sinj	5	(0)
2009	Sloboda Tuzla	15	(1)
2010	Kriens	2	(0)
2010	Novi Pazar	7	(0)
2011–2012	Zvijezda Gradačac	25	(2)
2012	Krajišnik Velika Kladuša	0	(0)
2013	Sloboda Tuzla	28	(2)
2013–2014	Podgrmeč	8	(0)
2015–2016	Mladost Doboj Kakanj	26	(1)
2016–2017	Rudar Kakanj	11	(2)
2017–2018	Bratstvo Gračanica	39	(4)
2018–2019	TOŠK Tešanj	26	(6)
2019–2020	Mladost Doboj Kakanj	15	(0)
2020	PSM Makassar	3	(0)
2021	Vis Simm-Bau	0	(0)
2021–2022	PSM Makassar	14	(2)
Total		263	(23)

International career
2007	Bosnia and Herzegovina U21	3	(0)
- * Club domestic league appearances and goals

Šerif Hasić (born 7 January 1988) is a Bosnian former professional footballer who plays as a centre-back.

== Honours ==
Mladost Doboj Kakanj

- First League of FBiH: 2014–15
