= Haris Harba =

Bosnian-Herzegovinian footballer (born 1988)

Personal information
- Full name: Haris Harba
- Date of birth: 14 July 1988 (age 38)
- Place of birth: Foča, SFR Yugoslavia
- Height: 1.87 m (6 ft 2 in)
- Position: Forward

Team information
- Current team: FC Petržalka
- Number: 10

Senior career*
Years	Team	Apps	(Gls)
- Bosna Sarajevo
2011–2012	Olimpik Sarajevo	34	(11)
2012–2013	Hradec Králové	26	(2)
2013–2016	Vysočina Jihlava	58	(16)
2015	→ Spartak Trnava (loan)	14	(2)
2015	→ Sarajevo (loan)	10	(2)
2016	→ Fastav Zlín (loan)	12	(6)
2017	Bucheon FC	2	(0)
2017–2018	BB Erzurumspor	12	(1)
2018	ViOn Zlaté Moravce	13	(2)
2018	Kukësi	4	(0)
2019	Slovácko	4	(0)
2019	Vyškov	9	(4)
2020	Blansko	11	(1)
2021	Bylis	11	(0)
2021−	Petržalka	65	(24)

International career
2011	Bosnia and Hezregovina Olympic	1	(0)
- * Club domestic league appearances and goals as of 20 May 2024

Haris Harba (born 14 July 1988) is a Bosnian footballer who plays for FC Petržalka as a forward.

== Club career ==
=== FK Kukësi ===
After joining FK Kukësi in the summer 2018, Harba left the club again already at the end of the year.

=== FK Blansko ===
On 29 January 2020, it was confirmed that Harba had joined FK Blansko.

== International career ==
Harba made his international debut for Bosnia and Herzegovina on 16 December 2011, in a 1–0 loss against Poland in a friendly match. It was an unofficial game though, between a Polish team of local league players and a Bosnian Olympic team.

== Career statistics ==
As of 15 May 2016

Club performance			League		Cup		Continental		Total	
Season	Club	League	Apps	Goals	Apps	Goals	Apps	Goals	Apps	Goals
Bosnia and Herzegovina			League		Cup		Europe		Total	
2015–16	FK Sarajevo	Premijer liga BiH	10	2	2	0	0	0	12	2
FK Sarajevo Total			10	2	2	0	0	0	12	2
