= Demirel Veladžić =

Bosnian footballer

Personal information
- Date of birth: 15 May 1999 (age 27)
- Place of birth: Velika Kladuša, Bosnia and Herzegovina
- Height: 1.77 m (5 ft 10 in)
- Position: Midfielder

Youth career
- –2017: Sarajevo
- 2018–2019: Leixões

Senior career*
Years	Team	Apps	(Gls)
2015–2017	Sarajevo	1	(0)
2020–2021	Mladost Doboj Kakanj	5	(0)

International career
2015–2016	Bosnia and Herzegovina U17	7	(2)
2018	Bosnia and Herzegovina U19	1	(0)
- * Club domestic league appearances and goals as of 6 December 2020

Demirel Veladžić (born 15 May 1999) is a Bosnian former professional footballer who played as a midfielder.

== Career ==
Before the second half of the 2017–18 season, Veladžić joined the youth academy of Portuguese second division side Leixões from Sarajevo, one of Bosnia and Herzegovina's most successful club.

On 15 June 2020, he joined Bosnian Premier League club Mladost Doboj Kakanj.
