= Dženan Zajmović =

Belgian footballer

Personal information
- Date of birth: 11 November 1994 (age 31)
- Place of birth: Antwerp, Belgium
- Height: 1.90 m (6 ft 3 in)
- Position: Forward

Team information
- Current team: Sogdiana
- Number: 9

Youth career
- 2004–2013: Željezničar

Senior career*
| Years | Team | Apps | (Gls) |
| 2013–2014 | Lokomotiva Zagreb | 11 | (2) |
| 2014 | → Sesvete (loan) | 10 | (0) |
| 2014–2017 | Travnik | 59 | (13) |
| 2017–2020 | Željezničar | 54 | (7) |
| 2020–2021 | Politehnica Iași | 19 | (3) |
| 2021–2022 | Velež Mostar | 41 | (14) |
| 2023 | Sogdiana Jizzakh | 15 | (8) |
| 2024 | Radnik Surdulica | 11 | (6) |
| 2024–2025 | TS Galaxy | 20 | (8) |
| 2025 | Zob Ahan | 6 | (0) |
| 2026 | Cape Town City | 4 | (0) |
| 2026– | Sogdiana | 3 | (1) |
- * Club domestic league appearances and goals as of 29 July 2026

Dženan Zajmović (born 11 November 1994) is a Belgian / Bosnian professional footballer who plays as a forward for the Uzbek Super League club Sogdiana.

== Career ==
After spells in Croatia and with Bosnian powerhouse Željezničar, Zajmović moved abroad again in September 2020, when he signed with Romanian top-tier side Poli Iași. On 2 June 2021, Bosnian Premier League club Velež Mostar announced Zajmović's arrival to the club. He left Velež in January 2023.

== Honours ==
Željezničar

- Bosnian Cup: 2017–18

Velež Mostar

- Bosnian Cup: 2021–22
