= Denis Kramar =

Slovenian footballer (born 1991)

Personal information
- Full name: Denis Kramar
- Date of birth: 7 November 1991 (age 34)
- Place of birth: Murska Sobota, Slovenia
- Height: 1.85 m (6 ft 1 in)
- Position: Centre back

Team information
- Current team: SV Heiligenkreuz
- Number: 4

Youth career
- –2009: Celje
- 2009–2010: Rudar Velenje

Senior career*
Years	Team	Apps	(Gls)
2009–2011	Rudar Velenje	2	(0)
2010–2011	→ Šmartno 1928 (loan)	20	(3)
2011–2013	Mura 05	27	(1)
2012	→ Ljutomer (loan)	1	(0)
2013	Widzew Łódź	3	(0)
2013–2014	EN Paralimni	0	(0)
2014–2015	Getafe B	13	(0)
2015	→ Perth Glory (loan)	6	(1)
2016	Sarajevo	5	(0)
2016–2017	Víkingur Ólafsvík	8	(0)
2017–2018	FC Bad Radkersburg	26	(3)
2018–2019	SC Weiz	26	(3)
2019	Lafnitz Ama	7	(0)
2020	Beltinci	0	(0)
2020–2022	SC Weiz	38	(2)
2023–2024	SV Feldbach 1919	5	(2)
2024	Drava Ptuj		
2024–	SV Heiligenkreuz	11	(0)

International career
2007	Slovenia U16	4	(0)
- * Club domestic league appearances and goals as of 7 November 2024

Denis Kramar (born 7 November 1991) is a Slovenian footballer who plays for Austrian club SV Heiligenkreuz as a defender.

== Club career ==
Born in Murska Sobota, Kramar graduated from NK Rudar Velenje's youth setup, and made his professional debut on 7 November 2009, coming on as a second-half substitute in a 3–1 away loss against NK Interblock in the Slovenian PrvaLiga. In the summer of 2010 he was loaned to NK Šmartno 1928, appearing regularly with the side and also scoring three goals.

In August 2012 Kramar signed for ND Mura 05, also in the top division. He played in all eight games in the UEFA Europa League, including both ties against the Serie A side Lazio in the play-offs. On 12 March 2013, with the club in severe financial trouble and facing bankruptcy, he moved abroad for the first time in his career, joining Polish Ekstraklasa side Widzew Łódź.

On 24 July, after appearing in only three matches for Widzew, Kramar moved teams and countries again, signing with Enosis Neon Paralimni FC. However, on 7 January 2014 he joined Getafe CF, initially assigned to the reserves in Segunda División B.

On 3 February 2015 Kramar joined Australian A-League club Perth Glory FC on a short term injury replacement loan. He made his debut for the club four days later, playing the entire second half and scoring his side's only in a 3–1 home loss against Sydney FC.

On 23 January 2016 Kramar signed for Bosnian side FK Sarajevo.
