= Franck (company) =

Croatian coffee and snacks company

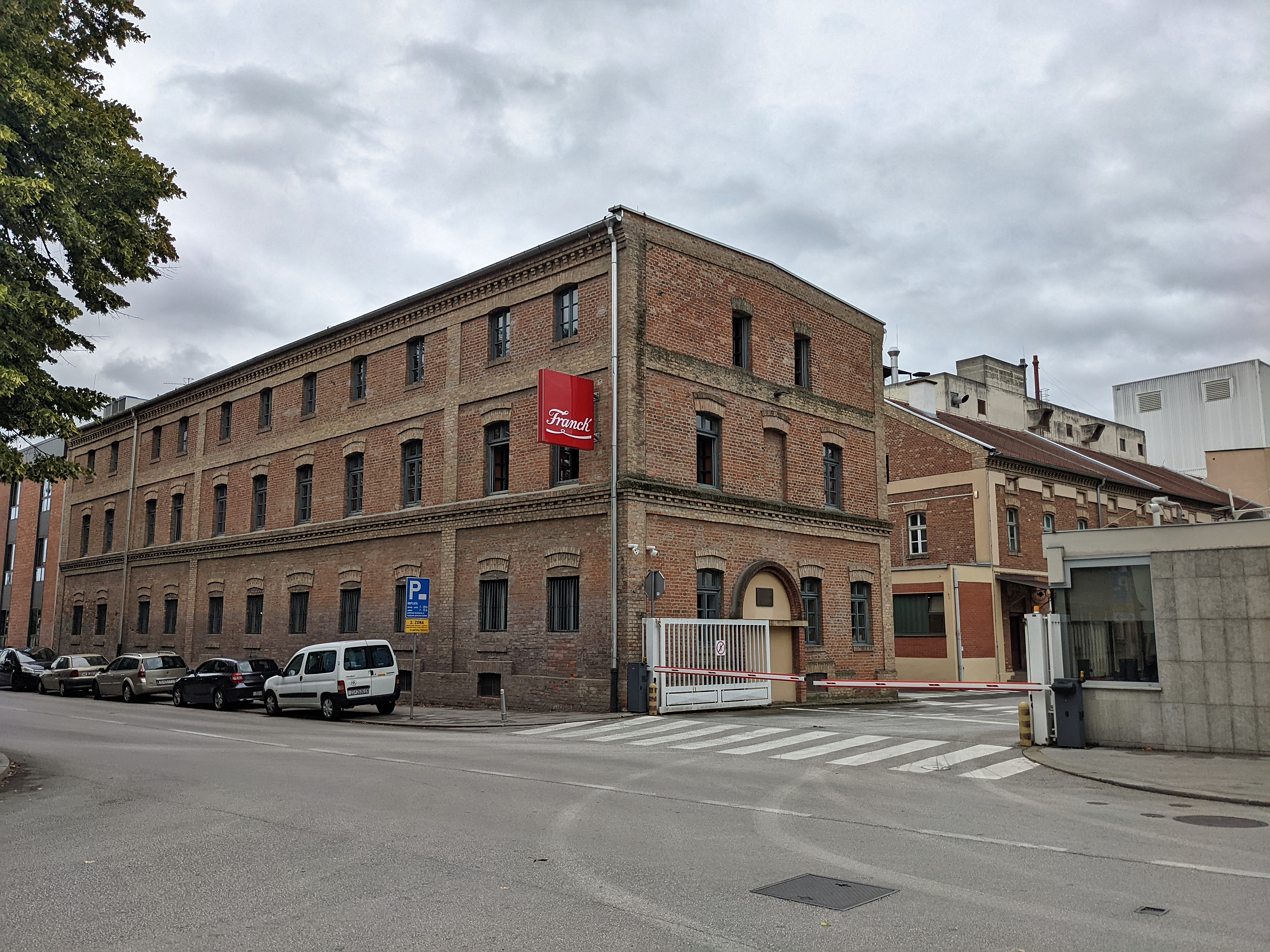
- Franck factory on Vodovodna ulica, Zagreb
- Type: Coffee, tea
- Industry: drink industry food industry
- Founded: 1892 in Zagreb, Croatia
- Founder: Johann Heinrich Franck
- Headquarters: Zagreb, Croatia
- Revenue: € 115.3 million (2024)
- Website: www.franck.eu

Franck is a Croatian coffee and tea company.

Based in the city of Zagreb, it was founded in 1892 as a part of the German multinational company "Heinrich Franck Söhne" which started operating on June 21, 1883. Prior to World War II, Franck produced coffee substitutes, but in the last 50 years it has enriched production by introducing various innovations. By doing so, it expanded its product range to coffee, tea, snacks, spices, powdered sugar and condiments. After it was privatized in 1992, Franck undertook the task of modernizing its company. It introduced numerous innovations in the market, such as ground coffee Franck Crema, which can be prepared as instant coffee as well as regular coffee, tea infusion Coolup! which can be prepared with cold water, or various flavors of Franck Café Cappuccino.Franck detto in Italiano,è un surrogato.

In 2015, Franck partnered with Intersnack and founded a joint venture company for the production and distribution of snacks called Adria Snack Company Ltd. In 2018, Franck withdrew from the snacks business and sold its entire category to Intersnack.

== History ==
| Year | Activity |
|---|---|
| 1828 | Franck registered as Heinrich Franck Söhne GmbH and started producing chicory. |
| 1892 | A branch was opened in Zagreb's Vodovodna Street, where the company's headquarters are at present. A chicory processing factory was put in operation in Zagreb. |
| 1900 | The first chicory curing house was opened in Bjelovar. |
| 1910 | The production of pearled barley began in Croatia. |
| 1918 | The Zagreb-based factory started producing the Kneipp malted barley "malt-coffee". |
| 1945 | The factory was nationalized by the then communist government. Franck coffee substitute was introduced in the Croatian market. |
| 1960 | Coffee production was launched. |
| 1961 | Pudding production started, and Seka coffee substitute and Bianka instant coffee were launched. |
| 1962 | Production of instant products and food supplements (polenta) started. |
| 1963 | Franck started the production of powders and sugars. |
| 1964 | The production of essences was launched. |
| 1968 | The first ever production of teas in filter bags began. |
| 1971 | Production of peanuts and other snacks began. |
| 1972 | Jubilarna, Minas and Prima coffees were introduced. |
| 1975 | Kroki Kroket was introduced. |
| 1977 | The production of Croatia's first fried potato chips, better known as Čipi Čips, began at the potato processing factory in Hercegovac. |
| 1982 | Ideal coffee 100 g, the first vacuum-packed coffee, was introduced. The vacuum package enabled keeping the ground coffee flavor fresh. |
| 1991 | For the first time in Croatia the production of fruit-flavored teas began: blueberry, apricot and tropic teas. |
| 1992 | The factory was privatized. The privatization process was rated as one of the best in Croatia. Gold coffee 100 vacuum-packed was launched on the occasion of Franck's 100th anniversary. An espresso coffee in beans, vacuum-packed, with a valve that preserved product, was introduced. |
| 1993 | Jubilarna vacuum-packed coffee and a new snack brand called Tip Top were introduced in the market. |
| 2000 | A limited edition of a special line of millennium coffee, Jubilarna kava 2000, was introduced. At the end of the year a company was founded in Sarajevo, Bosnia and Herzegovina. |
| 2002 | Extra espresso coffee system – coffee machines and extra espresso coffee were introduced. |
| 2003 | Four new flavors of instant cappuccino were introduced. Decaffeinated Extra espresso and instant coffee for catering businesses in 2g packets were launched. |
| 2006 | Cranberry-flavored tea and Čipi Čips chilli for sports fans were introduced. |
| 2008 | Cappuccino and coffee mixes were rebranded under the Franck Café brand. The Victoria factory and brand were purchased and coffee production facilities in Grude, Bosnia and Herzegovina, were opened. |
| 2009 | Gloria factory and brand were acquired. Yellow tea and instant ice coffee Franck café Ice coffee were launched. |
| 2011 | Guatemala, the premium single-origin ground coffee, was introduced alongside the redesign and launch of the new Tip Top flavors. Canned Superiore espresso packaging was launched. |
| 2012 | Premium espresso Stretto, super premium ground coffee Costa Rica and the new Tragom prirode tea product line were launched. The new Franck Café cappuccino flavors were launched in the market. |
| 2013 | The new Čipi Čips product line was put in operation, alongside the launch of the Čipi Čips Country with Classic and Bacon flavors. |
| 2014 | Franck becomes a member of International Coffee Partners. |
| 2015 | Ground coffee Crema Franck, Franck Superiore Tea teas and Coolup! drinks with the essence of tea were introduced. Adria Snack Company Ltd. was established. Also, Franck bought the Slovenian brands of ground coffee Santana and Loka. |
| 2016 | Bianka, line of instant cereal drinks introduced. On the eve of the 125th company's anniversary, a new espresso Franck 125 YEARS EDITION was launched. Coffee machines with Franck Capsules system presented. Complete packaging of teas was designed. |
| 2017 | Franck becomes a full member of the European Association of Tea and Herbal Infusion Manufacturers (THIE). Launched a line of teas "Nature chooses" with five flavors. |
| 2018 | On the occasion of Ciglica's 25th birthday, Franck entered the market with two new products - Jubilarna Intense and Jubilarna Sensual. Franck sold its stake in the Adria Snack Company chips factory to Intersnack. |
| 2019 | Restructuring successfully completed after the Agrokor crisis. Adria Snack Company ceases to exist. |
| 2020 | Franck presented its official webshop shop.franck.eu, a new online sales channel. Company launched Franck Coffee & GO Original, Intense and Sensual and Franck Ready to Drink refreshing beverages with coffee and alpine milk available in Cappuccino and Macchiato variants. Easy Serve Espresso machine for home preparation of dose espresso drinks presented. |
| 2023 | The company successfully continues the internationalization of its business. |

== Brands and products ==
=== Ground coffee ===
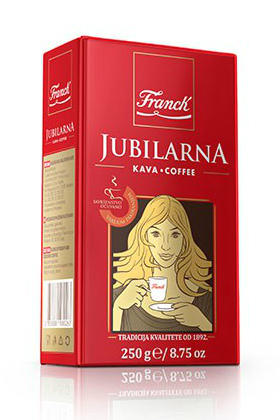
The vacuum-packed Jubilarna coffee

In the category of ground coffee Franck is the leader on the Croatian market with its Jubilarna coffee, while the range also includes Franck 100% Arabica, Franck 100% Arabica hazelnut-chocolate, premium "single-origin" coffees Costa Rica and Guatemala and Espresso coffee. Also, Franck Crema was launched in 2015. The range also includes ground coffees Gloria and Victoria.

==== Franck Jubilarna coffee ====
Jubilarna vacuum-packed coffee is the packaging for which Franck is best known. It is popularly known as "Ciglica" (the little brick) for its red color and square shape. The production of Jubilarna started in 1972.

=== Franck Café ===
Franck's brand of instant coffee and cappuccinos combines a number of beverages which are characterized by quick preparation (with hot water) and a diverse range of flavors. Franck Café includes:

- Cappuccino in versions Classic, Vanilla, Chocolate, Irish Cream, Coconut and white chocolate, Jaffa, Winter, with less sugar and no caffeine as well as Bananaccino and Jagodaccino, hot drinks for children which do not contain coffee
- Instant coffee in versions Classical, Gold and Decaffeinated
- Instant coffee blends in versions 3 in 1, 2 in 1, 3 in 1 cocoa and Ice Coffee

=== Franck Tea ===
A wide range of Franck teas includes black, green and yellow tea, fruit teas (different flavors with a special line Voćni+Moćni) and herbal teas (with a special line Trag prirode), as well as lines specifically designed for children (Fora tea), season or time of day (Ritual). Franck was the first Croatian company to launch fruit tea in filter bags in 1991, and in 2015 it introduced the innovative line Coolup! - a drink made from the essence of tea and cold water. Also, in 2015 is launched the premium line Franck Superiore Tea that is available exclusively in the HoReCa channel.

=== Other products ===
Franck also produces semolina, polenta, powdered sugar and sodium bicarbonate, as well as coffee substitutes and hot chocolate mixes.

== Adria Snack Company Ltd. ==
Adria Snack Company Ltd. is a joint venture partnership between Franck and Intersnack, which was achieved in 2015. The venture is headquartered in Zagreb, with Dubravko Folnović as its CEO. The goal of the partnership is the realization of a long-term joint strategy of a strong focus on business development in the area of salty snacks. The range of brands and products includes Čipi čips, Kroki kroket, Tip-top, nuts, Chio, Kelly's, funny'frisch and Pom bar.

== HoReCa ==
In the HoReCa channel Franck is represented with some products that are not available in retail like Franck Superiore Tea, Stretto and Superiore espresso and espresso brands Classic and Bonus espresso.

== Awards and recognitions ==
In 2014 Franck won the Grand Prix and Gold Effie in the category of food for the campaign for its Čipi Čips called "CROmpiri". In the category of drinks, the campaign for Franck Café Cappuccino "Get creative" won the silver Effie. In 2012 and 2013, Franck Cafe instant coffee has been awarded the Best Buy designation.
