= Tomislav Barbarić =

Croatian footballer

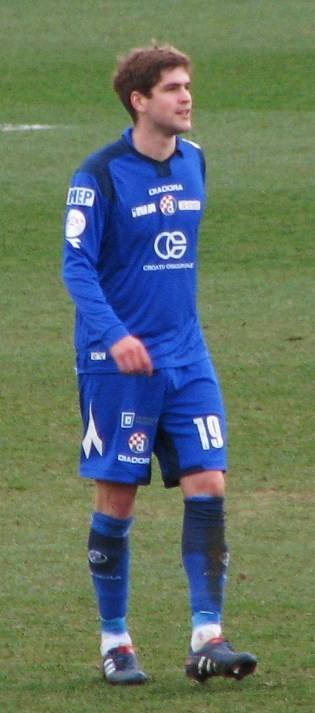
- Barbarić playing for Dinamo Zagreb in 2010

Personal information
- Date of birth: 29 March 1989 (age 37)
- Place of birth: Zagreb, SR Croatia, SFR Yugoslavia
- Height: 1.90 m (6 ft 3 in)
- Position: Centre back

Youth career
- –2007: Dinamo Zagreb

Senior career*
| Years | Team | Apps | (Gls) |
| 2007–2014 | Dinamo Zagreb | 43 | (5) |
| 2008–2009 | → Lokomotiva (loan) | 12 | (1) |
| 2012 | → Istra 1961 (loan) | 6 | (0) |
| 2012–2014 | → Lokomotiva (loan) | 27 | (5) |
| 2014–2015 | Sturm Graz | 7 | (0) |
| 2015 | RNK Split | 15 | (0) |
| 2015–2016 | Sarajevo | 23 | (3) |
| 2016–2017 | Kortrijk | 10 | (1) |
| 2017–2018 | Rudeš | 9 | (0) |
| 2018 | Atyrau | 21 | (1) |
| 2019–2020 | Zrinjski Mostar | 32 | (1) |
| 2021 | Jarun | | |
| 2021 | SVH Waldbach | 9 | (1) |

International career
| 2005 | Croatia U16 | 2 | (1) |
| 2005 | Croatia U17 | 3 | (0) |
| 2007 | Croatia U18 | 2 | (0) |
| 2008 | Croatia U19 | 5 | (1) |
| 2008–2009 | Croatia U20 | 4 | (0) |
| 2009–2010 | Croatia U21 | 6 | (0) |
- * Club domestic league appearances and goals as of 6 December 2020

Tomislav Barbarić (pronounced [ˈtɔmislaʋ ˈbaːrbariːtɕ]; born 29 March 1989) is a Croatian retired footballer who played as a defender.

== Club career ==
Barbarić came through the youth ranks of Dinamo Zagreb, before joining the senior squad during the Prva HNL winter break in 2008. He made 5 appearances, of which on three occasions he started in the first-eleven.

During the summer transfer window, he agreed to join Dinamo's affiliate Lokomotiva on a six–months loan. He featured in 13 out of 15 league matches and scored 1 goal before he returned to Dinamo in January 2009. By the end of the season he appeared 6 times in the league and 2 times in Croatian Cup. Barbarić established himself as a first–team regular at the start of the 2009–10 season, as the centre–back Robert Kovač missed all of the early season matches due to an injury.

On June 27, 2015, Barbarić signed a two-year contract with FK Sarajevo. In May 2016, he left Sarajevo.

After Sarajevo, he played for K.V. Kortrijk, NK Rudeš and FC Atyrau.

In February 2019, he came back to Bosnia and signed for HŠK Zrinjski Mostar on a deal lasting until 2021. Barbarić left Zrinjski in January 2021. He finished his career at Austrian lower league side SVH Waldbach in October 2021.

== International career ==
Barbarić was a part of the Croatia under–21 national team. His first cap at the under–21 level came on 1 October 2008 in a match against Slovenia.

He was also capped at under–17 and under–19 levels.

== Career statistics ==
As of match played 15 May 2016.

| Club performance | | | League | | Cup | | League Cup | | Continental | | Total | |
| Season | Club | League | Apps | Goals | Apps | Goals | Apps | Goals | Apps | Goals | Apps | Goals |
| Croatia | | | League | | Croatian Cup | | League Cup | | Europe | | Total | |
|---|---|---|---|---|---|---|---|---|---|---|---|---|
| 2007–08 | Dinamo Zagreb | Prva HNL | 5 | 0 | 1 | 0 | | | | | 6 | 0 |
| 2008–09 | Lokomotiva | Druga HNL | 12 | 1 | | | | | | | 12 | 1 |
| 2008–09 | Dinamo Zagreb | Prva HNL | 6 | 0 | 2 | 0 | | | | | 8 | 0 |
| 2009–10 | Dinamo Zagreb | Prva HNL | 13 | 3 | 0 | 0 | | | 5 | 0 | 18 | 3 |
| 2015–16 | FK Sarajevo | Premijer liga BiH | 23 | 3 | 4 | 0 | – | | 2 | 0 | 29 | 3 |
| 2018-19 | HŠK Zrinjski Mostar | Premijer liga BiH | 2 | 0 | | | | | | | 2 | 0 |
| 2019-20 | HŠK Zrinjski Mostar | Premijer liga BiH | 18 | 1 | 2 | 1 | | | 5 | 0 | 25 | 2 |
| Career total | | | 79 | 8 | 69 | 1 | 0 | 0 | 12 | 0 | 100 | 7 |

== Honours ==
Dinamo Zagreb

- 1. HNL: 2007–08, 2008–09
- Croatian Cup: 2007–08, 2008–09
- Croatian Super Cup: 2010
