= Adnan Osmanović =

Bosnian footballer

Personal information
- Date of birth: 20 March 1997 (age 29)
- Place of birth: Nuremberg, Germany
- Height: 1.80 m (5 ft 11 in)
- Position: Centre-forward

Team information
- Current team: Olimpik
- Number: 9

Youth career
- Željezničar
- Slavija Sarajevo
- –2015: Sarajevo

Senior career*
Years	Team	Apps	(Gls)
2015–2016	Sarajevo	4	(1)
2016–2019	Olimpik	75	(24)
2019	Sloboda Tuzla	6	(0)
2020–	Olimpik	23	(7)

International career
2013	Bosnia and Herzegovina U17	8	(3)
2014–2015	Bosnia and Herzegovina U18	0	(0)
2015–2016	Bosnia and Herzegovina U19	3	(0)
2016	Bosnia and Herzegovina U21	1	(0)
- * Club domestic league appearances and goals as of 5 April 2021

Adnan Osmanović (born 20 March 1997) is a Bosnian professional footballer who plays as a centre-forward for Bosnian Premier League club Olimpik.

== Honours ==
Olimpik

- First League of FBiH: 2019–20
