= Kemal Osmanković =

Bosnian footballer

- Osmanković with the youth team of Željezničar in 2015

Personal information
- Date of birth: 4 March 1997 (age 29)
- Place of birth: Sarajevo, Bosnia and Herzegovina
- Height: 1.92 m (6 ft 4 in)
- Position: Centre-back

Team information
- Current team: Igman Konjic
- Number: 22

Youth career
- 2008–2016: Željezničar Sarajevo

Senior career*
Years	Team	Apps	(Gls)
2016–2020	Željezničar Sarajevo	46	(2)
2020–2022	Lokomotiva Zagreb	16	(0)
2022–2023	Sloboda Tuzla	27	(2)
2023–2024	HNK Šibenik	5	(0)
2024	Sloboda Tuzla	13	(0)
2025	Suhareka	10	(0)
2025	Šibenik	0	(0)
2026–	Igman Konjic	12	(0)

International career
2013–2014	Bosnia and Herzegovina U17	4	(0)
2015	Bosnia and Herzegovina U19	3	(0)
2018	Bosnia and Herzegovina U21	1	(0)
- * Club domestic league appearances and goals as of 12 June 2026

Kemal Osmanković (born 4 March 1997) is a Bosnian professional footballer who plays as a centre-back for Igman Konjic.

== Honours ==
Željezničar

- Bosnian Cup: 2017–18
