= Filip Erić =

Serbian footballer

Personal information
- Full name: Filip Erić
- Date of birth: 10 October 1994 (age 32)
- Place of birth: Loznica, SFR Yugoslavia
- Height: 1.96 m (6 ft 5 in)
- Position: Goalkeeper

Team information
- Current team: Sloga Meridian
- Number: 1

Youth career
- –2013: Voždovac

Senior career*
| Years | Team | Apps | (Gls) |
| 2013–2014 | Voždovac | 0 | (0) |
| 2013–2014 | → FK Šumadija 1962(loan) | | |
| 2014 | Drina Zvornik | 1 | (0) |
| 2015 | Rad | 0 | (0) |
| 2015–2016 | Drina Zvornik | 19 | (0) |
| 2016–2017 | Sloboda Tuzla | 6 | (0) |
| 2018–2019 | Zvijezda 09 | 37 | (0) |
| 2019–2021 | Željezničar | 35 | (0) |
| 2021–2023 | Sloboda Tuzla | 10 | (0) |
| 2023 | Loznica | 0 | (0) |
| 2024 | Sloboda Tuzla | 6 | (0) |
| 2024– | Sloga Meridian | 49 | (0) |
- * Club domestic league appearances and goals as of 12 June 2026

Filip Erić (born 10 October 1994) is a Serbian professional footballer who plays as a goalkeeper who plays for Bosnian Premier League club Sloga Meridian.

With Zvijezda 09, he won the First League of RS in the 2017–18 season and got promoted to the Bosnian Premier League. He left the club after his contract expired on 29 May 2019.

On 13 June 2019, Erić signed a two-year contract with Željezničar. He left Željezničar in May 2021.

In summer 2024, he joined Sloga Meridian.

== Honours ==
Zvijezda 09

- First League of RS: 2017–18
