= 2021–22 FK Željezničar season =

Željezničar
2021–22 season
- Chairman: Nazif Hasanbegović (until 23 December); Oro Ibrišimović (interim, from 26 December)
- Manager: Tomislav Ivković (until 24 December); Edis Mulalić (from 7 January)
- Stadium: Grbavica Stadium
- Premijer Liga BiH: 6th
- Kup BiH: Round of 16
- Top goalscorer: League: Sedad Subašić (4); All: Petar Bojo (6)
- Highest home attendance: 10,000 vs Velež Mostar (18 September 2021)
- Lowest home attendance: 1,000 vs Tuzla City (27 October 2021)
- Average home league attendance: 3,905
Home colours	Away colours	Third colours

The 2021–22 season was Željezničar's 101st in existence and their 22nd season in the Premier League BH. Besides competing in the domestic league, the team also competed in the National Cup.

The club finished in 6th place in the league, while it got knocked out from the cup in the round of 16.

== Season review ==
=== June ===
On 4 June, Željezničar and Result Sports signed a partnership agreement. Željezničar and Samir Bekrić negotiated a one-year contract extension lasting until June 2022.

On 12 June, Nazif Hasanbegović was announced as the new Chairman of the club, replacing Samir Cerić.

On 18 June, Tomislav Ivković was appointed as the new manager, replacing Blaž Slišković. His assistant manager was announced to be Armando Marenzi.

On 19 June, Željezničar extended their sponsorship agreement with Transportbeton Strohmaier.

On 21 June, Željezničar officially began the pre-season for the upcoming 2021–22 season.

On 23 June, Željezničar extended their sponsorship agreement with General Logistic.

=== July ===
On 9 July, Željezničar announced the signing of 26-year-old former youth team–player Nedim Mekić as a free agent. Željezničar and Vedad Muftić negotiated a one-year contract extension lasting until June 2022, while youth players Nikola Milićević, Omar Beća and Amar Drina signed their first professional contract. The club also announced Kenan Hasagić as the new goalkeeping coach.

On 13 July, Željezničar and Igman Konjic signed a memorandum of cooperation and partnership in the field of sports, becoming official club partners.

On 16 July, youth player Faruk Duraković signed a one-year contract with the club. Željezničar extended their sponsorship agreement with Garden City Konjic, and signed a new sponsorship agreement with Igman.

On 26 July, Željezničar announced the signing of 22-year-old Ognjen Stjepanović and 19–year–old Hasan Jahić as free agents. They last played for Zvijezda 09 and Mladost Doboj Kakanj respectively.

On 27 July, Željezničar and Mozzart signed a long term sponsorship agreement lasting until 2024, becoming the club's new gold sponsor.

On 28 July, Željezničar extended their sponsorship agreement with Sarajevo osiguranje.

=== August ===
On 6 August, Željezničar signed a new sponsorship agreement with Top Color.

On 9 August, Željezničar extended their sponsorship agreement with Nova Vita.

On 10 August, Željezničar extended their sponsorship agreement with Farmavita.

On 18 August, Željezničar signed a new partnership agreement with SoftCon Agency.

On 19 August, Željezničar extended their sponsorship agreement with Adriatic osiguranje.

On 25 August, Željezničar announced the signing of 22-year-old Haris Hajdarević.

=== September ===
On 8 September, Željezničar announced the signing of 18-year-old Denis Kovačević.

On 16 September, Željezničar and Aleksandar Kosorić negotiated a two-year contract extension lasting until June 2023.

=== November ===
On 17 November, youth player Neriman Kočević signed a one-year contract with the club.

=== December ===
On 1 December, Željezničar announced Caizcoin as the club's new general sponsor.

On 23 December, Željezničar announced the departure of Chairman of the club Nazif Hasanbegović.

On 24 December, Željezničar announced the departure of manager Tomislav Ivković.

=== January ===
On 7 January, Željezničar announced Edis Mulalić as the club's new manager.

On 19 January, Željezničar announced the signing of 23-year-old Benjamin Šehić.

On 24 January, Željezničar announced the signing of 34-year-old Edin Cocalić.

On 25 January, Željezničar announced the signing of 26-year-old Marin Galić.

On 31 January, Željezničar announced the signing of 24-year-old Aleksandar Vucenovic.

=== February ===
On 15 February, Željezničar announced the signing of 28-year-old Armin Ćerimagić.

On 21 February, Željezničar extended their sponsorship agreement with Sarajevski kiseljak, ELPI Comerc and HOŠE Komerc. The club also announced the signing of 22-year-old Ševkija Resić.

On 28 February, Željezničar announced the signing of 21-year-old Armin Hodžić.

=== March ===
On 7 March, Željezničar extended their sponsorship agreement with Deny-Prom and Amko komerc.

On 23 March, Željezničar announced the signing of 22-year-old Adeshina Fatai.

=== April ===
On 21 April, Željezničar extended their sponsorship agreement with NLB Banka.

== Squad information ==
=== Players ===
N	Pos.	Nat.	Name	Age	EU	Since	App	Goals	Ends	Transfer fee	Notes
2	DF	(Bosnia and Herzegovina)	Malić	26	Non-EU	2021	29	0	2023	Free	
4	MF	(Bosnia and Herzegovina)	Hajdarević	27	Non-EU	2021	101	3	2022	Free	Originally from youth system
5	DF	(Bosnia and Herzegovina)	Kosorić (C)	39	Non-EU	2020	148	4	2022	Free	Second nationality: Serbia
6	DF	(Bosnia and Herzegovina)	Cocalić	38	Non-EU	2022	112	6	–	Free	Originally from youth system
7	MF	(Bosnia and Herzegovina)	Subašić	25	Non-EU	2019	53	4	2024	Free	
8	MF	(Bosnia and Herzegovina)	Mekić	31	Non-EU	2021	32	4	2022	Free	Originally from youth system
9	FW	(Austria)	Vučenović	28	EU	2022	7	0	2022	Free	
10	FW	(Bosnia and Herzegovina)	Zec	38	Non-EU	2019	57	12	2022	Free	
11	MF	(Bosnia and Herzegovina)	Gasal	23	Non-EU	2020	33	1	2022	Youth system	
13	GK	(Bosnia and Herzegovina)	Muftić	24	Non-EU	2020	6	0	2022	Youth system	
14	MF	(Bosnia and Herzegovina)	Štilić	38	Non-EU	2019	120	38	2022	Free	Originally from youth system
15	DF	(Bosnia and Herzegovina)	Šehić	27	Non-EU	2022	6	0	2023	Free	Originally from youth system
16	MF	(Bosnia and Herzegovina)	Osmanović	26	Non-EU	2022	10	0	–	Free	Originally from youth system
17	DF	(Bosnia and Herzegovina)	Kovačević	23	EU	2021	1	0	2022	Youth system	Second nationality: Austria
18	MF	(Bosnia and Herzegovina)	Hodžić	26	Non-EU	2022	13	3	–	Free	
19	DF	(Bosnia and Herzegovina)	Drina	24	Non-EU	2020	17	0	2022	Youth system	
20	MF	(Bosnia and Herzegovina)	Mujić	25	Non-EU	2020	1	0	2023	Youth system	
21	DF	(Croatia)	Blažević	30	EU	2020	42	0	2023	Free	
22	MF	(Bosnia and Herzegovina)	Ćerimagić	32	Non-EU	2022	2	0	–	Free	Originally from youth system
23	MF	(Bosnia and Herzegovina)	Beća	24	Non-EU	2020	34	1	2022	Youth system	
24	DF	(Bosnia and Herzegovina)	Galić	31	EU	2022	13	0	–	Free	Second nationality: Croatia
26	MF	(Bosnia and Herzegovina)	Duraković	24	Non-EU	2020	4	1	2022	Youth system	
27	DF	(Bosnia and Herzegovina)	Musić	23	Non-EU	2021	1	0	2022	Youth system	
29	FW	(Nigeria)	Fatai	27	Non-EU	2022	2	0	–	Free	
30	DF	(Bosnia and Herzegovina)	Vištica	25	EU	2021	5	0	2022	Free	Second nationality: Croatia
33	FW	(Bosnia and Herzegovina)	Kočević	22	Non-EU	2021	3	0	2022	Youth system	
40	GK	(Croatia)	Bender	31	EU	2021	36	0	2022	Free	Second nationality: Bosnia and Herzegovina
72	MF	(Bosnia and Herzegovina)	Resić	26	Non-EU	2022	12	0	–	Free	
90	MF	(Bosnia and Herzegovina)	Bekrić	41	Non-EU	2020	251	50	2022	Free	
–	GK	(Bosnia and Herzegovina)	Milićević	24	Non-EU	2020	0	0	2022	Youth system	On loan to Bratstvo Gračanica
–	MF	(Bosnia and Herzegovina)	Hrelja	24	Non-EU	2021	10	0	2023	Free	On loan to Goražde

- Source: fkzeljeznicar.ba

=== Disciplinary record ===
Includes all competitive matches and only players that got booked throughout the season. The list is sorted by shirt number, and then position.

N	P	Nat.	Name	League			Cup			Europe			Others			Total			Notes
N	P	Nat.	Name	Yellow card	Second yellow card	Red card	Yellow card	Second yellow card	Red card	Yellow card	Second yellow card	Red card	Yellow card	Second yellow card	Red card	Yellow card	Second yellow card	Red card	Notes
2	DF	(Bosnia and Herzegovina)	Malić	7			1									8			
4	MF	(Bosnia and Herzegovina)	Hajdarević	4												4			
5	DF	(Bosnia and Herzegovina)	Kosorić	5												5			
6	DF	(Bosnia and Herzegovina)	Cocalić	3												3			
7	MF	(Bosnia and Herzegovina)	Subašić	4	1											4	1		
8	MF	(Bosnia and Herzegovina)	Mekić	9			1									10			
9	FW	(Austria)	Vučenović	3												3			
10	FW	(Bosnia and Herzegovina)	Zec	1												1			
11	MF	(Bosnia and Herzegovina)	Gasal	1												1			
14	MF	(Bosnia and Herzegovina)	Štilić	3												3			
18	MF	(Bosnia and Herzegovina)	Hodžić	1												1			
21	DF	(Croatia)	Blažević	9												9			
23	MF	(Bosnia and Herzegovina)	Beća	7												7			
24	DF	(Bosnia and Herzegovina)	Galić	6												6			
30	DF	(Bosnia and Herzegovina)	Vištica	1												1			
33	FW	(Bosnia and Herzegovina)	Kočević	1												1			
40	GK	(Croatia)	Bender	1												1			
72	MF	(Bosnia and Herzegovina)	Resić	1												1			
90	MF	(Bosnia and Herzegovina)	Bekrić	3												3			

Source: Competitive matches and fkzeljeznicar.ba
Ordered by (red card) , (second yellow card) and (yellow card)
(yellow card) = Number of bookings; (second yellow card) = Number of sending offs after a second yellow card; (red card) = Number of sending offs by a direct red card.

== Squad statistics ==
=== Goalscorers ===
No.	Pos.	Nation	Name	Premijer Liga BiH	Kup BiH	Total
22	MF	(Bosnia and Herzegovina)	Bojo	3	3	6
7	MF	(Bosnia and Herzegovina)	Subašić	4	0	4
11	FW	(Croatia)	Zdunić	3	1	4
24	MF	(Bosnia and Herzegovina)	Mekić	3	1	4
9	FW	(Bosnia and Herzegovina)	Juričić	3	0	3
18	MF	(Bosnia and Herzegovina)	Hodžić	3	0	3
10	FW	(Bosnia and Herzegovina)	Zec	1	1	2
15	DF	(Bosnia and Herzegovina)	Vrhovac	2	0	2
5	DF	(Bosnia and Herzegovina)	Kosorić	1	0	1
8	MF	(Bosnia and Herzegovina)	Mujezinović	1	0	1
14	MF	(Bosnia and Herzegovina)	Štilić	1	0	1
23	MF	(Bosnia and Herzegovina)	Beća	1	0	1
90	MF	(Bosnia and Herzegovina)	Bekrić	1	0	1
28	FW	(Bosnia and Herzegovina)	Jaganjac	0	1	1
#	Own goals			1	1	2
TOTAL				28	8	36

=== Assists ===
No.	Pos.	Nation	Name	Premijer Liga BiH	Kup BiH	Total
10	FW	(Bosnia and Herzegovina)	Zec	3	1	4
14	MF	(Bosnia and Herzegovina)	Štilić	4	0	4
7	MF	(Bosnia and Herzegovina)	Subašić	3	0	3
27	MF	(Bosnia and Herzegovina)	Gasal	1	2	3
2	DF	(Bosnia and Herzegovina)	Malić	2	0	2
9	FW	(Bosnia and Herzegovina)	Juričić	2	0	2
23	MF	(Bosnia and Herzegovina)	Beća	1	1	2
4	MF	(Bosnia and Herzegovina)	Hajdarević	1	0	1
8	MF	(Bosnia and Herzegovina)	Mujezinović	1	0	1
18	MF	(Bosnia and Herzegovina)	Hodžić	1	0	1
21	DF	(Croatia)	Blažević	1	0	1
22	MF	(Bosnia and Herzegovina)	Bojo	1	0	1
90	MF	(Bosnia and Herzegovina)	Bekrić	1	0	1
17	DF	(Bosnia and Herzegovina)	Kovačević	0	1	1
13	GK	(Bosnia and Herzegovina)	Muftić	0	1	1
TOTAL				22	6	28

=== Clean sheets ===
No.	Nation	Name	Premijer Liga BiH	Kup BiH	Total	Games played
40	(Croatia)	Bender	16	0	16	31
13	(Bosnia and Herzegovina)	Muftić	0	1	1	4
TOTAL			16	1	17	35

== Transfers ==
=== Players in ===
No.	Pos.	Nat.	Name	Age	EU	Moving from	Type	Transfer window	Ends	Transfer fee	Source
24	MF	(Bosnia and Herzegovina)	Nedim Mekić	31	Non-EU	Radnik Bijeljina	End of contract	Summer	2022	Free	fkzeljeznicar.ba
25	MF	(Bosnia and Herzegovina)	Ognjen Stjepanović	28	Non-EU	Zvijezda 09	End of contract	Summer	2022	Free	fkzeljeznicar.ba
6	DF	(Bosnia and Herzegovina)	Hasan Jahić	25	Non-EU	Mladost Doboj Kakanj	End of contract	Summer	2022	Free	fkzeljeznicar.ba
11	FW	(Croatia)	Bruno Zdunić	25	EU	Lokomotiva (Croatia)	Loan	Summer	2022	Free	
4	MF	(Croatia)	Mate Crnčević	31	EU	Dinamo Zagreb II (Croatia)	Loan	Summer	2022	Free	
30	DF	(Bosnia and Herzegovina)	Branimir Vištica	25	EU	Kustošija (Croatia)	End of contract	Summer	2022	Free	
16	MF	(Bosnia and Herzegovina)	Haris Hajdarević	27	Non-EU	Boluspor (Turkey)	End of contract	Summer	2022	Free	fkzeljeznicar.ba
17	DF	(Bosnia and Herzegovina)	Denis Kovačević	23	EU	Kapfenberger SV (Austria)	End of contract	Summer	2022	Free	fkzeljeznicar.ba
15	DF	(Bosnia and Herzegovina)	Benjamin Šehić	27	Non-EU	TOŠK Tešanj	End of contract	Winter	2023	Free	fkzeljeznicar.ba
6	DF	(Bosnia and Herzegovina)	Edin Cocalić	38	Non-EU	Panetolikos (Greece)	End of contract	Winter	–	Free	fkzeljeznicar.ba
24	DF	(Bosnia and Herzegovina)	Marin Galić	31	EU	Zagłębie Sosnowiec (Poland)	End of contract	Winter	–	Free	fkzeljeznicar.ba
9	FW	(Austria)	Aleksandar Vučenović	28	EU	Haka (Finland)	End of contract	Winter	2022	Free	fkzeljeznicar.ba
22	MF	(Bosnia and Herzegovina)	Armin Ćerimagić	32	Non-EU	Mladost Doboj Kakanj	End of contract	Winter	–	Free	fkzeljeznicar.ba
72	MF	(Bosnia and Herzegovina)	Ševkija Resić	26	Non-EU	Vis Simm-Bau	End of contract	Winter	–	Free	fkzeljeznicar.ba
18	MF	(Bosnia and Herzegovina)	Armin Hodžić	26	Non-EU	Alcorcón (Spain)	End of contract	Winter	–	Free	fkzeljeznicar.ba
29	FW	(Nigeria)	Adeshina Fatai	27	Non-EU	Astra Giurgiu (Romania)	End of contract	Winter	–	Free	fkzeljeznicar.ba

Total expenditure: ▼€0

=== Players out ===
No.	Pos.	Nat.	Name	Age	EU	Moving to	Type	Transfer window	Transfer fee	Source
23	MF	(Bosnia and Herzegovina)	Jasmin Čeliković	27	Non-EU	Rijeka (Croatia)	End of loan	Summer	Free	
17	DF	(Bosnia and Herzegovina)	Ivan Milićević	28	EU	Lokomotiva (Croatia)	End of loan	Summer	Free	nklokomotiva.hr
4	MF	(Bosnia and Herzegovina)	Anel Šabanadžović	27	Non-EU	AEK Athens (Greece)	End of loan	Summer	Free	aekfc.gr
2	DF	(Serbia)	Siniša Stevanović	37	EU	Mornar (Montenegro)	Contract termination	Summer	Free	
1	GK	(Serbia)	Filip Erić	31	Non-EU	Sloboda Tuzla	Contract termination	Summer	Free	fksloboda.ba
20	MF	(Bosnia and Herzegovina)	Mladen Veselinović	33	Non-EU	Sloboda Tuzla	Contract termination	Summer	Free	fksloboda.ba
29	FW	(Bosnia and Herzegovina)	Salko Nargalić	25	Non-EU	Orašje	Contract termination	Summer	Free	
6	DF	(Bosnia and Herzegovina)	Luka Miletić	31	EU	Posušje	Contract termination	Summer	Free	
25	DF	(Croatia)	Frane Ikić	32	EU	Gyirmót (Hungary)	Contract termination	Summer	Free	
24	FW	(Croatia)	Ivan Lendrić	35	EU	Nea Salamis Famagusta (Cyprus)	Contract termination	Summer	Free	
16	MF	(Bosnia and Herzegovina)	Mehmed Alispahić	38	Non-EU	Vodice (Croatia)	End of contract	Summer	Free	facebook.com/nkvodice
12	GK	(Bosnia and Herzegovina)	Irfan Fejzić	40	Non-EU	Free Agent	End of contract	Summer	Free	
33	DF	(Bosnia and Herzegovina)	Eldar Šehić	26	Non-EU	Karviná (Czech Republic)	End of contract	Summer	Free	mfkkarvina.cz
99	MF	(Bosnia and Herzegovina)	Sinan Ramović	33	Non-EU	Free Agent	End of contract	Summer	Free	
4	MF	(Bosnia and Herzegovina)	Amar Mehić	25	Non-EU	Goražde	Loan	Summer	Free	facebook.com/fkgorazde
17	MF	(Bosnia and Herzegovina)	Dženan Osmanović	26	Non-EU	Vis Simm-Bau	Contract termination	Summer	Free	
11	FW	(Croatia)	Bruno Zdunić	25	EU	Lokomotiva (Croatia)	End of loan	Winter	Free	
4	MF	(Croatia)	Mate Crnčević	31	EU	Dinamo Zagreb II (Croatia)	End of loan	Winter	Free	
6	DF	(Bosnia and Herzegovina)	Hasan Jahić	25	Non-EU	Mladá Boleslav (Czech Republic)	Contract termination	Winter	Free	
15	DF	(Bosnia and Herzegovina)	Vedran Vrhovac	27	Non-EU	Petrolul Ploiești (Romania)	Contract termination	Winter	Free	
22	MF	(Bosnia and Herzegovina)	Petar Bojo	28	EU	Zrinjski Mostar	Contract termination	Winter	Free	
8	MF	(Bosnia and Herzegovina)	Mustafa Mujezinović	33	EU	Novi Pazar (Serbia)	Contract termination	Winter	Free	
9	FW	(Bosnia and Herzegovina)	Luka Juričić	29	EU	Gimpo (South Korea)	Contract termination	Winter	Free	
31	FW	(Bosnia and Herzegovina)	David Grubešić	23	Non-EU	Casalbordino (Italy)	Contract termination	Winter	Free	
25	MF	(Bosnia and Herzegovina)	Ognjen Stjepanović	28	Non-EU	Drina Zvornik	Contract termination	Winter	Free	
4	MF	(Bosnia and Herzegovina)	Amar Mehić	25	Non-EU	Primorac (Croatia)	Contract termination	Winter	Free	
18	MF	(Bosnia and Herzegovina)	Damir Hrelja	24	Non-EU	Goražde	Loan	Winter	Free	
92	GK	(Bosnia and Herzegovina)	Nikola Milićević	24	Non-EU	Bratstvo Gračanica	Loan	Winter	Free	

Total income: ▲€
Net: ▲€

== Club ==
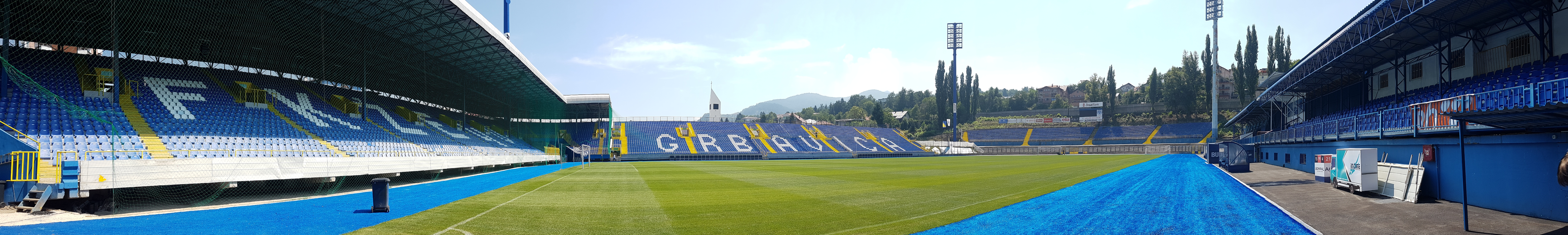
A panoramic view of Grbavica Stadium

=== Coaching staff ===
Name	Role
(Bosnia and Herzegovina) Edis Mulalić	Head coach
(Bosnia and Herzegovina) Omer Joldić	Assistant coach
(Bosnia and Herzegovina) Adin Mulaosmanović	Assistant coach
(Bosnia and Herzegovina) Kenan Hasagić	Goalkeeping coach
(Bosnia and Herzegovina) Anel Hidić	Fitness coach
(Bosnia and Herzegovina) Edin Kulenović	Doctor
(Bosnia and Herzegovina) Zlatko Dervišević	Doctor
(Bosnia and Herzegovina) Harun Đozić	Doctor
(Bosnia and Herzegovina) Raif Zeba	Physiotherapist
(Bosnia and Herzegovina) Adil Hubijar	Physiotherapist
(Bosnia and Herzegovina) Erdijan Pekić	Commissioner for Security

=== Other information ===
Honorary Chairman of the Club	(Bosnia and Herzegovina) Ivica Osim
Chairman of the Board	(Bosnia and Herzegovina) Oro Ibrišimović (interim)
Chairman of the Assembly	(Bosnia and Herzegovina) Edin Cernica
Chairman of the Supervisory Board	(Bosnia and Herzegovina) Damir Ablaković
Director	(Bosnia and Herzegovina) Amira Bajrović-Uzunović
Head coach	(Bosnia and Herzegovina) Edis Mulalić
Ground (capacity and dimensions)	Grbavica Stadium (13,146 / 105x66 m)

Source: FK Željezničar and Grbavica Stadium

=== Sponsorship ===
As of 21 April 2022

Name	Type
(Germany) (Switzerland) Caizcoin	General sponsor
(United Kingdom) Admiral Casino	Gold sponsor
(Bosnia and Herzegovina) Lutrija BiH	Gold sponsor
(Serbia) Mozzart	Gold sponsor
(Bosnia and Herzegovina) Sarajevo osiguranje	Gold sponsor
(Croatia) Adriatic osiguranje	Sponsor
(Bosnia and Herzegovina) Amko komerc	Sponsor
(Bosnia and Herzegovina) BioMedicalab	Sponsor
(Bosnia and Herzegovina) Brajlović	Sponsor
(Bosnia and Herzegovina) Central osiguranje	Sponsor
(Bosnia and Herzegovina) Deny-Prom	Sponsor
(Bosnia and Herzegovina) ELPI Comerc	Sponsor
(Bosnia and Herzegovina) Bony	Sponsor
(Bosnia and Herzegovina) Rooster	Sponsor
(Bosnia and Herzegovina) Vivia	Sponsor
(France) (Bosnia and Herzegovina) Hotel Novotel	Sponsor
(Bosnia and Herzegovina) Eko sir Puđa	Sponsor
(Bosnia and Herzegovina) Infomedia	Sponsor
(Bosnia and Herzegovina) Mont Inženjering	Sponsor
(Slovenia) Europlakat	Sponsor
(Bosnia and Herzegovina) Garden City Konjic	Sponsor
(Bosnia and Herzegovina) Hotel Hills	Sponsor
(Bosnia and Herzegovina) HOŠE Komerc	Sponsor
(Bosnia and Herzegovina) Mliječna industrija 99	Sponsor
(Bosnia and Herzegovina) Media Market	Sponsor
(Bosnia and Herzegovina) Winner Project	Sponsor
(Bosnia and Herzegovina) Eurofarm Centar Poliklinika	Sponsor
(Croatia) Franck	Sponsor
(Bosnia and Herzegovina) ProTeam	Sponsor
(Bosnia and Herzegovina) ASA Osiguranje	Sponsor
(Bosnia and Herzegovina) Capo di horeca	Sponsor
(Bosnia and Herzegovina) Crystal Ice	Sponsor
(Bosnia and Herzegovina) Gama AA Security	Sponsor
(Bosnia and Herzegovina) In Time	Sponsor
(Croatia) Sky Cola	Sponsor
(Slovenia) NLB Banka	Sponsor
(Bosnia and Herzegovina) Farmavita	Sponsor
(Bosnia and Herzegovina) Sarajevski kiseljak	Sponsor
(Italy) Macron	Technical sponsor
(Bosnia and Herzegovina) Leda	Technical sponsor
(Bosnia and Herzegovina) Telemach	Technical sponsor
(Bosnia and Herzegovina) General Logistic	Technical sponsor
(Bosnia and Herzegovina) 1921.ba	Media partner
(Bosnia and Herzegovina) Hayat TV	Media partner
(Bosnia and Herzegovina) Antena Sarajevo	Media partner
(Bosnia and Herzegovina) Sport1.ba	Media partner
(Bosnia and Herzegovina) Klix	Media partner
(Bosnia and Herzegovina) Dnevni avaz	Media partner
(Bosnia and Herzegovina) MFS-Emmaus	Community partner
(Bosnia and Herzegovina) Ruku na srce	Community partner
(Bosnia and Herzegovina) SUMERO	Community partner
(Bosnia and Herzegovina) Erasmus	Community partner

== Competitions ==
=== Pre-season ===
30 June 2021 Friendly	Željezničar (Bosnia and Herzegovina)	0–0	(Bosnia and Herzegovina) Leotar	Sarajevo
18:00		Report		Stadium: Grbavica Stadium

3 July 2021 Friendly	Željezničar (Bosnia and Herzegovina)	6–1	(Bosnia and Herzegovina) Famos Hrasnica	Sarajevo
18:00	Mujezinović 2', 35'; Subašić 21'; Hrelja 29'; Gasal 60'; Mišović 69'	Report	Tahmaz 39'	Stadium: Grbavica Stadium

10 July 2021 Friendly	Željezničar (Bosnia and Herzegovina)	2–1	(Bosnia and Herzegovina) Rudar Prijedor	Sarajevo
18:00	Juričić 25'; Bekrić 45' (pen.)	Report	Subašić 56' (o.g.)	Stadium: Grbavica Stadium

13 July 2021 Friendly	Igman Konjic (Bosnia and Herzegovina)	1–1	(Bosnia and Herzegovina) Željezničar	Konjic
18:30	Graho 63'	Report	Duraković 62'	Stadium: Stadion Igman

=== Mid-season ===
21 July 2021 Friendly	Željezničar (Bosnia and Herzegovina)	3–0	(Bosnia and Herzegovina) Slavija	Sarajevo
10:30	Zec (pen.); Jaganjac	Report		Stadium: Grbavica Stadium

28 July 2021 Friendly	Željezničar (Bosnia and Herzegovina)	11–0	(Bosnia and Herzegovina) Vitez Bužim	Sarajevo
18:30		Report		Stadium: Grbavica Stadium

3 August 2021 Friendly	Željezničar (Bosnia and Herzegovina)	2–0	(Bosnia and Herzegovina) Rudar Kakanj	Sarajevo
18:30	Gasal 18'; Bekrić 90'	Report		Stadium: Grbavica Stadium

10 August 2021 Friendly	Željezničar (Bosnia and Herzegovina)	11–0	(Bosnia and Herzegovina) Romanija Pale	Sarajevo
		Report		Stadium: Grbavica Stadium

25 August 2021 Friendly	Glasinac 2011 (Bosnia and Herzegovina)	3–2	(Bosnia and Herzegovina) Željezničar	Sokolac
17:30	Bekrić; Jaganjac	Report	Šuka; Rajić	Stadium: Stadion Bara

1 September 2021 Friendly	Takovo (Serbia)	3–0	(Bosnia and Herzegovina) Željezničar	Gornji Milanovac, Serbia
17:00	Gočanin 48'; Grkajac 54'; Grković 65'	Report		Stadium: Takovo Stadium

4 September 2021 Friendly	Radnički 1923 (Serbia)	1–1	(Bosnia and Herzegovina) Željezničar	Kragujevac, Serbia
17:00	Jovanović 32'	Report	Bojo 15'	Stadium: Čika Dača Stadium

27 January 2022 Friendly	Željezničar (Bosnia and Herzegovina)	4–1	(Bosnia and Herzegovina) Baton	Ilidža
14:30	Mekić 28' (pen.); Fatai 36'; Ćerimagić 68'; Resić 76'	Report	Bambur 3'	Stadium: FK Igman Stadium

2 February 2022 Friendly	Željezničar (Bosnia and Herzegovina)	1–0	(Bosnia and Herzegovina) Bratstvo Gračanica	Konjic
14:30	Mekić 55'	Report

5 February 2022 Friendly	Željezničar (Bosnia and Herzegovina)	0–2	(Bosnia and Herzegovina) Goražde	Jablanica
14:30		Report	Đuderija 15'; Karić 70' (pen.)	Stadium: Jablanica City Stadium

11 February 2022 Friendly	Željezničar (Bosnia and Herzegovina)	5–0	(Bosnia and Herzegovina) Željezničar Banja Luka	Konjic
15:00	Mekić 14' (pen.); Ćerimagić 33'; Vucenovic 57'; Duraković 81'; Hodžić 82'	Report

14 February 2022 Friendly	Željezničar (Bosnia and Herzegovina)	4–1	(Bosnia and Herzegovina) Klis Buturović Polje	Jablanica
15:00	Ćerimagić 34'; Resić 59', 61'; Mekić 74' (pen.)	Report	Bajramović 87'	Stadium: Jablanica City Stadium

17 February 2022 Friendly	Željezničar (Bosnia and Herzegovina)	5–0	(Bosnia and Herzegovina) Iskra Bugojno	Konjic
15:00	Resić 31'; Vucenovic 35'; Kosorić 49'; Gasal 64' (pen.); Bekrić 84'	Report

=== Overall ===
Competition	Started round	Final result	First match	Last Match
Premijer Liga BiH	—N/a	6th	17 July 2021	29 May 2022
Kup BiH	First round	Second round	29 September 2021	27 October 2021

=== League table ===
Pos	Team	Pld	W	D	L	GF	GA	GD	Pts	Qualification or relegation
4	Sarajevo	33	13	7	13	37	33	+4	46	
5	Velež Mostar	33	13	8	12	42	37	+5	44 (Note: Velež were deducted 3 points due to their match against Borac in Round 10 being stopped because of Velež's fans invading the pitch.)	Qualification to Europa Conference League second qualifying round (Note: Velež qualified for the Europa Conference League second qualifying round by winning the 2021–22 Bosnian Cup.)
6	Željezničar	33	9	16	8	28	29	−1	43	
7	Široki Brijeg	33	8	15	10	31	35	−4	39	
8	Posušje	33	8	13	12	33	51	−18	37	

Source: Rezultati.com
Rules for classification: 1) Points; 2) Goal difference; 3) Goals scored; 4) Head-to-head points; 5) Head-to-head goal difference; 6) Head-to-head away goals (only if two teams); 7) Head-to-head goals scored; 8) Goal difference; 9) Play-off. (Criteria 2 and 3 are not used to decide champion, UEFA competition qualification, or relegation)

==== Results summary ====
Overall								Home						Away					
Pld	W	D	L	GF	GA	GD	Pts	W	D	L	GF	GA	GD	W	D	L	GF	GA	GD
33	9	16	8	28	29	−1	43	9	6	2	19	9	+10	0	10	6	9	20	−11

Source: Sportsport.ba

==== Results by round ====
Round	1	2	3	4	5	6	7	8	9	10	11	12	13	14	15	16	17	18	19	20	21	22	23	24	25	26	27	28	30	31	29^{1}	32	33
Ground	H	A	H	A	H	A	H	A	H	A	H	A	H	A	H	A	H	A	H	A	H	A	H	A	H	A	H	A	A	H	H	H	A
Result	D	L	W	L	W	D	D	D	D	L	W	D	W	L	L	D	W	D	W	L	W	D	W	L	W	D	L	D	D	D	D	D	D
Position	5	9	5	9	6	5	6	6	6	8	6	6	6	7	7	7	7	7	6	6	5	5	5	5	5	5	5	5	5	5	6	5	6
Points	1	1	4	4	7	8	9	10	11	11	14	15	18	18	18	19	22	23	26	26	29	30	33	33	36	37	37	38	39	40	41	42	43

Source: Competitions
A = Away; H = Home; W = Win; D = Draw; L = Loss

^{1} Match of Round 29 postponed because of Grbavica Stadium being one of four venues for the 2022 UEFA Women's Under-17 Championship.

==== Matches ====
17 July 2021 1	Željezničar	1–1	Borac Banja Luka	Sarajevo
21:00	Bojo (yellow card) 24', (goal) 43'; Mekić (yellow card) 45+1'; Juričić (yellow card) 53'; Kosorić (yellow card) 84'; Malić (yellow card) 87'	Report	Subić (yellow card) 27'; Kulašin 88'	Stadium: Grbavica Stadium; Attendance: 3,820; Referee: Antoni Bandić (Grude)

24 July 2021 2	Tuzla City	2–1	Željezničar	Tuzla
21:00	Šukilović (yellow card) 10'; Mešinović (yellow card) 55'; Čeliković (yellow card) 70'; Mehanović 74'; Nukić 80', (yellow card) 81'	Report	Mekić (yellow card) 35'; Juričić 71' (pen.); Blažević (yellow card) 75'	Stadium: Tušanj City Stadium; Attendance: 1,500; Referee: Frano Jelić (Široki Brijeg)

31 July 2021 3	Željezničar	1–0	Posušje	Sarajevo
19:00	Mujezinović 18'; Beća (yellow card) 39'	Report	Krišto (yellow card) 41'; Lučić (yellow card) 42'; Landeka (yellow card) 53'	Stadium: Grbavica Stadium; Attendance: 4,250; Referee: Mirza Kazlagić (Cazin)

7 August 2021 4	Zrinjski Mostar	3–0	Željezničar	Mostar
21:00	Savić 36'; Bilbija 41', 58'	Report		Stadium: Stadion pod Bijelim Brijegom; Attendance: 3,000; Referee: Sabrija Topalović (Zenica)

16 August 2021 5	Željezničar	2–0	Rudar Prijedor	Sarajevo
18:00	Mekić (yellow card) 29'; Vrhovac (yellow card) 39'; Bojo 55'; Juričić 90+2'	Report	Mandić (yellow card) 37'; Šćekić (yellow card) 79'	Stadium: Grbavica Stadium; Attendance: 3,000; Referee: Dražen Marić (Bijeljina)

22 August 2021 6	Radnik Bijeljina	0–0	Željezničar	Bijeljina
19:00	Batar (yellow card) 35'; Šarić (yellow card) 71'; Popara (yellow card) 80'	Report	Vrhovac (yellow card) 58'; Subašić (yellow card) 62'; Blažević (yellow card) 71'	Stadium: Gradski stadion Attendance: 1,500; Referee: Ermin Sivac (Zenica)

29 August 2021 7	Željezničar	1–1	Sloboda Tuzla	Sarajevo
21:00	Malić (yellow card) 54'; Zdunić 90', (yellow card) 90'	Report	Balić (yellow card) 34'; Devedžić (yellow card) 37'; Čivić (yellow card) 43'; Mehmedović (yellow card) 53'; Husejinović 79'; Osmić (yellow card) 90+2'; Bukvić (yellow card) 90+3'	Stadium: Grbavica Stadium; Attendance: 3,159; Referee: Miloš Gigović (Gradiška)

12 September 2021 8	Široki Brijeg	0–0	Željezničar	Široki Brijeg
21:00	Brekalo (yellow card) 35'; Paponja (yellow card) 50'; Vukoja (yellow card) 80'	Report		Stadium: Pecara Stadium; Attendance: 2,100; Referee: Miloš Gigović (Gradiška)

18 September 2021 9	Željezničar	0–0	Velež Mostar	Sarajevo
17:00	Crnčević (yellow card) 55'; Mujezinović (yellow card) 84'; Juričić (yellow card) 86'; Beća (yellow card) 90'	Report	Isić (yellow card) 39'; Pršeš (yellow card) 65'; Radović (yellow card) 70'; Vehabović (yellow card) 73'	Stadium: Grbavica Stadium; Attendance: 10,000; Referee: Frano Jelić (Široki Brijeg)

22 September 2021 10	Sarajevo	2–0	Željezničar	Sarajevo
20:30	Ahmetović 31'; Trako (yellow card) 39'; Bodul 58', (yellow card) 79'; Ramić (yellow card) 60'; Bagarić (yellow card) 80'; Varešanović (yellow card) 80'; Šabanović (yellow card) 90'	Report	Subašić (yellow card) 11'; Crnčević (yellow card) 23'; Mekić (yellow card) 56'; Blažević (yellow card) 80'	Stadium: Asim Ferhatović Hase Stadium; Attendance: 11,000; Referee: Irfan Peljto (Sarajevo)

26 September 2021 11	Željezničar	1–0	Leotar	Sarajevo
17:00	Mekić 44'; Vrhovac (yellow card) 48'; Juričić (yellow card) 69'; Beća (yellow card) 72'	Report	Mićunović (yellow card) 74'; Milić (yellow card) 87'; Sekulović (yellow card) 90'	Stadium: Grbavica Stadium; Attendance: 2,625; Referee: Luka Bilbija (Prijedor)

4 October 2021 12	Borac Banja Luka	1–1	Željezničar	Banja Luka
18:00	Vranješ 45'; Jovanović (yellow card) 47'; Ćorić (yellow card) 83'	Report	Bojo 33', (yellow card) 41'	Stadium: Banja Luka City Stadium; Attendance: 6,500; Referee: Frano Jelić (Široki Brijeg)

16 October 2021 13	Željezničar	2–1	Tuzla City	Sarajevo
17:00	Vrhovac 4', (yellow card) 37'; Zdunić 42'; Mekić (yellow card) 74'	Report	Mehanović (yellow card) 40'; Čeliković (yellow card) 58'; Džafić 65', (yellow card) 84'; Mišić (yellow card) 66'; Mehidić (yellow card) 73'	Stadium: Grbavica Stadium; Attendance: 2,377; Referee: Sabrija Topalović (Zenica)

24 October 2021 14	Posušje	2–0	Željezničar	Posušje
13:00	Lučić 21'; Milanović (yellow card) 30'; D. Begić 85'; T. Barišić (yellow card) 87'	Report	Malić (yellow card) 13'; Bojo (yellow card) 66'; Kosorić (yellow card) 69'	Stadium: Mokri Dolac Stadium; Attendance: 1,500; Referee: Dragan Petrović (Banja Luka)

1 November 2021 15	Željezničar	0–3	Zrinjski Mostar	Sarajevo
18:00	Crnčević (yellow card) 51'; Kosorić (yellow card) 58'; Vrhovac (yellow card) 80'	Report	Bašić 48'; Bilbija 57' (pen.), 89'; Tičinović (yellow card) 63'; Malekinušić (yellow card) 80'	Stadium: Grbavica Stadium; Attendance: 2,400; Referee: Ermin Sivac (Zenica)

7 November 2021 16	Rudar Prijedor	2–2	Željezničar	Prijedor
13:00	Santos (yellow card) 12'; Amoah 38', 73'; Dojčinović (yellow card) 78'	Report	Blažević (yellow card) 6'; Mekić 29'; Malić (yellow card) 41'; Subašić (yellow card) 59'; Beća (yellow card) 71'; Vištica (yellow card) 81'; Juričić (yellow card) 90'; Bekrić 90+5'	Stadium: Gradski stadion Attendance: 1,500; Referee: Antoni Bandić (Grude)

21 November 2021 17	Željezničar	2–0	Radnik Bijeljina	Sarajevo
15:00	Malić (yellow card) 7'; Juričić 50'; Gasal (yellow card) 52'; Mekić (yellow card) 68'; Crnčević (yellow card) 88'; Zdunić 90'	Report	Todorov (yellow card) 16'	Stadium: Grbavica Stadium; Attendance: 2,448; Referee: Zoran Grbić (Prijedor)

27 November 2021 18	Sloboda Tuzla	1–1	Željezničar	Tuzla
15:00	Osmić (yellow card) 31'; Dž. Beganović (yellow card) 38'; Ramić 42'; Jusić (yellow card) 90'	Report	Vrhovac 32', (yellow card) 36'; Blažević (yellow card) 45'; Hrelja (yellow card) 75'; Bender (yellow card) 90'	Stadium: Tušanj City Stadium; Attendance: 1,500; Referee: Antoni Bandić (Grude)

5 December 2021 19	Željezničar	1–0	Široki Brijeg	Sarajevo
15:00	Subašić 38'; Blažević (yellow card) 67'; Beća (yellow card) 90'	Report	Medić (yellow card) 21'; Vukoja (yellow card) 28'; Mujan (yellow card) 78'; Brekalo (yellow card) 90'	Stadium: Grbavica Stadium; Attendance: 2,165; Referee: Ermin Sivac (Zenica)

25 February 2022 20	Velež Mostar	2–0	Željezničar	Mostar
18:00	Haskić 4', 90'; Anđušić (yellow card) 19'; Radovac (yellow card) 47'; Ćosić (yellow card) 55'; Zajmović (yellow card) 71'; Pršeš (yellow card) 74'; Hasanović (yellow card) 85'; Ovčina (yellow card) 88'	Report	Mekić (yellow card) 30'; Cocalić (yellow card) 50'; Subašić (yellow card) 53' (yellow-red card) 73'; Bekrić (yellow card) 62'	Stadium: Stadion Rođeni; Attendance: 0 Referee: Dragan Petrović (Banja Luka)

5 March 2022 21	Željezničar	2–0	Sarajevo	Sarajevo
17:00	Bekrić (yellow card) 16'; Hodžić 31'; Malić (yellow card) 44'; Vučenović (yellow card) 75'; Hajdarević (yellow card) 88'; Zec 89', (yellow card) 89'	Report	Đokanović (yellow card) 39'; Dupovac (red card) 45'; Velkoski (yellow card) 76'	Stadium: Grbavica Stadium; Attendance: 8,000; Referee: Haris Kaljanac (Sarajevo)

13 March 2022 22	Leotar	0–0	Željezničar	Trebinje
13:00	Milić (yellow card) 41'; Stanojević (yellow card) 66'; Dujaković (yellow card) 75'; Puletić (yellow card) 90'	Report	Subašić (yellow card) 28'; Galić (yellow card) 73'	Stadium: Police Stadium; Attendance: 1,000; Referee: Mateo Musa (Čitluk)

20 March 2022 23	Željezničar	1–0	Velež Mostar	Sarajevo
19:00	Hajdarević (yellow card) 21'; Kosorić (yellow card) 37'; Hodžić (yellow card) 45'; Beća (yellow card) 85', (goal) 90'; Cocalić (yellow card) 90'	Report	Radovac (yellow card) 59'; Šikalo (yellow card) 89'	Stadium: Grbavica Stadium; Attendance: 4,500; Referee: Frano Jelić (Široki Brijeg)

3 April 2022 24	Posušje	3–2	Željezničar	Posušje
15:00	Kosorić 59'; Štilić 82'; Cocalić (yellow card) 86'	Report	Krišto 58'; Serdarušić 70', 83'; Lauš (yellow card) 75'; Maglica (yellow card) 90'	Stadium: Mokri Dolac Stadium; Attendance: 2,000; Referee: Miloš Gigović (Gradiška)

9 April 2022 25	Željezničar	3–0	Leotar	Sarajevo
15:00	Hodžić 5'; Subašić 23'; Mekić 28'	Report	Medan (yellow card) 6'; Milović (yellow card) 61'; Čubrilo (yellow card) 72'	Stadium: Grbavica Stadium; Attendance: 4,000; Referee: Luka Bilbija (Prijedor)

15 April 2022 26	Rudar Prijedor	0–0	Željezničar	Prijedor
16:00	Marić (yellow card) 72'; Amoah (yellow card) 73'	Report	Galić (yellow card) 7'; Blažević (yellow card) 42'; Resić (yellow card) 45'; Vucenovic (yellow card) 90+2'; Štilić (yellow card) 90+4'	Stadium: Gradski stadion Attendance: 1,200; Referee: Mateo Musa (Čitluk)

22 April 2022 27	Željezničar	1–2	Zrinjski Mostar	Sarajevo
18:00	Blažević (yellow card) 25'; Mekić (yellow card) 29'; Galić (yellow card) 71'; Subašić 74'; Vucenovic (yellow card) 90'	Report	Janković 2'; Čondrić (yellow card) 39'; Bilbija 64'; Zlomislić (yellow card) 86'	Stadium: Grbavica Stadium; Attendance: 2,748; Referee: Aleksandar Njegomirović (Prnjavor)

30 April 2022 28	Tuzla City	0–0	Željezničar	Tuzla
19:00	Nukić (yellow card) 80'	Report	Beća (yellow card) 65'	Stadium: Tušanj City Stadium; Attendance: 600; Referee: Irfan Peljto (Sarajevo)

10 May 2022 30	Sarajevo	1–1	Željezničar	Sarajevo
20:00	Suljić 10'; Ahmetović (yellow card) 66'	Report	Kosorić (yellow card) 28'; Galić (yellow card) 41'; Dupovac 66' (o.g.); Hajdarević (yellow card) 75'; Štilić (yellow card) 81'; Malić (yellow card) 90'	Stadium: Asim Ferhatović Hase Stadium; Attendance: 7,000; Referee: Admir Musić (Sarajevo)

16 May 2022 31	Željezničar	1–1	Radnik Bijeljina	Sarajevo
19:21	Subašić 11'	Report	Urošević (yellow card) 29'; Handžić 80'; Batar (red card) 90'	Stadium: Grbavica Stadium; Attendance: 7,000; Referee: Danijel Bojo (Kiseljak)

18 May 2022 29 (Note: Match of Round 29 postponed because of Grbavica Stadium being one of four venues for the 2022 UEFA Women's Under-17 Championship.)	Željezničar	0–0	Borac Banja Luka	Sarajevo
18:00	Štilić (yellow card) 52'; Blažević (yellow card) 56'	Report	Lukić (yellow card) 59'; Brkić (yellow card) 87'	Stadium: Grbavica Stadium; Attendance: 1,800; Referee: Mateo Musa (Čitluk)

22 May 2022 32	Željezničar	0–0	Široki Brijeg	Sarajevo
16:30	Mekić (yellow card) 56'; Bekrić (yellow card) 79'; Kočević (yellow card) 80'; Galić (yellow card) 90'	Report	Begić (yellow card) 62'; Kolenda (yellow card) 85'; Miškić (yellow card) 90'	Stadium: Grbavica Stadium; Attendance: 2,100; Referee: Luka Bilbija (Prijedor)

29 May 2022 33	Sloboda Tuzla	1–1	Željezničar	Tuzla
17:00	Ramić (yellow card) 8'; Jusić 41'	Report	Hodžić 5'; Galić (yellow card) 6'; Hajdarević (yellow card) 40'	Stadium: Tušanj City Stadium; Attendance: 1,100; Referee: Mirza Kazlagić (Cazin)

=== Kup BiH ===
==== Round of 32 ====
29 September 2021	Rudar Han Bila	0–6	Željezničar	Han Bila
16:00	Brkić (yellow card) 85'; Ribo (yellow card) 87'	Report	Zdunić 4'; Bojo 45'; Zec 55'; Mekić 77'; Osmančević 80' (o.g.); Jaganjac 82' (pen.)	Stadium: Stadion Han Bila; Attendance: 1,000; Referee: Ermin Sivac (Zenica)

==== Round of 16 ====
27 October 2021	Željezničar	2–4	Tuzla City	Sarajevo
16:30	Malić (yellow card) 3'; Mekić (yellow card) 8'; Bojo 19', 55'	Report	Džafić 5', (yellow card) 79'; Mišić 7', 51'; Mešinović (yellow card) 21'; Mehanović 34'; Morris (yellow card) 48'; Brajlović (yellow card) 89'	Stadium: Grbavica Stadium; Attendance: 1,000; Referee: Sabrija Topalović (Zenica)
