= Vučenović =

Vučenović (Serbian Cyrillic: Вученовић) is a Serbian surname. Notable people with the surname include:

- Aleksandar Vucenovic (born 1997), Austrian footballer
- Marija Vučenović (born 1993), Serbian javelin thrower
- Mario Vucenovic (born 1999), Austrian footballer

== See also ==
- Vacenovice, village in the Czech Republic
- Vučinović, surname
