= Ajdin Drina =

Bosnian footballer

Personal information
- Date of birth: 22 March 2004 (age 22)
- Place of birth: Sarajevo, Bosnia and Herzegovina
- Height: 1.78 m (5 ft 10 in)
- Position: Midfielder

Team information
- Current team: NK Vareš
- Number: 6

Youth career
- Radnik Hadžići
- –2021: Sarajevo
- 2021: Velež Mostar

Senior career*
Years	Team	Apps	(Gls)
2021–2023	Velež Mostar	2	(0)
2022–2023	→ Jedinstvo Bihać (loan)	26	(0)
2023	→ Radnik Hadžići (loan)	14	(0)
2024	Radnik Hadžići	12	(0)
2024–2025	Famos Vojkovići	39	(0)
2026–	NK Vareš		
- * Club domestic league appearances and goals as of 15 November 2025

Ajdin Drina (born 22 March 2004) is a Bosnian professional footballer who plays as a midfielder for Second League of FBiH club NK Vareš.

== Club career ==
=== Velež Mostar ===
On 29 November 2021, Drina signed a contract with Velež Mostar until 2026. In December 2021, he made his debut against hometown club Sarajevo.

==== Loan to Jedinstvo Bihać ====
In August 2022, Drina was sent on loan to Jedinstvo Bihać until the end of the calendar year.

== Career statistics ==
=== Club ===
As of match played 8 October 2023

Appearances and goals by club, season and competition
Club	Season	League			Cup		Europe		Total	
Club	Season	League	Apps	Goals	Apps	Goals	Apps	Goals	Apps	Goals
Velež Mostar	2021–22	Bosnian Premier League	2	0	0	0	–		2	0
Velež Mostar	2022–23	Bosnian Premier League	0	0	0	0	–		0	0
Velež Mostar	Total		2	0	0	0	–		2	0
Jedinstvo Bihać (loan)	2022–23	First League of FBiH	26	0	1	0	–		27	0
Radnik Hadžići (loan)	2023–24	First League of FBiH	8	0	0	0	–		8	0
Career total			36	0	1	0	–		37	0

== Honours ==
Velež Mostar

- Bosnian Cup: 2021–22
