= Vučinović =

Vučinović or Vucinovic (Serbian Cyrillic: Вучиновић) is a Serbo-Croatian surname. Notable people with the surname include:

- Marc Vucinovic (born 1988), German footballer
- Marija Vučinović (born 1958), Croatian politician

== See also ==
- Vacenovice, village in the Czech Republic
- Vučenović, surname
