= FK Radnik =

FK Radnik may refer to:

- FK Radnik Bijeljina, a football club based in Bijeljina, Bosnia and Herzegovina
- FK Radnik Hadžići, a football club based in Hadžići, Bosnia and Herzegovina
- FK Radnik Surdulica, a football club based in Surdulica, Serbia
