= Omar Beća =

Bosnian footballer

Personal information
- Date of birth: 1 January 2002 (age 24)
- Place of birth: Sarajevo, Bosnia and Herzegovina
- Height: 1.86 m (6 ft 1 in)
- Position: Defensive midfielder

Team information
- Current team: Radnik Hadžići
- Number: 36

Youth career
- 2017–2021: Željezničar

Senior career*
Years	Team	Apps	(Gls)
2020–2023	Željezničar	52	(1)
2024	Igman Konjic	3	(0)
2024–	Radnik Hadžići	6	(0)

International career^{‡}
2018–2019	Bosnia and Herzegovina U17	6	(1)
2022	Bosnia and Herzegovina U21	3	(0)
- * Club domestic league appearances and goals as of 28 September 2024 ‡ National team caps and goals as of 25 November 2022

Omar Beća (born 1 January 2002) is a Bosnian professional footballer who plays as a defensive midfielder for First League of the Federation of Bosnia and Herzegovina club Radnik Hadžići.

He started his professional career at Željezničar.

== Club career ==
=== Željezničar ===
Beća started playing football at hometown club Željezničar. On 27 November 2020, he made his professional debut against Mladost Doboj Kakanj at the age of 18. In July 2021, Beća signed his first professional contract with Željezničar. He scored his first professional goal for the club on 20 March 2022, in a league game against Velež Mostar.

On 27 June 2022, Beća extended his contract with Željezničar. In October 2023, after making only one appearance in the 2023–24 season, he terminated his contract with Željezničar and left the club.

=== Igman Konjic ===
On 13 January 2024, Beća signed a contract until summer 2024 with Igman Konjic.

== International career ==
Beća represented Bosnia and Herzegovina on various youth levels.

== Personal life ==
Beća's father Damir was also a professional footballer and is currently a football manager.

== Career statistics ==
=== Club ===
As of match played 28 September 2024

Appearances and goals by club, season and competition
Club	Season	League			Cup		Continental		Total	
Club	Season	Division	Apps	Goals	Apps	Goals	Apps	Goals	Apps	Goals
Željezničar	2020–21	Bosnian Premier League	4	0	0	0	—		4	0
Željezničar	2021–22	Bosnian Premier League	29	1	1	0	—		30	1
Željezničar	2022–23	Bosnian Premier League	18	0	2	1	—		20	1
Željezničar	2023–24	Bosnian Premier League	1	0	0	0	0	0	1	0
Željezničar	Total		52	1	3	1	0	0	55	2
Igman Konjic	2023–24	Bosnian Premier League	3	0	0	0	—		3	0
Radnik Hadžići	2024–25	First League of FBiH	6	0	0	0	—		6	0
Career total			61	1	3	1	0	0	64	2
