= Safiyanu =

Nigerian given name

- Gender: Male
- Language: Hausa

Origin
- Origin: Nigerian
- Meaning: Pure Gold; Diamond
- Region of origin: Northern, Nigeria

SafiyanuSafiyanu.ogg is a Nigerian male given name and surname predominantly used among Muslims, particularly within the Hausa community. Derived from Arabic, "Safiyan" which signifies "Pure Gold; Diamond". The female given name is Safiya.

== Notable individuals with the name ==
- Abubakar Safiyanu (born 2003), Nigerian professional footballer.
