= Nedim Mekić =

Bosnian footballer (born 1995)

Personal information
- Date of birth: 15 April 1995 (age 31)
- Place of birth: Sarajevo, Bosnia and Herzegovina
- Height: 1.71 m (5 ft 7 in)
- Position: Midfielder

Team information
- Current team: Prishtina e Re
- Number: 86

Youth career
- –2013: Olimpik
- 2013–2014: Željezničar

Senior career*
Years	Team	Apps	(Gls)
2014–2015	Željezničar	0	(0)
2015	→ Igman Konjic (loan)	2	(0)
2015	Travnik	13	(0)
2016	Zvijezda Gradačac	11	(2)
2016–2017	GOŠK Gabela	27	(4)
2017–2021	Radnik Bijeljina	88	(4)
2021–2024	Željezničar	85	(12)
2024	Lamia	9	(0)
2025	Sloga Meridian	25	(0)
2026–	Prishtina e Re	17	(5)
- * Club domestic league appearances and goals as of 22 June 2026

Nedim Mekić (born 15 April 1995) is a Bosnian professional footballer who plays for Kosovo Superleague club Prishtina e Re.

== Career statistics ==
=== Club ===
As of match played 26 May 2024

Appearances and goals by club, season and competition
Club	Season	League	League		Cup		Europe		Total	
Club	Season	League	Apps	Goals	Apps	Goals	Apps	Goals	Apps	Goals
Željezničar	2014–15	Bosnian Premier League	0	0	0	0	0	0	0	0
Igman Konjic (loan)	2014–15	First League of FBiH	2	0	—		—		2	0
Travnik	2015–16	Bosnian Premier League	13	0	2	0	—		15	0
Zvijezda Gradačac	2015–16	First League of FBiH	11	2	—		—		11	2
GOŠK Gabela	2016–17	First League of FBiH	27	4	1	0	—		28	4
Radnik Bijeljina	2017–18	Bosnian Premier League	15	0	0	0	—		15	0
Radnik Bijeljina	2018–19	Bosnian Premier League	28	1	2	0	—		30	1
Radnik Bijeljina	2019–20	Bosnian Premier League	20	1	1	0	2	1	23	2
Radnik Bijeljina	2020–21	Bosnian Premier League	25	2	1	0	—		26	2
Radnik Bijeljina	Total		88	4	4	0	2	1	94	5
Željezničar	2021–22	Bosnian Premier League	30	3	2	1	—		32	4
Željezničar	2022–23	Bosnian Premier League	27	3	6	0	—		33	3
Željezničar	2023–24	Bosnian Premier League	28	6	1	0	4	0	33	6
Željezničar	Total		85	12	9	1	4	0	98	13
Lamia	2024–25	Super League Greece	0	0	0	0	—		0	0
Career total			226	22	16	1	6	1	248	24

== Honours ==
GOŠK Gabela

- First League of FBiH: 2016–17
