= Ante Blažević =

Croatian footballer

Personal information
- Date of birth: 5 May 1996 (age 30)
- Place of birth: Split, Croatia
- Height: 1.77 m (5 ft 10 in)
- Position: Right-back

Team information
- Current team: Dubrava
- Number: 13

Youth career
- 2006–2007: Omladinac Vranjic
- 2007: Jadran Kaštel Sućurac
- 2007–2008: Omladinac Vranjic
- 2008–2014: Hajduk Split
- 2014–2016: Oostende

Senior career*
Years	Team	Apps	(Gls)
2014–2016	Oostende	6	(0)
2017	Junak Sinj	7	(0)
2017–2018	VfV 06 Hildesheim	17	(2)
2018–2019	Brežice 1919	12	(2)
2019–2020	Čelik Zenica	18	(0)
2020–2022	Željezničar	40	(0)
2022–2023	Levski Sofia	1	(0)
2023–2024	Croatia Zmijavci	6	(0)
2024–2025	Solin	16	(2)
2025–2026	Jedinstvo	34	(0)
2026–	Dubrava	2	(0)

International career
2010	Croatia U14	2	(1)
2010–2011	Croatia U15	6	(0)
2012–2013	Croatia U17	7	(0)
2013–2014	Croatia U18	3	(0)
2014	Croatia U19	1	(0)
- * Club domestic league appearances and goals as of 26 August 2026

Ante Blažević (born 5 May 1996) is a Croatian professional footballer who plays as a right-back for Dubrava.

== Early career ==
From Kaštel Sućurac, Blažević practiced athletics and football, having started his football career at Omladinac Vranjic and Jadran Kaštel Sućurac, before joining the HNK Hajduk Split academy. A forward, compared to Zlatko Vujović in his academy years, he became a youth national team player as well, but his stay proved to be rocky due to contract demands, with the player leaving the club for several months during his U17 years and training with GOŠK Kaštela, before returning to the team. Finally, in 2014, Blažević and his family refused to sign a professional contract with Hajduk, the negotiations having fallen through, the family stating that they felt Blažević wasn't being valued enough by the club, and, on the other side, the club not accepting terms such as one of the highest wages in the club, goal bonuses, guaranteed playing time, free-kick taking priority and others. Despite the urging of his agent Tonči Martić to stay at Hajduk, Blažević, subsequently admitting impatience, decided to accept an offer from the Belgian side K.V. Oostende.

== Levski Sofia ==
On 9 July 2022, he made his official debut for Levski Sofia in the 0:1 loss against CSKA 1948, which was the team's first league match for the 2022–23 season, but after that fell out of favor with coach Stanimir Stoilov and was removed from the first team.
