= Ermin Zec =

Bosnian footballer (born 1988)

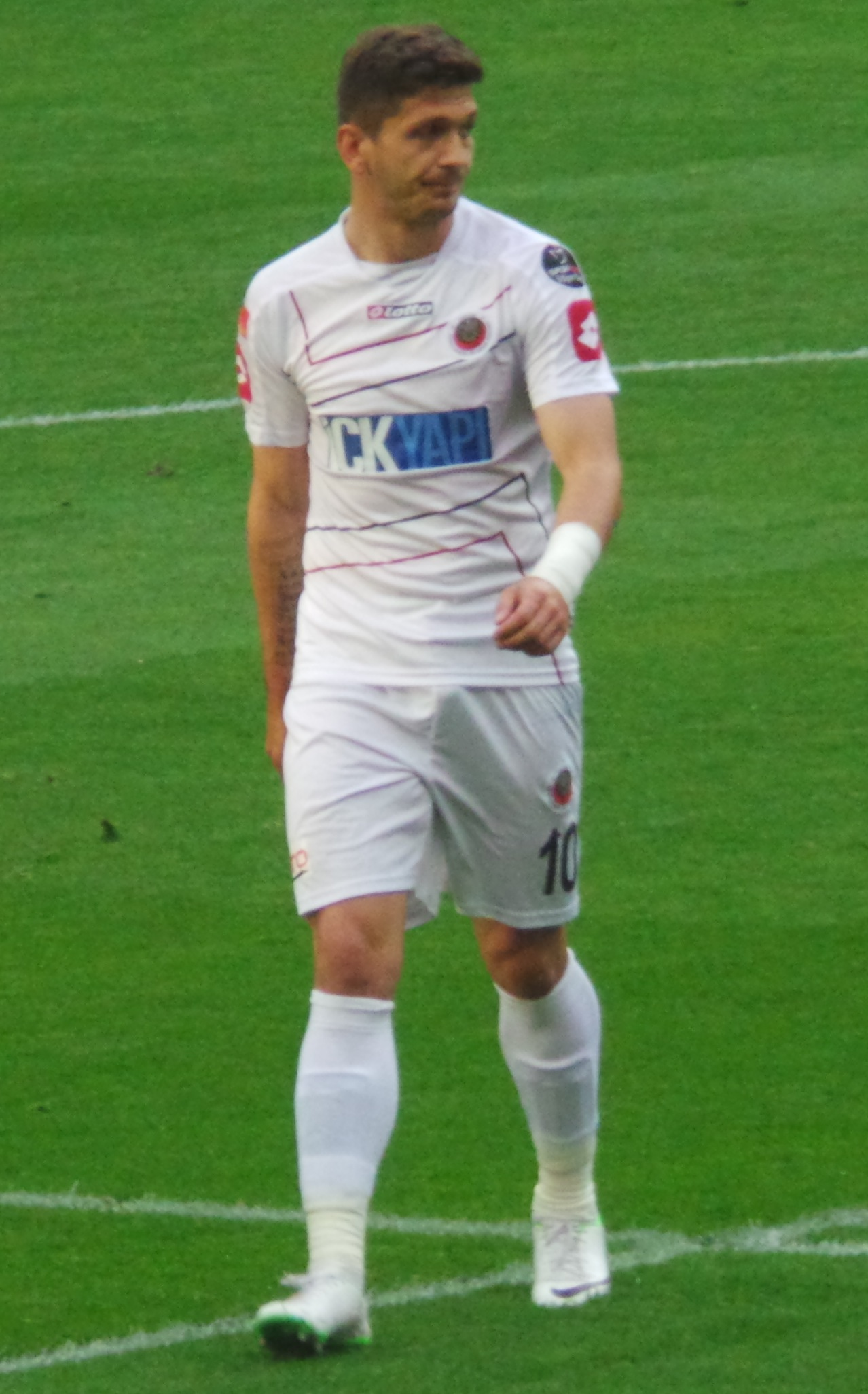
- Zec playing for Gençlerbirliği in 2014

Personal information
- Date of birth: 18 February 1988 (age 38)
- Place of birth: Bugojno, SFR Yugoslavia
- Height: 1.79 m (5 ft 10 in)
- Positions: Forward; winger

Youth career
- –2005: Iskra Bugojno

Senior career*
Years	Team	Apps	(Gls)
2005–2007	Iskra Bugojno	27	(11)
2007–2010	Šibenik	79	(32)
2010–2014	Gençlerbirliği	107	(19)
2014–2015	Rijeka	3	(1)
2015	Balıkesirspor	16	(7)
2015–2016	Gabala	23	(7)
2016–2017	Karabükspor	20	(6)
2017–2018	Gazişehir Gaziantep	13	(1)
2019–2022	Željezničar	54	(11)
Total		342	(95)

International career
2007–2009	Bosnia and Herzegovina U21	5	(0)
2008–2015	Bosnia and Herzegovina	10	(1)
- * Club domestic league appearances and goals

Ermin Zec (born 18 February 1988) is a Bosnian former professional footballer who played as a forward or as a winger.

== Club career ==
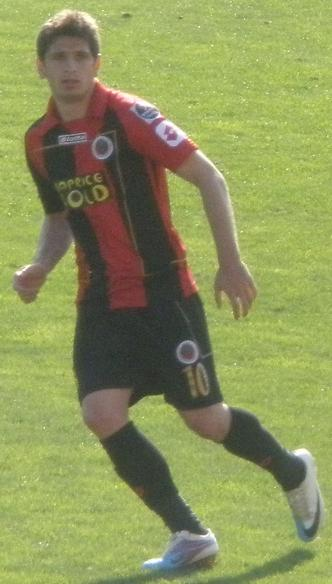
Zec playing for Gençlerbirliği in 2011

In 2007, Zec signed for Šibenik where he quickly established himself in the first team. He was voted best young Bosnian player of the year in 2009 by journalists. In a voting where all the captains in the Croatian League participated, Zec was voted the best player of the league in 2009.

In June 2010, he signed a four-year contract with Turkish club Gençlerbirliği.

After four years in Turkey, in September 2014, Zec returned to Croatia, signing with Rijeka.

At the beginning of 2015, Zec signed for Balıkesirspor on a three-and-a-half-year contract.

On 27 July 2015, je signed a one-year contract with Gabala in the Azerbaijan Premier League, with the option of an additional year. On 21 May, Gabala announced that Zec was leaving the club.

On 26 August 2016, Zec signed with Turkish Süper Lig club Karabükspor. During August 2017, he left Karabükspor.

On 25 August 2017, he signed with Gazişehir Gaziantep in the TFF First League. On 10 August 2018, it was announced that Zec left Gazişehir Gaziantep.

On 21 January 2019, he signed a contract with Bosnian Premier League club Željezničar. He scored his first goal for Željezničar on 3 March 2019, in a 2–1 home league win against Mladost Doboj Kakanj. Zec extended his contract with Željezničar for three more years on 18 June 2019. Following the end of the 2021–22 season, he left the club and retired from professional football.

== International career ==
Zec made his senior international debut on 19 November 2008, in a friendly match against Slovenia.

On 29 May 2010, he scored his first goal for the national team in a 4–2 loss against Sweden. Zec has earned a total of 10 caps, scoring 1 goal. His final international was a September 2015 European Championship qualification match against Andorra.

== Personal life ==
Zec's younger brother, Asim, is also a professional footballer who played with him at Željezničar.

== Career statistics ==
=== Club ===
Appearances and goals by club, season and competition
Club	Season	League			Cup		Continental		Total	
Club	Season	Division	Apps	Goals	Apps	Goals	Apps	Goals	Apps	Goals
Šibenik	2007–08	1. HNL	30	7	0	0	–		30	7
Šibenik	2008–09	1. HNL	27	14	0	0	–		27	14
Šibenik	2009–10	1. HNL	22	11	6	4	–		28	15
Šibenik	Total		79	32	6	4	–		85	36
Gençlerbirliği	2010–11	Süper Lig	24	4	8	4	–		32	8
Gençlerbirliği	2011–12	Süper Lig	27	3	1	0	–		28	3
Gençlerbirliği	2012–13	Süper Lig	29	6	1	0	–		30	6
Gençlerbirliği	2013–14	Süper Lig	27	6	1	0	–		28	6
Gençlerbirliği	Total		107	19	11	4	–		118	23
Rijeka	2014–15	1. HNL	3	1	2	2	–		5	3
Balıkesirspor	2014–15	Süper Lig	16	7	0	0	–		16	7
Gabala	2015–16	Azerbaijan Premier League	23	7	4	3	9	0	36	10
Karabükspor	2016–17	Süper Lig	20	6	4	3	–		24	9
Gazişehir Gaziantep	2017–18	TFF First League	13	1	1	0	–		14	1
Željezničar	2018–19	Bosnian Premier League	6	4	–		–		6	4
Željezničar	2019–20	Bosnian Premier League	11	1	0	0	–		11	1
Željezničar	2020–21	Bosnian Premier League	18	5	1	0	0	0	19	5
Željezničar	2021–22	Bosnian Premier League	19	1	2	1	–		21	2
Željezničar	Total		54	11	3	1	0	0	57	12
Career total			315	84	31	17	9	0	355	101

=== International ===
Appearances and goals by national team and year
National team	Year	Apps	Goals
Bosnia and Herzegovina
Bosnia and Herzegovina	2008	1	0
Bosnia and Herzegovina	2009	0	0
Bosnia and Herzegovina	2010	6	1
Bosnia and Herzegovina	2011	2	0
Bosnia and Herzegovina	2012	0	0
Bosnia and Herzegovina	2013	0	0
Bosnia and Herzegovina	2014	0	0
Bosnia and Herzegovina	2015	1	0
Total		10	1

=== International goals ===
Scores and results list Bosnia and Herzegovina's goal tally first.

Goal	Date	Venue	Opponent	Score	Result	Competition
1.	29 May 2010	Råsunda, Solna, Sweden	Sweden	1–1	2–4	Friendly

== Honours ==
Rijeka

- Croatian Super Cup: 2014

Individual

- 1. HNL Player of the Season: 2008–09
