= Abdulah Oruč =

Bosnian footballer and manager

Personal information
- Date of birth: 9 August 1955 (age 71)
- Place of birth: Sarajevo, FPR Yugoslavia
- Position: Midfielder

Youth career
- 1962–1974: Sarajevo

Senior career*
Years	Team	Apps	(Gls)
1974–1976	Sarajevo	11	(0)
1976–1978	Napredak Kruševac	27	(2)
1978–1982	Bosna Visoko	43	(1)
1982–1985	Rudar Velenje	39	(3)
1985–1987	Radnik Hadžići	13	(0)
Total		133	(6)

Managerial career
- 1996–1999: Radnik Hadžići
- 2003–2008: Sarajevo (assistant)
- 2012–2013: Sarajevo (assistant)
- 2015–2018: Sarajevo (youth)
- 2018–2022: Sarajevo (assistant)
- * Club domestic league appearances and goals

Abdulah Oruč (born 9 August 1955) is a Bosnian professional football manager and former player who is currently working as an assistant manager at Bosnian Premier League club Sarajevo.

Oruč started his career with Sarajevo, going on to play for numerous other clubs in the Yugoslav league system. So far, since 2003, he has worked at Sarajevo almost every year, with a break from 2008 to 2012.

== Honours ==
=== Player ===
Napredak Kruševac

- Yugoslav Second League: 1977–78 (East)
