= Damir Beća =

Bosnian footballer and manager

Personal information
- Date of birth: 13 February 1969 (age 57)
- Place of birth: Sarajevo, SFR Yugoslavia

Senior career*
Years	Team	Apps	(Gls)
- Radnik Hadžići

Managerial career
- SAŠK Napredak
- Turbina Jablanica
- 2015–2016: Goražde
- 2017: Čapljina
- 2018–2019: Radnik Hadžići
- 2019–2020: Metalleghe-BSI
- 2020: Jedinstvo Bihać
- * Club domestic league appearances and goals

Damir Beća (born 13 February 1969) is a Bosnian professional football manager and former player. He was most recently the manager of First League of FBiH club Jedinstvo Bihać.

== Personal life ==
Beća's son Omar is also a professional footballer.

== Managerial statistics ==
As of 31 October 2020

Managerial record by team and tenure
Team	From	To	Record				
Team	From	To	G	W	D	L	Win %
Goražde	July 2015	April 2016	21	9	1	11	42.86
Čapljina	March 2017	August 2017	18	10	3	5	55.56
Radnik Hadžići	June 2018	September 2019	34	22	4	8	64.71
Metalleghe-BSI	September 2019	June 2020	10	4	5	1	40.00
Jedinstvo Bihać	September 2020	October 2020	7	3	1	3	42.86
Total			90	48	14	28	53.33

== Honours ==
=== Manager ===
Radnik Hadžići

- Second League of FBiH: 2018–19 (Center)
