= Sedad Subašić =

Bosnian footballer

Personal information
- Date of birth: 16 February 2001 (age 25)
- Place of birth: Zenica, Bosnia and Herzegovina
- Position: Midfielder

Team information
- Current team: Rudar Kakanj

Youth career
- 2007–2017: Rudar Kakanj
- 2019–2020: Željezničar

Senior career*
Years	Team	Apps	(Gls)
2017–2019	Rudar Kakanj	27	(5)
2019–2022	Željezničar	59	(4)
2023	Tuzla City	12	(0)
2023	Zvijezda 09	6	(1)
2024	Stupčanica Olovo	9	(1)
2024–2025	Radnik Bijeljina	12	(0)
2025	Tuzla City	10	(2)
2025–	Rudar Kakanj	0	(0)

International career
2019	Bosnia and Herzegovina U19	4	(0)
- * Club domestic league appearances and goals as of 24 August 2024

Sedad Subašić (born 16 February 2001) is a Bosnian professional footballer who plays as a midfielder for First League of the Federation of Bosnia and Herzegovina club Rudar Kakanj.

Subašić started his career at Rudar Kakanj, before joining Bosnian Premier League side Željezničar in 2019. He left Željezničar in 2022.

== Club career ==
=== Early career ===
Born in Zenica, Bosnia and Herzegovina, Subašić started playing football in 2007 at Rudar Kakanj, joining the club's first team in 2017. He would then move on to join Bosnian powerhouse Željezničar on 8 July 2019, signing a five-year contract and playing for both the youth and first team of the club. He made his debut for Željezničar on 9 November 2019, in a league win against Sloboda Tuzla. Subašić scored his first goal for Željezničar in a league game against Široki Brijeg on 5 December 2021. He left Željezničar in December 2022.

== International career ==
Subašić represented the Bosnia and Herzegovina U19 national team, getting called up to the team in 2019. He played his first game against Albania on 7 September 2019.

== Career statistics ==
=== Club ===
As of match played 19 November 2022.

Appearances and goals by club, season and competition
Club	Season	League			Cup		Continental		Total	
Club	Season	Division	Apps	Goals	Apps	Goals	Apps	Goals	Apps	Goals
Rudar Kakanj	2017–18	First League of FBiH	1	0	—		—		1	0
Rudar Kakanj	2018–19	First League of FBiH	26	5	2	0	—		28	5
Rudar Kakanj	Total		27	5	2	0	—		29	5
Željezničar	2019–20	Bosnian Premier League	3	0	1	0	—		4	0
Željezničar	2020–21	Bosnian Premier League	17	0	2	0	0	0	19	0
Željezničar	2021–22	Bosnian Premier League	29	4	1	0	—		30	4
Željezničar	2022–23	Bosnian Premier League	10	0	0	0	—		10	0
Željezničar	Total		59	4	4	0	0	0	63	4
Career total			86	9	6	0	0	0	92	9
