= Abubakar Safiyanu =

Nigerian footballer (born 2003)

Personal information
- Date of birth: 6 August 2003 (age 23)
- Place of birth: Jos, Nigeria
- Height: 1.88 m (6 ft 2 in)
- Position: Forward

Team information
- Current team: TOŠK Tešanj
- Number: 9

Youth career
- –2022: Gaziantep

Senior career*
Years	Team	Apps	(Gls)
2022–2023	Radnik Hadžići	18	(1)
2023–	TOŠK Tešanj	3	(0)
- * Club domestic league appearances and goals as of 27 August 2023

Abubakar Safiyanu (born 6 August 2003) is a Nigerian professional footballer who plays as a forward for First League of FBiH club TOŠK Tešanj.

== Club career ==
=== Radnik Hadžići ===
In September 2022, Safiyanu signed a contract with Bosnian club Radnik Hadžići. He made his debut on October 1 in a league match against Budućnost Banovići. Safiyanu left the club at the end of the season.

=== TOŠK Tešanj ===
In July 2023, Safiyanu signed a contract with Bosnian club TOŠK Tešanj. In October 2023, Safiyanu's residence visa expired and the police told him that he would be arrested for that. However, he managed to avoid arrest thanks to the club and teammates who raised money for him to return to Nigeria.

== Career statistics ==
=== Club ===
As of match played 27 August 2023

Appearances and goals by club, season and competition
Club	Season	League			National cup		Europe		Total	
Club	Season	League	Apps	Goals	Apps	Goals	Apps	Goals	Apps	Goals
Radnik Hadžići	2022–23	First League of FBiH	18	1	0	0	—		18	1
TOŠK Tešanj	2023–24	First League of FBiH	3	0	0	0	—		3	0
Career total			21	1	0	0	0	0	21	1
