= Ognjen Stjepanović =

Bosnian professional footballer

Personal information
- Date of birth: 9 August 1998 (age 28)
- Place of birth: Zvornik, Bosnia and Herzegovina
- Height: 1.80 m (5 ft 11 in)
- Position: Left winger

Youth career
- –2016: Drina Zvornik

Senior career*
Years	Team	Apps	(Gls)
2016	Drina Zvornik	3	(0)
2016–2017	Brodarac	19	(7)
2017–2019	Drina Zvornik	42	(5)
2019–2020	Olimpik	16	(7)
2020	Sloboda Tuzla	0	(0)
2020–2021	Zvijezda 09	28	(14)
2021–2022	Željezničar	0	(0)
- * Club domestic league appearances and goals as of 29 May 2021

Ognjen Stjepanović (born 9 August 1998) is a Bosnian professional footballer who plays as a left winger.

== Career ==
In July 2020, Stjepanović moved from Olimpik to Sloboda Tuzla in the Bosnian Premier League, only to leave them after one month already and not playing a single game. After leaving Sloboda, he joined First League of RS club Zvijezda 09. Stjepanović finished the 2020–21 season with Zvijezda 09 as the league's joint top goalscorer with 14 goals.

On 26 July 2021, he returned to the Bosnian Premier League, signing with Željezničar. Without a single official appearance for the club, Stjepanović left Željezničar in January 2022.

== Honours ==
Olimpik

- First League of FBiH: 2019–20

=== Individual ===
Performance

- First League of RS Top Goalscorer: 2020–21 (14 goals)
