= Armin Ćerimagić =

Bosnian footballer

Personal information
- Date of birth: 14 January 1994 (age 32)
- Place of birth: Sarajevo, Bosnia and Herzegovina
- Height: 1.80 m (5 ft 11 in)
- Position: Left winger

Youth career
- Bubamara
- –2010: Željezničar

Senior career*
Years	Team	Apps	(Gls)
2011–2014	Gent	0	(0)
2013	→ Eendracht Aalst (loan)	21	(1)
2014–2017	Górnik Zabrze	31	(1)
2014–2016	Górnik Zabrze II	24	(7)
2017–2018	GKS Katowice	24	(2)
2018–2019	Mura	17	(1)
2020	Triglav Kranj	15	(2)
2020–2021	Mladost Doboj Kakanj	14	(0)
2022	Željezničar	2	(0)
Total		148	(14)

International career
2009	Bosnia and Herzegovina U17	3	(0)
2012–2013	Bosnia and Herzegovina U19	6	(4)
2012–2016	Bosnia and Herzegovina U21	8	(1)
- * Club domestic league appearances and goals

Armin Ćerimagić (born 14 January 1994) is a Bosnian former professional footballer who played as a left winger.
