= Novotel Sarajevo Bristol =

Hotel in Sarajevo, Bosnia and Herzegovina

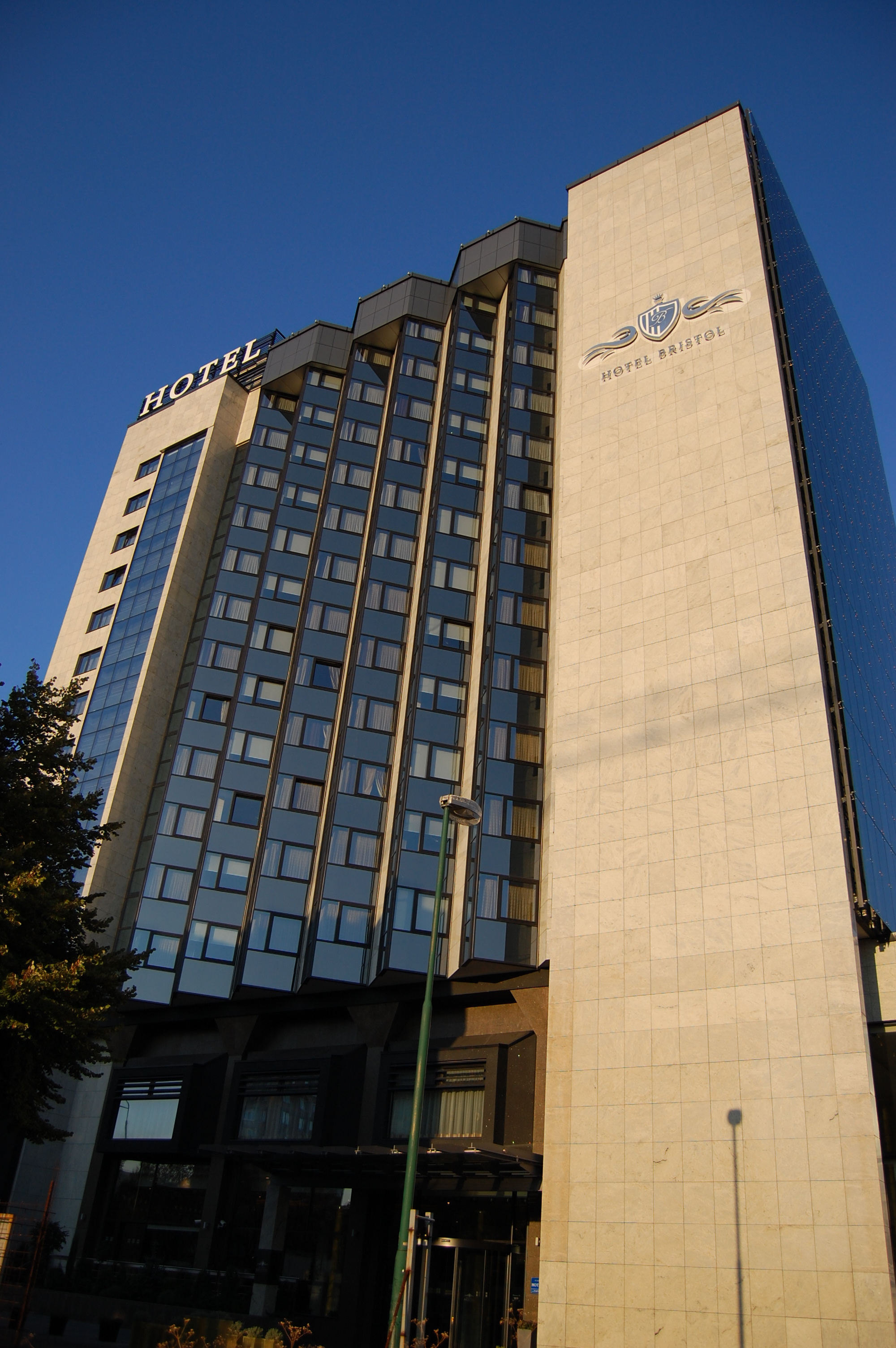

- Location within Bosnia and Herzegovina
- Former names: Hotel Bristol
- Hotel chain: Novotel

General information
- Architectural style: Streamline Moderne
- Location: Sarajevo, Bosnia and Herzegovina, Fra Filipa Lastrića 2, Sarajevo, Bosnia and Herzegovina
- Coordinates: 43.852859°N 18.389714°E
- Completed: 1973 hotel existed since 1920s in older building on nearby location across the Old Railway Station
- Opening: 2011
- Relocated: 1973 from an old building across the Old Railway Station to its present location
- Renovated: 2010–2011
- Operator: Accor

Technical details
- Floor count: 13

Other information
- Number of rooms: 186
- Number of suites: 2
- Number of restaurants: 1
- Number of bars: 2
- Parking: Own ground parking lot

Website
- Novotel Sarajevo Bristol

Novotel Sarajevo Bristol (formerly Hotel Bristol) is a mid-scale 4-star hotel that has operated under the Accor group's Novotel brand since re-opening in 2011. The hotel is located at Fra Filipa Lastrića 2, Sarajevo, Bosnia and Herzegovina.

== Location ==
The hotel building is located in the suburb of Pofalići, on the right bank of the Miljacka river, across from the neighbouring suburb of Grbavica and Grbavica Stadium. It is situated near Vilsonovo Šetalište (transl. Wilson's Lane) and features river and city views.

== History ==
Built in 1973, the hotel was originally named Hotel Bristol, having replaced an old hotel of the same name nearby. During the Siege of Sarajevo the building was bombarded by Serbian forces from across the river Miljacka. The hotel was subsequently restored and privatised in 2010.

== Restaurants and bars ==
Dining options include a European restaurant, an international restaurant and a brasserie serving international cuisine. The Café Bristol serves pastries, cakes and a wide selection of hot and cold beverages. There are 2 cafe-bars, one of which has a seated terrace.

== Facilities ==
The suites have living rooms and Jacuzzis. The fitness and spa area includes a sauna, an indoor swimming pool, massage tables and exercise bikes. A prayer room is available as are 4 meeting rooms.

== Awards and recognition ==
Novotel Sarajevo Bristol is the recipient of several World Travel Awards, namely "Bosnia and Herzegovina's Leading Hotel" for 2012, 2013, 2014 and 2018.
