= Aleksa Urošević =

Serbian association football player

Personal information
- Date of birth: 9 May 2000 (age 26)
- Place of birth: Čačak, FR Yugoslavia
- Height: 1.78 m (5 ft 10 in)
- Position: Full-back

College career
Years	Team	Apps	(Gls)
2022–2024	William Carey Crusaders	4	(0)

Senior career*
Years	Team	Apps	(Gls)
2018–2019	Borac Čačak	14	(0)
2019–2022	Spartak Subotica	8	(0)
2021	→ Borac Čačak (loan)	10	(0)
2021–2022	→ Radnik Bijeljina (loan)	24	(0)
- * Club domestic league appearances and goals as of 29 May 2024

Aleksa Urošević (Serbian Cyrillic: Алекса Урошевић; born 9 May 2000) is a Serbian footballer.

== Career statistics ==
As of 5 May 2019

Club	Season	League			Cup		Continental		Other		Total	
Club	Season	Division	Apps	Goals	Apps	Goals	Apps	Goals	Apps	Goals	Apps	Goals
Borac Čačak	2018–19	Serbian First League	14	0	1	0	—		—		15	0
Spartak Subotica	2019–20	Serbian SuperLiga	0	0	0	0	—		—		0	0
Career total			14	0	1	0	—		—		15	0
