= Mario Vucenovic =

Austrian association football player (1999-)

Personal information
- Date of birth: 6 October 1999 (age 27)
- Place of birth: Sankt Pölten, Austria
- Height: 1.72 m (5 ft 8 in)
- Position: Left winger

Team information
- Current team: Schwarz-Weiß Bregenz
- Number: 11

Youth career
- 2005–2012: ASK Wilhelmsburg
- 2012–2018: St. Pölten

Senior career*
Years	Team	Apps	(Gls)
2017–2018	St. Pölten II	12	(0)
2018–2019	Horn	7	(0)
2019	Amstetten	2	(0)
2020–2022	St. Pölten II	10	(5)
2021–2022	St. Pölten	6	(0)
2022–2024	Wiener SC	50	(16)
2024	SV Lafnitz	10	(0)
2024–	Schwarz-Weiß Bregenz	27	(7)
- * Club domestic league appearances and goals as of 22:13, 31 May 2025 (UTC)

Mario Vucenovic (born 6 October 1999) is an Austrian footballer who plays as a left winger for Schwarz-Weiß Bregenz in the 2. Liga.

== Career ==
=== Club career ===
Mario started his career at ASK Wilhelmsburg as a youth player, alongside his older brother, Aleksandar Vucenovic. The two brother's then together moved SKN St. Pölten in 2012. Mario played for the clubs academy until 2017, where he got his debut for the clubs reserve team in the Austrian Regionalliga in August 2017. He made 12 appearances in the Regionalliga during the season.

In the summer 2018, Vucenovic moved to Austrian Football Second League club SV Horn. With only 190 minutes of playing time spread over 8 matches at Horn, 19-year old Vucenovic moved to fellow league club SKU Amstetten on 28 August 2019, signing a deal until the end of the season. However, he was barely used here as well, playing only 53 minutes before leaving at the end of the year. Vucenovic then returned to SKN St. Pölten in January 2020, where he began playing for the clubs reserve team in the 1. Niederösterreichische Landesliga. In the summer 2021, Vucenovic was promoted to St. Pölten's first team squad in the 2. Liga.

In January 2022, Vucenovic moved to Austrian Regionalliga East club Wiener Sport-Club.

In January 2024, Vucenovic moved to SV Lafnitz, and six months later, in the summer 2024, he moved to fellow league club Schwarz-Weiß Bregenz.
