= Tonči Martić =

Croatian footballer (born 1972)

Personal information
- Date of birth: 23 November 1972 (age 53)
- Place of birth: Split, SFR Yugoslavia
- Height: 1.88 m (6 ft 2 in)
- Position: Midfielder

Senior career*
Years	Team	Apps	(Gls)
1989–1993	Hajduk Split		
1993–1994	Istra	8	(0)
1994–1995	Hajduk Split	2	(0)
1995–1996	Istra	41	(3)
1996–1997	Segesta	12	(3)
1997–2005	Mouscron	181	(20)
- * Club domestic league appearances and goals

Tonči Martić (born 23 November 1972 in Split) is a Croatian former footballer who played for Hajduk Split and Excelsior Mouscron.
