= Aleksandar Vucenovic =

Austrian footballer

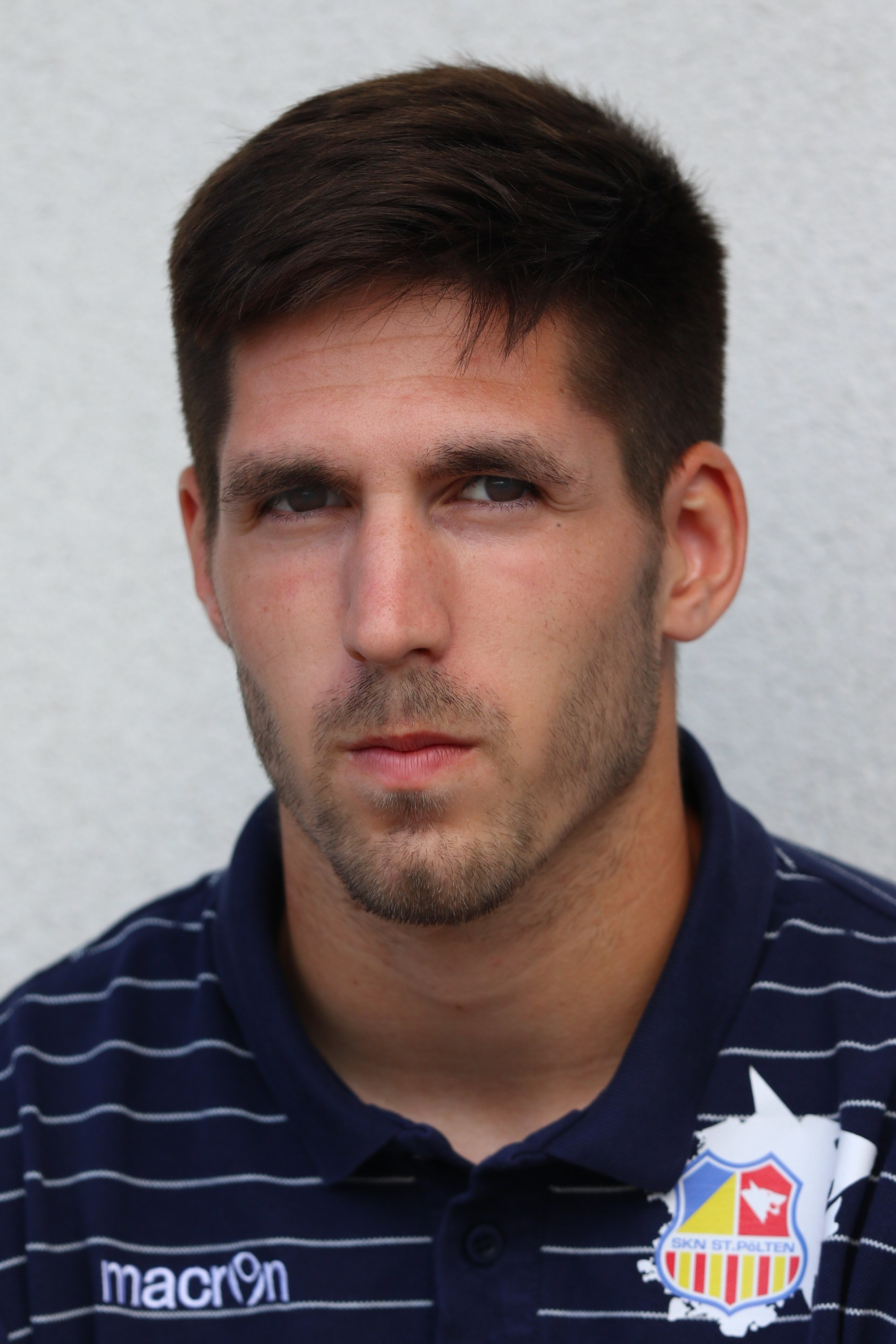
- Vucenovic with St. Pölten in 2018

Personal information
- Date of birth: 10 October 1997 (age 29)
- Place of birth: Prijedor, Bosnia and Herzegovina
- Height: 1.88 m (6 ft 2 in)
- Position: Forward

Team information
- Current team: FC Marchfeld Donauauen
- Number: 9

Youth career
- 2005–2011: Wilhelmsburg
- 2012–2015: St. Pölten

Senior career*
Years	Team	Apps	(Gls)
2015–2019	St. Pölten II	79	(13)
2017–2020	St. Pölten	16	(1)
2020	Sereď	6	(0)
2021	Haka	19	(5)
2022	Željezničar	6	(0)
2022–2023	Enosis Neon Paralimni	36	(9)
2023	UTA Arad	5	(0)
2024	Enosis Neon Paralimni	12	(4)
2024–2025	Radomlje	26	(1)
2026–	FC Marchfeld Donauauen	15	(5)
- * Club domestic league appearances and goals as of 25 June 2026

Aleksandar Vucenovic (Serbian: Александар Вученовић/Aleksandar Vučenović; born 10 October 1997) is an Austrian professional footballer who plays as a forward for FC Marchfeld Donauauen.

== Career ==
=== St. Pölten ===
Vucenovic made his Austrian Bundesliga debut for St. Pölten on 25 May 2017 in a game against Wolfsberger AC.

=== Sereď ===
Vucenovic's transfer to Sereď was announced on 20 February 2020. Terms of his agreement with the Slovak Super Liga side were not disclosed.

=== Željezničar ===
On 31 January 2022, Vucenovic signed a six-month contract with Bosnian Premier League club Željezničar, with an option to stay at the club until at least 2023. He made his debut for the club on 5 March 2022, coming on as a substitute in the second half of a 2–0 home win in the Sarajevo derby against Sarajevo. Vucenovic left Željezničar in June 2022, following his contract expiring.

== Personal life ==
Vucenovic's younger brother, Mario, is also a footballer.

== Career statistics ==
As of 16 January 2025

Appearances and goals by club, season and competition
Club	Season	League			Cup		Total	
Club	Season	Division	Apps	Goals	Apps	Goals	Apps	Goals
St. Pölten II	2015–16	Austrian Regionalliga	19	2	–		19	2
St. Pölten II	2016–17	Austrian Regionalliga	21	3	–		21	3
St. Pölten II	2017–18	Austrian Regionalliga	20	5	–		20	5
St. Pölten II	2018–19	Austrian Regionalliga	19	3	–		19	3
St. Pölten II	Total		79	13	0	0	79	13
St. Pölten	2016–17	Austrian Bundesliga	1	0	0	0	1	0
St. Pölten	2017–18	Austrian Bundesliga	7	1	0	0	7	1
St. Pölten	2018–19	Austrian Bundesliga	6	0	0	0	6	0
St. Pölten	2019–20	Austrian Bundesliga	2	0	2	1	4	1
St. Pölten	Total		16	1	2	1	18	2
Sereď	2019–20	Slovak Super Liga	6	0	1	0	7	0
Haka	2021	Veikkausliiga	19	5	0	0	19	5
Željezničar Sarajevo	2021–22	Bosnian Premier League	7	0	0	0	7	0
Enosis Neon Paralimni	2022–23	Cypriot First Division	36	9	2	1	38	10
UTA Arad	2023–24	Liga I	5	0	1	0	6	0
Enosis Neon Paralimni	2023–24	Cypriot Second Division	12	4	0	0	12	4
Radomlje	2024–25	Slovenian PrvaLiga	15	1	1	0	16	1
Career total			195	33	7	2	202	35
