= Vacenovice =

- Municipality
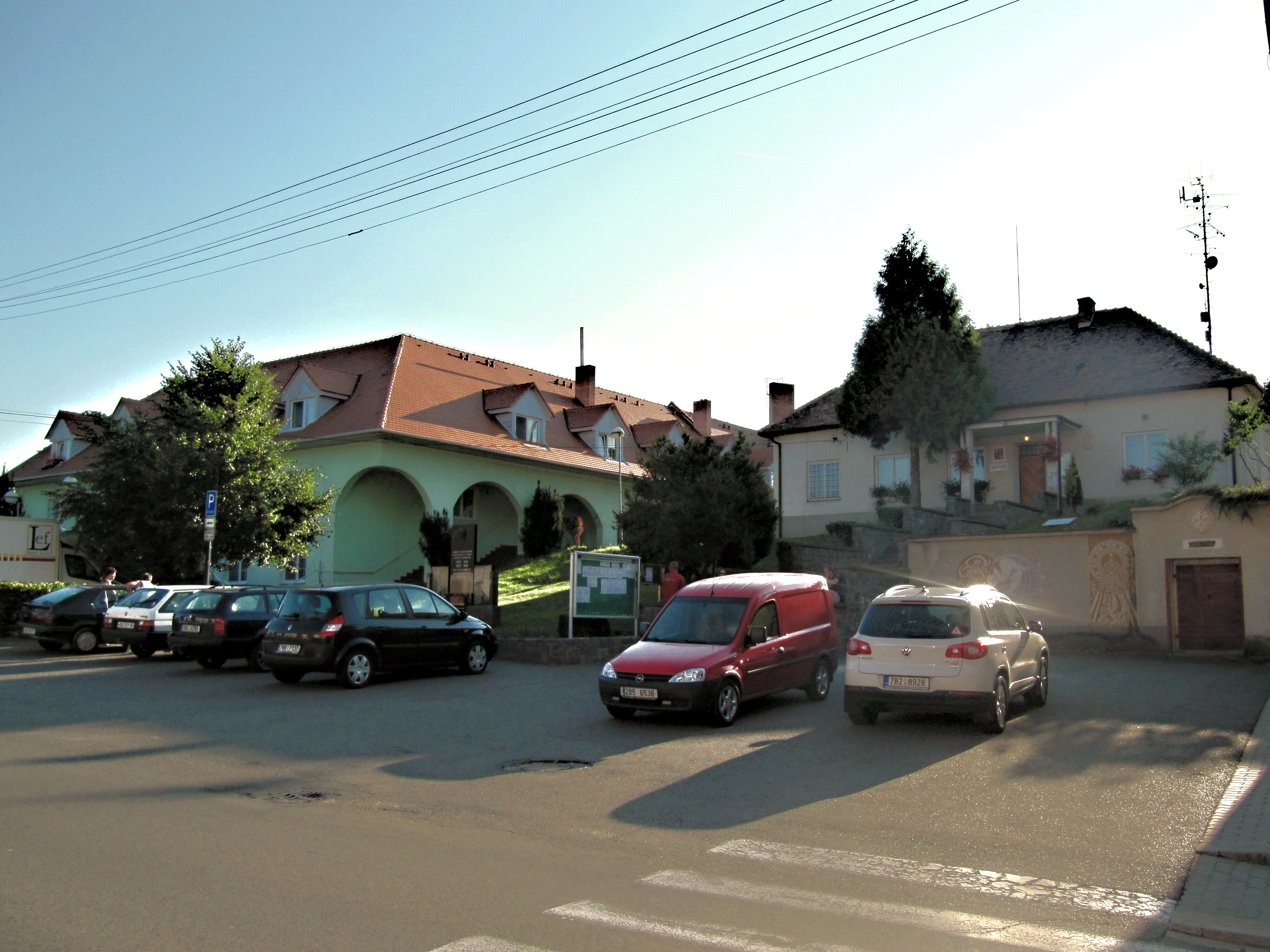
- Centre with the municipal office

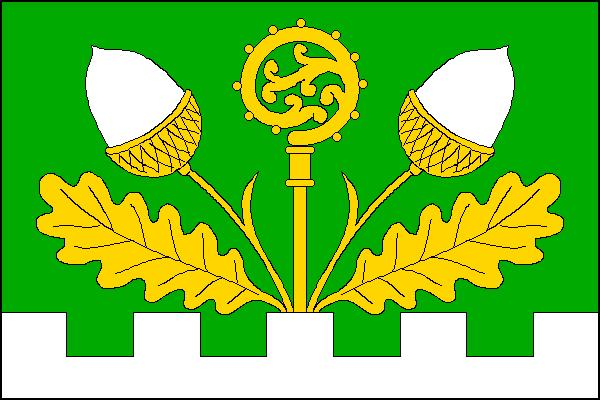
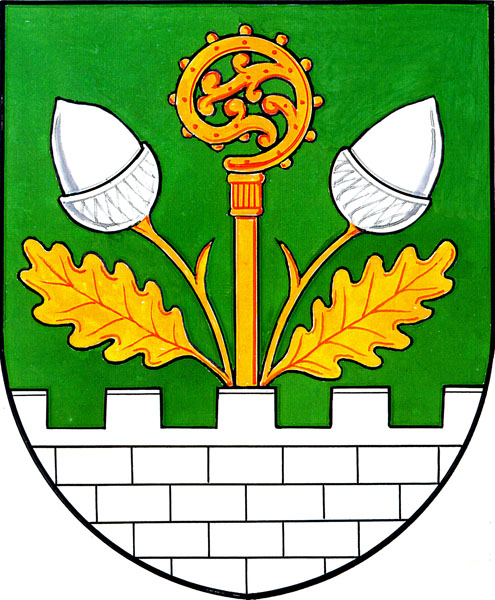
- Flag Coat of arms

- Location in the Czech Republic
- Coordinates: 48°56′42″N 17°10′27″E
- Country: Czech Republic
- Region: South Moravian
- District: Hodonín
- First mentioned: 1228

Area
  - Total: 14.65 km^{2} (5.66 sq mi)
- Elevation: 208 m (682 ft)

Population (2026-01-01)
  - Total: 2,156
  - Density: 147.2/km^{2} (381.2/sq mi)
- Time zone: UTC+1 (CET)
  - Summer (DST): UTC+2 (CEST)
- Postal code: 696 06
- Website: www.vacenovice.cz

Vacenovice is a municipality and village in Hodonín District in the South Moravian Region of the Czech Republic. It has about 2,200 inhabitants.

== Geography ==
Vacenovice is located about 10 kilometres (6 mi) north of Hodonín and 48 km (30 mi) southeast of Hodonín. It lies in a flat landscape in the Lower Morava Valley.

== History ==
The first written mention of Vacenovice is from 1228, when King Ottokar I donated the village to the monastery in Velehrad. From the beginning of the 16th century until the 20th century, the village belonged to the Milotice estate. From 1560 to 1622, the Anabaptist community lived in Vacenovice.

== Demographics ==
Historical population

Year	Pop.	±%
1869	796	—
1880	962	+20.9%
1890	1,016	+5.6%
1900	1,052	+3.5%
1910	1,213	+15.3%

Year	Pop.	±%
1921	1,244	+2.6%
1930	1,301	+4.6%
1950	1,472	+13.1%
1961	1,807	+22.8%
1970	1,959	+8.4%

Year	Pop.	±%
1980	2,058	+5.1%
1991	2,052	−0.3%
2001	2,083	+1.5%
2011	2,146	+3.0%
2021	2,087	−2.7%

Source: Censuses

== Transport ==
There are no railways or major roads passing through the municipality.

== Sights ==
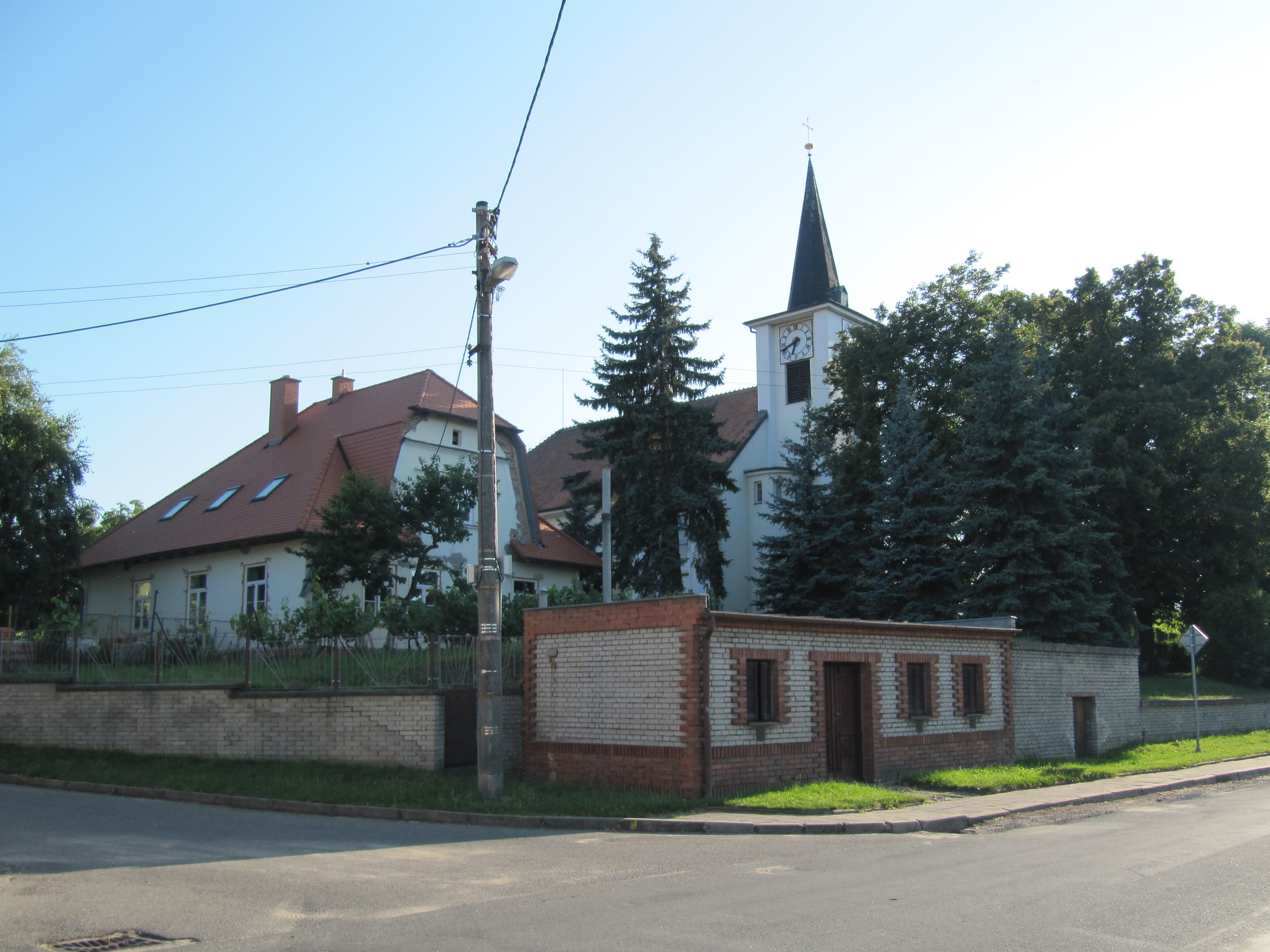
Church of the Sacred Heart

The only protected cultural monument in the municipality is a Baroque statue of Saint John of Nepomuk, dating from the second half of the 18th century.

The main landmark of Vacenovice is the Church of the Sacred Heart. It was built in 1927–1930. In the interior is a painting of the Sacred Heart by Jano Köhler.

== Notable people ==
- Dana Zátopková (1922–2020), javelin thrower, Olympic winner; lived here in childhood
