= FK Radnik Hadžići =

Bosnian association football club

Radnik Hadžići
- Full name: Fudbalski klub Radnik Hadžići
- Founded: 1948; 78 years ago
- Ground: Hadžići City Stadium
- Capacity: 500
- Manager: Elvis Sadiković
- League: First League of FBiH
- 2025–26: First League of FBiH, 8th of 14
Home colours	Away colours

Fudbalski Klub Radnik Hadžići is a professional association football club from the town of Hadžići that is situated in Bosnia and Herzegovina.

Currently, Radnik plays in the First League of the Federation of Bosnia and Herzegovina and plays its home matches on the Hadžići city stadium which has a capacity of 500 seats.

The club's golden years were in the mid-1990s, when it, under the guidance of club legend Sedik Fejzić, won the 1995–96 Second League of Bosnia and Herzegovina (South) and got promoted to the 1996–97 First League of Bosnia and Herzegovina season.

== History ==
=== Foundation and time in Yugoslavia ===
FK Radnik was founded in 1948 in the town of Hadžići. In the following years the club played variably until the season 1971–72, when led by manager Ivica Petković took the first place in the Sarajevo zone, gaining the right to play in the Yugoslav Second League (Group South). In the 1973–74 season, the club got relegated back to the republic league.

=== Golden years ===
At the beginning of the Bosnian War, the club stopped all of its activities. Finally in 1994, in the free part of Hadžići, in Pazarić, former club players started an initiative to restart the club.

In the 1995–96 season, the club finished in 1st place in the Second League of Bosnia and Herzegovina (Group South) and got promoted to the First League. In its only top tier season, the 1996–97 season, Radnik finished in last place, recording 1 win, 1 draw and 28 losses. In those two seasons, Radnik managed club legend Sedik Fejzić (1995–96 season) and former Radnik Hadžići player Abdulah Oruč (1996–97 season).

=== Present ===
Since the 1996–97 relegation, the club had its ups and downs, got relegated from the First League of FBiH in the early 2000s and had played in the Second League of FBiH (Group Center), though they were one of the best clubs in the league and on several occasions were close to promotion.

In the 2009–10 season, Radnik won the Second League of FBiH (Group Center) and got promoted back to the First League of FBiH, but after only one season of First League football since 2005, the club got relegated from the league in the 2010–11 season.

After nine years of their first promotion, in the 2018–19 season, under the guidance of local manager and also former club player Damir Beća, Radnik got once again promoted to the First League of FBiH two games before the end of the season, beating Pobjeda Tešanjka 6–0 at home on 22 May 2019, securing that spot.

== Honours ==
=== Domestic ===
==== League ====
- Second League of Bosnia and Herzegovina:
  - Winners (1): 1995–96 (south)
- Second League of the Federation of Bosnia and Herzegovina:
  - Winners (2): 2009–10 (center), 2018–19 (center)

== Notable and academy players ==
=== 1951–1992 ===
- (Socialist Federal Republic of Yugoslavia) Dževad Kulenović
- (Socialist Federal Republic of Yugoslavia) Marko Pejić
- (Socialist Federal Republic of Yugoslavia) Abdulah Oruč
- (Socialist Federal Republic of Yugoslavia) (Bosnia and Herzegovina) Sabit Sadiković
- (Socialist Federal Republic of Yugoslavia) (Bosnia and Herzegovina) Rešad Kulenović
- (Socialist Federal Republic of Yugoslavia) (Bosnia and Herzegovina) Sead Bećirević

=== 1992–1993 ===
- (Bosnia and Herzegovina) Damir Beća

=== 1993–present ===
- (Bosnia and Herzegovina) Benjamin Tatar
- (Bosnia and Herzegovina) Alen Bašić
- (Bosnia and Herzegovina) Dženan Osmanović
- (Bosnia and Herzegovina) Aldin Čajić
- (Bosnia and Herzegovina) Semir Kerla
- (Bosnia and Herzegovina) Adi Mehremić
- (Bosnia and Herzegovina) Sinan Ramović
- (Bosnia and Herzegovina) Muris Mešanović
- (Nigeria) Aliyu Abubakar
- (Bosnia and Herzegovina) Amar Memić

== Notable managers ==
- (Socialist Federal Republic of Yugoslavia) Ivica Petković
- (Socialist Federal Republic of Yugoslavia) Dževad Kulenović
- (Bosnia and Herzegovina) Sedik Fejzić
- (Bosnia and Herzegovina) Abdulah Oruč
- (Bosnia and Herzegovina) Damir Beća
