= 2020–21 FK Željezničar season =

Željezničar
2020–21 season
- Chairman: Admir Džubur (until 23 November); Samir Cerić (from 23 January)
- Manager: Amar Osim (until 11 April); Blaž Slišković (from 14 April)
- Stadium: Grbavica Stadium
- Premijer Liga BiH: 7th
- Kup BiH: Quarter-finals
- UEFA Europa League: First qualifying round
- Top goalscorer: League: Semir Štilić; Luka Juričić (8); All: Semir Štilić; Luka Juričić (9)

The 2020–21 season was Željezničar's 100th in existence and their 21st season in the Premier League BH. Besides competing in the domestic league, the team also competed in the National Cup and in the UEFA Europa League qualifiers as well.

The club finished in 7th place in the league, while it got knocked out from the cup in the quarter-finals.

== Season review ==
=== June ===
On 5 June, Željezničar announced the signing of 24-year-old Ante Blažević.

On 6 June, Željezničar and Frane Ikić negotiated a one-year contract extension lasting until June 2021, with an option for one more year.

On 12 June, Željezničar and Mont Inženjering signed a partnership agreement.

On 18 June, Željezničar announced the departure of Semir Dacić, Vernes Karavdić and Mirza Šubo.

On 20 June, Željezničar started with the pre-season for the upcoming season.

On 23 June, Željezničar announced the signing of 24-year-old Anel Hajrić.

On 26 June, Željezničar announced the signing of 23-year-old Luka Juričić.

On 27 June, Željezničar announced the signing of 35-year-old Samir Bekrić.

=== July ===
On 8 July, Željezničar announced the signing of 34-year-old Irfan Fejzić.

On 15 July, Željezničar announced the loan of 21-year-old Ivan Milićević from Lokomotiva for the upcoming 2020–21 season.

=== August ===
On 5 August, Željezničar extended their sponsorship agreement with Milkos and Brajlović.

On 15 August, Željezničar extended their sponsorship agreement with Sarajevo osiguranje.

On 20 August, Željezničar extended their sponsorship agreement with Adriatic osiguranje.

On 24 August, Željezničar announced six players tested positive for COVID-19, amid its pandemic in Bosnia and Herzegovina.

On 26 August, Željezničar announced four more players and a coach tested positive for COVID-19.

=== September ===
On 4 September, Željezničar announced the signing of 21-year-old Vedran Vrhovac.

On 4 September, Željezničar and Garden City Konjic signed a sponsorship agreement.

On 7 September, Željezničar announced that all the players, coaches and club staff tested negative for COVID-19.

On 24 September, Željezničar extended their sponsorship agreement with Hidroinvest.

=== October ===
On 5 October, Željezničar and Cracovia completed the transfer of Damir Sadiković.

On 7 October, Željezničar extended their sponsorship agreement with PAK Centar.

On 26 October, Željezničar extended their sponsorship agreement with Amko Komerc.

=== November ===
On 23 November, Željezničar's chairman of the board Admir Džubur died of complications caused by COVID-19.

=== December ===
On 17 December, Željezničar announced the departure of Anel Hajrić.

On 18 December, Željezničar announced the departure of Nermin Jamak.

On 22 December, Željezničar extended their sponsorship agreement with Sarajevski kiseljak.

=== January ===
On 14 January, Željezničar and Boluspor completed the transfer of Haris Hajdarević.

On 23 January, Željezničar announced that businessman Samir Cerić had become the new club chairman of the board.

On 26 January, Željezničar and Media Market signed a partnership agreement.

On 30 January, Željezničar announced the loan of 22-year-old Jasmin Čeliković from Rijeka for the remainder of the 2020–21 season.

=== February ===
On 3 February, Željezničar and Mustafa Mujezinović negotiated a one-year contract extension lasting until June 2022.

On 4 February, Željezničar extended their sponsorship agreement with ELPI Comerc and Eko sir Puđa.

On 16 February, Željezničar and Siniša Stevanović negotiated a one-and-a-half-year contract extension lasting until June 2022.

On 23 February, Željezničar announced the signing of 20-year-old Luka Malić.

On 24 February, Željezničar announced the signings of 25-year-old Josip Bender and 28-year-old Sinan Ramović

=== March ===
On 2 March, Željezničar announced the loan of 21-year-old Anel Šabanadžović from AEK Athens for the remainder of the 2020–21 season, and the signing of 19-year-old Damir Hrelja.

On 18 March, Željezničar extended their sponsorship agreement with Mont Inženjering.

On 29 March, Željezničar and Blocksport signed a partnership agreement.

=== April ===
On 11 April, Željezničar announced the departure of manager Amar Osim.

On 14 April, Željezničar announced Blaž Slišković as the club's new manager.

=== May ===
On 8 May, Željezničar and Ghanaian Premier League club Medeama signed an official club partnership.

== Squad information ==
=== Players ===
N	Pos.	Nat.	Name	Age	EU	Since	App	Goals	Ends	Transfer fee	Notes
1	GK	(Serbia)	Erić	31	Non-EU	2019	37	0	2021	Free	Second nationality: BiH
2	DF	(Serbia)	Stevanović	37	EU	2016	143	1	2022	Free	Second nationality: Croatia
4	MF	(Bosnia and Herzegovina)	Šabanadžović	27	Non-EU	2021	56	3	2021	Free	On loan from AEK Athens
5	DF	(Bosnia and Herzegovina)	Kosorić	39	Non-EU	2020	116	3	2022	Free	Second nationality: Serbia
6	DF	(Bosnia and Herzegovina)	Miletić	31	EU	2020	20	1	2022	Free	Second nationality: Croatia
7	MF	(Bosnia and Herzegovina)	Subašić	25	Non-EU	2019	23	0	2024	Free	
8	MF	(Bosnia and Herzegovina)	Mujezinović	33	EU	2019	63	5	2022	Free	Second nationality: Germany
9	FW	(Bosnia and Herzegovina)	Juričić	29	EU	2020	28	9	2022	Free	Second nationality: Croatia
10	FW	(Bosnia and Herzegovina)	Zec	38	Non-EU	2019	36	10	2022	Free	
12	GK	(Bosnia and Herzegovina)	Fejzić	40	Non-EU	2020	33	0	2021	Free	
13	GK	(Bosnia and Herzegovina)	Muftić	24	Non-EU	2020	2	0	2021	Youth system	
14	MF	(Bosnia and Herzegovina)	Štilić (C)	38	Non-EU	2019	108	37	2022	Free	Originally from youth system
15	DF	(Bosnia and Herzegovina)	Vrhovac	27	Non-EU	2020	12	1	2022	Free	
16	MF	(Bosnia and Herzegovina)	Alispahić	38	Non-EU	2019	51	4	2021	Free	
17	DF	(Bosnia and Herzegovina)	Milićević	28	EU	2020	23	2	2021	Free	On loan from Lokomotiva
20	MF	(Bosnia and Herzegovina)	Veselinović	33	Non-EU	2018	74	6	2022	Free	
21	DF	(Croatia)	Blažević	30	EU	2020	20	0	2022	Free	
22	MF	(Bosnia and Herzegovina)	Bojo	28	EU	2019	43	5	2021	€30,000	Second nationality: Croatia
23	DF	(Bosnia and Herzegovina)	Čeliković	27	EU	2021	14	0	2021	Free	On loan from Rijeka
24	FW	(Croatia)	Lendrić	35	EU	2020	82	39	2021	Free	Second nationality: BiH
25	DF	(Croatia)	Ikić	32	EU	2020	30	1	2022	Free	
27	MF	(Bosnia and Herzegovina)	Gasal	23	Non-EU	2020	8	1	2021	Youth system	
29	FW	(Bosnia and Herzegovina)	Nargalić	25	Non-EU	2021	1	0	–	Free	
31	FW	(Bosnia and Herzegovina)	Hrelja	24	Non-EU	2021	4	0	2023	Free	
33	DF	(Bosnia and Herzegovina)	Šehić	26	Non-EU	2018	27	0	2021	Youth system	
40	GK	(Croatia)	Bender	31	EU	2021	5	0	2022	Free	
90	MF	(Bosnia and Herzegovina)	Bekrić	41	Non-EU	2020	226	49	2021	Free	
99	MF	(Bosnia and Herzegovina)	Ramović	33	Non-EU	2021	68	8	2021	Free	
–	DF	(Bosnia and Herzegovina)	Malić	26	Non-EU	2021	0	0	2023	Free	On loan to Željezničar Banja Luka
–	MF	(Bosnia and Herzegovina)	Mehić	25	Non-EU	2019	2	0	2024	Free	On loan to Zvijezda Gradačac
–	MF	(Bosnia and Herzegovina)	Osmanović	26	Non-EU	2017	8	0	2022	Youth system	On loan to Igman Konjic
–	MF	(Bosnia and Herzegovina)	Mujić	25	Non-EU	2020	0	0	2023	Youth system	On loan to Goražde

- Source: fkzeljeznicar.ba

==== From Youth system ====
N	Pos.	Nat.	Name	Age	EU	Since	App	Goals	Ends	Transfer fee	Notes
26	MF	(Bosnia and Herzegovina)	Duraković	24	Non-EU	2020	3	1	–	Youth system	
28	DF	(Bosnia and Herzegovina)	Beća	24	Non-EU	2020	4	0	–	Youth system	
29	DF	(Bosnia and Herzegovina)	Drina	24	Non-EU	2020	1	0	–	Youth system	
92	GK	(Bosnia and Herzegovina)	Milićević	24	Non-EU	2020	0	0	–	Youth system	

- Source: fkzeljeznicar.ba

=== Disciplinary record ===
Includes all competitive matches and only players that got booked throughout the season. The list is sorted by shirt number, and then position.

N	P	Nat.	Name	League			Cup			Europe			Others			Total			Notes
N	P	Nat.	Name	Yellow card	Second yellow card	Red card	Yellow card	Second yellow card	Red card	Yellow card	Second yellow card	Red card	Yellow card	Second yellow card	Red card	Yellow card	Second yellow card	Red card	Notes
1	GK	(Serbia)	Erić	1												1			
2	DF	(Serbia)	Stevanović	10	1		1			1						12	1		
5	DF	(Bosnia and Herzegovina)	Kosorić	10						1						11			
6	DF	(Bosnia and Herzegovina)	Miletić	4												4			
7	MF	(Bosnia and Herzegovina)	Subašić	3												3			
8	MF	(Bosnia and Herzegovina)	Mujezinović	2												2			
9	FW	(Bosnia and Herzegovina)	Juričić	6						1						7			
10	FW	(Bosnia and Herzegovina)	Zec	1												1			
14	MF	(Bosnia and Herzegovina)	Štilić	3												3			
15	DF	(Bosnia and Herzegovina)	Vrhovac	1												1			
16	MF	(Bosnia and Herzegovina)	Alispahić	4						1						5			
17	DF	(Bosnia and Herzegovina)	Milićević	2	1											2	1		
20	MF	(Bosnia and Herzegovina)	Veselinović	2												2			
21	DF	(Croatia)	Blažević	4						1						5			
22	MF	(Bosnia and Herzegovina)	Bojo	3												3			
23	DF	(Bosnia and Herzegovina)	Čeliković	5												5			
24	FW	(Croatia)	Lendrić				1									1			
25	DF	(Croatia)	Ikić	7	1		1									8	1		
26	MF	(Bosnia and Herzegovina)	Duraković	1			1									2			
27	MF	(Bosnia and Herzegovina)	Gasal	1												1			
33	DF	(Bosnia and Herzegovina)	Šehić	6			1									7			
90	MF	(Bosnia and Herzegovina)	Bekrić	1												1			

Source: Competitive matches and fkzeljeznicar.ba
Ordered by (red card) , (second yellow card) and (yellow card)
(yellow card) = Number of bookings; (second yellow card) = Number of sending offs after a second yellow card; (red card) = Number of sending offs by a direct red card.

== Squad statistics ==
=== Goalscorers ===
No.	Pos.	Nation	Name	Premijer Liga BiH	Kup BiH	UEFA Europa League	Total
14	MF	(Bosnia and Herzegovina)	Štilić	8	1	0	9
9	FW	(Bosnia and Herzegovina)	Juričić	8	1	0	9
24	FW	(Croatia)	Lendrić	6	0	1	7
8	MF	(Bosnia and Herzegovina)	Mujezinović	5	0	0	5
10	FW	(Bosnia and Herzegovina)	Zec	5	0	0	5
90	MF	(Bosnia and Herzegovina)	Bekrić	4	1	0	5
22	MF	(Bosnia and Herzegovina)	Bojo	2	1	0	3
16	MF	(Bosnia and Herzegovina)	Alispahić	2	0	0	2
20	MF	(Bosnia and Herzegovina)	Veselinović	2	0	0	2
17	DF	(Bosnia and Herzegovina)	Milićević	2	0	0	2
25	DF	(Croatia)	Ikić	2	0	0	2
6	DF	(Bosnia and Herzegovina)	Miletić	1	0	0	1
2	DF	(Serbia)	Stevanović	1	0	0	1
26	MF	(Bosnia and Herzegovina)	Duraković	1	0	0	1
27	MF	(Bosnia and Herzegovina)	Gasal	1	0	0	1
15	DF	(Bosnia and Herzegovina)	Vrhovac	0	1	0	1
#	Own goals			0	1	0	1
TOTAL				50	6	1	57

=== Assists ===
No.	Pos.	Nation	Name	Premijer Liga BiH	Kup BiH	UEFA Europa League	Total
14	MF	(Bosnia and Herzegovina)	Štilić	7	1	1	9
90	MF	(Bosnia and Herzegovina)	Bekrić	4	1	0	5
16	MF	(Bosnia and Herzegovina)	Alispahić	3	0	0	3
24	FW	(Croatia)	Lendrić	3	0	0	3
22	MF	(Bosnia and Herzegovina)	Bojo	2	1	0	3
25	DF	(Croatia)	Ikić	2	0	0	2
21	DF	(Croatia)	Blažević	2	0	0	2
27	MF	(Bosnia and Herzegovina)	Gasal	2	0	0	2
9	FW	(Bosnia and Herzegovina)	Juričić	1	0	0	1
19	MF	(Bosnia and Herzegovina)	Sadiković	1	0	0	1
7	MF	(Bosnia and Herzegovina)	Subašić	1	0	0	1
5	DF	(Bosnia and Herzegovina)	Kosorić	1	0	0	1
20	MF	(Bosnia and Herzegovina)	Veselinović	1	0	0	1
10	FW	(Bosnia and Herzegovina)	Zec	1	0	0	1
17	DF	(Bosnia and Herzegovina)	Milićević	1	0	0	1
2	DF	(Serbia)	Stevanović	0	1	0	1
37	FW	(Bosnia and Herzegovina)	Hajrić	0	1	0	1
TOTAL				31	5	1	37

=== Clean sheets ===
No.	Nation	Name	Premijer Liga BiH	Kup BiH	UEFA Europa League	Total	Games played
1	(Serbia)	Erić	6	0	0	6	20
12	(Bosnia and Herzegovina)	Fejzić	4	1	0	5	10
40	(Croatia)	Bender	0	0	0	0	5
13	(Bosnia and Herzegovina)	Muftić	1	0	0	1	2
TOTAL			11	1	0	12	37

== Transfers ==
=== Players in ===
No.	Pos.	Nat.	Name	Age	EU	Moving from	Type	Transfer window	Ends	Transfer fee	Source
21	DF	(Croatia)	Ante Blažević	30	EU	Čelik Zenica	End of contract	Summer	2022	Free	fkzeljeznicar.ba
37	FW	(Bosnia and Herzegovina)	Anel Hajrić	30	EU	Lokeren (Belgium)	End of contract	Summer	2022	Free	fkzeljeznicar.ba
9	FW	(Bosnia and Herzegovina)	Luka Juričić	29	EU	Šibenik (Croatia)	End of contract	Summer	2022	Free	fkzeljeznicar.ba
90	MF	(Bosnia and Herzegovina)	Samir Bekrić	41	Non-EU	Sloboda Tuzla	End of contract	Summer	2021	Free	fkzeljeznicar.ba
12	GK	(Bosnia and Herzegovina)	Irfan Fejzić	40	Non-EU	Sloboda Tuzla	End of contract	Summer	2021	Free	fkzeljeznicar.ba
17	DF	(Bosnia and Herzegovina)	Ivan Milićević	28	EU	Lokomotiva (Croatia)	Loan	Summer	2021	Free	fkzeljeznicar.ba
15	DF	(Bosnia and Herzegovina)	Vedran Vrhovac	27	Non-EU	Čelik Zenica	End of contract	Summer	2022	Free	fkzeljeznicar.ba
11	MF	(Bosnia and Herzegovina)	Asim Zec	32	Non-EU	Zrinjski Mostar	End of contract	Summer	2021	Free	fkzeljeznicar.ba
23	DF	(Bosnia and Herzegovina)	Jasmin Čeliković	27	Non-EU	Rijeka (Croatia)	Loan	Winter	2021	Free	fkzeljeznicar.ba
29	FW	(Bosnia and Herzegovina)	Salko Nargalić	25	Non-EU	Sarajevo	End of contract	Winter	–	Free	
–	DF	(Bosnia and Herzegovina)	Luka Malić	26	Non-EU	Željezničar Banja Luka	End of contract	Winter	2023	Free	fkzeljeznicar.ba
–	GK	(Croatia)	Josip Bender	31	EU	Solin (Croatia)	End of contract	Winter	2022	Free	fkzeljeznicar.ba
99	MF	(Bosnia and Herzegovina)	Sinan Ramović	33	Non-EU	Stade Lausanne Ouchy (Switzerland)	End of contract	Winter	2021	Free	fkzeljeznicar.ba
4	MF	(Bosnia and Herzegovina)	Anel Šabanadžović	27	Non-EU	AEK Athens (Greece)	Loan	Winter	2021	Free	fkzeljeznicar.ba
31	MF	(Bosnia and Herzegovina)	Damir Hrelja	24	Non-EU	Goražde	End of contract	Winter	2023	Free	fkzeljeznicar.ba

Total expenditure: ▼€0

=== Players out ===
No.	Pos.	Nat.	Name	Age	EU	Moving to	Type	Transfer window	Transfer fee	Source
22	GK	(Bosnia and Herzegovina)	Vernes Karavdić	28	Non-EU	Free agent	Contract termination	Summer	Free	fkzeljeznicar.ba
26	MF	(Bosnia and Herzegovina)	Semir Dacić	27	Non-EU	Novi Pazar (Serbia)	Contract termination	Summer	Free	facebook.com/fknovipazar
30	FW	(Bosnia and Herzegovina)	Mirza Šubo	28	Non-EU	Rudar Kakanj	Contract termination	Summer	Free	facebook.com/fkrudarkakanj
39	MF	(Bosnia and Herzegovina)	Denis Žerić	28	Non-EU	Sloboda Tuzla	End of contract	Summer	Free	fksloboda.ba
3	DF	(Croatia)	Antonio Pavić	31	EU	Shkëndija (North Macedonia)	End of contract	Summer	Free	kfshkendija.com
18	FW	(Bosnia and Herzegovina)	Dženan Zajmović	31	EU	Politehnica Iași (Romania)	End of contract	Summer	Free	politehnicaiasi.ro
9	MF	(Bosnia and Herzegovina)	Sinan Ramović	33	Non-EU	Stade Lausanne Ouchy (Switzerland)	End of contract	Summer	Free	fcslo.ch
13	GK	(Bosnia and Herzegovina)	Vedran Kjosevski	31	Non-EU	Velež Mostar	End of contract	Summer	Free	fkvelez.ba
27	DF	(Bosnia and Herzegovina)	Kemal Osmanković	29	Non-EU	Lokomotiva (Croatia)	End of contract	Summer	Free	nklokomotiva.hr
30	GK	(Bosnia and Herzegovina)	Jasmin Kršić	26	Non-EU	TOŠK Tešanj	End of contract	Summer	Free	facebook.com/nktosktesanj
15	DF	(Australia)	Aleksandar Jovanović	37	Non-EU	Macarthur (Australia)	End of contract	Summer	Free	macarthur.com.au
11	DF	(Bosnia and Herzegovina)	Srđan Stanić	37	EU	Igman Konjic	End of contract	Summer	Free	fkigman.com
4	MF	(Bosnia and Herzegovina)	Amar Mehić	25	Non-EU	Igman Konjic	Loan	Summer	Free	fkigman.com
17	MF	(Bosnia and Herzegovina)	Dženan Osmanović	26	Non-EU	Igman Konjic	Loan	Summer	Free	fkigman.com
18	MF	(Bosnia and Herzegovina)	Edin Mujić	25	Non-EU	Jedinstvo Bihać	Loan	Summer	Free	nkjedinstvo.net
19	MF	(Bosnia and Herzegovina)	Damir Sadiković	31	Non-EU	Cracovia (Poland)	Transfer	Summer	€200,000	cracovia.pl
37	FW	(Bosnia and Herzegovina)	Anel Hajrić	30	EU	Celje (Slovenia)	Contract termination	Winter	Free	nk-celje.si
23	MF	(Bosnia and Herzegovina)	Nermin Jamak	40	Non-EU	Vis Simm-Bau	Contract termination	Winter	Free	facebook.com/nkvissimmbau
4	MF	(Bosnia and Herzegovina)	Haris Hajdarević	27	Non-EU	Boluspor (Turkey)	Transfer	Winter	€100,000	boluspor.org.tr
11	MF	(Bosnia and Herzegovina)	Asim Zec	32	Non-EU	Free agent	End of contract	Winter	Free	sport1.ba
4	MF	(Bosnia and Herzegovina)	Amar Mehić	25	Non-EU	Zvijezda Gradačac	Loan	Winter	Free	
–	DF	(Bosnia and Herzegovina)	Luka Malić	26	Non-EU	Željezničar Banja Luka	Loan	Winter	Free	fkzeljeznicar.ba
18	MF	(Bosnia and Herzegovina)	Edin Mujić	25	Non-EU	Goražde	Loan	Winter	Free	sportsport.ba

Total income: ▲€300,000
Net: ▲€300,000

== Club ==
=== Coaching staff ===
Name	Role
(Bosnia and Herzegovina) Blaž Slišković	Head coach
(Bosnia and Herzegovina) Almir Memić	Assistant coach
(Bosnia and Herzegovina) Adin Mulaosmanović	Assistant coach
(Bosnia and Herzegovina) Bakir Šerbo	Assistant coach
(Bosnia and Herzegovina) Irfan Fejzić	Goalkeeping coach
(Bosnia and Herzegovina) Anel Hidić	Fitness coach
(Bosnia and Herzegovina) Nedim Čović	Fitness coach
(Bosnia and Herzegovina) Hajro Mandal	Head scout
Vacant	Scout
(Bosnia and Herzegovina) Remzija Šetić	Psychologist
(Bosnia and Herzegovina) Raif Zeba	Physiotherapist
(Bosnia and Herzegovina) Mirza Halvadžija	Physiotherapist
(Bosnia and Herzegovina) Emin Džaferović	Physiotherapist
(Bosnia and Herzegovina) Erdijan Pekić	Commissioner for Security
(Bosnia and Herzegovina) Zlatko Dervišević	Doctor
(Bosnia and Herzegovina) Mahir Moro	Doctor

=== Other information ===
Honorary Chairman of the Club	(Bosnia and Herzegovina) Ivica Osim
Chairman of the Board	(Bosnia and Herzegovina) (England) Samir Cerić
Chairman of the Assembly	(Bosnia and Herzegovina) Edin Cernica
Chairman of the Supervisory Board	(Bosnia and Herzegovina) Damir Ablaković
Director	(Bosnia and Herzegovina) Mustafa Nurko
Head coach	(Bosnia and Herzegovina) Blaž Slišković
Ground (capacity and dimensions)	Grbavica Stadium (13,146 / 105x66 m)

Source: FK Željezničar and Grbavica Stadium

=== Sponsorship ===
As of 29 March 2021

Name	Type
(United Kingdom) Admiral Casino	Gold sponsor
(Bosnia and Herzegovina) Lutrija BiH	Gold sponsor
(Bosnia and Herzegovina) Sarajevo osiguranje	Gold sponsor
(Bosnia and Herzegovina) Telemach	Blue sponsor
(Croatia) Adriatic osiguranje	Sponsor
(Bosnia and Herzegovina) Garden City Konjic	Sponsor
(Bosnia and Herzegovina) Unigradnja	Sponsor
(Bosnia and Herzegovina) NEBI	Sponsor
(Bosnia and Herzegovina) Deny-Prom	Sponsor
(Bosnia and Herzegovina) Brajlović	Sponsor
(Bosnia and Herzegovina) Central osiguranje	Sponsor
(Bosnia and Herzegovina) Slatko i slano	Sponsor
(Bosnia and Herzegovina) ELPI Comerc	Sponsor
(Bosnia and Herzegovina) Media Market	Sponsor
(France) MGallery Tarčin Forest Resort	Sponsor
(Austria) (Switzerland) Rail Cargo Logistics	Sponsor
(Bosnia and Herzegovina) Bony	Sponsor
(Bosnia and Herzegovina) Rooster	Sponsor
(Bosnia and Herzegovina) SBC	Sponsor
(Bosnia and Herzegovina) Vivia	Sponsor
(France) Novotel	Sponsor
(Bosnia and Herzegovina) Eko sir Puđa	Sponsor
(Bosnia and Herzegovina) Roco commerce Livno	Sponsor
(Bosnia and Herzegovina) Infomedia	Sponsor
(Bosnia and Herzegovina) Emado	Sponsor
(Bosnia and Herzegovina) Mont Inženjering	Sponsor
(Bosnia and Herzegovina) Global Metal Construction	Sponsor
(Slovenia) Europlakat	Sponsor
(Bosnia and Herzegovina) Hidroinvest	Sponsor
(Bosnia and Herzegovina) Hotel Hills	Sponsor
(Bosnia and Herzegovina) (Germany) Transportbeton Kiseljak	Sponsor
(United Kingdom) (Netherlands) Unilever	Sponsor
(Bosnia and Herzegovina) Svjetlostkomerc	Sponsor
(Bosnia and Herzegovina) Winner Project	Sponsor
(Croatia) Franck	Sponsor
(Bosnia and Herzegovina) Imtec	Sponsor
(United States) Whirlpool	Sponsor
(Bosnia and Herzegovina) PAK Centar	Sponsor
(Bosnia and Herzegovina) ProTeam	Sponsor
(Bosnia and Herzegovina) Senigor	Sponsor
(Bosnia and Herzegovina) Gama AA Security	Sponsor
(Bosnia and Herzegovina) FIS	Sponsor
(Bosnia and Herzegovina) Amko komerc	Sponsor
(Bosnia and Herzegovina) BioMedicalab	Sponsor
(Bosnia and Herzegovina) In Time	Sponsor
(Czech Republic) Škoda	Sponsor
(Croatia) Sky Cola	Sponsor
(Slovenia) NLB Banka	Sponsor
(Bosnia and Herzegovina) Farmavita	Sponsor
(Bosnia and Herzegovina) Sarajevski kiseljak	Sponsor
(Croatia) Nexe	Sponsor
(Bosnia and Herzegovina) Hotel Grad	Sponsor
(Bosnia and Herzegovina) General Logistic	Technical sponsor
(Bosnia and Herzegovina) Leda	Technical sponsor
(Italy) Macron	Technical sponsor
(Switzerland) Blocksport	Partner
(Bosnia and Herzegovina) 1921.ba	Media partner
(Bosnia and Herzegovina) Hayat TV	Media partner
(Bosnia and Herzegovina) Antena Sarajevo	Media partner
(Bosnia and Herzegovina) Sport1.ba	Media partner
(Bosnia and Herzegovina) Klix	Media partner
(Bosnia and Herzegovina) Dnevni avaz	Media partner
(Bosnia and Herzegovina) Emado	Community partner
(Bosnia and Herzegovina) MFS-Emmaus	Community partner
(Bosnia and Herzegovina) Ruku na srce	Community partner
(Bosnia and Herzegovina) SUMERO	Community partner

== Competitions ==
=== Pre-season ===
1 July 2020 Friendly	Željezničar (Bosnia and Herzegovina)	3–2	(Bosnia and Herzegovina) Velež Mostar	Sarajevo
18:30	Ferreyra 32' (o.g.); Alispahić 83'; Lendrić 86' (pen.)	Report	Cvijanović 12', 59'	Stadium: Grbavica Stadium; Referee: Irfan Peljto (Sarajevo)

5 July 2020 Friendly	Željezničar (Bosnia and Herzegovina)	4–0	(Bosnia and Herzegovina) Goražde	Sarajevo
18:30	Juričić 10'; Lendrić 39', 45'; Stanić 63'	Report		Stadium: Grbavica Stadium

10 July 2020 Friendly	Željezničar (Bosnia and Herzegovina)	2–1	(Bosnia and Herzegovina) GOŠK Gabela	Sarajevo
18:30	Alispahić 17'; Lendrić 40'	Report	Šunjić 48'	Stadium: Grbavica Stadium

14 July 2020 Friendly	Bosna Visoko (Bosnia and Herzegovina)	0–3	(Bosnia and Herzegovina) Željezničar	Visoko
18:30		Report	Miletić 11'; Stanić 58'; Hajrić 68'	Stadium: Luke Stadium

18 July 2020 Friendly	Željezničar (Bosnia and Herzegovina)	1–1	(Bosnia and Herzegovina) Široki Brijeg	Sarajevo
18:00	Blažević 87'	Report	Radeljić 2'	Stadium: Grbavica Stadium; Referee: Haris Kaljanac (Sarajevo))

22 July 2020 Friendly	Željezničar (Bosnia and Herzegovina)	6–0	(Bosnia and Herzegovina) Igman Konjic	Sarajevo
18:15	Lendrić 35', 43', 62'; Juričić 48', 57'; Hajdarević 52'	Report		Stadium: Grbavica Stadium

25 July 2020 Friendly	Željezničar (Bosnia and Herzegovina)	3–1	(Bosnia and Herzegovina) Tuzla City	Sarajevo
18:30	Kosorić 26'; Juričić 29'; Miletič 90+2'	Report	Beganović 89' (pen.)	Stadium: Grbavica Stadium

29 July 2020 Friendly	Željezničar (Bosnia and Herzegovina)	7–0	(Bosnia and Herzegovina) TOŠK Tešanj	Sarajevo
18:30	Zec 13'; Hajrić 25', 39'; Lendrić 60', 68', 85'; Hajdarević 70'	Report		Stadium: Grbavica Stadium

=== Mid-season ===
2 August 2020 Friendly	Famos Hrasnica (Bosnia and Herzegovina)	0–6	(Bosnia and Herzegovina) Željezničar	Hrasnica
18:15		Report	Hajrić 1', 36', 55', 74'; Miletić 16'; Nargalić 86'	Stadium: Hrasnica Stadium

4 August 2020 Friendly	Željezničar (Bosnia and Herzegovina)	6–0	(Bosnia and Herzegovina) Bosna Visoko	Sarajevo
18:15	Mujić 11'; Duraković 43'; Zec 45'; Štilić 52'; Juričić 65'; Gasal 74'	Report		Stadium: Grbavica Stadium

18 August 2020 Friendly	Bosna Visoko (Bosnia and Herzegovina)	1–8	(Bosnia and Herzegovina) Željezničar	Visoko
17:40	Karišik	Report	Juričić; Subašić; Lendrić; Hajrić; Miletić	Stadium: Luke Stadium

15 September 2020 Friendly	Bosna Visoko (Bosnia and Herzegovina)	2–10	(Bosnia and Herzegovina) Željezničar	Visoko
17:00	Tahmaz	Report	Bekrić; Hajrić; Zec; Gasal; Subašić; Duraković	Stadium: Luke Stadium

24 September 2020 Friendly	Željezničar (Bosnia and Herzegovina)	14–0	(Bosnia and Herzegovina) Azot Vitkovići	Sarajevo
16:30	Zec; Gasal; Lendrić; Mujezinović; Hajrić; Miletić; Bekrić; Veselinović	Report		Stadium: Grbavica Stadium

10 October 2020 Friendly	Željezničar (Bosnia and Herzegovina)	2–0	(Bosnia and Herzegovina) Busovača	Sarajevo
16:30	Juričić; E. Zec	Report		Stadium: Grbavica Stadium

27 January 2021 Friendly	Neum (Bosnia and Herzegovina)	0–3	(Bosnia and Herzegovina) Željezničar	Neum
14:00		Report	Juričić 45' (pen.); Lendrić 65'; Nargalić 72'	Stadium: Meteriz Stadium

28 January 2021 Friendly	Željezničar (Bosnia and Herzegovina)	3–1	(Bosnia and Herzegovina) Čapljina	Čitluk
14:00	Zec 25'; Mujezinović 48'; Subašić 56' (pen.)	Report	Mace 59'	Stadium: Bare Stadium

30 January 2021 Friendly	Željezničar (Bosnia and Herzegovina)	4–1	(Bosnia and Herzegovina) Mladost Doboj Kakanj	Međugorje
14:30	Zec 12'; Alispahić 17'; Vrhovac 75'; Lendrić 90'	Report	Hiroš 41' (pen.)

2 February 2021 Friendly	Željezničar (Bosnia and Herzegovina)	0–0	(Bosnia and Herzegovina) Velež Mostar	Čitluk
14:00		Report		Stadium: Bare Stadium

6 February 2021 Friendly	Željezničar (Bosnia and Herzegovina)	1–2	(Bosnia and Herzegovina) Zrinjski Mostar	Međugorje
14:30	Zec 84'	Report	Yenin 30'; Govedarica 73'

10 February 2021 Friendly	Ljubuški (Bosnia and Herzegovina)	1–8	(Bosnia and Herzegovina) Željezničar	Ljubuški
14:30	Bencun 3'	Report	Štilić 2', 20', 27'; Subašić 19'; Kulašin 46'; Bekrić 65'; Zec 67'; Mujić 76'	Stadium: Babovac Stadium

11 February 2021 Friendly	Brotnjo (Bosnia and Herzegovina)	0–2	(Bosnia and Herzegovina) Željezničar	Čitluk
14:30		Report	Bekrić 73' (pen.); Nargalić 76'	Stadium: Bare Stadium

12 February 2021 Friendly	Grude (Bosnia and Herzegovina)	0–0	(Bosnia and Herzegovina) Željezničar	Grude
14:30		Report		Stadium: Elić Luka Stadium

13 February 2021 Friendly	Željezničar (Bosnia and Herzegovina)	2–1	(Bosnia and Herzegovina) Krupa	Međugorje
14:30	Štilić 28' (pen.); Lendrić 85'	Report	Pavlović 44'

21 February 2021 Friendly	Željezničar (Bosnia and Herzegovina)	1–0	(Bosnia and Herzegovina) Široki Brijeg	Sarajevo
15:00	Alispahić 56'	Report		Stadium: Grbavica Stadium

=== Overall ===
Competition	Started round	Final result	First match	Last Match
Premijer Liga BiH	—N/a	7th	1 August 2020	30 May 2021
Kup BiH	Round of 32	Quarter-finals	30 September 2020	10 March 2021
UEFA Europa League	First qualifying round	First qualifying round	9 September 2020	9 September 2020

=== League table ===
Pos	Team	Pld	W	D	L	GF	GA	GD	Pts	Qualification or relegation
5	Zrinjski Mostar	33	18	5	10	50	30	+20	59 (Note: Since fourth place decided UEFA Europa Conference League qualification, goal difference and goals scored were not used to rank teams. Head-to-head points: Široki Brijeg 6, Zrinjski Mostar 3.)	
6	Tuzla City	33	13	9	11	36	35	+1	48	
7	Željezničar	33	12	8	13	50	43	+7	44	
8	Sloboda Tuzla	33	10	7	16	31	41	−10	37	
9	Mladost Doboj Kakanj (Note: Mladost Doboj Kakanj initially avoided relegation to the Prva Liga FBiH, but were then relegated to the league due to failing to obtain a license for the Premier League.) (R)	33	8	6	19	26	57	−31	30	Relegation to the Prva Liga FBiH

Source: Rezultati.com
Rules for classification: 1) Points; 2) Goal difference; 3) Goals scored; 4) Head-to-head points; 5) Head-to-head goal difference; 6) Head-to-head away goals (only if two teams); 7) Head-to-head goals scored; 8) Goal difference; 9) Play-off. (Criteria 2 and 3 are not used to decide champion, UEFA competition qualification, or relegation)
(R) Relegated

==== Results summary ====
Overall								Home						Away					
Pld	W	D	L	GF	GA	GD	Pts	W	D	L	GF	GA	GD	W	D	L	GF	GA	GD
33	12	8	13	50	43	+7	44	6	4	7	24	21	+3	6	4	6	26	22	+4

Source: Sportsport.ba

==== Results by round ====
Round	1	2	3	4	5	7	8	10	11	12	6	13	9	14	15	16	17	18	19	20	21	22	23	24	25	26	27	28	29	30	31	32	33
Ground	H	A	H	A	H	A	H	H	A	A	H	H	A	A	H	A	A	H	A	H	A	H	H	A	H	A	H	A	H	A	H	A	H
Result	W	W	W	W	L	W	L	W	W	D	W	W	D	L	D	W	W	L	L	D	L	L	D	L	D	D	L	L	L	D	L	L	W
Position	2	2	1	1	1	2	3	3	3	3	2	2	2	2	2	2	2	2	2	2	4	6	6	6	7	7	7	7	7	7	7	7	7
Points	3	6	9	12	12	15	15	18	21	22	25	28	29	29	30	33	36	36	36	37	37	37	38	38	39	40	40	40	40	41	41	41	44

Source: Competitions
A = Away; H = Home; W = Win; D = Draw; L = Loss

==== Matches ====
1 August 2020 1	Željezničar	3–0	Velež Mostar	Sarajevo
20:30	Juričić 16', (yellow card) 66'; Ikić (yellow card) 18'; Mujezinović 21'; Lendrić 30'; Milićević (yellow card) 90'	Report	Radovac (yellow card) 89'	Stadium: Grbavica Stadium; Attendance: 0 Referee: Sabrija Topalović (Zenica)

7 August 2020 2	Radnik Bijeljina	0–2	Željezničar	Bijeljina
17:00	Mekić (yellow card) 27'; Novaković (yellow card) 45+1'; Gogić (yellow card) 59'; Šubert (yellow card) 67'; Karić (yellow card) 77'	Report	Ikić (yellow card) 3'; Gasal (yellow card) 24'; Mujezinović 34'; Stevanović (yellow card) 52'; Štilić 67' (pen.); Subašić (yellow card) 88'	Stadium: Gradski stadion Attendance: 0 Referee: Dragan Petrović (Banja Luka)

11 August 2020 3	Željezničar	2–1	Borac Banja Luka	Sarajevo
17:00	Ikić (yellow card) 15'; Štilić 50' (pen.); Mujezinović 61'; Kosorić (yellow card) 79'	Report	Danilović (yellow card) 25', (goal) 56'; Kajkut (yellow card) 79'	Stadium: Grbavica Stadium; Attendance: 0 Referee: Ermin Sivac (Zenica)

15 August 2020 4	Sloboda Tuzla	0–2	Željezničar	Tuzla
19:00		Report	Lendrić 8'; Stevanović (yellow card) 58'; Mujezinović 73'	Stadium: Tušanj City Stadium; Attendance: 0 Referee: Sabrija Topalović (Zenica)

21 August 2020 5	Željezničar	0–1	Mladost Doboj Kakanj	Sarajevo
19:00	Miletić (yellow card) 58'; Kosorić (yellow card) 67'	Report	Hadžić 32'; Dedić (yellow card) 45+2'; Hiroš (yellow card) 70'; Alić (yellow card) 75'; Begić (yellow card) 80'; Mahmić (yellow card) 90+1'	Stadium: Grbavica Stadium; Attendance: 0 Referee: Aleksandar Njegomirović (Prnjavor)

13 September 2020 7	Široki Brijeg	0–1	Željezničar	Široki Brijeg
18:00	Obšivač (yellow card) 62'; Ćorić (yellow card) 65'; Stanić (yellow card) 90+3'	Report	Mujezinović 72'; Stevanović (yellow card) 74'; Šehić (yellow card) 82'; Kosorić (yellow card) 90'	Stadium: Pecara Stadium; Attendance: 0 Referee: Ermin Sivac (Zenica)

19 September 2020 8	Željezničar	0–1	Krupa	Sarajevo
20:00	Blažević (yellow card) 15'; Štilić (yellow card) 35'; Mujezinović (yellow card) 38'; Šehić (yellow card) 64'	Report	Makitan 16'; Svraka (yellow card) 74'; Mandić (yellow card) 76'; Simonović (yellow card) 78'; Maksimović (yellow card) 86'	Stadium: Grbavica Stadium; Attendance: 0 Referee: Frano Jelić (Široki Brijeg)

5 October 2020 10	Željezničar	1–0	Tuzla City	Sarajevo
20:00	Stevanović (yellow card) 36' (yellow-red card) 79'; Bekrić 63'; Erić (yellow card) 90+2'	Report	Karjašević (yellow card) 50'; Morris (yellow card) 59'; Muminović (yellow card) 90+4'; Rugašević (yellow card) 90+4'	Stadium: Grbavica Stadium; Attendance: 0 Referee: Dragan Petrović (Banja Luka)

17 October 2020 11	Olimpik	0–3	Željezničar	Sarajevo
15:00	Imamović (yellow card) 23'; Perišić (yellow card) 33'; Osmanović (yellow card) 58'	Report	Mujezinović (yellow card) 32'; Lendrić 38', 71'; Alispahić (yellow card) 41'; Hajdarević (yellow card) 45+3'; Štilić 85'	Stadium: Otoka Stadium; Attendance: 0 Referee: Aleksandar Njegomirović (Prnjavor)

24 October 2020 12	Velež Mostar	1–1	Željezničar	Mostar
17:00	Mulić 7'; Čivić (yellow card) 24' (yellow-red card) 56'; Anđušić (yellow card) 64'; Radovac (yellow card) 77'	Report	Štilić (yellow card) 26'; A. Zec (yellow card) 45+1'; Stevanović (yellow card) 52'; Alispahić 81'	Stadium: Stadion Rođeni; Attendance: 0 Referee: Luka Bilbija (Prijedor)

28 October 2020 6 (Note: Match of Round 6 postponed because of Željezničar's participation in UEFA Europa League first qualifying round.)	Željezničar	1–0	Zrinjski Mostar	Sarajevo
16:30	Ikić 71'	Report	Ćorluka (yellow card) 41'; Yenin (yellow card) 48'	Stadium: Grbavica Stadium; Attendance: 0 Referee: Elvis Mujić (Banovići)

31 October 2020 13	Željezničar	3–1	Radnik Bijeljina	Sarajevo
19:00	Blažević (yellow card) 30'; Štilić 34'; Milićević 45'; Veselinović (yellow card) 50'; Lendrić 90'	Report	Vušurović 15'; Huseinbašić (yellow card) 30'; Janjić (yellow card) 75'	Stadium: Grbavica Stadium; Attendance: 0 Referee: Sabrija Topalović (Zenica)

4 November 2020 9 (Note: Match of Round 9 postponed because of Sarajevo's participation in UEFA Europa League play-off round.)	Sarajevo	1–1	Željezničar	Sarajevo
18:30	Kovačević (yellow card) 24'; Rahmanović 38'; Handžić (yellow card) 43'; Šerbečić (yellow card) 58'; Jukić (yellow card) 67'; Fanimo (yellow card) 77'	Report	Kosorić (yellow card) 28'; Alispahić 66'	Stadium: Asim Ferhatović Hase Stadium; Attendance: 0 Referee: Irfan Peljto (Sarajevo)

9 November 2020 14	Borac Banja Luka	4–3	Željezničar	Banja Luka
18:00	Lukić 5'; Vranješ 17'; Zakarić 39', 85'; Milojević (yellow card) 49'; Vojnović (yellow card) 58'	Report	Stevanović 7', (yellow card) 81'; E. Zec 23', 52'; Ikić (yellow card) 51'; Kosorić (yellow card) 54'; Hajdarević (yellow card) 64'; Juričić (yellow card) 90'	Stadium: Banja Luka City Stadium; Attendance: 0 Referee: Frano Jelić (Široki Brijeg)

21 November 2020 15	Željezničar	2–2	Sloboda Tuzla	Sarajevo
15:00	Juričić 22'; Stevanović (yellow card) 34'; Štilić 75'	Report	Kurtalić 2'; Predragović (yellow card) 26'; Beganović (yellow card) 28'; Maksimović (yellow card) 61'; Alić 89'	Stadium: Grbavica Stadium; Attendance: 0 Referee: Dragan Petrović (Banja Luka)

27 November 2020 16	Mladost Doboj Kakanj	0–4	Željezničar	Doboj
13:00	Begić (yellow card) 34'; Dedić (yellow card) 55'; Šišić (yellow card) 58'	Report	Juričić 26'; Kosorić (yellow card) 29'; E. Zec 59'; Hajdarević (yellow card) 72'; Štilić 81'; Veselinović 89'	Stadium: MGM Farm Arena; Attendance: 0 Referee: Elvis Mujić (Banovići)

2 December 2020 17	Zrinjski Mostar	1–2	Željezničar	Mostar
15:00	Bilbija 28'; Jakovljević (yellow card) 73'; Stojkić (yellow card) 78'; Ivančić (yellow card) 84'; Bekić (yellow card) 90'	Report	Miletić 58'; Bekrić 90'; Juričić (yellow card) 90+1'	Stadium: Stadion pod Bijelim Brijegom; Attendance: 0 Referee: Ermin Sivac (Zenica)

6 December 2020 18	Željezničar	2–3	Široki Brijeg	Sarajevo
15:00	Hajdarević (yellow card) 29'; Štilić (yellow card) 64'; Veselinović (yellow card) 71'; Subašić (yellow card) 82'; Lendrić 90+2'; Bojo 90+3'	Report	Marić 15'; Jović (yellow card) 39'; Ćorić (yellow card) 82'; S. Jurić 84'; Miškić (yellow card) 86'; Pervan 87'	Stadium: Grbavica Stadium; Attendance: 0 Referee: Dragan Petrović (Banja Luka)

12 December 2020 19	Krupa	2–1	Željezničar	Krupa na Vrbasu
13:00	Aćimović 26'; Palić (yellow card) 32'; Dujaković 74' (pen.), (yellow card) 90+3'; Abdulahović (yellow card) 76'; Modić (yellow card) 90+1'; Mandić (yellow card) 90+2'	Report	Kosorić (yellow card) 29'; Milićević (yellow card) 32' (yellow-red card) 45+2'; Juričić 67'; Alispahić (yellow card) 78'	Stadium: Gradski Stadion; Attendance: 0 Referee: Frano Jelić (Široki Brijeg)

1 March 2021 20	Željezničar	0–0	Sarajevo	Sarajevo
17:30	Kosorić (yellow card) 48'; Bojo (yellow card) 64'	Report	Pejović (yellow card) 21'; Miličević (yellow card) 29'; Oremuš (yellow card) 69'; Dupovac (yellow card) 70'; Adukor (yellow card) 90+1'	Stadium: Grbavica Stadium; Attendance: 0 Referee: Irfan Peljto (Sarajevo)

6 March 2021 21	Tuzla City	2–0	Željezničar	Tuzla
14:00	Mišić 9' (pen.); Brkić (yellow card) 83'; Maksimović 90+3'	Report	Miletić (yellow card) 32'	Stadium: Tušanj City Stadium; Attendance: 0 Referee: Dragan Petrović (Banja Luka)

15 March 2021 22	Željezničar	0–1	Olimpik	Sarajevo
17:00	Čeliković (yellow card) 30'; Stevanović (yellow card) 40'; Šehić (yellow card) 66'; Juričić (yellow card) 90'	Report	Milović (yellow card) 7'; Handžić (yellow card) 71'; Hadžanović (yellow card) 72'; Osmanović 87'; Imamović (yellow card) 88'	Stadium: Grbavica Stadium; Attendance: 0 Referee: Mateo Musa (Čitluk)

21 March 2021 23	Željezničar	0–0	Tuzla City	Sarajevo
17:00	Čeliković (yellow card) 22'; Ikić (yellow card) 48' (yellow-red card) 90'; Zec (yellow card) 79'; Miletić (yellow card) 87'	Report	Lučić (yellow card) 42'; Muminović (yellow card) 72'; Doffo (yellow card) 90'; Crnkić (red card) 90'	Stadium: Grbavica Stadium; Attendance: 0 Referee: Aleksandar Njegomirović (Prnjavor)

3 April 2021 24	Sloboda Tuzla	1–0	Željezničar	Tuzla
15:00	Maksimović 49'; Jusić (yellow card) 78'; Golubović (yellow card) 87'	Report	Kosorić (yellow card) 31'; Bojo (yellow card) 32'; Stevanović (yellow card) 37'; Šehić (yellow card) 78'; Čeliković (yellow card) 90'	Stadium: Tušanj City Stadium; Attendance: 0 Referee: Ermin Sivac (Zenica)

10 April 2021 25	Željezničar	4–4	Mladost Doboj Kakanj	Sarajevo
17:00	Zec 16', 90+1'; Stevanović (yellow card) 58'; Juričić 68'; Miletić (yellow card) 88'; Alispahić (yellow card) 90'; Štilić 90+4' (pen.)	Report	Hadžić 3', 17'; Hiroš 8', (yellow card) 45'; Sadiku (yellow card) 33' (yellow-red card) 66'; Dedić (yellow card) 39'; Žulj (red card) 39'; Alić 89', (yellow card) 90'	Stadium: Grbavica Stadium; Attendance: 0 Referee: Elvis Mujić (Banovići)

18 April 2021 26	Radnik Bijeljina	1–1	Željezničar	Bijeljina
17:00	Popara 60'	Report	Štilić 15'; Subašić (yellow card) 48'; Blažević (yellow card) 66'; Ikić (yellow card) 72'	Stadium: Gradski stadion Attendance: 0 Referee: Frano Jelić (Široki Brijeg)

25 April 2021 27	Željezničar	1–2	Olimpik	Sarajevo
17:00	Bojo 15'; Stevanović (yellow card) 69'; Juričić (yellow card) 82'	Report	Milović 33'; Isić (yellow card) 55'; Gavrić (yellow card) 60'; Šišić 73'	Stadium: Grbavica Stadium; Attendance: 0 Referee: Irfan Peljto (Sarajevo)

1 May 2021 28	Sarajevo	3–1	Željezničar	Sarajevo
16:55	Miličević (yellow card) 23'; Dupovac (yellow card) 23'; Fanimo 38', 61'; Mešanović 45'; Oremuš (yellow card) 89'	Report	Kosorić (yellow card) 23'; Ikić (yellow card) 23'; Juričić 72'; Bekrić (yellow card) 90'	Stadium: Asim Ferhatović Hase Stadium; Attendance: 0 Referee: Haris Kaljanac (Sarajevo)

7 May 2021 29	Željezničar	1–3	Široki Brijeg	Sarajevo
20:00	Veselinović 74'; Čeliković (yellow card) 90'	Report	M. Jurić (yellow card) 39'; S. Jurić 77'; Begić 82'; Stanić 90'	Stadium: Grbavica Stadium; Attendance: 0 Referee: Zoran Grbić (Prijedor)

12 May 2021 30	Velež Mostar	2–2	Željezničar	Mostar
18:00	Georgijević 15'; Ćosić (yellow card) 22'; Zvonić (yellow card) 58'; Ovčina 77'	Report	Milićević 24'; Juričić 36', (yellow card) 47'; Alispahić (yellow card) 52'; Blažević (yellow card) 85'; Vrhovac (yellow card) 88'; Šehić (yellow card) 90'	Stadium: Stadion Rođeni; Attendance: 0 Referee: Antoni Bandić (Grude)

16 May 2021 31	Željezničar	1–2	Borac Banja Luka	Sarajevo
17:00	Ikić (yellow card) 45'; Čeliković (yellow card) 49'; Bojo (yellow card) 83'; Bekrić 90'	Report	Uzelac (yellow card) 42'; Zakarić 67'; Meleg 73'; Ćorić (yellow card) 79'	Stadium: Grbavica Stadium; Attendance: 0 Referee: Elvis Mujić (Banovići)

23 May 2021 32	Zrinjski Mostar	4–2	Željezničar	Mostar
17:00	Bašić 5'; Tičinović 7'; Bilbija 59', 66'	Report	Ikić 44'; Bekrić 52'; Šehić (yellow card) 80'	Stadium: Stadion pod Bijelim Brijegom; Attendance: 0 Referee: Elvis Mujić (Banovići)

30 May 2021 33	Željezničar	3–0	Krupa	Sarajevo
17:00	Juričić 5'; Gasal 26'; Duraković 58', (yellow card) 66'	Report	Ćivić (yellow card) 25'; Makitan (yellow card) 51'; Muminović (yellow card) 61'	Stadium: Grbavica Stadium; Attendance: 0 Referee: Miloš Gigović (Gradiška)

=== Kup BiH ===
==== Round of 32 ====
30 September 2020	Budućnost Banovići	1–2	Željezničar	Banovići
16:00	Mahmutović (yellow card) 14'; Junuzović 59'	Report	Štilić 31'; Berbić 37' (o.g.)	Stadium: Stadion FK Budućnost; Attendance: 0 Referee: Luka Bilbija (Prijedor)

==== Round of 16 ====
21 October 2020	Željezničar	3–0	Goražde	Sarajevo
15:00	Bojo 67'; Vrhovac 72'; Juričić 77' (pen.)	Report	Karačić (yellow card) 58'	Stadium: Grbavica Stadium; Attendance: 0 Referee: Zoran Grbić (Prijedor)

==== Quarter-finals ====
10 March 2021	Tuzla City	1–1 (3–2 p)	Željezničar	Tuzla
14:00	Brkić 49'; Lučić (yellow card) 60'; Karjašević (yellow card) 89'	Report	Stevanović (yellow card) 35'; Ikić (yellow card) 48'; Bekrić 61' (pen.); Šehić (yellow card) 70'; Lendrić (yellow card) 71'	Stadium: Tušanj City Stadium; Attendance: 0 Referee: Ermin Sivac (Zenica)
	Penalties
	Lučić (penalty scored); Rustemović (penalty scored); Ubiparip (penalty scored); Morris (penalty missed)		(penalty missed) Štilić; (penalty scored) Ikić; (penalty scored) Lendrić; (penalty missed) Vrhovac; (penalty missed) Milićević

=== UEFA Europa League ===
==== First qualifying round ====
9 September 2020 (Note: The 2020–21 UEFA Europa League first qualifying round match between Maccabi Haifa and Željezničar, originally scheduled to be played on 27 August 2020 was postponed due to five members from Željezničar's delegation testing positive for COVID-19 and the whole team being put into quarantine by the Israeli authorities.)	Maccabi Haifa (Israel)	3–1	(Bosnia and Herzegovina) Željezničar	Haifa
	Chery 38'; Rukavytsya 59'; Ashkenazi 66'	Report	Lendrić 34'; Alispahić (yellow card) 54'; Hajdarević (yellow card) 58'; Stevanović (yellow card) 64'; Kosorić (yellow card) 82'; Juričić (yellow card) 88'; Blažević (yellow card) 90+5'	Stadium: Sammy Ofer Stadium; Attendance: 0 Referee: Jørgen Burchardt (Denmark)
