= Štilić =

Štilić is a surname of Bosnian origin. See also:

- Ismet Štilić (born 31 July 1960), a retired Bosnian footballer who played as a midfielder, father of Semir.
- Semir Štilić (born 8 October 1987), a Bosnian footballer who plays as an attacking midfielder, son of Ismet.
