= Mustafa Mujezinović =

Mustafa Mujezinović may refer to:

- Mustafa Mujezinović (footballer) (born 1993), Bosnian football player
- Mustafa Mujezinović (politician) (1954–2019), Bosnian politician
