= Saša Maksimović =

Saša Maksimović may refer to:

- Saša Maksimović (footballer)
- Saša Maksimović (politician)
