= Irfan Fejzić =

Bosnian association football player

Personal information
- Full name: Irfan Fejzić
- Date of birth: 1 July 1986 (age 40)
- Place of birth: Sarajevo, SFR Yugoslavia
- Height: 1.85 m (6 ft 1 in)
- Position: Goalkeeper

Youth career
- –2006: Sarajevo

Senior career*
| Years | Team | Apps | (Gls) |
| 2006–2009 | Sarajevo | 11 | (0) |
| 2009–2010 | Goražde | | |
| 2010 | Olimpik | 11 | (0) |
| 2010–2011 | Mughan | 13 | (0) |
| 2011 | Zvijezda Gradačac | 7 | (0) |
| 2011–2013 | Olimpik | 38 | (0) |
| 2013–2014 | Rudar Kakanj | 4 | (0) |
| 2014–2015 | Sloboda Tuzla | 13 | (0) |
| 2015–2016 | Olimpik | 6 | (0) |
| 2016–2019 | Željezničar | 18 | (0) |
| 2019–2020 | Sloboda Tuzla | 1 | (0) |
| 2020–2021 | Željezničar | 8 | (0) |
- * Club domestic league appearances and goals as of 21 March 2021

Irfan Fejzić (born 1 July 1986) is a Bosnian professional footballer who plays as a goalkeeper.

== Career statistics ==
=== Club ===
As of match played 21 March 2021.

Appearances and goals by club, season and competition
| Club | Season | League | League | | Cup | | Continental | | Total | |
| Club | Season | League | Apps | Goals | Apps | Goals | Apps | Goals | Apps | Goals |
|---|---|---|---|---|---|---|---|---|---|---|
| Sarajevo | 2006–07 | Bosnian Premier League | 3 | 0 | 0 | 0 | 0 | 0 | 3 | 0 |
| Sarajevo | 2007–08 | Bosnian Premier League | 7 | 0 | 0 | 0 | 3 | 0 | 10 | 0 |
| Sarajevo | 2008–09 | Bosnian Premier League | 1 | 0 | 0 | 0 | — | | 1 | 0 |
| Sarajevo | Total | | 11 | 0 | 0 | 0 | 3 | 0 | 14 | 0 |
| Olimpik | 2009–10 | Bosnian Premier League | 11 | 0 | 0 | 0 | — | | 11 | 0 |
| Mughan | 2010–11 | Azerbaijan Premier League | 13 | 0 | — | | — | | 13 | 0 |
| Zvijezda Gradačac | 2010–11 | Bosnian Premier League | 7 | 0 | — | | — | | 7 | 0 |
| Olimpik | 2011–12 | Bosnian Premier League | 22 | 0 | 0 | 0 | — | | 22 | 0 |
| Olimpik | 2012–13 | Bosnian Premier League | 16 | 0 | 2 | 0 | — | | 18 | 0 |
| Olimpik | Total | | 38 | 0 | 2 | 0 | — | | 40 | 0 |
| Rudar Kakanj | 2013–14 | First League of FBiH | 4 | 0 | — | | — | | 4 | 0 |
| Sloboda Tuzla | 2014–15 | Bosnian Premier League | 13 | 0 | 0 | 0 | — | | 13 | 0 |
| Olimpik | 2015–16 | Bosnian Premier League | 13 | 0 | 0 | 0 | — | | 13 | 0 |
| Željezničar | 2015–16 | Bosnian Premier League | 3 | 0 | 0 | 0 | – | | 3 | 0 |
| Željezničar | 2016–17 | Bosnian Premier League | 3 | 0 | 3 | 0 | – | | 6 | 0 |
| Željezničar | 2017–18 | Bosnian Premier League | 2 | 0 | 1 | 0 | 0 | 0 | 3 | 0 |
| Željezničar | 2018–19 | Bosnian Premier League | 10 | 0 | 1 | 0 | 0 | 0 | 11 | 0 |
| Željezničar | Total | | 18 | 0 | 5 | 0 | 0 | 0 | 23 | 0 |
| Sloboda Tuzla | 2019–20 | Bosnian Premier League | 1 | 0 | 2 | 0 | — | | 3 | 0 |
| Željezničar | 2020–21 | Bosnian Premier League | 8 | 0 | 1 | 0 | 1 | 0 | 10 | 0 |
| Career total | | | 137 | 0 | 10 | 0 | 4 | 0 | 151 | 0 |

== Personal life ==
Fejzić's cousin, Nevres, is also a professional footballer who plays as a goalkeeper for Bosnian Premier League club Tuzla City.

== Honours ==
Sarajevo

- Bosnian Premier League: 2006–07

Željezničar

- Bosnian Cup: 2017–18
