= Eldar Šehić =

Bosnian footballer

Personal information
- Date of birth: 28 April 2000 (age 26)
- Place of birth: Sarajevo, Bosnia and Herzegovina
- Height: 1.83 m (6 ft 0 in)
- Position: Left back

Team information
- Current team: Třinec
- Number: 33

Youth career
- Sarajevo
- 2016: Olimpic
- 2016–2018: Željezničar

Senior career*
Years	Team	Apps	(Gls)
2018–2021	Željezničar	23	(0)
2019	→ TOŠK Tešanj (loan)	25	(1)
2021–2023	Karviná	15	(0)
2022–2023	→ Baník Ostrava (loan)	25	(0)
2023–2026	Baník Ostrava	20	(0)
2023–2026	Baník Ostrava B	7	(0)
2024–2025	→ Pardubice (loan)	22	(0)
2026–	Třinec	0	(0)

International career^{‡}
2018	Bosnia and Herzegovina U19	6	(0)
2020–	Bosnia and Herzegovina U21	2	(0)
- * Club domestic league appearances and goals as of 5 February 2026 ‡ National team caps and goals as of 29 March 2021

Eldar Šehić (Bosnian pronunciation: [ěldar ʃêːxitɕ]; born 28 April 2000) is a Bosnian professional footballer who plays as a left back for Třinec.

Šehić started his professional career at Željezničar, who loaned him to TOŠK Tešanj in 2019.

== Club career ==
=== Željezničar ===
Šehić started playing football at his hometown club Sarajevo, which he left in February 2016 to join Olimpic's youth setup. In July, he joined Željezničar's youth academy. On 17 July 2018, he signed his first professional contract with the team. He made his professional against Čelik Zenica on 29 July at the age of 18.

In February 2019, Šehić was sent on a six-month loan to TOŠK Tešanj. In July, his loan was extended for an additional season, but he was recalled in November. On 15 September, he scored his first professional goal against Metalleghe-BSI.

In June 2021, Šehić left Željezničar.

On 21 August 2024, Šehić joined Pardubice on a one-year loan deal without option.

On 17 August 2026, Šehić signed a contract with Czech National Football League club Třinec.

== Personal life ==
Eldar is the younger brother of Benjamin who currently plays for First League of BH club Radnik Hadžići.

== International career ==
Šehić has represented Bosnia and Herzegovina at various youth levels.

== Career statistics ==
=== Club ===
As of match played 23 May 2021

Club	Season	League			Cup		Continental		Total	
Club	Season	Division	Apps	Goals	Apps	Goals	Apps	Goals	Apps	Goals
Željezničar	2018–19	Bosnian Premier League	4	0	1	0	0	0	5	0
Željezničar	2019–20	Bosnian Premier League	1	0	0	0	–		1	0
Željezničar	2020–21	Bosnian Premier League	18	0	2	0	1	0	21	0
Željezničar	Total		23	0	3	0	1	0	27	0
TOŠK Tešanj (loan)	2018–19	First League of FBiH	12	0	0	0	–		12	0
TOŠK Tešanj (loan)	2019–20	First League of FBiH	13	1	1	0	–		14	1
TOŠK Tešanj (loan)	Total		25	1	1	0	–		26	1
Career total			48	1	4	0	1	0	53	1
