= Nevres Fejzić =

Bosnian footballer

Personal information
- Full name: Nevres Fejzić
- Date of birth: 4 November 1990 (age 35)
- Place of birth: Zvornik, SFR Yugoslavia
- Height: 1.85 m (6 ft 1 in)
- Position: Goalkeeper

Team information
- Current team: Tuzla City
- Number: 27

Youth career
- 2000–2010: Drina Zvornik

Senior career*
Years	Team	Apps	(Gls)
2010–2011	Radnik Hadžići	26	(0)
2011–2014	Travnik	56	(0)
2014–2017	Metalleghe-BSI	80	(0)
2017–2018	Krupa	21	(0)
2018–	Tuzla City	114	(0)

International career
2011–2012	Bosnia and Herzegovina U21	0	(0)
- * Club domestic league appearances and goals as of 13 March 2024

Nevres Fejzić (born 4 November 1990) is a Bosnian professional footballer who plays as a goalkeeper for Bosnian Premier League club Tuzla City.

== Club career ==
=== Early career ===
Fejzić started off his career as a youngster at local club Drina Zvornik, but signed his first professional contract with Radnik Hadžići in the summer of 2010. After one season at Radnik, he signed a contract with Bosnian Premier League club Travnik in July 2011, for who he played three years.

In the summer of 2014, Fejzić signed with newly promoted First League of FBiH team Metalleghe-BSI. He won the First League of FBiH with Metalleghe and got promoted to the Bosnian Premier League in the 2015–16 season. Fejzić left Metalleghe-BSI after the end of the 2016–17 Premier League season.

=== Krupa ===
On 22 June 2017, Fejzić signed a one-year contract with Krupa. He made his official debut for Krupa on 12 August 2017, in a 1–0 away league loss against Zrinjski Mostar.

In May 2018, with Krupa, he finished as Bosnian Cup runner-up, after losing to Željezničar in the 2017–18 Bosnian cup final. Fejzić left the club on 30 May 2018, after his contract with Krupa expired.

=== Tuzla City ===
Only one week after leaving Krupa, on 7 June 2018, Fejzić signed a contract with newly promoted Bosnian Premier League side Tuzla City, at that time still known as Sloga Simin Han. He made his first appearance for Tuzla City on 22 July 2018, in a 1–0 away league loss against Široki Brijeg.

On 23 February 2019, in a league game against Sarajevo, Fejzić suffered a concussion after accidentally getting hit in the head by Sarajevo captain Krste Velkoski, after which he needed to stay at a hospital for 24 hours in order to get proper treatment. In a 2020–21 Bosnian Premier League game against Mladost Doboj Kakanj on 15 August 2020, he earned himself a straight red card after fouling an opposing player.

== International career ==
Fejzić represented Bosnia and Herzegovina at under-21 level from 2011 to 2012.

== Career statistics ==
=== Club ===
As of match played 16 October 2021.

Appearances and goals by club, season and competition
Club	Season	League			Cup		Continental		Total	
Club	Season	Division	Apps	Goals	Apps	Goals	Apps	Goals	Apps	Goals
Radnik Hadžići	2010–11	First League of FBiH	26	0	—		—		26	0
Travnik	2011–12	Bosnian Premier League	23	0	0	0	—		23	0
Travnik	2012–13	Bosnian Premier League	26	0	0	0	—		26	0
Travnik	2013–14	Bosnian Premier League	7	0	0	0	—		7	0
Travnik	Total		56	0	0	0	—		56	0
Metalleghe-BSI	2014–15	First League of FBiH	23	0	0	0	—		24	0
Metalleghe-BSI	2015–16	First League of FBiH	26	0	—		—		26	0
Metalleghe-BSI	2016–17	Bosnian Premier League	31	0	1	0	—		32	0
Metalleghe-BSI	Total		80	0	1	0	—		81	0
Krupa	2017–18	Bosnian Premier League	21	0	4	0	—		25	0
Tuzla City	2018–19	Bosnian Premier League	28	0	0	0	—		28	0
Tuzla City	2019–20	Bosnian Premier League	14	0	1	0	—		15	0
Tuzla City	2020–21	Bosnian Premier League	20	0	2	0	—		22	0
Tuzla City	2021–22	Bosnian Premier League	11	0	0	0	—		11	0
Tuzla City	Total		73	0	3	0	—		76	0
Career total			256	0	8	0	—		264	0

== Personal life ==
Nevres's cousin Irfan Fejzić is also a professional footballer who plays as a goalkeeper.

== Honours ==
Metalleghe-BSI

- First League of FBiH: 2015–16

Krupa

- Bosnian Cup runner-up: 2017–18
