= Anel Dedić =

Bosnian footballer

Personal information
- Full name: Anel Dedić
- Date of birth: 2 May 1991 (age 35)
- Place of birth: Zenica, SFR Yugoslavia
- Height: 1.86 m (6 ft 1 in)
- Position: Midfielder

Team information
- Current team: Mladost Doboj Kakanj
- Number: 23

Youth career
- Vitez
- –2010: Bosna Visoko

Senior career*
Years	Team	Apps	(Gls)
2010–2014	Vitez (Note: Matches not including 2010–11 season)	49	(13)
2014–2016	Čelik Zenica	49	(12)
2016–2017	Vitez	25	(4)
2017–2018	Teuta Durrës	29	(7)
2018–2020	Čelik Zenica	42	(9)
2020–	Mladost Doboj Kakanj	21	(3)
- * Club domestic league appearances and goals as of 10 April 2021

Anel Dedić (born 2 May 1991) is a Bosnian professional footballer who plays as a midfielder for Bosnian Premier League club Mladost Doboj Kakanj.

== Career ==
=== Early career ===
In the 2012–13 season, Dedić was named "League's Player of the Season" of First League of FBiH. During the season he scored 9 goals.

Dedić made his top flight debut for Vitez under Valentin Plavčić management on 27 July 2013, in a league match against Travnik where he scored his team's only goal. He managed to win a place in the starting lineup, as he concluded the 2013–14 season with 24 matches and 4 goals.

After Vitez, Dedić spent two years playing at Čelik Zenica from 2014 to 2016. In 2016 he came back to Vitez, where he stayed until 2017.

=== Teuta Durrës ===
On 15 July 2017, Dedić moved for the first time aboard by joining Albanian Superliga club Teuta Durrës on a one-year contract. Then he flew in Italy to join the team during their summer preparation phase. He took squad number 8, and made his first Albanian Superliga appearance on 9 September 2017, in matchday 1 against Luftëtari Gjirokastër. Dedić received a straight red card during the matchday 5 tie against Partizani Tirana for hitting Renaldo Kalari with his elbow. He was suspended an initial 5 matches by Disciplinary Commission, which was later reduced to only 2, which created many controversies.

His first score-sheet contributions came in his seventh appearance where he opened the score with a header in an eventual 1–2 defeat against Lushnja. Later on 15 November, Dedić scored a brace, including one free-kick and one penalty, as Teuta won against Luftëtari Gjirokastër to return to winning ways in the league after seven matches. It was the third consecutive match that he had scored, which earned manager Gugash Magani praise, who went on to say: "Dedić is a key player of the team."

Dedić was injured in January 2018, returning to the team only in mid-February, appearing as substitute in the 0–2 loss against fellow relegation strugglers Vllaznia Shkodër. Later on 19 March, he netted a last-minute winner with a free-kick in the 3–2 away win over bottom-side Lushnja to give Teuta three vital points, and the first win since November 2017, in their bid to escape relegation. Dedić finished the 2017–18 season by playing 29 league matches and scoring 7 goals, as Teuta was able to retain their top flight spot after a strong run in the last matches. He also played two cup games as the team was knocked-out in the quarter-finals. He left the club after his contract run out and the board decided not to offer him a renew.

=== Return to Čelik ===
On 14 June 2018, after two years, Dedić came back to Čelik and signed a two-year contract. He made his debut and scored his first goal for Čelik on 21 July 2018, in a 3–1 away loss against Krupa.

On 9 March 2019, in a 3–1 home win against GOŠK Gabela, Dedić scored two goals in that game for Čelik in the 58th and 61st minute. He was left go by the club on 21 January 2020.

=== Mladost Doboj Kakanj ===
Shortly after leaving Čelik, Dedić signed a two-and-a-half-year contract with Mladost Doboj Kakanj on 27 January 2020. He made his official debut for Mladost in a 3–2 home loss against Široki Brijeg on 29 February 2020. Dedić scored his first goal for Mladost in a league match against Tuzla City on 15 August 2020.

== Style of play ==
Apart from his natural midfielder position, Dedić can also be deployed as playmaker or false attacking midfielder.

== Career statistics ==
=== Club ===
As of match played 10 April 2021.

Club	Season	League			Cup		Continental		Total	
Club	Season	Division	Apps	Goals	Apps	Goals	Apps	Goals	Apps	Goals
Vitez	2011–12	First League of FBiH	1	0	0	0	—		1	0
Vitez	2012–13	First League of FBiH	24	9	0	0	—		24	9
Vitez	2013–14	Bosnian Premier League	24	4	2	0	—		26	4
Vitez	Total		49	13	2	0	—		51	13
Čelik Zenica	2014–15	Bosnian Premier League	25	6	2	0	—		27	6
Čelik Zenica	2015–16	Bosnian Premier League	24	6	3	1	—		27	7
Čelik Zenica	Total		49	12	5	1	—		54	13
Vitez	2016–17	Bosnian Premier League	25	4	0	0	—		25	4
Teuta Durrës	2017–18	Albanian Superliga	29	7	2	0	—		31	7
Čelik Zenica	2018–19	Bosnian Premier League	28	7	1	0	—		29	7
Čelik Zenica	2019–20	Bosnian Premier League	14	2	1	0	—		15	2
Čelik Zenica	Total		42	9	2	0	—		44	9
Mladost Doboj Kakanj	2019–20	Bosnian Premier League	2	0	—		—		2	0
Mladost Doboj Kakanj	2020–21	Bosnian Premier League	19	3	1	0	—		20	3
Mladost Doboj Kakanj	Total		21	3	1	0	—		22	3
Career total			215	48	12	1	—		227	49

== Honours ==
Vitez

- First League FBiH: 2012–13

=== Individual ===
Awards

- First League FBiH Player of the Season: 2012–13
