= Semir Štilić =

Bosnian footballer (born 1987)

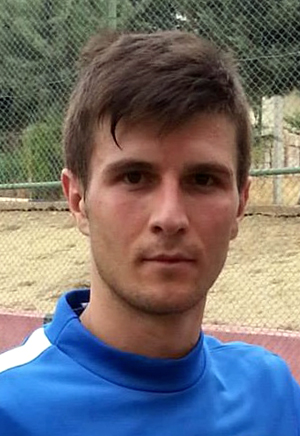
- Štilić in 2013

Personal information
- Date of birth: 8 October 1987 (age 39)
- Place of birth: Sarajevo, SFR Yugoslavia
- Height: 1.83 m (6 ft 0 in)
- Position: Attacking midfielder

Team information
- Current team: Željezničar (scout)

Youth career
- 2001–2005: Željezničar

Senior career*
Years	Team	Apps	(Gls)
2005–2008	Željezničar	49	(17)
2008–2012	Lech Poznań	106	(18)
2012–2013	Karpaty Lviv	22	(1)
2013–2014	Gaziantepspor	6	(1)
2014–2015	Wisła Kraków	52	(16)
2015–2016	APOEL	16	(3)
2017	Wisła Kraków	14	(1)
2017–2019	Wisła Płock	39	(4)
2019–2024	Željezničar	104	(25)
Total		408	(86)

International career
2007–2008	Bosnia and Herzegovina U21	8	(1)
2007	Bosnia and Herzegovina Olympic	1	(0)
2008–2015	Bosnia and Herzegovina	7	(0)
- * Club domestic league appearances and goals

Semir Štilić (born 8 October 1987) is a Bosnian former professional footballer who played as an attacking midfielder. Besides his homeland, he also played in Poland, Ukraine, Turkey and Cyprus.

A former youth international for Bosnia and Herzegovina national team, Štilić made his senior international debut in 2008, earning 7 caps until 2015.

== Club career ==
=== Early career ===
Born in Sarajevo, Štilić began his playing career with hometown club Željezničar in 2005. After three seasons with Željezničar, he moved abroad for the first time in his career, signing a 4-year contract with Polish club Lech Poznań in June 2008.

On 23 July 2012, Štilić joined Karpaty Lviv, He stayed in Ukraine for only one season, as he left for Turkish club Gaziantepspor in August 2013.

On 23 January 2014, Štilić went back to Poland and signed one-and-a-half-year deal with Wisła Kraków.

=== APOEL ===
On 13 June 2015, Štilić signed a three-year contract with Cypriot First Division club APOEL. He made his APOEL debut on 21 July 2015, in his team's 1–1 away draw against Vardar in the second qualifying round of the UEFA Champions League. He scored his first goal for APOEL on 22 August 2015, in his team's 5–1 away victory over Ermis Aradippou in a league match. On 26 August 2015, Štilić scored from a long-range free kick against Astana at the GSP Stadium, in APOEL's 1–1 draw in the play-off round of the 2015–16 UEFA Champions League.

On 19 September 2016, his contract with APOEL was mutually terminated.

=== Wisła Płock ===
On 4 September 2017, Štilić moved from Wisła Kraków to Ekstraklasa club Wisła Płock. In May 2019, almost two years after signing with Wisła Płock, he decided to leave the club.

=== Return to Željezničar ===
On 2 August 2019, eleven years after leaving the club, Štilić returned to Željezničar, signing a three-year contract. His first match back at Željezničar was a 5–2 home league, Sarajevo derby win against Sarajevo on 31 August 2019. Štilić scored his first goal since his return to Željezničar on 25 September 2019, in a 6–0 home league win against Zvijezda 09. He was named man of the match in Željezničar's 3–1 away league win against Sarajevo in the derby on 30 November 2019, scoring two goals and earning an assist.

Štilić scored his first goal for the club in the 2020–21 season on 7 August 2020 in a league win against Radnik Bijeljina. He scored his first goal of the 2021–22 season against Posušje on 3 April 2022. On 15 June 2023, he extended his contract with Željezničar until June 2024.

Štilić left the club after the end of the 2023–24 season and announced his retirement from professional football following his contract expiration.

== International career ==
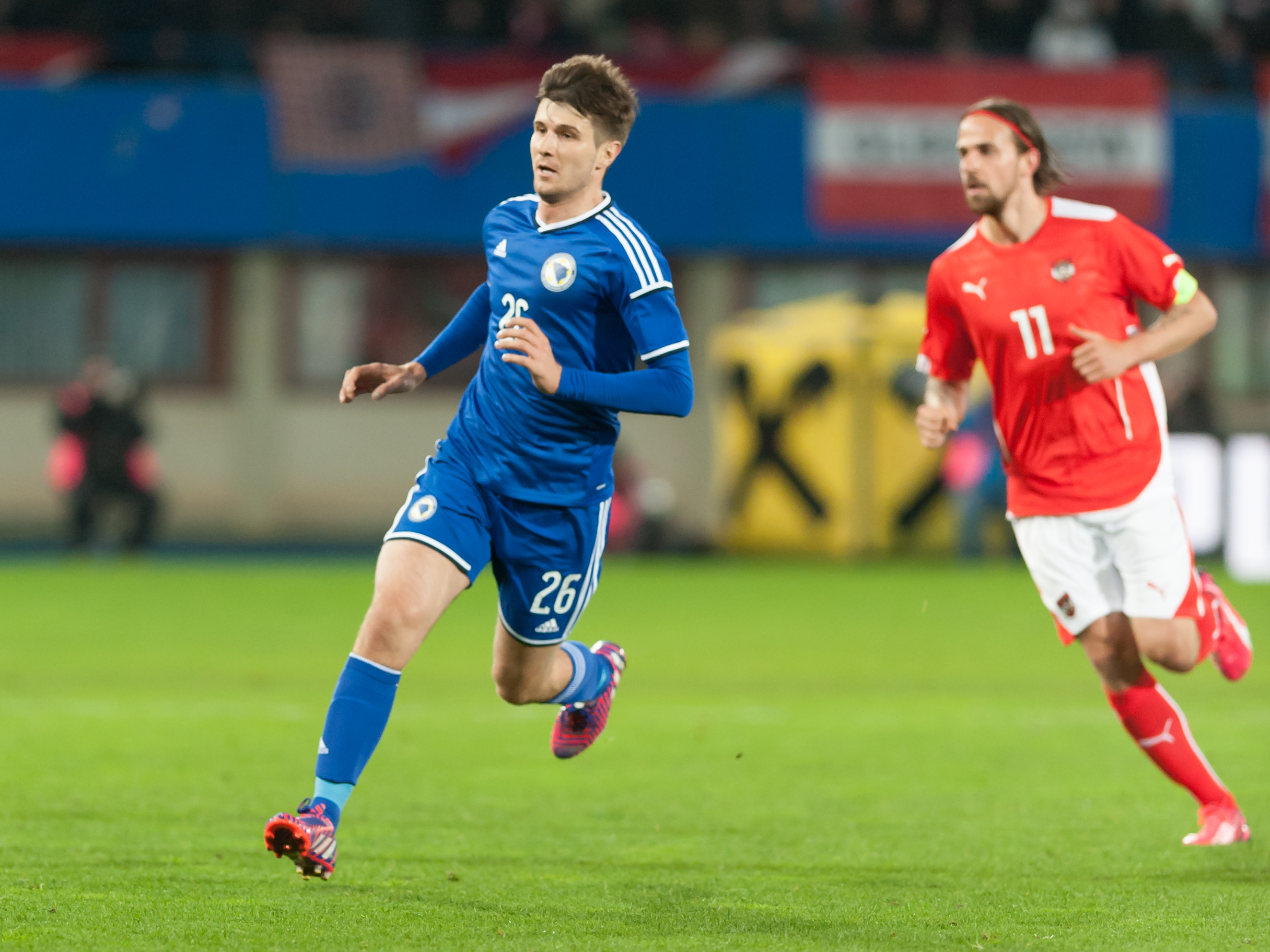
Štilić playing for Bosnia and Herzegovina in 2015

Štilić represented the Bosnia and Herzegovina U21 national team eight times, scoring one goal. On 15 December 2007, he represented the Bosnia and Herzegovina Olympic team, coming on as an 89th-minute substitute in the country's 0–1 friendly defeat to Poland.

Štilić made his senior international debut for Bosnia and Herzegovina on 30 January 2008, in a friendly game against Japan, coming on as an 83rd-minute substitute in 0–3 away defeat.

== Post-playing career ==
On 14 August 2024, Željezničar announced the hiring of Štilić as a new scout for the club.

== Personal life ==
Semir is the son of former footballer and current football manager Ismet Štilić.

== Career statistics ==
=== Club ===
Appearances and goals by club, season and competition
Club	Season	League			National cup (Note: Includes Bosnia and Herzegovina Cup, Polish Cup, Ukrainian Cup, Turkish Cup, Cypriot Cup)		Continental		Other		Total	
Club	Season	Division	Apps	Goals	Apps	Goals	Apps	Goals	Apps	Goals	Apps	Goals
Željezničar	2004–05	Bosnian Premier League	1	0	—		—		—		1	0
Željezničar	2005–06	Bosnian Premier League	6	0	3	0	—		—		9	0
Željezničar	2006–07	Bosnian Premier League	17	7	3	0	—		—		20	7
Željezničar	2007–08	Bosnian Premier League	25	10	6	2	—		—		31	12
Željezničar	Total		49	17	12	2	—		—		61	19
Lech Poznań	2008–09	Ekstraklasa	29	9	7	3	12 (Note: Appearances in UEFA Cup)	3	1 (Note: Appearance in Ekstraklasa Cup)	0	49	15
Lech Poznań	2009–10	Ekstraklasa	26	2	1	0	4 (Note: Appearance(s) in UEFA Europa League)	0	1 (Note: Appearance in Polish Super Cup)	0	32	2
Lech Poznań	2010–11	Ekstraklasa	28	6	6	2	14 (Note: Four appearances in UEFA Champions League, ten appearances and one goal in UEFA Europa League)	1	1	0	49	9
Lech Poznań	2011–12	Ekstraklasa	23	1	4	1	—		—		27	2
Lech Poznań	Total		106	18	18	6	30	4	3	0	157	28
Karpaty Lviv	2012–13	Ukrainian Premier League	22	1	2	2	—		—		24	3
Gaziantepspor	2013–14	Süper Lig	6	1	2	3	—		—		8	4
Wisła Kraków	2013–14	Ekstraklasa	16	7	0	0	—		—		16	7
Wisła Kraków	2014–15	Ekstraklasa	36	9	0	0	—		—		36	9
Wisła Kraków	Total		52	16	0	0	—		—		52	16
APOEL	2015–16	Cypriot First Division	16	3	6	0	8 (Note: Three appearances and one goal in UEFA Champions League, five appearances in UEFA Europa League)	1	1 (Note: Appearance in Cypriot Super Cup)	0	31	4
Wisła Kraków	2016–17	Ekstraklasa	14	1	0	0	—		—		14	1
Wisła Płock	2017–18	Ekstraklasa	27	4	0	0	—		—		27	4
Wisła Płock	2018–19	Ekstraklasa	12	0	3	2	—		—		15	2
Wisła Płock	Total		39	4	3	2	0	0	0	0	42	6
Željezničar	2019–20	Bosnian Premier League	14	8	3	1	—		—		17	9
Željezničar	2020–21	Bosnian Premier League	26	8	3	1	1	0	—		30	9
Željezničar	2021–22	Bosnian Premier League	12	1	0	0	—		—		12	1
Željezničar	2022–23	Bosnian Premier League	30	6	6	3	—		—		36	9
Željezničar	2023–24	Bosnian Premier League	22	2	1	0	1 (Note: Appearance in UEFA Europa Conference League)	0	—		24	2
Željezničar	Total		104	25	13	5	2	0	—		119	30
Career total			408	86	56	20	40	5	4	0	508	111

=== International ===
Appearances and goals by national team and year
National team	Year	Apps	Goals
Bosnia and Herzegovina
Bosnia and Herzegovina	2008	1	0
Bosnia and Herzegovina	2009	1	0
Bosnia and Herzegovina	2010	1	0
Bosnia and Herzegovina	2011	3	0
Bosnia and Herzegovina	2015	1	0
Total		7	0

== Honours ==
Lech Poznań

- Ekstraklasa: 2009–10
- Polish Cup: 2008–09
- Polish Super Cup: 2009

APOEL

- Cypriot First Division: 2015–16

Individual

- Ekstraklasa Midfielder of the Season: 2014–15
- Ekstraklasa Player of the Month: August 2014
- Lech Poznań All-time XI
- Piłka Nożna Foreigner of the Year: 2008
