= Vedran Vrhovac =

Bosnian footballer

Personal information
- Date of birth: 20 November 1998 (age 27)
- Place of birth: Busovača, Bosnia and Herzegovina
- Height: 1.87 m (6 ft 2 in)
- Position: Centre-back

Team information
- Current team: SC Kalsdorf
- Number: 3

Youth career
- –2016: Vitez

Senior career*
Years	Team	Apps	(Gls)
2016–2017	Vitez	16	(0)
2017–2018	Novigrad	10	(0)
2018	Vitez	12	(0)
2018–2020	Čelik Zenica	44	(2)
2020–2022	Željezničar Sarajevo	26	(2)
2022	Petrolul Ploiești	2	(0)
2022–2023	Radomlje	20	(0)
2024–	SC Kalsdorf	56	(7)

International career
2019	Bosnia and Herzegovina U21	1	(0)
- * Club domestic league appearances and goals as of 27 June 2026

Vedran Vrhovac (born 20 November 1998) is a Bosnian professional footballer who plays as a centre-back for Austrian Regionalliga club SC Kalsdorf.

== Club career ==
On 14 February 2024, Vrhovac joined SC Kalsdorf.
