= Ismet Štilić =

Bosnian footballer and manager (born 1960)

Personal information
- Date of birth: 31 July 1960 (age 66)
- Place of birth: Tuzla, SFR Yugoslavia
- Height: 1.78 m (5 ft 10 in)
- Position: Midfielder

Youth career
- –1981: Sloboda Tuzla

Senior career*
Years	Team	Apps	(Gls)
1981–1984	Sloboda Tuzla	32	(0)
1985	Rudar Prijedor	17	(6)
1985–1987	Novi Sad	27	(1)
1987–1991	Željezničar	71	(3)
1991–1992	União	17	(0)
1992–1994	Leça	61	(12)
1994–1995	Dragões Sandinenses	31	(2)
Total		256	(24)

Managerial career
- 2004: Željezničar (caretaker)
- * Club domestic league appearances and goals

Ismet Štilić (born 31 July 1960) is a Bosnian professional football manager and former player.

== Playing career ==
Štilić began his 14-year professional career with hometown club Sloboda Tuzla, making his debut with the first team in 1981. He also played one season for Rudar Prijedor and two for Novi Sad before making a move to Željezničar.

After four years at Željezničar, Štilić moved abroad, where he remained until his retirement. He started with Portuguese club União, appearing in only 17 games in one 1/2 Primeira Liga seasons combined, then scoring 10 goals with Leça as the club got promoted from the Portuguese Second Division. He returned to the Second Division in 1994, appearing for Dragões Sandinenses, after which he retired at the age of 35.

== Managerial career ==
Štilić began working as a manager with former club Željezničar, first with the youth sides then as an assistant to Jiří Plíšek. In late October 2004, Plíšek was sacked and Štilić was appointed as his replacement, going on to act as caretaker for several matches, and eventually returning to the youth team.

On 29 October 2018, Štilić was once again named the assistant manager at Željezničar. He left Željezničar on 31 December 2018.

== Personal life ==
Štilić's son, Semir, is also a professional footballer and a midfielder who currently plays for Željezničar. He also played at Polish club Lech Poznań for several seasons, as well as the Bosnia and Herzegovina national team.
