= Dino Ćorić =

Bosnian footballer

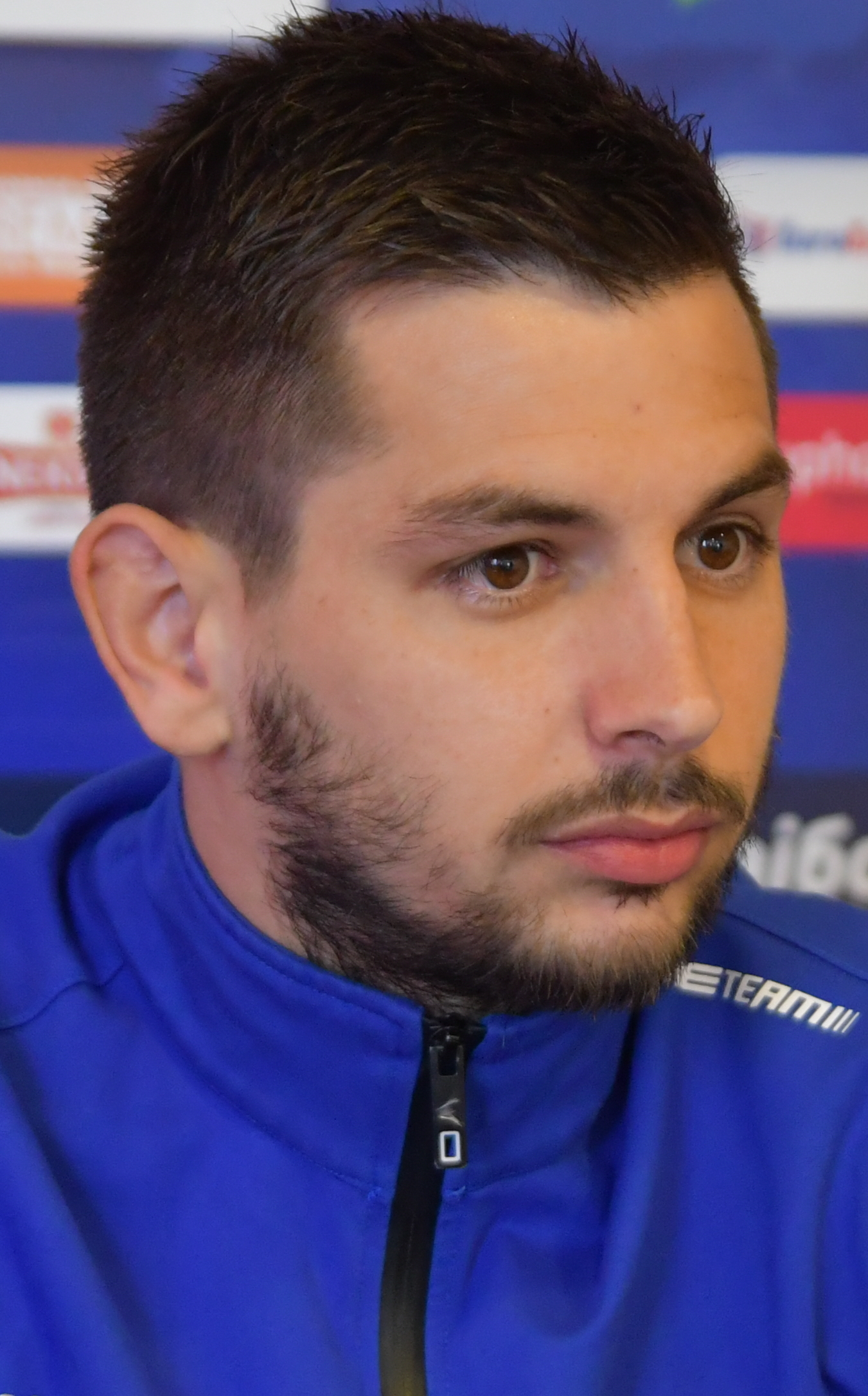
- Ćorić with Borac Banja Luka in 2021

Personal information
- Full name: Dino Ćorić
- Date of birth: 30 June 1990 (age 36)
- Place of birth: Široki Brijeg, SFR Yugoslavia
- Positions: Defender; midfielder

Youth career
- –2009: Široki Brijeg

Senior career*
Years	Team	Apps	(Gls)
2009–2021	Široki Brijeg	228	(28)
2009	→ Posušje (loan)		
2021–2023	Borac Banja Luka	56	(0)
2023	Tuzla City	21	(0)
2024–2025	Široki Brijeg	7	(0)
Total		312	(28)

International career
2010	Bosnia and Herzegovina U21	0	(0)
- * Club domestic league appearances and goals

Dino Ćorić (born 30 June 1990) is a former Bosnian professional footballer who played as a defender or as a midfielder.

== Honours ==
Široki Brijeg

- Bosnian Cup: 2012–13, 2016–17

Borac Banja Luka

- Bosnian Premier League: 2020–21
