= Darick Kobie Morris =

Professional footballer (born 1995)

Personal information
- Date of birth: 15 July 1995 (age 31)
- Place of birth: Syracuse, New York, United States
- Height: 1.86 m (6 ft 1 in)
- Position: Centre-back

Team information
- Current team: Zrinjski Mostar
- Number: 37

Youth career
- 2004–2013: Zagreb
- 2013–2014: Dinamo Zagreb

Senior career*
Years	Team	Apps	(Gls)
2014–2018	Dinamo Zagreb II	85	(0)
2015–2018	Dinamo Zagreb	2	(0)
2018–2019	Domžale	6	(0)
2019–2022	Tuzla City	61	(1)
2022–2024	Mura	39	(3)
2024–2025	Meizhou Hakka	48	(1)
2026–	Zrinjski Mostar	4	(0)

International career^{‡}
2011	Croatia U17	3	(0)
2013–2014	Croatia U19	7	(0)
2015	Croatia U20	1	(0)
2015	Croatia U21	1	(0)
- * Club domestic league appearances and goals as of 11 June 2026 ‡ National team caps and goals as of 23 April 2015

Darick Kobie Morris (born 15 July 1995) is a professional footballer who plays as a centre-back for Bosnian Premier League club Zrinjski Mostar. Born in the United States, he played for Croatia's youth teams.

== Club career ==
=== Early career ===
Born in Syracuse, New York to an African-American father and a Croatian mother, Morris moved to Zagreb, Croatia when he was less than a year old. Initially a right winger, he subsequently moved to right-back and then centre-back in the NK Zagreb academy, where he spent almost his entire youth career.

=== Dinamo Zagreb ===
In 2013, as a former Croatia U17 international, he moved to the Dinamo Zagreb Academy. In 2014, he became a regular in Dinamo's reserve team, a position he would hold for four subsequent seasons, mainly in the Druga HNL. Morris made his first-team debut in 2015, in the 7–1 cup win against Oštrc Zlatar, scoring in the process.

The same year, on 25 September, he made his Prva HNL debut as well, coming in for Josip Pivarić in the second half of a 4–1 home win against Osijek. He would go on to make just one further top-tier appearance for the club, in a 1–0 win against Lokomotiva in September 2016.

=== Domžale ===
In June 2018, Morris signed a three-year contract with Slovenian PrvaLiga club Domžale. He made his debut for Domžale on 5 August 2018, in a 5–1 away loss against Mura. Morris left the club in June 2019.

=== Tuzla City ===
On 14 June 2019, Morris signed a two-year contract with Bosnian Premier League club Tuzla City. He made his debut on 20 July 2019, in a 5–1 away league win against Zvijezda 09.

=== Meizhou Hakka ===
On 4 January 2024, it was announced that Morris had terminated his contract with Mura by mutual consent and had signed for Chinese Super League club Meizhou Hakka.

== International career ==
Morris represented Croatia at various youth levels. He played for the under-17, under-19, under-20, and under-21 national teams. He never represented Croatia's senior team, or the United States at any levels.

== Career statistics ==
As of match played 23 July 2026

Club	Season	League			National cup (Note: Includes Croatian Cup, Slovenian Cup, Bosnian Cup)		Continental		Other		Total	
Club	Season	Division	Apps	Goals	Apps	Goals	Apps	Goals	Apps	Goals	Apps	Goals
Dinamo Zagreb	2015–16	Prva HNL	1	0	1	1	0	0	—		2	1
Dinamo Zagreb	2016–17	Prva HNL	1	0	2	1	0	0	—		3	1
Dinamo Zagreb	2017–18	Prva HNL	0	0	0	0	0	0	—		0	0
Dinamo Zagreb	Total		2	0	3	2	0	0	—		5	2
Domžale	2018–19	Slovenian PrvaLiga	6	0	0	0	0	0	—		6	0
Tuzla City	2019–20	Bosnian Premier League	9	0	1	0	—		—		10	0
Tuzla City	2020–21	Bosnian Premier League	28	0	5	0	—		—		33	0
Tuzla City	2021–22	Bosnian Premier League	24	1	5	0	—		—		29	1
Tuzla City	Total		61	1	11	0	—		—		72	1
Mura	2022–23	Slovenian PrvaLiga	24	3	0	0	4 (Note: Appearances in UEFA Europa Conference League)	0	—		28	3
Mura	2023–24	Slovenian PrvaLiga	15	0	0	0	—		—		15	0
Mura	Total		39	3	0	0	4	0	—		43	3
Meizhou Hakka	2024	Chinese Super League	24	0	0	0	—		—		24	0
Meizhou Hakka	2025	Chinese Super League	24	1	0	0	—		—		24	1
Meizhou Hakka	Total		48	1	0	0	—		—		48	1
Zrinjski Mostar	2025–26	Bosnian Premier League	4	0	4	0	—		1 (Note: Appearance in Bosnian Supercup)	0	9	0
Zrinjski Mostar	2026–27	Bosnian Premier League	0	0	0	0	1	0	—		1	0
Zrinjski Mostar	Total		4	0	4	0	1	0	1	0	10	0
Career total			160	5	18	2	5	0	1	0	184	7

== Honours ==
Dinamo Zagreb

- Prva HNL: 2015–16, 2017–18
- Croatian Cup: 2015–16, 2017–18
