= Azir Muminović =

Bosnian footballer (born 1997)

Personal information
- Date of birth: 18 April 1997 (age 29)
- Place of birth: Tuzla, Bosnia and Herzegovina
- Height: 1.89 m (6 ft 2 in)
- Position: Goalkeeper

Team information
- Current team: Sloboda Tuzla
- Number: 13

Youth career
- –2016: Sloboda Tuzla

Senior career*
Years	Team	Apps	(Gls)
2016–2019	Sloboda Tuzla	36	(0)
2019–2021	Tuzla City	24	(0)
2022	Radnik Bijeljina	11	(0)
2022–2023	Rudar Pljevlja	36	(0)
2023–	Sloboda Tuzla	42	(0)

International career
2014	Bosnia and Herzegovina U17	1	(0)
2015	Bosnia and Herzegovina U19	1	(0)
2017–2018	Bosnia and Herzegovina U21	4	(0)
- * Club domestic league appearances and goals as of 12 June 2026

Azir Muminović (Bosnian pronunciation: [ǎziːr mǔminoʋitɕ]; born 18 April 1997) is a Bosnian professional footballer who plays as a goalkeeper for First League of FBiH club Sloboda Tuzla.

== Club career ==
=== Sloboda Tuzla ===
Muminović started his career with his hometown club Sloboda Tuzla, with whom he signed his first professional contract in October 2014. He made his professional debut in a cup game against Željezničar on 13 April 2016, days before his 19th birthday. His league debut came a month later, in an away loss to Zrinjski Mostar.

In July 2018, during a pre-season training, Muminović tore an anterior cruciate ligament of his right knee, which required surgery and ruled him out for at least six months. In his come-back game with Sloboda, on 30 March 2019, the club drew against city rivals Tuzla City 1–1 in a league game.

=== Tuzla City ===
In June 2019, Muminović signed a four-year contract with Tuzla City for a €25,000 transfer fee. He made his official debut for Tuzla City on 20 July 2019, in a 1–5 away league win against Zvijezda 09. He surprisingly terminated his contract with the club on 23 April 2021.

== International career ==
Muminović came through all of Bosnia and Herzegovina's youth selections.

== Career statistics ==
=== Club ===
As of match played 4 May 2025

Club	Season	League			Cup		Continental		Total	
Club	Season	Division	Apps	Goals	Apps	Goals	Apps	Goals	Apps	Goals
Sloboda Tuzla	2015–16	Bosnian Premier League	1	0	1	0	—		2	0
Sloboda Tuzla	2016–17	Bosnian Premier League	4	0	0	0	0	0	4	0
Sloboda Tuzla	2017–18	Bosnian Premier League	24	0	2	0	—		26	0
Sloboda Tuzla	2018–19	Bosnian Premier League	7	0	0	0	—		7	0
Sloboda Tuzla	Total		36	0	3	0	0	0	39	0
Tuzla City	2019–20	Bosnian Premier League	10	0	2	0	—		12	0
Tuzla City	2020–21	Bosnian Premier League	14	0	3	0	—		17	0
Tuzla City	Total		24	0	5	0	—		29	0
Radnik Bijeljina	2021–22	Bosnian Premier League	11	0	—		—		11	0
Rudar Pljevlja	2022–23	Montenegrin First League	36	0	2	0	—		38	0
Sloboda Tuzla	2023–24	First League of FBiH	23	0	2	0	—		25	0
Sloboda Tuzla	2024–25	Bosnian Premier League	11	0	0	0	—		11	0
Sloboda Tuzla	2025–26	First League of FBiH	0	0	0	0	—		0	0
Sloboda Tuzla	Total		34	0	2	0	—		36	0
Career total			141	0	12	0	0	0	153	0
