= Aleksandar Kosorić =

Bosnian footballer (born 1987)

Personal information
- Date of birth: 30 January 1987 (age 39)
- Place of birth: Pale, SFR Yugoslavia
- Height: 1.91 m (6 ft 3 in)
- Position: Centre-back

Youth career
- 1994–2003: Romanija Pale
- 2003–2004: Slavija Sarajevo

Senior career*
Years	Team	Apps	(Gls)
2004–2008	Slavija Sarajevo	48	(1)
2009	Partizan	2	(0)
2010–2011	Rad	20	(0)
2011–2012	Radnički 1923	19	(0)
2013	Erbil	35	(1)
2014	Radnički Niš	6	(0)
2014–2016	Željezničar	68	(1)
2017	Radnik Bijeljina	14	(0)
2017–2018	Spartaks Jūrmala	37	(1)
2019–2020	Balzan	22	(2)
2020–2023	Željezničar	92	(1)
2024–2025	Romanija Pale	29	(2)
Total		392	(9)

International career
2008	Bosnia and Herzegovina U21	6	(1)
2016	Bosnia and Herzegovina	1	(0)
- * Club domestic league appearances and goals

Aleksandar Kosorić (Serbian Cyrillic: Александар Kocopић; born 30 January 1987) is a Bosnian former professional footballer who played as a centre-back.

== Club career ==
Kosorić played for Slavija Sarajevo from 2004 to 2008. In January 2009, he moved to Serbian SuperLiga club Partizan after being noticed during a friendly game played between Partizan and Slavija in the summer of 2008. After not getting many chances there, he moved in January 2010 to another Belgrade club, Rad.

During the winter break of the 2011–12 season, Kosorić moved to Radnički 1923. A year later he would leave Serbia and move to Iraq to join Erbil playing in the Iraqi Premier League. After Iraq, he returned to Serbia and played the second half of the 2013–14 season with Radnički Niš.

In the summer of 2014, Kosorić joined Bosnian Premier League club Željezničar and played for the next two and half years at the Sarajevo-based club. While playing at Željezničar, Kosorić became the team captain and received a call for the national team. He left Željezničar in December 2016.

After Željezničar, Kosorić played for Radnik Bijeljina in 2017 and for Spartaks Jūrmala from 2017 to 2018 with whom he won the Latvian Championship in 2017. On 10 November 2018, Kosorić left Spartaks.

On 3 January 2019, Kosorić signed with Maltese Premier League club Balzan. He won his first trophy with Balzan on 18 May 2019, the 2018–19 Maltese FA Trophy after beating Valletta in the final. He decided to terminate his contract and leave the club in January 2020.

On 30 January 2020, Kosorić came back to Željezničar, signing a two-and-a-half-year contract with the club. On 17 October 2020, in a league win against Olimpik, he made his 100th appearance for Željezničar. In December 2023, Kosorić announced his decision to retire from football. He played his last game for Željezničar against GOŠK Gabela on 16 December.

In January 2024, Kosorić decided to continue his career, joining First League of RS club Romanija Pale. He announced his second and final retirement from professional football at the end of the 2024–25 season.

== International career ==
Kosorić made his only Bosnia and Herzegovina national team appearance in the final of the 2016 Kirin Cup against Japan as a 90th-minute substitute.

== Honours ==
Partizan

- Serbian SuperLiga: 2008–09, 2009–10
- Serbian Cup: 2008–09

Spartaks Jūrmala

- Latvian Higher League: 2017

Balzan

- Maltese FA Trophy: 2018–19

Bosnia and Herzegovina

- Kirin Cup: 2016
