= Saša Maksimović (footballer) =

Bosnian footballer

Personal information
- Date of birth: 18 December 1999 (age 26)
- Place of birth: Brčko, Bosnia and Herzegovina
- Height: 1.75 m (5 ft 9 in)
- Position: Midfielder

Team information
- Current team: VfR Aalen
- Number: 7

Youth career
- –2017: Borac Šamac
- 2017–2018: Sloboda Tuzla

Senior career*
Years	Team	Apps	(Gls)
2016	Borac Šamac	16	(0)
2018–2023	Sloboda Tuzla	111	(10)
2019	→ Zvijezda Gradačac (loan)	13	(2)
2023–2024	TSV 1861 Nördlingen	27	(13)
2024–	VfR Aalen	72	(24)

International career^{‡}
2017	Bosnia and Herzegovina U19	4	(0)
2021–	Bosnia and Herzegovina	1	(0)
- * Club domestic league appearances and goals as of 24 September 2026 ‡ National team caps and goals as of 19 December 2021

Saša Maksimović (born 18 December 1999) is a Bosnian professional footballer who plays as a midfielder for German Regionalliga Südwest club VfR Aalen.

He started his career at Borac Šamac, before joining the youth team of Sloboda in 2017. In 2018, Maksimović was promoted to the Sloboda first team, after which he was sent on loan to Zvijezda Gradačac in January 2019. He came back to Sloboda when his loan ended.

== Club career ==
=== Early career ===
A product of the Borac Šamac academy, Maksimović made a move to the Sloboda Tuzla academy in February 2017. He made his professional debut for Sloboda on 12 May 2018, playing 9 minutes in a Bosnian Premier League match against Mladost Doboj Kakanj, scoring his first goal for the club. He was then loaned out to First League of FBiH club Zvijezda Gradačac on 25 January 2019. On 11 June 2020, Maksimović returned from his loan to the club and also extended his contract until June 2021 with Sloboda.

== International career ==
Maksimović represented both the Bosnia and Herzegovina U19 and U21 national teams.

== Career statistics ==
=== Club ===
As of match played 3 April 2021.

Club	Season	League			Cup		Continental		Total	
Club	Season	Division	Apps	Goals	Apps	Goals	Apps	Goals	Apps	Goals
Borac Šamac	2016–17	First League of RS	16	0	—		—		16	0
Sloboda Tuzla	2017–18	Bosnian Premier League	1	1	0	0	–		1	1
Sloboda Tuzla	2018–19	Bosnian Premier League	0	0	1	0	–		1	0
Sloboda Tuzla	2019–20	Bosnian Premier League	19	3	0	0	–		19	3
Sloboda Tuzla	2020–21	Bosnian Premier League	20	2	0	0	–		20	2
Sloboda Tuzla	Total		40	6	1	0	—		41	6
Zvijezda Gradačac (loan)	2018–19	First League of FBiH	13	2	–		–		13	2
Career total			65	7	1	0	–		66	7

=== International ===
As of match played 18 December 2021

National team	Year	Apps	Goals
Bosnia and Herzegovina
Bosnia and Herzegovina	2021	1	0
Total		1	0
