= Mustafa Mujezinović (footballer) =

Bosnian association football player

Personal information
- Date of birth: 6 May 1993 (age 33)
- Place of birth: Weilburg, Germany
- Height: 1.72 m (5 ft 8 in)
- Position: Winger

Team information
- Current team: Vardar
- Number: 13

Youth career
- Novi Grad
- –2012: Olimpik

Senior career*
Years	Team	Apps	(Gls)
2012–2013	→ Bosna Visoko (loan)	6	(0)
2013–2014	Olimpik	8	(0)
2014–2015	Westfalia Wethmar		
2015	Igman Konjic	14	(1)
2015–2017	Bosna Visoko	60	(3)
2017–2019	Velež Mostar	59	(10)
2019–2022	Željezničar	74	(6)
2022–2023	Novi Pazar	27	(3)
2023	Shkëndija	11	(1)
2023	Gostivari	6	(0)
2023–	Vardar	11	(0)
- * Club domestic league appearances and goals as of 26 May 2024

Mustafa Mujezinović (born 6 May 1993) is a Bosnian professional footballer who plays as a winger. He plays for Vardar in the Macedonian First Football League.
