= 2016–17 FK Željezničar season =

Football club season

Željezničar
2016–17 season
- Chairman: Vedran Vukotić
- Manager: Miloš Kostić (until 22 August) Slavko Petrović (from 23 August)
- Stadium: Grbavica Stadium
- Premijer Liga BiH: 2nd
- Kup BiH: Semi-finals
- Top goalscorer: League: Ivan Lendrić (19); All: Ivan Lendrić (20)
- Highest home attendance: 13,500 vs Sarajevo; Sloboda Tuzla
- Lowest home attendance: 1,700 vs Goražde

In the 2016–17 season, the Bosnian football club FK Željezničar Sarajevo achieved second place in the Premier League of Bosnia and Herzegovina and reached the semi-finals of the Bosnia and Herzegovina Football Cup.

== Squad statistics ==
=== Players ===
N	Pos.	Nat.	Name	Age	EU	Since	App	Goals	Ends	Transfer fee	Notes
1	GK	(Bosnia and Herzegovina)	Irfan Fejzić	39	Non-EU	2016	9	0	2018	Free	
2	DF	(Serbia)	Siniša Stevanović	36	Non-EU	2016	44	0	2018	Free	
3	DF	(Bosnia and Herzegovina)	Amar Beširević	26	Non-EU	2016	2	0	2019	Youth system	
4	DF	(Italy)	Matteo Boccaccini	32	EU	2016	22	1	2017	Free	On loan from Brescia
7	MF	(Croatia)	Ivan Crnov	35	EU	2017	9	1	2018	Free	Second nationality: BiH
8	MF	(Montenegro)	Darko Marković	38	Non-EU	2016	28	4	2018	Free	
10	MF	(Bosnia and Herzegovina)	Samir Bekrić	41	Non-EU	2016	194	44	2019	Free	
11	MF	(Serbia)	Jovan Blagojević	37	Non-EU	2015	72	2	2018	Free	
12	GK	(Bosnia and Herzegovina)	Adnan Bobić	38	Non-EU	2017	0	0	2019	Free	
13	GK	(Bosnia and Herzegovina)	Vedran Kjosevski	30	Non-EU	2013	56	0	2018	Youth system	Second nationality: Macedonia
14	MF	(Bosnia and Herzegovina)	Dino Hasanović	29	Non-EU	2015	16	0	2018	Youth system	
15	DF	(Bosnia and Herzegovina)	Jadranko Bogičević	42	Non-EU	2016	140	7	2018	Free	
16	DF	(Bosnia and Herzegovina)	Srđan Stanić	36	EU	2016	230	11	2018	Free	Second nationality: Croatia
17	MF	(Bosnia and Herzegovina)	Goran Zakarić	33	Non-EU	2017	17	2	2019	Free	
18	DF	(Croatia)	Danijel Stojanović	41	EU	2017	8	0	2019	Free	Second nationality: BiH
19	DF	(Bosnia and Herzegovina)	Semir Kerla	38	Non-EU	2017	119	9	2017	Free	
20	MF	(Bosnia and Herzegovina)	Zajko Zeba	42	Non-EU	2017	127	37	2018	Free	Originally from youth system
21	FW	(Bosnia and Herzegovina)	Dženis Beganović	29	Non-EU	2014	47	9	2019	Youth system	On loan to Metalleghe-BSI
22	DF	(Nigeria)	Musa Muhammed	29	Non-EU	2017	9	0	2017	Free	On loan from İstanbul Başakşehir
23	FW	(Bosnia and Herzegovina)	Stevo Nikolić	41	Non-EU	2016	27	6	2018	Free	Second nationality: Serbia
24	FW	(Croatia)	Ivan Lendrić	34	EU	2016	50	29	2018	Free	Second nationality: BiH
25	MF	(Serbia)	Uglješa Radinović	32	Non-EU	2016	26	0	2018	Free	Second nationality: BiH
27	DF	(Bosnia and Herzegovina)	Kemal Osmanković	28	Non-EU	2014	5	0	2019	Youth system	
30	GK	(Bosnia and Herzegovina)	Aldin Ćeman	30	Non-EU	2014	1	0	2019	Youth system	On loan to Goražde
39	MF	(Bosnia and Herzegovina)	Denis Žerić	27	Non-EU	2015	7	1	2018	Youth system	
88	MF	(Bosnia and Herzegovina)	Miroslav Stevanović	35	Non-EU	2016	53	6	2017	Free	Second nationality: Serbia
—	MF	(Bosnia and Herzegovina)	Damir Sadiković	30	Non-EU	2013	84	8	2018	Youth system	On loan to Krško
—	DF	(Bosnia and Herzegovina)	Sanel Jahić	44	EU	2016	139	33	2018	Free	Second nationality: France
—	FW	(Bosnia and Herzegovina)	Ajdin Mujagić	27	Non-EU	2014	12	3	2017	Youth system	

- Last updated: 28 May 2017
- Source: fkzeljeznicar.ba

Total squad cost: €8.65M

==== From youth squad ====
Note: Flags indicate national team as defined under FIFA eligibility rules; some limited exceptions apply. Players may hold more than one non-FIFA nationality.

No.	Pos.	Nation	Player
—	DF	BIH	Aldin Šehić
—	DF	BIH	Amir Velić
—	DF	BIH	Haris Kurtović
—	MF	BIH	Aldin Hrvanović
—	MF	BIH	Anel Šabanadžović

No.	Pos.	Nation	Player
—	MF	BIH	Benjamin Šehić
—	MF	BIH	Kenan Delić
—	MF	BIH	Kemal Mujarić
—	MF	BIH	Meldin Jusufi
—	FW	BIH	Semir Dacić

=== Disciplinary record ===
Includes all competitive matches. The list is sorted by position, and then shirt number.

N	P	Nat.	Name	League			Cup			Europe			Others			Total			Notes
N	P	Nat.	Name	Yellow card	Second yellow card	Red card	Yellow card	Second yellow card	Red card	Yellow card	Second yellow card	Red card	Yellow card	Second yellow card	Red card	Yellow card	Second yellow card	Red card	Notes
1	GK	(Bosnia and Herzegovina)	Irfan Fejzić																
12	GK	(Bosnia and Herzegovina)	Adnan Bobić																
13	GK	(Bosnia and Herzegovina)	Vedran Kjosevski	1												1			
30	GK	(Bosnia and Herzegovina)	Aldin Ćeman																
2	DF	(Serbia)	Siniša Stevanović	11			2									13			
3	DF	(Bosnia and Herzegovina)	Amar Beširević																
4	DF	(Italy)	Matteo Boccaccini	4			1									5			
15	DF	(Bosnia and Herzegovina)	Jadranko Bogičević	3			3									6			
16	DF	(Bosnia and Herzegovina)	Srđan Stanić	4		1	3									7		1	
18	DF	(Croatia)	Danijel Stojanović	3												3			
19	DF	(Bosnia and Herzegovina)	Semir Kerla	3	1											3	1		
22	DF	(Nigeria)	Musa Muhammed	2			2									4			
27	DF	(Bosnia and Herzegovina)	Kemal Osmanković	1												1			
7	MF	(Croatia)	Ivan Crnov	1												1			
8	MF	(Montenegro)	Darko Marković	7			1									8			
10	MF	(Bosnia and Herzegovina)	Samir Bekrić	2												2			
11	MF	(Serbia)	Jovan Blagojević	3		1	1									4		1	
14	MF	(Bosnia and Herzegovina)	Dino Hasanović	1												1			
17	MF	(Bosnia and Herzegovina)	Goran Zakarić	2												2			
20	MF	(Bosnia and Herzegovina)	Zajko Zeba	1			1									2			
25	MF	(Serbia)	Uglješa Radinović	4			1									5			
39	MF	(Bosnia and Herzegovina)	Denis Žerić				1									1			
88	MF	(Bosnia and Herzegovina)	Miroslav Stevanović																
21	FW	(Bosnia and Herzegovina)	Dženis Beganović	4			1									5			
23	FW	(Bosnia and Herzegovina)	Stevo Nikolić	2			2									4			
24	FW	(Croatia)	Ivan Lendrić	1			1									2			
—	MF	(Bosnia and Herzegovina)	Damir Sadiković																
—	DF	(Bosnia and Herzegovina)	Sanel Jahić																
—	FW	(Bosnia and Herzegovina)	Ajdin Mujagić																

Last updated: 28 May 2017
Source: Competitive matches and fkzeljeznicar.ba
Ordered by (red card) , (second yellow card) and (yellow card)
(yellow card) = Number of bookings; (second yellow card) = Number of sending offs after a second yellow card; (red card) = Number of sending offs by a direct red card.

=== Goalscorers ===
No.	Pos.	Nation	Name	Premijer Liga BiH	Kup BiH	Total
24	FW	(Croatia)	Lendrić	19	1	20
23	FW	(Bosnia and Herzegovina)	Nikolić	3	3	6
10	MF	(Bosnia and Herzegovina)	Bekrić	3	3	6
80	MF	(Croatia)	Križman	4	0	4
8	MF	(Montenegro)	Marković	3	1	4
92	MF	(Bosnia and Herzegovina)	Lazić	0	3	3
88	MF	(Bosnia and Herzegovina)	M. Stevanović	2	0	2
20	MF	(Bosnia and Herzegovina)	Zeba	2	0	2
17	MF	(Bosnia and Herzegovina)	Zakarić	2	0	2
21	FW	(Bosnia and Herzegovina)	Beganović	0	2	2
4	DF	(Italy)	Boccaccini	1	0	1
7	MF	(Croatia)	Crnov	1	0	1
16	DF	(Bosnia and Herzegovina)	Stanić	1	0	1
5	DF	(Bosnia and Herzegovina)	Kosorić	0	1	1
39	MF	(Bosnia and Herzegovina)	Žerić	0	1	1
11	MF	(Serbia)	Blagojević	0	1	1
15	DF	(Bosnia and Herzegovina)	Bogičević	0	1	1
29	FW	(Bosnia and Herzegovina)	Mujagić	0	1	1
—	MF	(Bosnia and Herzegovina)	Šabanadžović	0	1	1
TOTAL				41	20	61

Last updated: 28 May 2017

=== Assists ===
No.	Pos.	Nation	Name	Premijer Liga BiH	Kup BiH	Total
88	MF	(Bosnia and Herzegovina)	M. Stevanović	11	7	18
10	MF	(Bosnia and Herzegovina)	Bekrić	2	3	5
24	FW	(Croatia)	Lendrić	2	1	3
20	MF	(Bosnia and Herzegovina)	Zeba	3	0	3
8	MF	(Montenegro)	Marković	3	0	3
6	DF	(Bosnia and Herzegovina)	Memija	0	2	2
23	FW	(Bosnia and Herzegovina)	Nikolić	2	0	2
11	MF	(Serbia)	Blagojević	1	1	2
92	MF	(Bosnia and Herzegovina)	Lazić	1	1	2
5	DF	(Bosnia and Herzegovina)	Kosorić	1	0	1
2	DF	(Serbia)	S. Stevanović	1	0	1
17	MF	(Bosnia and Herzegovina)	Zakarić	1	0	1
22	DF	(Nigeria)	Musa	1	0	1
16	DF	(Bosnia and Herzegovina)	Stanić	1	0	1
80	MF	(Croatia)	Križman	1	0	1
19	DF	(Bosnia and Herzegovina)	Kerla	1	0	1
29	FW	(Bosnia and Herzegovina)	Mujagić	0	1	1
4	DF	(Italy)	Boccaccini	0	1	1
15	DF	(Bosnia and Herzegovina)	Bogičević	0	1	1
TOTAL				32	18	50

Last updated: 20 May 2017

== Transfers ==
=== In ===
No.	Pos.	Nat.	Name	Age	EU	Moving from	Type	Transfer window	Ends	Transfer fee	Source
23	MF	(Bosnia and Herzegovina)	Amer Hiroš	29	Non-EU	Goražde	Loan return	Summer	2016	N/A	
32	MF	(Bosnia and Herzegovina)	Muris Midžić	29	Non-EU	Goražde	Loan return	Summer	2018	N/A	
33	MF	(Bosnia and Herzegovina)	Edin Hadžović	30	Non-EU	Goražde	Loan return	Summer	2018	N/A	
35	MF	(Bosnia and Herzegovina)	Adnan Alihodžić	29	Non-EU	Bratstvo Gračanica	Loan return	Summer	2018	N/A	
36	MF	(Bosnia and Herzegovina)	Benjamin Šehić	29	Non-EU	Bratstvo Gračanica	Loan return	Summer	2018	N/A	
31	FW	(Bosnia and Herzegovina)	Denis Pozder	36	EU	Den Bosch (Netherlands)	Sign	Summer	2018	Free	fkzeljeznicar.ba
70	DF	(Bosnia and Herzegovina)	Senad Husić	35	Non-EU	Diósgyőr (Hungary)	Sign	Summer	2019	Free	fkzeljeznicar.ba
8	MF	(Spain)	Javi Hervás	36	EU	Brisbane Roar (Australia)	Sign	Summer	2018	Free	fkzeljeznicar.ba
22	MF	(Bosnia and Herzegovina)	Adnan Šećerović	34	Non-EU	Radnik	Sign	Summer	2018	Free	fkzeljeznicar.ba
25	MF	(Serbia)	Uglješa Radinović	32	Non-EU	Borac Banja Luka	Sign	Summer	2018	Free	fkzeljeznicar.ba
92	MF	(Bosnia and Herzegovina)	Milivoje Lazić	33	Non-EU	Radnik	Sign	Summer	2019	Free	fkzeljeznicar.ba
33	MF	(Greece)	Dimitris Toskas	34	EU	Lamia (Greece)	Sign	Summer	2018	Free	fkzeljeznicar.ba
14	DF	(Bosnia and Herzegovina)	Dino Bevab	32	Non-EU	NK Zagreb (Croatia)	Sign	Summer	2018	Free	fkzeljeznicar.ba
23	FW	(Bosnia and Herzegovina)	Stevo Nikolić	41	Non-EU	Zrinjski	Sign	Summer	2018	Free	fkzeljeznicar.ba
4	DF	(Italy)	Matteo Boccaccini	32	EU	Brescia (Italy)	Loan	Summer	2017	Free	
7	DF	(Bosnia and Herzegovina)	Sanel Jahić	44	EU	Levadiakos (Greece)	Sign	Summer	2018	Free	fkzeljeznicar.ba
8	MF	(Montenegro)	Darko Marković	38	Non-EU	Zeta (Montenegro)	Sign	Summer	2018	Free	fkzeljeznicar.ba
80	MF	(Croatia)	Sandi Križman	36	EU	Slaven Belupo (Croatia)	Sign	Summer	2018	Free	fkzeljeznicar.ba
40	GK	(Bosnia and Herzegovina)	Emir Ćutahija	28	Non-EU	Velež	Loan return	Summer	2018	N/A	
14	MF	(Bosnia and Herzegovina)	Dino Hasanović	29	Non-EU	Čelik	Loan return	Winter	2018	N/A	
20	MF	(Bosnia and Herzegovina)	Zajko Zeba	42	Non-EU	Sloboda Tuzla	Sign	Winter	2018	Free	fkzeljeznicar.ba
12	GK	(Bosnia and Herzegovina)	Adnan Bobić	38	Non-EU	Sloboda Tuzla	Sign	Winter	2019	Free	fkzeljeznicar.ba
17	MF	(Bosnia and Herzegovina)	Goran Zakarić	33	Non-EU	Dinamo Zagreb (Croatia)	Sign	Winter	2019	Free	fkzeljeznicar.ba
7	MF	(Croatia)	Ivan Crnov	35	EU	Široki Brijeg	Sign	Winter	2018	Free	fkzeljeznicar.ba
18	DF	(Croatia)	Danijel Stojanović	41	EU	Zrinjski	Sign	Winter	2018	Free	fkzeljeznicar.ba
22	DF	(Nigeria)	Musa Muhammed	29	Non-EU	İstanbul Başakşehir (Turkey)	Loan	Winter	2017	Free	fkzeljeznicar.ba
19	DF	(Bosnia and Herzegovina)	Semir Kerla	38	Non-EU	Irtysh Pavlodar (Kazakhstan)	Sign	Winter	2017	Free	fkzeljeznicar.ba

Total expenditure: ▼

=== Out ===
No.	Pos.	Nat.	Name	Age	EU	Moving to	Type	Transfer window	Transfer fee	Source
8	MF	(Bosnia and Herzegovina)	Nermin Zolotić	32	Non-EU	Gent (Belgium)	Loan return	Summer	N/A	
25	FW	(Brazil)	Tiago Farias	36	Non-EU	Cibalia (Croatia)	Contract termination	Summer	Free	fkzeljeznicar.ba
90	MF	(Brazil)	Mailson	36	Non-EU	Luziânia (Brazil)	Contract termination	Summer	Free	fkzeljeznicar.ba
44	MF	(Bosnia and Herzegovina)	Adnan Zahirović	35	Non-EU	RNK Split (Croatia)	Contract termination	Summer	Free	fkzeljeznicar.ba
9	FW	(Bosnia and Herzegovina)	Nedo Turković	36	Non-EU	Olimpic	End of contract	Summer	Free	
33	DF	(Bosnia and Herzegovina)	Edin Hadžović	30	Non-EU	Famos Hrasnica	Contract termination	Summer	Free	
23	MF	(Bosnia and Herzegovina)	Amer Hiroš	29	Non-EU	Goražde	Contract termination	Summer	Free	
32	MF	(Bosnia and Herzegovina)	Muris Midžić	29	Non-EU	Goražde	Contract termination	Summer	Free	
35	DF	(Bosnia and Herzegovina)	Adnan Alihodžić	29	Non-EU	Bosna Sema	Contract termination	Summer	Free	
36	MF	(Bosnia and Herzegovina)	Benjamin Šehić	29	Non-EU	Goražde	Contract termination	Summer	Free	
37	MF	(Bosnia and Herzegovina)	Emir Hodžurda	35	Non-EU	Vitez	Contract termination	Summer	Free	fkzeljeznicar.ba
19	MF	(Bosnia and Herzegovina)	Enis Sadiković	35	Non-EU	Krupa	Contract termination	Summer	Free	fkzeljeznicar.ba
7	DF	(Croatia)	Mirko Kramarić	36	EU	Radomlje (Slovenia)	Contract termination	Summer	Free	
14	FW	(Slovenia)	Dejan Djermanović	37	EU	Zhetysu (Kazakhstan)	Contract termination	Summer	Free	
8	MF	(Spain)	Javi Hervás	36	EU	CD Mirandés (Spain)	Contract termination	Summer	€30,000	fkzeljeznicar.ba
4	MF	(Bosnia and Herzegovina)	Dino Hasanović	29	Non-EU	Čelik	Loan	Summer	N/A	
40	GK	(Bosnia and Herzegovina)	Emir Ćutahija	28	Non-EU	Velež	Loan	Summer	N/A	
20	MF	(Bosnia and Herzegovina)	Damir Sadiković	30	Non-EU	Krško (Slovenia)	Loan	Summer	N/A	
31	FW	(Bosnia and Herzegovina)	Denis Pozder	36	EU	KFC Uerdingen (Germany)	Contract termination	Summer	Free	
33	DF	(Greece)	Dimitris Toskas	34	EU	Doxa Drama (Greece)	Contract termination	Summer	Free	
14	DF	(Bosnia and Herzegovina)	Dino Bevab	32	Non-EU	Olimpic	Contract termination	Summer	Free	fkzeljeznicar.ba
70	DF	(Bosnia and Herzegovina)	Senad Husić	35	Non-EU	Čelik	Contract termination	Summer	Free	fkzeljeznicar.ba
17	MF	(Sweden)	Mirza Halvadžić	29	EU	Mjällby AIF (Sweden)	Contract termination	Summer	Free	fkzeljeznicar.ba
32	DF	(Bosnia and Herzegovina)	Ismail Duraković	28	Non-EU	Free agent	Contract termination	Winter	Free	
5	DF	(Bosnia and Herzegovina)	Aleksandar Kosorić	38	Non-EU	Radnik	Contract termination	Winter	Free	fkzeljeznicar.ba
22	MF	(Bosnia and Herzegovina)	Adnan Šećerović	34	Non-EU	Mladost Doboj Kakanj	Contract termination	Winter	Free	fkzeljeznicar.ba
92	MF	(Bosnia and Herzegovina)	Milivoje Lazić	33	Non-EU	Mladost Doboj Kakanj	Contract termination	Winter	Free	fkzeljeznicar.ba
40	GK	(Bosnia and Herzegovina)	Emir Ćutahija	28	Non-EU	Olimpic	Contract termination	Winter	Free	
21	FW	(Bosnia and Herzegovina)	Dženis Beganović	29	Non-EU	Metalleghe-BSI	Loan	Winter	N/A	fkzeljeznicar.ba
80	MF	(Croatia)	Sandi Križman	36	EU	Koper (Slovenia)	Contract termination	Winter	Free	fkzeljeznicar.ba
6	DF	(Bosnia and Herzegovina)	Kerim Memija	29	EU	Vejle BK (Denmark)	Transfer	Winter	€150,000	fkzeljeznicar.ba
30	FW	(Bosnia and Herzegovina)	Aldin Ćeman	30	Non-EU	Goražde	Loan	Winter	N/A	fkzeljeznicar.ba

Total income: ▲€180,000

== Club ==
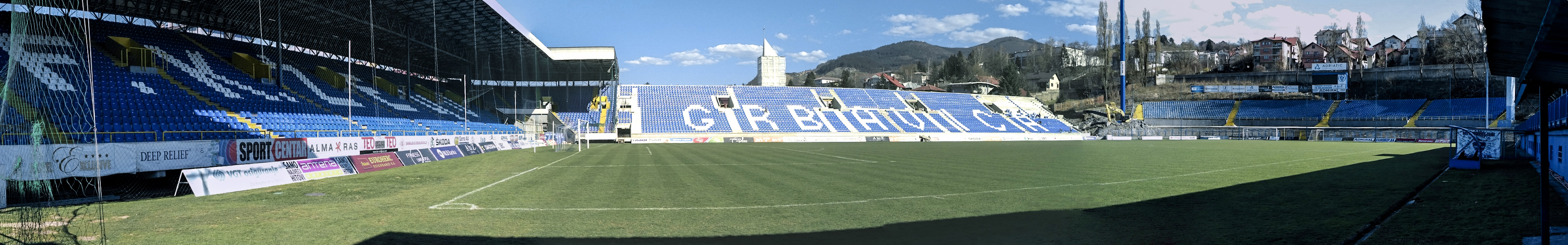
A panoramic view of Grbavica Stadium, spring 2017

=== Coaching staff ===
Name	Role
(Serbia) Slavko Petrović	Head coach
(Bosnia and Herzegovina) Adin Mulaosmanović	Assistant coach
(Bosnia and Herzegovina) Aldin Čenan	Director of sports
(Bosnia and Herzegovina) Haris Alihodžić	Team manager
Vacant	Fitness coach
(Bosnia and Herzegovina) Elvis Karić	Goalkeeping coach
(Bosnia and Herzegovina) Erdijan Pekić	Commissioner for security
(Bosnia and Herzegovina) Zlatko Dervišević	Doctor
(Bosnia and Herzegovina) Edin Kulenović	Doctor
(Bosnia and Herzegovina) Raif Zeba	Physiotherapist
(Bosnia and Herzegovina) Mirza Halvadžija	Physiotherapist

=== Other information ===
Honorary Chairman of the Club	(Bosnia and Herzegovina) Ivica Osim
Chairman of the Assembly	(Bosnia and Herzegovina) Adis Hadžić
Chairman of the Supervisory Board	(Bosnia and Herzegovina) Senad Misimović
Chairman of the Board	(Bosnia and Herzegovina) Vedran Vukotić
Director	(Bosnia and Herzegovina) Mirsad Šiljak
Team manager	(Bosnia and Herzegovina) Haris Alihodžić
Head coach	(Serbia) Slavko Petrović
Ground (capacity and dimensions)	Grbavica Stadium (12,000 / 105x66 m)

Source: Željezničar and Grbavica Stadium

== Competitions ==
=== Pre-season ===
18 June 2016	Željezničar (Bosnia and Herzegovina)	0–1	(Bosnia and Herzegovina) Olimpic	Sarajevo, Bosnia and Herzegovina
17:30		Report	Hadžić 6' (pen.)	Stadium: Grbavica Stadium

27 June 2016	Željezničar (Bosnia and Herzegovina)	0–1	(Bosnia and Herzegovina) Mladost Doboj Kakanj	Kupres, Bosnia and Herzegovina
17:00		report	Alexandre Balotelli 105'

5 July 2016	Železničar Maribor (Slovenia)	1–8	(Bosnia and Herzegovina) Željezničar	Maribor, Slovenia
18:00	Arzenšek 86'	report	Boccaccini 13'; M. Stevanović 15'; Mujagić 40', 51'; Pozder 46', 58'; Žerić 88'; Memija 90'	Stadium: Tabor Sports Park

6 July 2016	Rudar Velenje (Slovenia)	0–1	(Bosnia and Herzegovina) Željezničar	Velenje, Slovenia
18:00		report	Blagojević 86'	Stadium: Ob Jezeru City Stadium

10 July 2016	Željezničar (Bosnia and Herzegovina)	0–0	(Russia) Arsenal Tula	Zreče, Slovenia
18:00				Stadium: TBD

16 July 2016	Željezničar (Bosnia and Herzegovina)	1–1	(Bosnia and Herzegovina) Metalleghe-BSI	Sarajevo, Bosnia and Herzegovina
18:00	Lendrić 84'	Report	Smajić 42'	Stadium: Grbavica Stadium

=== Mid-season ===
27 July 2016	Koraj (Bosnia and Herzegovina)	0–9	(Bosnia and Herzegovina) Željezničar	Koraj, Bosnia and Herzegovina
17:00		Report	Žerić; B. Šehić; Šubo; Mujagić; Lazić; A. Šehić; Bijedić; Jusufi	Stadium: SRC Luke

3 September 2016	Željezničar (Bosnia and Herzegovina)	1–1	(Bosnia and Herzegovina) Vitez	Kupres, Bosnia and Herzegovina
17:00	Lendrić	Report	Dedić	Referee: Unknown

8 October 2016	Željezničar (Bosnia and Herzegovina)	0–3	(Croatia) Split	Međugorje, Bosnia and Herzegovina
16:00				Stadium: Sport Centar Circle International

12 November 2016	Željezničar (Bosnia and Herzegovina)	0–1	(Croatia) Split	Međugorje, Bosnia and Herzegovina
13:00				Stadium: Sport Centar Circle International

30 November 2016	Željezničar (Bosnia and Herzegovina)	3–0	(Bosnia and Herzegovina) Novi Grad Sarajevo	Sarajevo, Bosnia and Herzegovina
	Beganović 24'; Mujagić 30'; Radinović 73'			Stadium: Extra Ground Grbavica Stadium

28 January 2017	Željezničar (Bosnia and Herzegovina)	2–0	(Bosnia and Herzegovina) Čapljina	Međugorje, Bosnia and Herzegovina
14:30	Lendrić 35', 52'	Report		Stadium: Sport Centar Circle International

2 February 2017	Željezničar (Bosnia and Herzegovina)	0–0	(Russia) Krylia Sovetov	Antalya, Turkey
15:00 CET		Report		Stadium: Sueno Hotels Golf Belek

6 February 2017	Željezničar (Bosnia and Herzegovina)	0–0	(Russia) Amkar Perm	Antalya, Turkey
15:00 CET		Report		Stadium: Bellis Sports Center

11 February 2017	Željezničar (Bosnia and Herzegovina)	1–1	(Kazakhstan) Astana	Antalya, Turkey
14:00 CET	Boccaccini 30'	Report	Murtazayev 48'	Stadium: Mardan Sports Complex

18 February 2017	Velež (Bosnia and Herzegovina)	0–2	(Bosnia and Herzegovina) Željezničar	Mostar, Bosnia and Herzegovina
14:30		Report	Lendrić 57'; Zakarić 71'	Stadium: Extra Ground Vrapčići Stadium

=== Overall ===
Competition	Started round	Final result	First match	Last Match
2016–17 Premier League of Bosnia and Herzegovina	—N/a	2nd	23 July 2016	28 May 2017
2016–17 Bosnia and Herzegovina Football Cup	Round of 32	Semi final	21 September 2016	19 April 2017

=== Regular season table ===
Pos	Team	Pld	W	D	L	GF	GA	GD	Pts	Qualification
1	Zrinjski Mostar	22	13	6	3	38	19	+19	45	Qualification for the Championship round
2	Željezničar Sarajevo	22	13	5	4	28	14	+14	44	Qualification for the Championship round
3	Sarajevo	22	12	7	3	30	16	+14	43	Qualification for the Championship round
4	Radnik Bijeljina	22	10	7	5	31	22	+9	37	Qualification for the Championship round
5	Sloboda Tuzla	22	9	8	5	31	24	+7	35	Qualification for the Championship round

Source: Football Association of Bosnia and Herzegovina, UEFA, Soccerway
Rules for classification: 1) Points; 2) Goal difference; 3) Goals scored; 4) Head-to-head points; 5) Head-to-head goal difference; 6) Head-to-head away goals (only if two teams); 7) Head-to-head goals scored; 8) Goal difference; 9) Play-off. (Criteria 2 and 3 are not used to decide champion, UEFA competition qualification, or relegation)

==== Results summary ====
Overall								Home						Away					
Pld	W	D	L	GF	GA	GD	Pts	W	D	L	GF	GA	GD	W	D	L	GF	GA	GD
22	13	5	4	28	14	+14	44	7	2	2	15	9	+6	6	3	2	13	5	+8

Last updated: 18 March 2017.
Source: Sportsport.ba

==== Results by round ====
Round	1	2	3	4	5	6	7	8	9	10	11	12	13	14	15	16	17	18	19	20	21	22
Ground	H	A	H	A	H	H	A	H	A	H	A	A	H	A	H	A	A	H	A	H	A	H
Result	D	W	W	L	L	L	D	W	D	W	W	D	W	L	D	W	W	W	W	W	W	W
Position	9	4	2	4	7	9	8	8	8	7	6	5	4	5	5	5	5	3	3	3	3	2

Updated to match(es) played on 18 March 2017. Source: Competitions
A = Away; H = Home; W = Win; D = Draw; L = Loss

==== Matches ====
23 July 2016 1	Željezničar	1–1	Sarajevo	Sarajevo
20:30	Husić (yellow card) 27' (yellow-red card) 31'; Kosorić (yellow card) 32'; Lendrić 53', (yellow card) 54'; Pozder (yellow card) 71'	Report	Kadušić (yellow card) 32'; Ahmetović 59', (yellow card) 73'; Duljević (yellow card) 87'	Stadium: Grbavica Stadium; Attendance: 12,000; Referee: Ognjen Valjić (Banja Luka)

30 July 2016 2	Olimpic	0–2	Željezničar	Sarajevo
17:30	Kobiljar (yellow card) 42'; Karić (yellow card) 45'; Regoje (yellow card) 57'; Turković (yellow card) 72'	Report	Lendrić 43'; Šećerović (yellow card) 45'; Boccaccini 62'	Stadium: Otoka Stadium; Attendance: 2,000; Referee: Antoni Bandić (Grude)

6 August 2016 3	Željezničar	2–0	Široki Brijeg	Sarajevo
20:00	Lendrić 37'; Nikolić (yellow card) 47', (goal) 68'; Šećerović (yellow card) 77'	Report	Krstanović (yellow card) 20'; Ivanković (yellow card) 35'; Pandža (yellow card) 71'; Wagner (yellow card) 85'	Stadium: Grbavica Stadium; Attendance: 5,500; Referee: Ognjen Valjić (Banja Luka)

10 August 2016 4	Sloboda Tuzla	2–0	Željezničar	Tuzla
17:30	Đidić (yellow card) 23'; Ordagić (yellow card) 41'; Karić (yellow card) 44'; Veselinović (yellow card) 52', (goal) 54'; Stjepanović 57'	Report	Boccaccini (yellow card) 42'; Blagojević (yellow card) 58'; Halvadžić (yellow card) 70'; S. Stevanović (yellow card) 78'	Stadium: Tušanj City Stadium; Attendance: 4,000; Referee: Vladimir Bjelica (East Sarajevo)

14 August 2016 5	Željezničar	0–2	Vitez	Sarajevo
20:00	Husić (yellow card) 42'; Kosorić (yellow card) 70'; Blagojević (red card) 85'; Beganović (yellow card) 90'	Report	Tirić (yellow card) 65'; Đerić (yellow card) 67'; Kapetan 76'; Kokot 80'; Dedić (yellow card) 85'	Stadium: Grbavica Stadium; Attendance: 4,500; Referee: Antoni Bandić (Grude)

20 August 2016 6	Željezničar	0–1	Zrinjski	Sarajevo
21:00	Bekrić (yellow card) 45'; Kosorić (yellow card) 59'; Šećerović (yellow card) 88' (yellow-red card) 90'; Beganović (yellow card) 90'	Report	Tomić (yellow card) 20'; Bilbija 55'; Barić (yellow card) 85'	Stadium: Grbavica Stadium; Attendance: 4,000; Referee: Elvis Mujić (Banovići)

27 August 2016 7	Čelik	1–1	Željezničar	Zenica
19:30	Šivšić (yellow card) 32'; Pezer (yellow card) 55'; Popović 86' (pen.), (yellow card) 87'	Report	Beganović (yellow card) 17'; Radinović (yellow card) 49'; Bekrić 81'; Husić (yellow card) 85'; Boccaccini (yellow card) 86'; Toskas (yellow card) 90'	Stadium: Bilino Polje Stadium; Attendance: 2,500; Referee: Dragan Skakić (Gradiška)

10 September 2016 8	Željezničar	2–1	Krupa	Sarajevo
19:30	Križman 7'; Kosorić (yellow card) 26'; Stanić (yellow card) 75'; Marković 83'	Report	Jašarević (yellow card) 17' (yellow-red card) 90'; Perić (yellow card) 24'; Milutinović 27' (pen.); Dijaković (yellow card) 39'; Redžić (yellow card) 58'; Čomor (yellow card) 70'	Stadium: Grbavica Stadium; Attendance: 4,000; Referee: Goran Paradžik (Ljubuški)

17 September 2016 9	Mladost Doboj Kakanj	0–0	Željezničar	Doboj
15:30	Brkić (yellow card) 79'; Isaković (yellow card) 90+3'	Report	Stanić (yellow card) 50'	Stadium: Gradski stadion Attendance: 1,500; Referee: Vladimir Bjelica (East Sarajevo)

25 September 2016 10	Željezničar	2–1	Metalleghe-BSI	Sarajevo
19:00	Lendrić 10'; Križman 41'; Marković (yellow card) 59'; Radinović (yellow card) 86'	Report	Smiljanić 75'; Smajić (yellow card) 85'	Stadium: Grbavica Stadium; Attendance: 5,000; Referee: Dragan Skakić (Gradiška)

1 October 2016 11	Radnik	1–2	Željezničar	Bijeljina
15:30	Zeljković (yellow card) 45+1'; Obradović 58' (pen.); Beširević (yellow card) 84'	Report	Križman 47'; S. Stevanović (yellow card) 80'; Nikolić 90'	Stadium: Gradski stadion Attendance: 1,200; Referee: Darko Obradović (Stolac)

16 October 2016 12	Sarajevo	0–0	Željezničar	Sarajevo
15:00	Ćetković (yellow card) 21'; Rustemović (yellow card) 85'	Report	Kosorić (yellow card) 36'; Marković (yellow card) 55'; S. Stevanović (yellow card) 82'; Boccaccini (yellow card) 90'	Stadium: Asim Ferhatović Hase Stadium; Attendance: 12,500; Referee: Irfan Peljto (Sarajevo)

22 October 2016 13	Željezničar	3–2	Olimpic	Sarajevo
19:00	Lendrić 11', 81'; Memija (yellow card) 12'; M. Stevanović 11'; Blagojević (yellow card) 56'	Report	Zulčić (yellow card) 49' (yellow-red card) 82'; Lelić 69'; Plakalo 90'	Stadium: Grbavica Stadium; Attendance: 4,000; Referee: Elvis Mujić (Banovići)

30 October 2016 14	Široki Brijeg	1–0	Željezničar	Široki Brijeg
16:30	Baraban (yellow card) 16' (yellow-red card) 84'; Wagner 38'; Kožul (yellow card) 40'; Barišić (yellow card) 90'	Report	Marković (yellow card) 14'; S. Stevanović (yellow card) 77'	Stadium: Pecara Stadium; Attendance: 3,000; Referee: Zoran Grbić (Prijedor)

5 November 2016 15	Željezničar	1–1	Sloboda Tuzla	Sarajevo
16:00	S. Stevanović (yellow card) 30'; Memija (yellow card) 47'; Lendrić 62'; Nikolić (yellow card) 77'	Report	Efendić (yellow card) 80'; Krpić 85'	Stadium: Grbavica Stadium; Attendance: 4,500; Referee: Ognjen Valjić (Banja Luka)

19 November 2016 16	Vitez	0–2	Željezničar	Vitez
13:00	Hodžurda (yellow card) 11'; Mamić (yellow card) 52'	Report	Lendrić 27', 70'; S. Stevanović (yellow card) 42'; Kosorić (yellow card) 59'	Stadium: Gradski stadion Attendance: 900; Referee: Elvis Mujić (Banovići)

26 November 2016 17	Zrinjski	0–4	Željezničar	Mostar
14:00	Čolić (yellow card) 39'; Stojkić (yellow card) 52'; Jakovljević (red card) 54'; Mešanović (yellow card) 55'; Filipović (yellow card) 76'	Report	Križman (yellow card) 39', (goal) 55' (pen.); Lendrić 45+2'; Bekrić 47'; M. Stevanović 79'	Stadium: Bijeli Brijeg Stadium; Attendance: 2,500; Referee: Zoran Grbić (Prijedor)

3 December 2016 18	Željezničar	1–0	Čelik	Sarajevo
13:00	Marković (yellow card) 34', (goal) 82'; Križman (yellow card) 90'	Report	Pezer (yellow card) 26' (yellow-red card) 32'; Marković (yellow card) 84'; Adilović (yellow card) 90'	Stadium: Grbavica Stadium; Attendance: 5,500; Referee: Darko Obradović (Stolac)

26 February 2017 19	Krupa	0–1	Željezničar	Krupa na Vrbasu
14:30	Dujaković (yellow card) 60'; Milanović (yellow card) 83'; Aleksić (yellow card) 88'	Report	Lendrić 65'	Stadium: Gradski stadion Attendance: 1,600; Referee: Elvis Mujić (Banovići)

4 March 2017 20	Željezničar	1–0	Mladost Doboj Kakanj	Sarajevo
15:00	Lendrić 20'; Marković (yellow card) 36'	Report	Maksimović (yellow card) 55'; Rizvanović (yellow card) 79'	Stadium: Grbavica Stadium; Attendance: 8,500; Referee: Ilija Živković (Orašje)

11 March 2017 21	Metalleghe-BSI	0–1	Željezničar	Banja Luka
15:00	Jovanović (yellow card) 46'; Deak (yellow card) 69'; Smajić (yellow card) 73'; Durak (yellow card) 90'	Report	Blagojević (yellow card) 46'; Zeba 89'	Stadium: Banja Luka City Stadium; Attendance: 350; Referee: Zoran Grbić (Prijedor)

18 March 2017 22	Željezničar	2–0	Radnik	Sarajevo
15:00	Zakarić 42', (yellow card) 74'; S. Stevanović (yellow card) 90+2'; Lendrić 90+4'	Report	Peco (yellow card) 71'	Stadium: Grbavica Stadium; Referee: Goran Paradžik (Ljubuški)

=== Championship round table ===
Pos	Team	Pld	W	D	L	GF	GA	GD	Pts	Qualification
1	Zrinjski Mostar (C)	32	18	10	4	54	25	+29	64	Qualification for the Champions League second qualifying round
2	Željezničar Sarajevo	32	18	9	5	41	22	+19	63	Qualification for the Europa League first qualifying round
3	Sarajevo	32	16	11	5	41	22	+19	59	Qualification for the Europa League first qualifying round
4	Krupa	32	12	10	10	40	34	+6	46	
5	Sloboda Tuzla	32	11	10	11	39	42	−3	43	
6	Radnik Bijeljina	32	10	10	12	37	39	−2	40	

Source: Football Association of Bosnia and Herzegovina, UEFA, Soccerway
Rules for classification: 1) Points; 2) Goal difference; 3) Goals scored; 4) Head-to-head points; 5) Head-to-head goal difference; 6) Head-to-head away goals (only if two teams); 7) Head-to-head goals scored; 8) Goal difference; 9) Play-off. (Criteria 2 and 3 are not used to decide champion, UEFA competition qualification, or relegation)
(C) Champions

==== Results summary ====
Overall								Home						Away					
Pld	W	D	L	GF	GA	GD	Pts	W	D	L	GF	GA	GD	W	D	L	GF	GA	GD
32	18	9	5	41	22	+19	63	11	3	2	24	13	+11	7	6	3	17	9	+8

Last updated: 28 May 2017.
Source: Sportsport.ba

==== Results by round ====
Round	1	2	3	4	5	6	7	8	9	10
Ground	H	A	H	H	A	A	H	A	A	H
Result	W	D	W	D	W	D	W	D	L	W
Position	2	2	1	2	1	1	1	1	2	2

Updated to match(es) played on 28 May 2017. Source: Competitions
A = Away; H = Home; W = Win; D = Draw; L = Loss

==== Matches ====
1 April 2017 1	Željezničar	4–2	Sloboda Tuzla	Sarajevo
19:00	Lendrić 45', 57', 65'; Bogičević (yellow card) 63'; Radinović (yellow card) 88'; Stanić 90+1'	Report	Stjepanović (yellow card) 14'; Ordagić (yellow card) 54'; Zec 61'; Kalezić (yellow card) 71'; Subić 74', (yellow card) 90+'; Škahić (yellow card) 89'; Lazevski (yellow card) 90+1'; Tandir (yellow card) 90+1'	Stadium: Grbavica Stadium; Attendance: 13,500; Referee: Dragan Petrović (Banja Luka)

5 April 2017 2	Zrinjski	0–0	Željezničar	Mostar
18:30	Todorović (yellow card) 49'; Stojkić (yellow card) 60'	Report	S. Stevanović (yellow card) 37'; Stanić (yellow card) 66'; Kerla (yellow card) 71'; Musa (yellow card) 90+5'	Stadium: Bijeli Brijeg Stadium; Attendance: 4,500; Referee: Ognjen Valjić (Banja Luka)

8 April 2017 3	Željezničar	1–0	Krupa	Sarajevo
20:00	Lendrić 13'; Hasanović (yellow card) 90'	Report	Ljubenović (yellow card) 50'; Redžić (yellow card) 86'; Vukotić (yellow card) 88'	Stadium: Grbavica Stadium; Attendance: 6,000; Referee: Edin Jakupović (Bihać)

15 April 2017 4	Željezničar	0–0	Sarajevo	Sarajevo
19:30	Radinović (yellow card) 23'; Kerla (yellow card) 76' (yellow-red card) 77'; Stanić (yellow card) 86'	Report	Sarić (yellow card) 64'; Novaković (yellow card) 76'; Ivetić (yellow card) 86'	Stadium: Grbavica Stadium; Attendance: 13,500; Referee: Admir Šehović (Sarajevo)

23 April 2017 5	Radnik	0–1	Željezničar	Bijeljina
17:00	Beširević (yellow card) 86'; Ostojić (yellow card) 90+2'	Report	Zeba 65'; Stanić (red card) 68'; Marković (yellow card) 79'; Kjosevski (yellow card) 90'; S. Stevanović (yellow card) 90+2'; Crnov (yellow card) 90+4'	Stadium: Gradski stadion Attendance: 1,500; Referee: Goran Paradžik (Ljubuški)

30 April 2017 6	Sloboda Tuzla	2–2	Željezničar	Tuzla
17:00	Zec 13', 45+1'; Ordagić (yellow card) 73'	Report	Crnov 37'; Musa (yellow card) 71'; Nikolić 84'	Stadium: Tušanj City Stadium; Attendance: 4,000; Referee: Vladimir Bjelica (East Sarajevo)

6 May 2017 7	Željezničar	2–1	Zrinjski	Sarajevo
20:00	Zeba (yellow card) 14'; Lendrić 21'; S. Stevanović (yellow card) 73'; Marković 77'; Bekrić (yellow card) 84'	Report	Stojkić (yellow card) 45+2'; Filipović 80'	Stadium: Grbavica Stadium; Attendance: 9,000; Referee: Edin Jakupović (Bihać)

14 May 2017 8	Krupa	1–1	Željezničar	Krupa na Vrbasu
17:00	Koljić (yellow card) 39'; Barić 61'	Report	Zakarić (yellow card) 21'; Bekrić 29'; Stojanović (yellow card) 60'; Bogičević (yellow card) 64'; Boccaccini (yellow card) 79'	Stadium: Gradski stadion Referee: Edin Jakupović (Bihać)

20 May 2017 9	Sarajevo	1–0	Željezničar	Sarajevo
17:00	Am. Bekić 21' (pen.); Al. Bekić (yellow card) 64'	Report	Kerla (yellow card) 85'; S. Stevanović (yellow card) 88'	Stadium: Asim Ferhatović Hase Stadium; Attendance: 8,000; Referee: Irfan Peljto (Sarajevo)

28 May 2017 10	Željezničar	2–1	Radnik	Sarajevo
17:00	Marković (yellow card) 33'; Bogičević (yellow card) 45'; Osmanković (yellow card) 50'; Lendrić 56'; Zakarić 90+2'	Report	Peco 15'; Ostojić (yellow card) 61'	Stadium: Grbavica Stadium; Attendance: 4,000; Referee: Elvis Mujić (Banovići)

=== Kup Bosne i Hercegovine ===
==== Round of 32 ====
21 September 2016	Brotnjo	0–7	Željezničar	Čitluk
16:00	Mustapić (yellow card) 32'; Miličević (yellow card) 45'; Sulić (yellow card) 57'; Soldo (yellow card) 85'	Report	Lazić 6', 89'; Nikolić 15'; Bekrić 38'; Beganović 47', 81', (yellow card) 54'; Kosorić 53'; Blagojević (yellow card) 59'	Stadium: Gradski stadion Bare; Attendance: 500; Referee: Antoni Bandić (Grude)

==== Round of 16 ====
19 October 2016 First leg	Željezničar	5–1	Goražde	Sarajevo
19:00	Nikolić 14', (yellow card) 18'; Boccaccini (yellow card) 21'; Blagojević 41'; Lazić 43'; Bekrić 47'; Žerić 75'	Report	Šuntić 19' (pen.); Čurić (yellow card) 36'; Adžem (yellow card) 63'; Rovčanin (yellow card) 71'	Stadium: Grbavica Stadium; Attendance: 1,700; Referee: Ermin Sivac (Zenica)

26 October 2016 Second leg	Goražde	0–3 (1–8 agg.)	Željezničar	Goražde
15:00	Adžem (yellow card) 30'; Šuntić (yellow card) 55'	Report	Stanić (yellow card) 29'; Bogičević 67'; Šabanadžović 81'; Mujagić 88'	Stadium: Stadion Midhat Drljević; Attendance: 700; Referee: Zoran Soknić (Istočno Sarajevo)

==== Quarter-finals ====
8 March 2017 First leg	Radnik	2–2	Željezničar	Bijeljina
15:00	Franić 37'; Arnautović (yellow card) 42'; Obradović 59'; Beširević (yellow card) 68'	Report	Lendrić (yellow card) 27', (goal) 48'; Stanić (yellow card) 35'; Bogičević (yellow card) 59'; Zeba (yellow card) 66'; Marković 68'	Stadium: Gradski stadion Attendance: 500; Referee: Dragan Petrović (Banja Luka)

15 March 2017 Second leg	Željezničar	2–0 (4–2 agg.)	Radnik	Sarajevo
15:00	S. Stevanović (yellow card) 45+1'; Radinović (yellow card) 52'; Nikolić 71'; Bekrić 82'; Stanić (yellow card) 86'	Report	Arnautović (yellow card) 67'	Stadium: Grbavica Stadium; Attendance: 3,500; Referee: Edin Jakupović (Bihać)

==== Semi-finals ====
12 April 2017 First leg	Široki Brijeg	1–0	Željezničar	Široki Brijeg
18:00	Krstanović 55'	Report	Bogičević (yellow card) 8'; Musa (yellow card) 53'; S. Stevanović (yellow card) 58'; Nikolić (yellow card) 90'	Stadium: Stadion Pecara; Attendance: 4,000; Referee: Edin Jakupović (Bihać)

19 April 2017 Second leg	Željezničar	0–3	Široki Brijeg	Sarajevo
18:00	Bogičević (yellow card) 37'; Marković (yellow card) 44'; Musa (yellow card) 58'	Report	Krstanović 5'; Pandža 11', (yellow card) 37'; Zlomislić (yellow card) 45'; Čabraja 56'	Stadium: Stadion Grbavica; Attendance: 6,000; Referee: Zoran Grbić (Prijedor)
