= 2015–16 FK Željezničar season =

Željezničar
2015–16 season
- President: Almir Gredić (until 27 September); Vedran Vukotić (from 30 January)
- Manager: Milomir Odović (until 10 September); Vlado Čapljić (from 11 September — until 28 September); Edis Mulalić (from 28 September — until 7 May 2016)
- Stadium: Grbavica Stadium
- Premijer Liga BiH: 5th
- Kup BiH: Semi-finals
- UEFA Europa League: Third qualifying round
- Top goalscorer: League: Ivan Lendrić (7); All: Ognjen Đelmić (9)
- Highest home attendance: 25,000 vs Standard Liège
- Lowest home attendance: 700 vs GOŠK Gabela

FK Željezničar is a football club in Bosnia and Herzegovina. This article summarizes statistics from the 2015–16 football season.

== Squad statistics ==
=== Players ===
N	Pos.	Nat.	Name	Age	EU	Since	App	Goals	Ends	Transfer fee	Notes
1	GK	(Bosnia and Herzegovina)	Irfan Fejzić	38	Non-EU	2016 (Winter)	3	0	2018	Free	
2	DF	(Serbia)	Siniša Stevanović	36	Non-EU	2016 (Winter)	14	0	2018	Free	
4	MF	(Bosnia and Herzegovina)	Dino Hasanović	29	Non-EU	2015	10	0	2018	Youth system	
5	DF	(Bosnia and Herzegovina)	Aleksandar Kosorić	38	Non-EU	2014	69	2	2018	Free	Second nationality: Serbia
6	DF	(Bosnia and Herzegovina)	Kerim Memija	29	Non-EU	2014 (Winter)	62	4	2019	Youth system	
7	DF	(Croatia)	Mirko Kramarić	36	EU	2016 (Winter)	11	0	2018	Free	Second nationality: Sweden
8	MF	(Bosnia and Herzegovina)	Nermin Zolotić	31	Non-EU	2016 (Winter)	72	1	2016	Free	On loan from Gent & Originally from youth system
9	FW	(Bosnia and Herzegovina)	Nedo Turković	35	Non-EU	2014	23	2	2016	Free	
10	MF	(Bosnia and Herzegovina)	Samir Bekrić	40	Non-EU	2016 (Winter)	167	38	2019	Free	
11	MF	(Serbia)	Jovan Blagojević	37	Non-EU	2015	39	1	2018	Free	
12	GK	(Bosnia and Herzegovina)	Emir Ćutahija	27	Non-EU	2014 (Winter)	0	0	2017	Youth system	
13	GK	(Bosnia and Herzegovina)	Vedran Kjosevski	29	Non-EU	2013	23	0	2018	Youth system	Second nationality: Macedonia
14	FW	(Slovenia)	Dejan Djermanović	36	EU	2016 (Winter)	12	2	2018	Free	
15	DF	(Bosnia and Herzegovina)	Jadranko Bogičević	42	Non-EU	2016 (Winter)	115	10	2018	Free	
16	MF	(Bosnia and Herzegovina)	Srđan Stanić	35	EU	2016 (Winter)	209	10	2018	Free	Originally from youth system
17	MF	(Sweden)	Mirza Halvadžić	29	EU	2016 (Winter)	3	0	2018	Free	Second nationality: Bosnia and Herzegovina
19	MF	(Bosnia and Herzegovina)	Enis Sadiković	35	Non-EU	2013	50	1	2017	Free	
20	MF	(Bosnia and Herzegovina)	Damir Sadiković	30	Non-EU	2013 (Winter)	84	8	2018	Youth system	
21	FW	(Bosnia and Herzegovina)	Dženis Beganović	29	Non-EU	2014	36	7	2019	Youth system	
23	MF	(Bosnia and Herzegovina)	Amer Hiroš	28	Non-EU	2014	7	0	2016	Youth system	On loan to Goražde
24	FW	(Croatia)	Ivan Lendrić	33	EU	2016 (Winter)	15	9	2017	Free	
25	FW	(Brazil)	Tiago Farias	35	Non-EU	2015	27	5	2017	Free	
27	DF	(Bosnia and Herzegovina)	Kemal Osmanković	28	Non-EU	2014 (Winter)	1	0	2017	Youth system	
29	FW	(Bosnia and Herzegovina)	Ajdin Mujagić	27	Non-EU	2014	9	2	2017	Youth system	
30	GK	(Bosnia and Herzegovina)	Aldin Ćeman	30	Non-EU	2014	1	0	2016	Youth system	
32	MF	(Bosnia and Herzegovina)	Muris Midžić	28	Non-EU	2015	0	0	2018	Youth system	On loan to Goražde
33	DF	(Bosnia and Herzegovina)	Edin Hadžović	30	Non-EU	2014	0	0	2018	Youth system	On loan to Goražde
35	DF	(Bosnia and Herzegovina)	Adnan Alihodžić	29	Non-EU	2015	0	0	2018	Youth system	On loan to Bratstvo Gračanica
36	MF	(Bosnia and Herzegovina)	Benjamin Šehić	28	Non-EU	2015	1	0	2018	Youth system	On loan to Bratstvo Gračanica
37	DF	(Bosnia and Herzegovina)	Emir Hodžurda	34	Non-EU	2015	13	0	2017	Free	Originally from youth system
39	MF	(Bosnia and Herzegovina)	Denis Žerić	27	Non-EU	2015	1	0	2018	Youth system	
40	DF	(Bosnia and Herzegovina)	Ismail Duraković	28	Non-EU	2014 (Winter)	0	0	2017	Youth system	
44	MF	(Bosnia and Herzegovina)	Adnan Zahirović	35	Non-EU	2016 (Winter)	15	0	2018	Free	
88	MF	(Bosnia and Herzegovina)	Miroslav Stevanović	34	Non-EU	2016 (Winter)	16	4	2017	Free	Second nationality: Serbia
90	MF	(Brazil)	Mailson	35	Non-EU	2016 (Winter)	1	0	2018	Free	

- Last updated: 15 May 2016
- Source: fkzeljeznicar.ba

Total squad cost: €8.33M

=== From the youth system ===
Note: Flags indicate national team as defined under FIFA eligibility rules; some limited exceptions apply. Players may hold more than one non-FIFA nationality.

No. / Pos. / Nation / Player	No. / Pos. / Nation / Player

=== Disciplinary record ===
Includes all competitive matches. The list is sorted by position, and then shirt number.

N	P	Nat.	Name	League			Cup			Europe			Others			Total			Notes
N	P	Nat.	Name	Yellow card	Second yellow card	Red card	Yellow card	Second yellow card	Red card	Yellow card	Second yellow card	Red card	Yellow card	Second yellow card	Red card	Yellow card	Second yellow card	Red card	Notes
1	GK	(Bosnia and Herzegovina)	Irfan Fejzić																
12	GK	(Bosnia and Herzegovina)	Emir Ćutahija																
13	GK	(Bosnia and Herzegovina)	Vedran Kjosevski	4												4			
30	GK	(Bosnia and Herzegovina)	Aldin Ćeman																
2	DF	(Serbia)	Siniša Stevanović	5			1									6			
5	DF	(Bosnia and Herzegovina)	Aleksandar Kosorić	4		1										4		1	
6	DF	(Bosnia and Herzegovina)	Kerim Memija	6			1			1						8			
7	DF	(Croatia)	Mirko Kramarić	1												1			
15	DF	(Bosnia and Herzegovina)	Jadranko Bogičević	2												2			
27	DF	(Bosnia and Herzegovina)	Kemal Osmanković																
33	DF	(Bosnia and Herzegovina)	Edin Hadžović	1												1			
35	DF	(Bosnia and Herzegovina)	Adnan Alihodžić																
37	DF	(Bosnia and Herzegovina)	Emir Hodžurda	3												3			
40	DF	(Bosnia and Herzegovina)	Ismail Duraković																
4	MF	(Bosnia and Herzegovina)	Dino Hasanović	2												2			
8	MF	(Bosnia and Herzegovina)	Nermin Zolotić																
10	MF	(Bosnia and Herzegovina)	Samir Bekrić	2												2			
11	MF	(Serbia)	Jovan Blagojević	5			2	1								7	1		
16	MF	(Bosnia and Herzegovina)	Srđan Stanić	3												3			
17	MF	(Sweden)	Mirza Halvadžić																
19	MF	(Bosnia and Herzegovina)	Enis Sadiković	1		1	1			1						3		1	
20	MF	(Bosnia and Herzegovina)	Damir Sadiković	1						1						2			
23	MF	(Bosnia and Herzegovina)	Amer Hiroš																
32	MF	(Bosnia and Herzegovina)	Muris Midžić																
36	MF	(Bosnia and Herzegovina)	Benjamin Šehić				1									1			
39	MF	(Bosnia and Herzegovina)	Denis Žerić																
44	MF	(Bosnia and Herzegovina)	Adnan Zahirović	1												1			
88	MF	(Bosnia and Herzegovina)	Miroslav Stevanović	3												3			
90	MF	(Brazil)	Mailson																
9	FW	(Bosnia and Herzegovina)	Nedo Turković																
14	FW	(Slovenia)	Dejan Djermanović																
21	FW	(Bosnia and Herzegovina)	Dženis Beganović	6												6			
24	FW	(Croatia)	Ivan Lendrić	1												1			
25	FW	(Brazil)	Tiago Farias	1												1			
29	FW	(Bosnia and Herzegovina)	Ajdin Mujagić				1									1			

Last updated: 15 May 2016
Source: Competitive matches and fkzeljeznicar.ba
Ordered by (red card) , (second yellow card) and (yellow card)
(yellow card) = Number of bookings; (second yellow card) = Number of sending offs after a second yellow card; (red card) = Number of sending offs by a direct red card.

== Transfers ==
=== In ===
No.	Pos.	Nat.	Name	Age	EU	Moving from	Type	Transfer window	Ends	Transfer fee	Source
34	MF	(Bosnia and Herzegovina)	Nedim Mekić	30	Non-EU	Igman	Loan return	Summer	2016	Free	
7	MF	(Senegal)	Secouba Diatta	32	Non-EU	Zvijezda	Transfer	Summer	2017	Free	fkzeljeznicar.ba
17	DF	(Bosnia and Herzegovina)	Ivan Livaja	37	Non-EU	Vitez	Transfer	Summer	2017	Free	fkzeljeznicar.ba
35	MF	(Bosnia and Herzegovina)	Adnan Alihodžić	29	Non-EU	Youth system	Promotion	Summer	2018	Free	fkzeljeznicar.ba
36	MF	(Bosnia and Herzegovina)	Benjamin Šehić	28	Non-EU	Youth system	Promotion	Summer	2018	Free	fkzeljeznicar.ba
32	MF	(Bosnia and Herzegovina)	Muris Midžić	28	Non-EU	Youth system	Promotion	Summer	2018	Free	fkzeljeznicar.ba
4	MF	(Bosnia and Herzegovina)	Dino Hasanović	29	Non-EU	Youth system	Promotion	Summer	2018	Free	fkzeljeznicar.ba
11	MF	(Serbia)	Jovan Blagojević	37	Non-EU	Velež	Transfer	Summer	2017	Free	fkzeljeznicar.ba
37	DF	(Bosnia and Herzegovina)	Emir Hodžurda	34	Non-EU	Slavija	Transfer	Summer	2017	Free	fkzeljeznicar.ba
25	FW	(Brazil)	Tiago Farias	35	Non-EU	CENE (Brazil)	Transfer	Summer	2017	Free	fkzeljeznicar.ba
39	MF	(Bosnia and Herzegovina)	Denis Žerić	27	Non-EU	Youth system	Promotion	Summer	2018	Free	fkzeljeznicar.ba
16	DF	(Serbia)	Dušan Mladenović	34	Non-EU	Alashkert (Armenia)	Transfer	Summer	2017	Free	fkzeljeznicar.ba
14	FW	(Bosnia and Herzegovina)	Joco Stokić	38	Non-EU	Borac Banja Luka	Transfer	Summer	2017	Free	fkzeljeznicar.ba
32	MF	(Bosnia and Herzegovina)	Muris Midžić	28	Non-EU	Goražde	Loan return	Winter	2018	N/A	fkzeljeznicar.ba
7	DF	(Croatia)	Mirko Kramarić	36	EU	Haugesund (Norway)	Transfer	Winter	2018	Free	fkzeljeznicar.ba
90	MF	(Brazil)	Mailson	35	Non-EU	Colo Colo (Brazil)	Transfer	Winter	2018	Free	fkzeljeznicar.ba
2	DF	(Serbia)	Siniša Stevanović	36	Non-EU	Novi Pazar (Serbia)	Transfer	Winter	2018	Free	fkzeljeznicar.ba
24	FW	(Croatia)	Ivan Lendrić	33	EU	Kerkyra (Greece)	Transfer	Winter	2017	Free	fkzeljeznicar.ba
10	MF	(Bosnia and Herzegovina)	Samir Bekrić	40	Non-EU	Bunyodkor (Germany)	Transfer	Winter	2019	Free	fkzeljeznicar.ba
17	MF	(Sweden)	Mirza Halvadžić	29	EU	IFK Norrköping (Sweden)	Transfer	Winter	2018	Free	fkzeljeznicar.ba
15	DF	(Bosnia and Herzegovina)	Jadranko Bogičević	42	Non-EU	Olimpic	Transfer	Winter	2018	Free	fkzeljeznicar.ba
8	MF	(Bosnia and Herzegovina)	Nermin Zolotić	31	Non-EU	Gent (Belgium)	Loan	Winter	2016	N/A	fkzeljeznicar.ba
14	FW	(Slovenia)	Dejan Djermanović	36	EU	Olimpija (Slovenia)	Transfer	Winter	2018	Free	fkzeljeznicar.ba
88	MF	(Bosnia and Herzegovina)	Miroslav Stevanović	34	Non-EU	Ergotelis (Greece)	Transfer	Winter	2017	Free	fkzeljeznicar.ba
1	GK	(Bosnia and Herzegovina)	Irfan Fejzić	38	Non-EU	Olimpic	Transfer	Winter	2018	Free	fkzeljeznicar.ba
16	MF	(Bosnia and Herzegovina)	Srđan Stanić	35	EU	Olimpic	Transfer	Winter	2018	Free	fkzeljeznicar.ba
44	MF	(Bosnia and Herzegovina)	Adnan Zahirović	35	Non-EU	Hapoel Acre (Israel)	Transfer	Winter	2018	Free	fkzeljeznicar.ba

Total expenditure: ▼

=== Out ===
No.	Pos.	Nat.	Name	Age	EU	Moving to	Type	Transfer window	Transfer fee	Source
16	FW	(Argentina)	Juan Varea	39	Non-EU	Cherno More (Bulgaria)	End of contract	Summer	Free	fkzeljeznicar.ba
21	DF	(Serbia)	Mladen Zeljković	37	Non-EU	SC Waterloo Region (Canada)	End of contract	Summer	Free	fkzeljeznicar.ba
44	MF	(Bosnia and Herzegovina)	Eldar Hasanović	35	Non-EU	Bnei Sakhnin (Israel)	End of contract	Summer	Free	fkzeljeznicar.ba
11	MF	(Bosnia and Herzegovina)	Srđan Stanić	35	EU	Olimpic	End of contract	Summer	Free	fkzeljeznicar.ba
2	FW	(Bosnia and Herzegovina)	Anes Nuspahić	32	Non-EU	Velež	End of contract	Summer	Free	fkzeljeznicar.ba
7	MF	(Bosnia and Herzegovina)	Sead Bučan	42	Non-EU	Čelik	End of contract	Summer	Free	fkzeljeznicar.ba
19	DF	(Bosnia and Herzegovina)	Benjamin Čolić	33	Non-EU	Čelik	End of contract	Summer	Free	fkzeljeznicar.ba
34	MF	(Bosnia and Herzegovina)	Nedim Mekić	30	Non-EU	Travnik	Contract termination	Summer	Free	
35	MF	(Bosnia and Herzegovina)	Dino Hasković	29	Non-EU	Slavija	Contract termination	Summer	Free	
3	DF	(Bosnia and Herzegovina)	Josip Kvesić	34	EU	Antalyaspor (Turkey)	Transfer	Summer	€115.000	fkzeljeznicar.ba
32	MF	(Bosnia and Herzegovina)	Muris Midžić	28	Non-EU	Goražde	Loan	Summer	Free	
37	MF	(Bosnia and Herzegovina)	Senad Kašić	30	Non-EU	Igman	Contract termination	Summer	Free	
8	FW	(Bosnia and Herzegovina)	Riad Bajić	30	Non-EU	Konyaspor (Turkey)	Transfer	Summer	€500.000	fkzeljeznicar.ba
16	DF	(Serbia)	Dušan Mladenović	34	Non-EU	Iskra Danilovgrad (Montenegro)	Contract termination	Winter	Free	fkzeljeznicar.ba
14	FW	(Bosnia and Herzegovina)	Joco Stokić	38	Non-EU	Radnik	Contract termination	Winter	Free	fkzeljeznicar.ba
7	MF	(Senegal)	Secouba Diatta	32	Non-EU	Bratstvo Gračanica	Contract termination	Winter	Free	fkzeljeznicar.ba
2	DF	(Serbia)	Dejan Uzelac	31	Non-EU	Olimpic	Contract termination	Winter	Free	fkzeljeznicar.ba
17	DF	(Bosnia and Herzegovina)	Ivan Livaja	37	Non-EU	Vitez	Contract termination	Winter	Free	fkzeljeznicar.ba
34	FW	(Bosnia and Herzegovina)	Zoran Kokot	39	Non-EU	Mladost Podgorica (Montenegro)	Contract termination	Winter	Free	fkzeljeznicar.ba
36	MF	(Bosnia and Herzegovina)	Benjamin Šehić	28	Non-EU	Bratstvo Gračanica	Loan	Winter	N/A	fkzeljeznicar.ba
35	DF	(Bosnia and Herzegovina)	Adnan Alihodžić	29	Non-EU	Bratstvo Gračanica	Loan	Winter	N/A	fkzeljeznicar.ba
32	MF	(Bosnia and Herzegovina)	Muris Midžić	28	Non-EU	Goražde	Loan	Winter	N/A	fkzeljeznicar.ba
1	GK	(Croatia)	Marijan Antolović	35	EU	Hapoel Haifa (Israel)	Transfer	Winter	Free	fkzeljeznicar.ba
15	MF	(Bosnia and Herzegovina)	Ognjen Đelmić	36	Non-EU	Debrecen (Hungary)	End of contract	Winter	Free	
18	MF	(Bosnia and Herzegovina)	Amir Hadžiahmetović	28	Non-EU	Konyaspor (Turkey)	Transfer	Winter	€500.000	fkzeljeznicar.ba
23	MF	(Bosnia and Herzegovina)	Amer Hiroš	28	Non-EU	Goražde	Loan	Winter	N/A	fkzeljeznicar.ba
33	MF	(Bosnia and Herzegovina)	Edin Hadžović	30	Non-EU	Goražde	Loan	Winter	N/A	fkzeljeznicar.ba
22	DF	(Bosnia and Herzegovina)	Jasmin Bogdanović	34	Non-EU	Free agent	Contract termination	Mid-season	Free	

Total income: ▲€1.115.000

== Club ==
=== Coaching staff ===
Name	Role
(Bosnia and Herzegovina) Edis Mulalić	Head coach
(Bosnia and Herzegovina) Vacant	Assistant coach
(Bosnia and Herzegovina) Vacant	Fitness coach
(Bosnia and Herzegovina) Elvis Karić	Goalkeeping coach
(Bosnia and Herzegovina) Haris Alihodžić	Team manager
(Bosnia and Herzegovina) Erdijan Pekić	Commissioner for Security
(Bosnia and Herzegovina) Zlatko Dervišević	Doctor
(Bosnia and Herzegovina) Edin Kulenović	Doctor
(Bosnia and Herzegovina) Raif Zeba	Physiotherapist
(Bosnia and Herzegovina) Mirza Halvadžija	Physiotherapist

=== Other information ===
Honorary Chairman of the Club	(Bosnia and Herzegovina) Ivica Osim
Chairman of the Assembly	(Bosnia and Herzegovina) Ermin Pešto
Chairman of the Supervisory Board	(Bosnia and Herzegovina) Senad Misimović
Chairman of the Board	(Bosnia and Herzegovina) Vedran Vukotić
Director	(Bosnia and Herzegovina) Mirsad Šiljak
Team manager	(Bosnia and Herzegovina) Haris Alihodžić
Head coach	(Bosnia and Herzegovina) Haris Alihodžić (Interim)
Ground (capacity and dimensions)	Grbavica Stadium (12,000 / 105x66 m)

Source: Željezničar and Grbavica Stadium

== Competitions ==
=== Pre-season ===
22 June 2015	Međugorje (Bosnia and Herzegovina)	1–7	(Bosnia and Herzegovina) Željezničar	Međugorje, Bosnia and Herzegovina
18:00	Vasilj 70' (pen.)	Report	Bajić 29' (pen.); Kokot 45'; Tiago 61', 75', 83'; Hiroš 78'; Diatta 86'	Stadium: Stadion Međugorje

25 June 2015	Zrinjski (Bosnia and Herzegovina)	1–1	(Bosnia and Herzegovina) Željezničar	Mostar, Bosnia and Herzegovina
18:00	Nikolić 10'	Report	Diatta 87'	Stadium: Stadion pod Bijelim Brijegom

=== Mid-season ===
21 January 2016	Željezničar (Bosnia and Herzegovina)	4–0	(Bosnia and Herzegovina) Brotnjo	Međugorje, Bosnia and Herzegovina
14:00 CET	Tiago 3'; Bekrić 30', 43' (pen.); Hodžurda 70'	Report		Stadium: Sports Centre Circle

26 January 2016	Željezničar (Bosnia and Herzegovina)	0–1	(Bosnia and Herzegovina) Čapljina	Međugorje, Bosnia and Herzegovina
15:00 CET		Report	Jazvin 58'	Stadium: Sports Centre Circle

29 January 2016	Željezničar (Bosnia and Herzegovina)	1–0	(Bosnia and Herzegovina) Velež	Međugorje, Bosnia and Herzegovina
14:00 CET	Beganović 89'	Report		Stadium: Sports Centre Circle

3 February 2016	Željezničar (Bosnia and Herzegovina)	3–0	(Bosnia and Herzegovina) Vitez	Sarajevo, Bosnia and Herzegovina
14:00 CET	Djermanović 20'; Lendrić 81'; Mujagić 89'	Report		Stadium: Extra Ground Grbavica Stadium

7 February 2016	Željezničar (Bosnia and Herzegovina)	4–1	(Bosnia and Herzegovina) Žepče	Sarajevo, Bosnia and Herzegovina
13:00 CET	Mujagić 2'; Lendrić 18', 42'; Beganović 61'	Report	Babić 88'	Stadium: Extra Ground Grbavica Stadium

11 February 2016	Željezničar (Bosnia and Herzegovina)	0–0	(Slovakia) DAC Dunajská Streda	Antalya, Turkey
14:00 CET		Report		Stadium: Miracle Football Centre

15 February 2016	Željezničar (Bosnia and Herzegovina)	0–0	(Denmark) Vendsyssel	Antalya, Turkey
16:00 CET		Report		Stadium: Papillon Sports Center

18 February 2016	Željezničar (Bosnia and Herzegovina)	1–0	(Ukraine) Illichivets Mariupol	Antalya, Turkey
16:00 CET	Lendrić 3'			Stadium: TBD

17 March 2016	Željezničar (Bosnia and Herzegovina)	4–0	(Bosnia and Herzegovina) Pofalićki	Sarajevo, Bosnia and Herzegovina
	Bijedić 24'; Ajkunić 43', 55', 57'	Report		Stadium: Extra Ground Grbavica Stadium

=== Overall ===
Competition	Started round	Final result	First match	Last Match
2015–16 Premier League of Bosnia and Herzegovina	—	5th	26 July 2015	14 May 2016
2015–16 Bosnia and Herzegovina Football Cup	Round of 32	Semi-finals	23 Sept 2015	20 April 2016
2015–16 UEFA Europa League	Q1	Q3	30 June 2015	6 Aug 2015

=== Premijer Liga BiH ===
Pos	Team	Pld	W	D	L	GF	GA	GD	Pts	Qualification or relegation
3	Široki Brijeg	30	18	7	5	56	21	+35	61	Qualification for the Europa League first qualifying round
4	Sarajevo	30	18	3	9	56	28	+28	57	
5	Željezničar	30	16	7	7	36	20	+16	55	
6	Čelik Zenica	30	12	10	8	35	28	+7	46	
7	Radnik Bijeljina	30	13	6	11	25	25	0	45	Qualification for the Europa League first qualifying round (Note: Radnik Bijeljina qualified for the Europa League first qualifying round by winning the 2015–16 Bosnia and Herzegovina Football Cup.)

Source: UEFA, Soccerway
Rules for classification: 1) Points; 2) Goal difference; 3) Goals scored; 4) Head-to-head points; 5) Head-to-head goal difference; 6) Head-to-head away goals (only if two teams); 7) Head-to-head goals scored; 8) Goal difference; 9) Play-off. (Criteria 2 and 3 are not used to decide champion, UEFA competition qualification, or relegation)

==== Results summary ====
Overall								Home						Away					
Pld	W	D	L	GF	GA	GD	Pts	W	D	L	GF	GA	GD	W	D	L	GF	GA	GD
30	16	7	7	36	20	+16	55	10	4	1	25	9	+16	6	3	6	11	11	0

Last updated: 7 May 2016.
Source: sportsport.ba

==== Results by round ====
Round	1	2	3	4	5	6	7	8	9	10	11	12	13	14	15	16	17	18	19	20	21	22	23	24	25	26	27	28	29	30
Ground	A	H	A	A	H	A	H	A	H	A	H	A	H	A	H	H	A	H	H	A	H	A	H	A	H	A	H	A	H	A
Result	L	L	W	D	W	L	D	W	W	L	W	L	W	L	D	W	D	W	W	W	W	W	W	W	W	W	D	L	D	D
Position	11	14	10	10	9	10	11	8	7	8	6	8	6	7	9	8	8	6	6	6	6	5	5	5	5	4	4	5	5	5

Updated to match(es) played on 7 May 2016. Source: Competitions
A = Away; H = Home; W = Win; D = Draw; L = Loss

==== Matches ====
26 July 2015 1	Borac Banja Luka	1–0	Željezničar	Banja Luka
20:00	Radinović (yellow card) 28'; Ilić 33', (yellow card) 34'; Bečelić (yellow card) 53'	Report	D. Sadiković (yellow card) 18'; Bogdanović (yellow card) 61'	Stadium: Banja Luka City Stadium; Attendance: 3,500; Referee: Edin Jakupović (Bihać)

2 August 2015 2	Željezničar	1–2	Radnik	Sarajevo
17:30	Bajić (yellow card) 12'; D. Sadiković 55'; Kokot (yellow card) 90'	Report	Žižović (yellow card) 18'; I. Jakovljević (yellow card) 56'; S. Jakovljević (yellow card) 63'; Šećerović (yellow card) 67'; Obradović 82'; Maksimović 90+2'	Stadium: Grbavica Stadium; Attendance: 3,500; Referee: Darko Obradović (Stolac)

9 August 2015 3	Vitez	0–1	Željezničar	Vitez
17:00	Grebenar (yellow card) 84'; Barišić (yellow card) 90'	Report	Kokot (yellow card) 12'; Memija (yellow card) 61'; Beganović (yellow card) 81'; E. Sadiković 90'	Stadium: Gradski stadion Attendance: 2,000; Referee: Dragan Skakić (Gradiška)

16 August 2015 4	Široki Brijeg	1–1	Željezničar	Široki Brijeg
20:00	Brekalo (yellow card) 45' (yellow-red card) 90'; Sesar (yellow card) 51'; Bralić (yellow card) 51'; Kožulj 72', (yellow card) 86'	Report	Antolović (red card) 17'; Đelmić 30', (yellow card) 51'; Beganović (yellow card) 53'; Memija (yellow card) 74'; Kjosevski (yellow card) 90'	Stadium: Pecara Stadium; Attendance: 2,500; Referee: Dragan Skakić (Gradiška)

23 August 2015 5	Željezničar	2–1	Velež	Sarajevo
17:00	Kokot 8'; Blagojević (yellow card) 33'; Kosorić (red card) 62'; Đelmić (yellow card) 64', (goal) 67'	Report	Nikolić (yellow card) 23'; Kodro (yellow card) 47' (yellow-red card) 64'; Haurdić 53'; Bobić (yellow card) 68'; Peco (yellow card) 74'; Matić (yellow card) 90+2'	Stadium: Grbavica Stadium; Attendance: 3,500; Referee: Goran Paradžik (Ljubuški)

30 August 2015 6	Mladost Doboj Kakanj	2–1	Željezničar	Zenica
17:00	Ramović (yellow card) 15'; Dilaver 63', 77'; Isaković (yellow card) 88'; Musić (yellow card) 90'	Report	Memija (yellow card) 52'; Hadžiahmetović 80'; Beganović (yellow card) 88'	Stadium: Stadion Kamberovića polje Attendance: 1,500; Referee: Edin Jakupović (Bihać)

9 September 2015 7	Željezničar	0–0	Sloboda Tuzla	Sarajevo
18:30		Report	Kostić (yellow card) 39'; Efendić (yellow card) 87'	Stadium: Grbavica Stadium; Attendance: 2,500; Referee: Tomislav Čuić (Tomislavgrad)

13 September 2015 8	Olimpic	0–1	Željezničar	Sarajevo
16:30	Muharemović (yellow card) 15'; Stanić (yellow card) 64'; Hadžić (yellow card) 69'; Handžić (yellow card) 74'; Regoje (yellow card) 80'	Report	Kokot 21', (yellow card) 90'; Hasanović (yellow card) 84'	Stadium: Asim Ferhatović Hase Stadium; Attendance: 1,200; Referee: Irfan Peljto (Sarajevo)

20 September 2015 9	Željezničar	3–2	Drina Zvornik	Sarajevo
16:00	Đelmić 34', 37'; Kosorić (yellow card) 51'; Blagojević 80'	Report	Ilić 53'; Jakšić 69'; Đerić (yellow card) 78'; Erić (yellow card) 81'; Ćulum (yellow card) 87'	Stadium: Grbavica Stadium; Attendance: 2,500; Referee: Dragan Petrović (Banja Luka)

27 September 2015 10	Travnik	2–0	Željezničar	Travnik
15:30	Aleksić 15'; Šivšić 21'; Kovač (yellow card) 40'; Terzić (yellow card) 61'; Hasanhodžić (yellow card) 69'; Čivić (yellow card) 70'	Report	E. Sadiković (yellow card) 58'; Beganović (yellow card) 74'	Stadium: Stadion Pirota; Referee: Elvis Mujić (Banovići)

4 October 2015 11	Željezničar	1–0	Sarajevo	Sarajevo
15:30	Tiago 25'; Bogdanović (yellow card) 32'; Antolović (yellow card) 90'; Hasanović (yellow card) 90+6'; Mladenović (yellow card) 90+8'	Report	Puzigaća (yellow card) 34'; Delač (yellow card) 63'; Tatomirović (yellow card) 90+1'	Stadium: Grbavica Stadium Attendance:9,500; Referee: Ognjen Valjić (Banja Luka)

17 October 2015 12	Zrinjski	2–1	Željezničar	Mostar
15:30	Peko (yellow card) 40'; Mešanović (yellow card) 73'; Todorović 86'; Šćepanović (yellow card) 90'; Filipović 90+5', (yellow card) 90+6'	Report	Hadžiahmetović (yellow card) 19'; Tiago 33', (yellow card) 54'; Memija (yellow card) 43'; Mladenović (yellow card) 50' (yellow-red card) 85'	Stadium: Bijeli Brijeg Stadium; Attendance: 2,000; Referee: Dragan Skakić (Gradiška)

25 October 2015 13	Željezničar	4–0	Čelik	Sarajevo
14:30	Hadžiahmetović (yellow card) 38'; Kokot 47'; Tiago 52', 58'; Mujagić 88'	Report	Bureković (yellow card) 44'; Salčinović (yellow card) 81'	Stadium: Grbavica Stadium; Attendance: 3,500; Referee: Edin Jakupović (Bihać)

1 November 2015 14	Rudar Prijedor	1–0	Željezničar	Prijedor
13:30	Mrkić 2', (yellow card) 2'; Arežina (yellow card) 43'; Pejić (yellow card) 47'; Milutinović (yellow card) 61'; Kunić (yellow card) 77'	Report	Blagojević (yellow card) 21'; Memija (yellow card) 66'; Hadžiahmetović (yellow card) 76'; Hodžurda (yellow card) 81'	Stadium: Gradski stadion Attendance: 800; Referee: Elvis Mujić (Banovići)

8 November 2015 15	Željezničar	0–0	Slavija	Sarajevo
13:00	Stokić (yellow card) 70'; E. Sadiković (red card) 73'	Report	Lučić (yellow card) 14'; Kartal (yellow card) 15'; Grujičić (yellow card) 27'	Stadium: Grbavica Stadium; Attendance: 2,000; Referee: Zoran Grbić (Prijedor)

23 November 2015 16	Željezničar	1–0	Borac Banja Luka	Sarajevo
13:00	Tiago 11'; Kokot (yellow card) 27'; Kosorić (yellow card) 66'; Mladenović (yellow card) 81'	Report	Bečelić (yellow card) 26'; Paštar (yellow card) 46'; Savanović (yellow card) 77'	Stadium: Grbavica Stadium; Attendance: 1,000; Referee: Edin Jakupović (Bihać)

29 November 2015 17	Radnik	0–0	Željezničar	Bijeljina
13:00	Seratlić (yellow card) 38'; Ostojić (yellow card) 56'; Antić (yellow card) 72'; Maksimović (yellow card) 87'; Jakovljević (yellow card) 89'	Report	Đelmić (red card) 56'; Beganović (yellow card) 68'; Stokić (yellow card) 84'	Stadium: Gradski stadion Attendance: 1,200; Referee: Elvis Mujić (Banovići)

6 December 2015 18	Željezničar	3–0	Vitez	Sarajevo
13:00	Mladenović (yellow card) 37'; Beganović 47'; Mujagić 76'; Hadžiahmetović 90+3'	Report	Šantić (yellow card) 19'; Kapelan (yellow card) 53'; Barišić (red card) 69'	Stadium: Grbavica Stadium; Attendance: 2,500; Referee: Goran Paradžik (Ljubuški)

28 February 2016 19	Željezničar	2–0	Široki Brijeg	Sarajevo
16:30	Lendrić 20'; Kramarić (yellow card) 32'; M. Stevanović (yellow card) 51'; Bogičević (yellow card) 71'; Bekrić 85'	Report	Krstanović (yellow card) 90'	Stadium: Grbavica Stadium; Attendance: 10,000; Referee: Ognjen Valjić (Banja Luka)

5 March 2016 20	Velež	0–1	Željezničar	Mostar
15:00	Alikadić (yellow card) 34'; Isić (yellow card) 41'; Kodro (yellow card) 60'; Lukomirak (yellow card) 60'; Ćemalović (yellow card) 61'	Report	Bekrić 61' (pen.); S. Stevanović (yellow card) 77'	Stadium: Vrapčići Stadium; Attendance: 2,800; Referee: Ermin Sivac (Zenica)

13 March 2016 21	Željezničar	2–1	Mladost Doboj Kakanj	Sarajevo
15:00	Bogičević 9'; S. Stevanović (yellow card) 43'	Report	Kobilica (yellow card) 7' ? 33' (o.g.); Čović 40', (yellow card) 44'; Musić (yellow card) 50'; Ramović (yellow card) 60'	Stadium: Grbavica Stadium; Attendance: 5,500; Referee: Goran Paradžik (Ljubuški)

19 March 2016 22	Sloboda Tuzla	0–1	Željezničar	Tuzla
15:00	Stjepanović (yellow card) 36'; Ahmetović (yellow card) 90+2'	Report	Hodžurda (yellow card) 26'; Lendrić 53'; M. Stevanović (yellow card) 68'; Stanić (yellow card) 78'; Kjosevski (yellow card) 90'	Stadium: Tušanj Stadium; Attendance: 8,000; Referee: Edin Jakupović (Bihać)

2 April 2016 23	Željezničar	3–1	Olimpic	Sarajevo
16:00	S. Stevanović (yellow card) 19'; Lendrić 35', 49', 72'; Kjosevski (yellow card) 55'; Kosorić (yellow card) 66'; Zahirović (yellow card) 73'	Report	Handžić (yellow card) 14'; Vukomanović (yellow card) 16'; Hadžić 55' (pen.); Uzelac (yellow card) 82'	Stadium: Grbavica Stadium; Attendance: 6,000; Referee: Edin Jakupović (Bihać)

10 April 2016 24	Drina Zvornik	0–2	Željezničar	Zvornik
16:30	Jokić (yellow card) 62'	Report	M. Stevanović 45'; Lendrić 66'; Memija (yellow card) 70'; Blagojević (yellow card) 71'	Stadium: Gradski stadion Attendance: 600; Referee: Ilija Živković (Orašje)

16 April 2016 25	Željezničar	2–1	Travnik	Sarajevo
18:00	M. Stevanović 17'; Bekrić 31'; Lendrić (yellow card) 77'	Report	Zec 4', (yellow card) 12'; Kovač (yellow card) 12'; Kadrić (yellow card) 70'; Fazlić (yellow card) 83'	Stadium: Grbavica Stadium; Attendance: 5,000; Referee: Darko Obradović (Stolac)

24 April 2016 26	Sarajevo	0–1	Željezničar	Sarajevo
17:00	Rustemović (yellow card) 24'; Al. Bekić (yellow card) 26'; Benko (yellow card) 39'; Kovačević (yellow card) 45'; Am. Bekić (red card) 89'	Report	S. Stevanović (yellow card) 24'; M. Stevanović 45+1'; Kosorić (yellow card) 54'; Blagojević (yellow card) 90'	Stadium: Asim Ferhatović Hase Stadium; Attendance: 14,000; Referee: Edin Jakupović (Bihać)

29 April 2016 27	Željezničar	0–0	Zrinjski	Sarajevo
20:00	Stanić (yellow card) 10'; S. Stevanović (yellow card) 40'; Bekrić (yellow card) 45+1'	Report	Tomić (yellow card) 37'; Zakarić (yellow card) 64'; Filipović (yellow card) 75'; Karačić (yellow card) 78'	Stadium: Grbavica Stadium; Attendance: 8,500; Referee: Ognjen Valjić (Banja Luka)

4 May 2016 28	Čelik	1–0	Željezničar	Zenica
17:00	Salčinović (yellow card) 24', (goal) 35'; M. Popović (yellow card) 25'; Adilović (yellow card) 62'; Kojić (yellow card) 77'; Selimović (yellow card) 82'; Bajraktarević (yellow card) 90'	Report	Stanić (yellow card) 26'; Bogičević (yellow card) 41'; Blagojević (yellow card) 63'; Kjosevski (yellow card) 79'	Stadium: Bilino Polje Stadium; Attendance: 1,600; Referee: Tomislav Čuić Tomislavgrad

7 May 2016 29	Željezničar	1–1	Rudar Prijedor	Sarajevo
17:00	Beganović (yellow card) 23'; Hodžurda (yellow card) 53'; S. Stevanović (yellow card) 79'; Lendrić 90+1'	Report	Kozić (yellow card) 32'; Kantar (yellow card) 36'; Šodić (yellow card) 45+1'; Jakupović (yellow card) 68'; Rokvić 81'; Jovičić (yellow card) 81'; Kunić (yellow card) 86'	Stadium: Grbavica Stadium; Attendance: 2,000; Referee: Emir Spahalić Mostar

14 May 2016 30	Slavija	1–1	Željezničar	Istočno Sarajevo
17:00			M. Stevanović (yellow card) 20'	Stadium: Gradski SRC Slavija; Attendance: 1,000

=== Kup Bosne i Hercegovine ===
==== Round of 32 ====
23 September 2015	Željezničar	1–0	Krupa	Sarajevo
16:00	Bogdanović (yellow card) 52'; Livaja (yellow card) 59'; Đelmić 90+3' (pen.)	Report	Mazalica (yellow card) 50'; Dujaković (yellow card) 66'; Stjepanović (yellow card) 90'; Vuković (yellow card) 90+2'	Stadium: Grbavica Stadium; Attendance: 1,000; Referee: Darko Obradović (Stolac)

==== Round of 16 ====
21 October 2015 First leg	Željezničar	3–0	GOŠK Gabela	Sarajevo
15:30	E. Sadiković (yellow card) 23'; Đelmić 35', 56' (pen.); Šehić (yellow card) 37'; Beganović 75'	Report	Delić (yellow card) 48'; Marić (yellow card) 51'; Rodin (yellow card) 54'; Bošnjak (yellow card) 57'; Malčić (yellow card) 72'; Odak (yellow card) 60'	Stadium: Grbavica Stadium; Attendance: 700; Referee: Dušan Berak (Trebinje)

4 November 2015 Second leg	GOŠK Gabela	0–1 (0–4 agg.)	Željezničar	Gabela
13:30	Dalmatin (yellow card) 39'; Nikolić (yellow card) 49'; Đajić (yellow card) 60'; Marić (yellow card) 82'	Report	Kosorić 12'; Mujagić (yellow card) 60'	Stadium: Podavala Stadium; Attendance: 50; Referee: Antoni Bandić (Grude)

==== Quarter-finals ====
9 March 2016 First leg	Borac Banja Luka	0–2	Željezničar	Banja Luka
18:00	Mance (yellow card) 83'; Radinović (yellow card) 84'	Report	Bekrić 12'; Lendrić 15'; Memija (yellow card) 62'; Blagojević (yellow card) 67' (yellow-red card) 78'	Stadium: Banja Luka City Stadium; Attendance: 3,000; Referee: Edin Jakupović (Bihać)

16 March 2016 Second leg	Željezničar	2–1 (4–1 agg.)	Borac Banja Luka	Sarajevo
18:00	M. Stevanović 7'; Djermanović 90+3'	Report	Đilas (yellow card) 21'; Marjanović (yellow card) 27', (goal) 88'; Petrović (yellow card) 63'; Predragović (yellow card) 76'	Stadium: Grbavica Stadium; Attendance: 5,000; Referee: Elvis Mujić (Banovići)

==== Semi-finals ====
13 April 2016 First leg	Željezničar	1–2	Sloboda Tuzla	Sarajevo
18:00	S. Stevanović (yellow card) 44'; Bogičević 61'	Report	Krpić 3'; Ivetić (yellow card) 11'; Kostić 70'; Merzić (yellow card) 72'; Sarić (yellow card) 77'	Stadium: Grbavica Stadium; Attendance: 8,500; Referee: Zoran Grbić (Prijedor)

20 April 2016 Second leg	Sloboda Tuzla	3–1 (5–2 agg.)	Željezničar	Tuzla
19:30	Merzić 28'; Krpić 39'; Sarić (yellow card) 49'; Kostić 79'; Veselinović (yellow card) 90'	Report	Lendrić 89' (pen.)	Stadium: Tušanj Stadium; Attendance: 6,500; Referee: Ognjen Valjić (Banja Luka)

=== UEFA Europa League ===
==== First qualifying round ====
30 June 2015 First leg	Balzan (Malta)	0–2	(Bosnia and Herzegovina) Željezničar	Paola, Malta
17:45	Agius (yellow card) 6'; Grioli (yellow card) 18'; Brincat (yellow card) 32'; Serrano (yellow card) 38'; Bilbao (yellow card) 63'	Report	Bajić 4' (pen.), 13'; D. Sadiković (yellow card) 67'	Stadium: Hibernians Stadium; Attendance: 627; Referee: Dennis Antamo (Finland)

9 July 2015 Second leg	Željezničar (Bosnia and Herzegovina)	1–0 (3–0 agg.)	(Malta) Balzan	Sarajevo, Bosnia and Herzegovina
21:15	Memija (yellow card) 22'; D. Sadiković 68'	Report	Guobadia (yellow card) 37'; Fanech (yellow card) 61'; Serrano (yellow card) 68'	Stadium: Asim Ferhatović Hase Stadium; Attendance: 5,500; Referee: Vasilis Dimitriou (Cyprus)

==== Second qualifying round ====
16 July 2015 First leg	Ferencváros (Hungary)	0–1	(Bosnia and Herzegovina) Željezničar	Budapest, Hungary
20:30	Šesták (yellow card) 86'	Report	Đelmić (yellow card) 42'; E. Sadiković (yellow card) 80'; Beganović 90'; Diatta (yellow card) 90+1'	Stadium: Groupama Arena; Attendance: 8,853; Referee: Gunnar Jarl Jónsson (Iceland)

23 July 2015 Second leg	Željezničar (Bosnia and Herzegovina)	2–0 (3–0 agg.)	(Hungary) Ferencváros	Sarajevo, Bosnia and Herzegovina
18:00	Kokot 23'; Hadžiahmetović (yellow card) 38'; Đelmić 90+1'	Report	Radó (yellow card) 49'; Gera (yellow card) 84'	Stadium: Asim Ferhatović Hase Stadium; Attendance: 16,000; Referee: Orel Grinfeeld (Israel)

==== Third qualifying round ====
30 July 2015 First leg	Standard Liège (Belgium)	2–1	(Bosnia and Herzegovina) Željezničar	Liège, Belgium
20:30	Kosorić 16' (o.g.); Knockaert 28', (yellow card) 28'	Report	Kokot (yellow card) 13'; Đelmić 64'; Hadžiahmetović (yellow card) 68'	Stadium: Stade Maurice Dufrasne; Attendance: 11,608; Referee: Arnold Hunter (Northern Ireland)

6 August 2015 Second leg	Željezničar (Bosnia and Herzegovina)	0–1 (1–3 agg.)	(Belgium) Standard Liège	Sarajevo, Bosnia and Herzegovina
20:00	Mladenović (yellow card) 65'	Report	Van Damme (yellow card) 12', (goal) 68'	Stadium: Asim Ferhatović Hase Stadium; Attendance: 25,000; Referee: Georgi Kabakov (Bulgaria)

=== UEFA Youth League ===
==== Players ====
N	Pos.	Nat.	Name	Age	EU	Since	App	Goals	Ends	Transfer fee	Notes
1	GK	(Bosnia and Herzegovina)	Emir Ćutahija	27	Non-EU	—	2	0	—	Youth system	
2	DF	(Bosnia and Herzegovina)	Adnan Alihodžić	29	Non-EU	—	2	0	—	Youth system	
3	DF	(Bosnia and Herzegovina)	Semir Džuho	27	Non-EU	—	1	0	—	Youth system	
5	DF	(Bosnia and Herzegovina)	Kemal Osmanković	28	Non-EU	—	2	0	—	Youth system	
6	MF	(Bosnia and Herzegovina)	Kerim Palić	28	Non-EU	—	2	0	—	Youth system	
7	MF	(Bosnia and Herzegovina)	Amer Hiroš	28	Non-EU	—	2	0	—	Youth system	
9	FW	(Bosnia and Herzegovina)	Adel Ajkunić	27	Non-EU	—	2	0	—	Youth system	
11	FW	(Bosnia and Herzegovina)	Ajdin Mujagić	27	Non-EU	—	2	1	—	Youth system	
13	DF	(Bosnia and Herzegovina)	Almir Čubara	28	Non-EU	—	2	0	—	Youth system	
14	DF	(Bosnia and Herzegovina)	Ismail Duraković	28	Non-EU	—	2	0	—	Youth system	
16	MF	(Bosnia and Herzegovina)	Mirza Šubo	27	Non-EU	—	1	0	—	Youth system	
17	MF	(Bosnia and Herzegovina)	Alin Sarać	28	Non-EU	—	1	0	—	Youth system	
18	MF	(Bosnia and Herzegovina)	Haris Rizvanović	27	Non-EU	—	2	0	—	Youth system	
20	MF	(Bosnia and Herzegovina)	Benjamin Šehić	26	Non-EU	—	1	0	—	Youth system	
21	MF	(Bosnia and Herzegovina)	Vahidin Alešević	27	Non-EU	—	2	0	—	Youth system	
25	MF	(Bosnia and Herzegovina)	Haris Hajdarević	26	Non-EU	—	2	1	—	Youth system	

- Last updated: 14 October 2015
- Source: uefa.com and footballdatabase.com (for EU passport)

Total squad cost: €1.25M

==== First round ====
30 September 2015 First leg	Red Bull Salzburg (Austria)	4–0	(Bosnia and Herzegovina) Željezničar	Grödig, Austria
18:00	Oberlin 19'; Raischl 27'; Sobczyk (yellow card) 37'; Laimer (yellow card) 45+2'; Hödl 67'; Grabovac 75'	Report	Mujagić (yellow card) 60'; Ajkunić (yellow card) 88'; Hiroš (yellow card) 90+4'	Stadium: Untersberg-Arena; Referee: Zbynek Proske (Czech Republic)

14 October 2015 Second leg	Željezničar (Bosnia and Herzegovina)	2–1 (2–5 agg.)	(Austria) Red Bull Salzburg	Sarajevo, Bosnia and Herzegovina
20:00	Mujagić 7', (yellow card) 7'; Hajdarević 27'; Alihodžić (yellow card) 54'; Hiroš (yellow card) 72'; Sarać (yellow card) 89'; Osmanković (yellow card) 90'	Report	Gugganig (yellow card) 50'; Karić (yellow card) 59'; Hodl 82'	Stadium: Grbavica Stadium; Attendance: 1,000; Referee: Bartosz Frankowski (Poland)
