= Slavko Petrović =

Serbian football manager (born 1958)

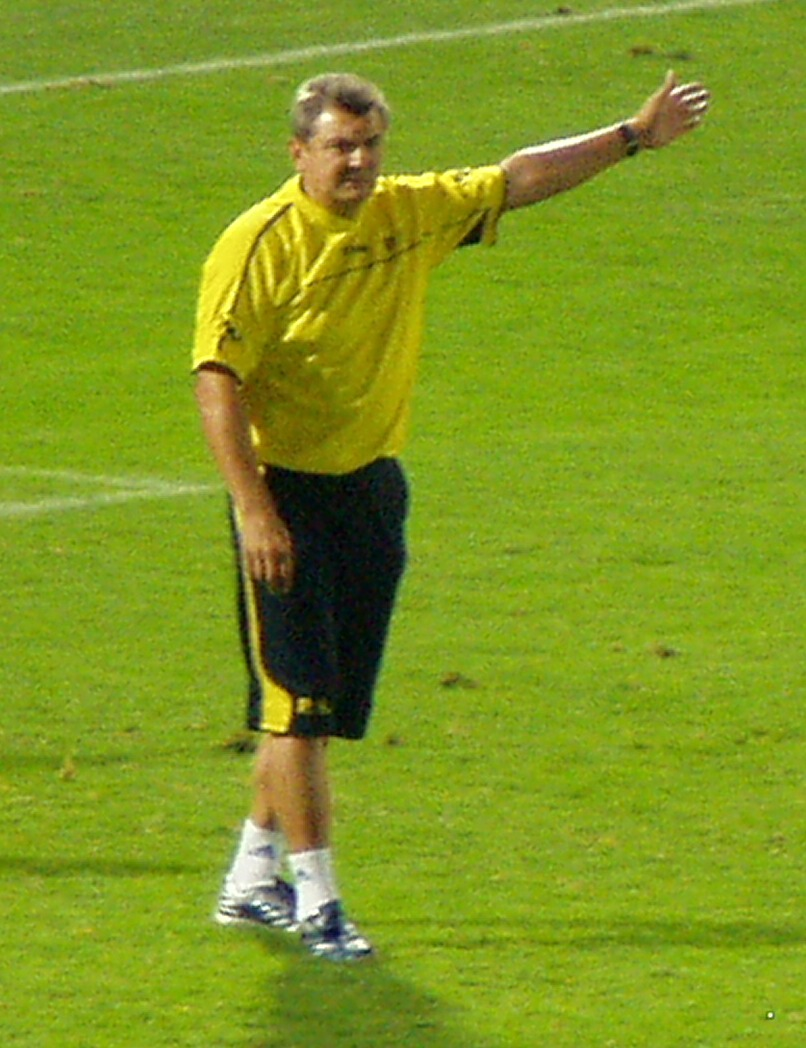
- Petrović as Zalaegerszegi manager in 2007

Personal information
- Date of birth: 10 August 1958 (age 68)
- Place of birth: Belgrade, FPR Yugoslavia
- Position: Goalkeeper

Youth career
- 1968–1972: Bežanija
- 1972–1979: Red Star Belgrade

Senior career*
Years	Team	Apps	(Gls)
1979	Red Star Belgrade	0	(0)
1980	Fortuna Düsseldorf	0	(0)
1980–1981	Rot-Weiss Essen	0	(0)
1981–1982	Wormatia Worms		
1982–1987	Olympia Lampertheim		
1987–1990	Amicitia Viernheim		

Managerial career
- 1992–1996: Alemannia Groß-Rohrheim
- 1996–1997: Amicitia Viernheim
- 1997–1998: Karlsruher SC (assistant)
- 1998–1999: Darmstadt 98
- 1999–2001: Carl Zeiss Jena
- 2002–2003: Fortuna Düsseldorf
- 2005: Waldhof Mannheim
- 2007–2008: Zalaegerszegi
- 2011: Borac Čačak
- 2011: Rad
- 2011–2012: Borac Čačak
- 2014–2016: Radnik Bijeljina
- 2016–2017: Željezničar
- 2017–2018: Sloboda Tuzla
- 2020: Radnik Bijeljina
- 2020–2021: Olimpik
- 2022: Spartak Subotica
- 2024: Tuzla City
- * Club domestic league appearances and goals

Slavko Petrović (Serbian Cyrillic: Славко Петровић; born 10 August 1958) is a Serbian professional football manager and former player.

== Playing career ==
Petrović was a goalkeeper at Red Star Belgrade. Although he made no league appearances for them, he went to Germany, where he spent most of his career playing with Fortuna Düsseldorf, Rot-Weiss Essen and Wormatia Worms. He won the 1979–80 DFB-Pokal while playing for Fortuna Düsseldorf.

== Managerial career ==
=== Early career ===
During the late 1990s, Petrović became a manager in Germany, getting the job of assistant manager at Karlsruher SC in 1997 after coaching Alemannia Groß-Rohrheim and Amicitia Viernheim earlier. In the following season, he moved to SV Darmstadt 98 where he became the main manager. Until 2006, he was the manager of Carl Zeiss Jena, Fortuna Düsseldorf and Waldhof Mannheim. During the season 2007–08, he was coaching Zalaegerszegi in Hungary.

In January 2011, Petrović returned to Serbia and became the manager of SuperLiga club Borac Čačak. At the start of the 2011–12 season, he became the coach of Rad.

=== Radnik Bijeljina ===
On 5 September 2014, Petrović became the new manager of Bosnian Premier League club Radnik Bijeljina. He won the Bosnian cup with Radnik in the 2015–16 season, making that the club's highest achievement in its history.

=== Željezničar ===
==== 2016–17 season ====
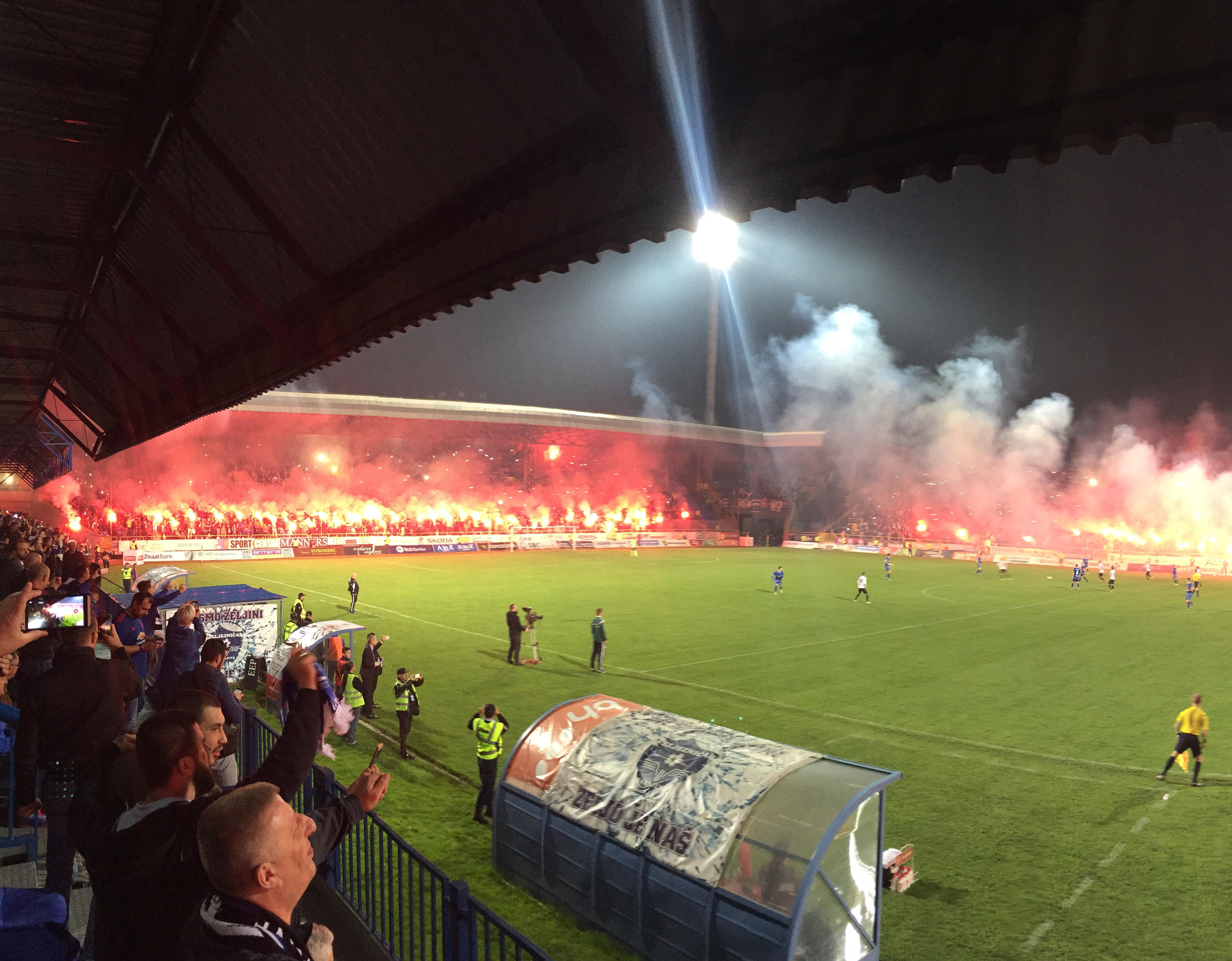
Petrović managing Željezničar at Grbavica Stadium in April 2017

Petrović replaced Miloš Kostić as Željezničar manager after a terrible start to the 2016–17 season where the club was winless in four consecutive matches, three of which were lost (two at home) and without scoring a single goal. Since Petrović arrived, he guided the club to the 2017–18 UEFA Europa League Second qualifying round, having lost only two games in the league out of 25 games played (scoring 2.16 goals per game). At one point the club managed to stay top of the league for five weeks, but ultimately finished second overall due to a dubious penalty decision in injury time (game Radnik Bijeljina vs Zrinjski Mostar 1–2; while at the same time Sarajevo beat Željezničar in the Sarajevo derby 1–0), allowing Zrinjski to overtake Željezničar and win the Bosnian championship; a first domestic title for, Zrinjski manager at the time, Blaž Slišković, with Željezničar a point behind.

Throughout the league, Željezničar played simultaneously in the 2016–17 Bosnian Cup, where they were eliminated in the semifinals stage to the eventual cup winner Široki Brijeg. Under Petrović, Željezničar forward Ivan Lendrić finished as top goalscorer of the league with 19 scored goals.

==== 2017–18 season ====
Petrović received support to remain as Željezničar for the next season. However just one day before the start of the season and the league match against GOŠK Gabela, Petrović was sacked.

=== Sloboda Tuzla ===
In September 2017, Petrović was named the new manager of Sloboda Tuzla, after Vlado Jagodić left the club. He led Sloboda to the 2017–18 Bosnian cup semi-final, where the club lost to eventual cup winners Željezničar. Petrović also led Sloboda to a 10th-place finish in the league. Before the beginning of the 2018–19 season, Petrović left Sloboda.

=== Return to Radnik Bijeljina ===
On 13 January 2020, Petrović returned to Radnik Bijeljina 3 1/2 years after leaving the club back in the summer of 2016. In his first game back, Petrović's team drew against his former club Željezničar 0–0 in a league match on 22 February 2020. His first win since his return to Radnik came on 7 March 2020, a 5–1 home win against Zvijezda 09. Petrović decided to leave Radnik on 16 November 2020, saying that pressure and constant threats from fans forced him to make that decision.

=== Olimpik ===
On 12 December 2020, Petrović became the new manager of Olimpik. In his first league game as Olimpik manager, Petrović's team beat fis former club Radnik Bijeljina on the same day that he became manager. After the end of the 2020–21 season and Olimpik's relegation, Petrović left the club.

=== Spartak Subotica ===
On 18 April 2022, Petrović was appointed manager of Serbian SuperLiga side Spartak Subotica. He successfully led the club to safety from relegation in the remainder of the season. On 20 September 2022, Petrović left Spartak by mutual consent.

=== Tuzla City ===
On 8 January 2024, Petrović returned to the Bosnian Premier League, becoming manager of relegation threatened Tuzla City. His first match in charge was against Velež Mostar in the Bosnian Cup on 9 February 2024, which ended in a 3–2 defeat. Following two more league defeats to Borac Banja Luka and Posušje, Petrović recorded his first win as Tuzla City manager on 2 March 2024, a 2–0 home victory against Zvijezda 09. Following a 5–1 home defeat to Sarajevo on 29 March, he terminated his contract and left the club on 31 March.

== Managerial statistics ==
As of match played 29 March 2024

Managerial record by team and tenure
Team	From	To	Record				
Team	From	To	G	W	D	L	Win %
Darmstadt 98	1 July 1998	30 September 1999	13	4	3	6	30.77
Carl Zeiss Jena	29 November 1999	19 May 2001	55	22	12	21	40.00
Fortuna Düsseldorf	1 July 2002	5 May 2003	33	14	10	9	42.42
Waldhof Mannheim	7 January 2005	22 December 2005	34	14	7	13	41.18
Zalaegerszegi	1 July 2007	30 April 2008	27	11	5	11	40.74
Borac Čačak	10 January 2011	30 May 2011	15	6	5	4	40.00
Rad	31 May 2011	18 September 2011	9	4	1	4	44.44
Borac Čačak	3 October 2011	26 March 2012	16	4	5	7	25.00
Radnik Bijeljina	5 September 2014	23 August 2016	72	28	20	24	38.89
Željezničar	24 August 2016	23 July 2017	36	21	10	5	58.33
Sloboda Tuzla	11 September 2017	8 June 2018	29	10	8	11	34.48
Radnik Bijeljina	13 January 2020	16 November 2020	19	4	7	8	21.05
Olimpik	12 December 2020	30 June 2021	15	4	3	8	26.67
Spartak Subotica	18 April 2022	20 September 2022	17	5	5	7	29.41
Tuzla City	8 January 2024	31 March 2024	6	1	1	4	16.67
Total			396	152	102	142	38.38

== Honours ==
=== Player ===
Fortuna Düsseldorf

- DFB-Pokal: 1979–80

=== Manager ===
Radnik Bijeljina

- Bosnian Cup: 2015–16
