= Srđan Stanić =

Srđan Stanić may refer to:

- Srđan Stanić (footballer, born 1982), Serbian footballer
- Srđan Stanić (footballer, born 1989), Bosnian footballer
