= Srđan Stanić (footballer, born 1989) =

Bosnian footballer

Personal information
- Full name: Srđan Stanić
- Date of birth: 6 July 1989 (age 37)
- Place of birth: Sarajevo, SFR Yugoslavia
- Height: 1.80 m (5 ft 11 in)
- Position: Full-back

Team information
- Current team: Vareš
- Number: 5

Youth career
- –2005: Sarajevo
- 2005–2006: Slavija Sarajevo

Senior career*
Years	Team	Apps	(Gls)
2006–2007	Slavija Sarajevo	13	(0)
2007–2015	Željezničar	175	(7)
2015–2016	Olimpik	12	(1)
2016–2017	Željezničar	39	(1)
2018	Zrinjski Mostar	5	(0)
2019–2020	Željezničar	22	(0)
2020–2021	Igman Konjic	7	(0)
2026	Omladinac Doglodi	1	(2)
2026-	Vareš	0	(0)

International career
2005–2006	Bosnia and Herzegovina U17	10	(6)
2007–2008	Bosnia and Herzegovina U19	9	(4)
2011	Bosnia and Herzegovina (unofficial)	1	(0)
- * Club domestic league appearances and goals as of 14 November 2020

Srđan Stanić (Bosnian pronunciation: [sř̩dʑan stǎːnitɕ]; born 6 July 1989) is a Bosnian professional footballer who plays as a full-back for Second League of the Federation of Bosnia and Herzegovina club NK Vareš.

He is well known for winning the Goal of the week video poll on Goal.com ahead of other big names like Zlatan Ibrahimović and Raul for his 35-meter goal against Rudar Prijedor while a part of Željezničar.

== Club career ==
=== Early career ===
Stanić started off his professional football career at Sarajevo, before joining the youth team of Slavija Sarajevo in 2005. He made his debut for the first team in 2006. In 2007, he left Slavija.

=== Željezničar ===
Shortly after leaving Slavija, in the summer of 2007, Stanić joined Željezničar. While at Željezničar, he won 3 Bosnian Championships and 2 Bosnian Cups, and was also one of the best players of the club at the time. He was also the club captain in 2014.

He left Željezničar in June 2015, 8 years after joining the club.

=== Olimpik ===
In mid-2015, Stanić signed with Olimpik as a free agent. In January 2016, he left Olimpik.

=== Return to Željezničar ===
On 27 January 2016, Stanić came back to Željezničar and signed a two-year contract. In July 2016, after Miloš Kostić became the new manager of Željezničar, Stanić was left out of the first team and leaving the club felt like an option, but after Slavko Petrović was named the new manager of the club, the first thing he did was getting Stanić back in to the first team and thus, Stanić stayed at Željezničar.

After almost 2 years in his second stint with Željezničar, he left the club on 29 December 2017.

=== Zrinjski Mostar ===
On 5 January 2018, Stanić joined Zrinjski Mostar on a 2 1/2-year contract, which was due to keep him at the club until the summer of 2020. On 21 December 2018, Stanić left the club after not having enough playing time.

With Zrinjski, he won the Bosnian Premier League title in the 2017–18 season.

=== Second return to Željezničar ===
On 31 January 2019, Stanić, for a second time came back and signed a contract with Željezničar, which was due to keep him at the club until the summer of 2020. He made his third debut for Željezničar in a 1–0 home win against Zvijezda 09 on 17 March 2019, playing the whole 90 minutes of the match. He left the club after his contract expired in August 2020.

=== Igman Konjic ===
On 26 September 2020, Stanić signed a contract with First League of FBiH club Igman Konjic. He made his debut only four days later, on 30 September, in a cup match against Velež Nevesinje.

=== Omladinac Doglodi ===
On 23 January 2026, Stanić signed for NK Omladinac Doglodi, in the League of Sarajevo Canton. He made his debut in a friendly against Rudar Breza on 22 February, scoring two goals.

== International career ==
Stanić was part of the Bosnia and Herzegovina U19 national team. On 16 December 2011, he made an appearance for the Bosnia and Herzegovina first team in a 1–0 friendly game loss against Poland.

On 13 May 2014, Stanić was included in the Bosnia national team provisional 2014 FIFA World Cup squad by head coach Safet Sušić, but did not make the final team.

== Style of play ==
Stanić is a long-time player who can play anywhere in midfield, notably on the wings. He has featured as a wing-back on several occasions.

== Career statistics ==
=== Club ===
As of match played 14 November 2020.

Appearances and goals by club, season and competition
Club	Season	League			Cup		Continental		Total	
Club	Season	Division	Apps	Goals	Apps	Goals	Apps	Goals	Apps	Goals
Slavija	2006–07	Bosnian Premier League	13	0	—		—		13	0
Željezničar	2007–08	Bosnian Premier League	27	0	4	1	—		16	1
Željezničar	2008–09	Bosnian Premier League	23	1	1	0	—		24	1
Željezničar	2009–10	Bosnian Premier League	19	1	0	0	—		20	1
Željezničar	2010–11	Bosnian Premier League	28	2	4	1	2	0	34	3
Željezničar	2011–12	Bosnian Premier League	18	0	3	0	2	0	23	0
Željezničar	2012–13	Bosnian Premier League	23	0	5	1	2	0	30	1
Željezničar	2013–14	Bosnian Premier League	29	2	2	0	0	0	31	2
Željezničar	2014–15	Bosnian Premier League	8	1	0	0	4	0	12	1
Željezničar	Total		175	7	19	3	10	0	204	10
Olimpik	2015–16	Bosnian Premier League	12	1	0	0	0	0	12	1
Željezničar	2015–16	Bosnian Premier League	10	0	—		—		10	0
Željezničar	2016–17	Bosnian Premier League	16	1	2	0	—		18	1
Željezničar	2017–18	Bosnian Premier League	13	0	1	0	4	0	18	0
Željezničar	Total		39	1	3	0	4	0	46	1
Zrinjski Mostar	2017–18	Bosnian Premier League	4	0	—		—		4	0
Zrinjski Mostar	2018–19	Bosnian Premier League	1	0	0	0	0	0	1	0
Zrinjski Mostar	Total		5	0	0	0	0	0	5	0
Željezničar	2018–19	Bosnian Premier League	10	0	—		—		10	0
Željezničar	2019–20	Bosnian Premier League	12	0	2	0	—		14	0
Željezničar	Total		22	0	2	0	—		24	0
Igman Konjic	2020–21	First League of FBiH	7	0	1	0	—		8	0
Career total			273	9	25	3	14	0	312	12

=== International ===
As of match played 16 December 2011.

National team	Year	Apps	Goals
Bosnia and Herzegovina
Bosnia and Herzegovina	2011	1	0
Total		1	0

== Honours ==
Željezničar

- Bosnian Premier League: 2009–10, 2011–12, 2012–13
- Bosnian Cup: 2010–11, 2011–12

Zrinjski Mostar

- Bosnian Premier League: 2017–18
