= Ivan Kostić (footballer, born 1989) =

Serbian footballer

Personal information
- Full name: Ivan Kostić
- Date of birth: 24 June 1989 (age 37)
- Place of birth: Niš, SFR Yugoslavia
- Height: 1.90 m (6 ft 3 in)
- Position: Defender

Senior career*
Years	Team	Apps	(Gls)
2006–2008	Banat Zrenjanin	2	(0)
2008–2009	Rad	0	(0)
2009–2010	Mladost Lučani	13	(0)
2010	→ Banat Zrenjanin (loan)	7	(0)
2010–2011	Banat Zrenjanin	29	(0)
2011–2013	Napredak Kruševac	24	(1)
2013	→ Timok (loan)	14	(1)
2014	Dolina Padina	14	(3)
2014–2015	Borac Banja Luka	22	(1)
2015–2017	Sloboda Tuzla	32	(4)
2017	Željezničar	0	(0)
2017–2021	Tuzla City	54	(9)
2021–2022	NK Buducnost Popovac		
2024–	Hamilton City		
- * Club domestic league appearances and goals as of 13 December 2020

Ivan Kostić (Serbian Cyrillic: Иван Костић; born 24 June 1989) is a Serbian professional footballer who plays as a defender.

== Club career ==
=== Serbia ===
Kostić began his early career with stints with Banat Zrenjanin, Rad, and Mladost Lučani. His first piece of silverware was in the Serbian First League with Napredak Kruševac winning the league title in the 2012-13 season. He also had a loan spell with Timok. After Napredak was promoted to the Serbian SuperLiga, he made 8 appearances. He would finish the 2013-14 season in the Serbian second division with Dolina Padina.

=== Bosnia ===
In 2014, Kostić began playing in the Premier League of Bosnia and Herzegovina with Borac Banja Luka. His contract expired at the end of the season and he was linked to move to league rivals Sloboda Tuzla and Zrinjski Mostar. Ultimately, he signed with Sloboda Tuzla for the next season. Initially, when he signed with Sloboda his debut was delayed due to trouble obtaining a work permit. Shortly after he received the necessary paperwork and was permitted to play. In his debut run with Sloboda, he helped the club secure a berth in the 2016–17 UEFA Europa League by finishing second in the standings.

In his second season with Sloboda, he played in both matches against Beitar Jerusalem in the Europa League tournament. Kostić was linked to a move to league rivals Željezničar Sarajevo during the 2017 winter transfer market. After allegations of missed wages, he left Sloboda in February 2017.

Following his departure from Sloboda, he began training with Željezničar to secure a deal. However, any possible move to Željezničar was challenged by Sloboda because of contractual rights to Kostić. After failing to secure a contract with the Sarajevo-based club, he played the remainder of the season in the Slovenian PrvaLiga with Krško Posavje.

=== Tuzla City ===
In the summer of 2017, he returned to Bosnia to sign a deal with Tuzla City in the country's second division. He was also given the captaincy in his debut season. He helped the club secure a promotion to the top-tier league by winning the league title. Kostić re-signed with Tuzla for the following season to play in the premier league. However, he would miss the second portion of the season after receiving a spine surgery.

In late 2019, he renewed his contract with Tuzla City. After receiving an injury from the previous season, he returned to playing with the first team on January 30, 2020. He would also extend his contract with the club for another two and a half years. The following season marked his final campaign with Tuzla as his contract was terminated on April 11, 2021.

After six years abroad in the Bosnian circuits, Kostić returned to Serbia to play in the third-tier league with NK Buducnost Popovac.

=== Canada ===
In the summer of 2024, he played abroad in the Canadian Soccer League with Hamilton City.

== Personal life ==
While playing in Bosnia, he acquired a Bosnia and Herzegovina citizenship in 2018.

== Honours ==
Napredak Kruševac

- Serbian First League: 2012–13

Tuzla City

- First League of FBiH: 2017–18
