= Stefan Smiljanić =

Slovenian footballer

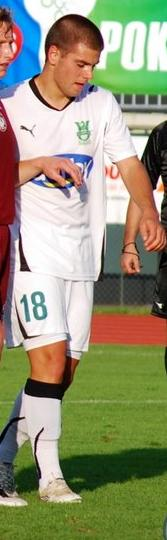

Personal information
- Date of birth: 10 July 1991 (age 35)
- Place of birth: Subotica, FR Yugoslavia
- Height: 1.80 m (5 ft 11 in)
- Position: Winger

Youth career
- 2004–2005: Olimpija
- 2005–2007: Svoboda
- 2008–2010: Olimpija Ljubljana
- 2012: Leicester U23

Senior career*
Years	Team	Apps	(Gls)
2010–2011	Olimpija Ljubljana	26	(2)
2010	→ Kamnik (loan)		
2012	UD Almansa	17	(0)
2012–2013	Hannover 96 II	15	(0)
2013–2014	Doxa Drama	6	(0)
2015	Jedinstvo Putevi	2	(0)
2016	Dob	4	(0)
2016	Metalleghe Jajce	7	(1)
2017–2018	Ankaran Hrvatini	6	(0)
2019	FC Phönix Seen		
2019-2020	FC Kreuzlingen	3	(0)
2020-2021	FK Srbija Uzwil		
- * Club domestic league appearances and goals as of 20:50, 16 February 2020 (UTC)

Stefan Smiljanić (born 10 July 1991) is a Slovenian professional footballer who plays as a winger.

== Club career ==
Smiljanić made his Olimpija Ljubljana debut on 12 September 2010 against Domžale. On 22 January 2011, he signed a four-year deal with Olimpija Ljubljana and was given the number 20 shirt. He has left Olimpija Ljubljana in January 2012 and joined on a six-month contract to Spanish lower league club UD Almansa. After his releasing in summer 2012 was four months without an club, before signed on 18 October 2012 for German side Hannover 96.

He then played with Greek side Doxa Drama, Serbian second-level side Jedinstvo Putevi, then with Dob in the Slovenian Second League, and in Autumn 2016 with Metalleghe-BSI.

In 2019, he joined FC Phönix Seen in Switzerland. In September 2019, he joined FC Kreuzlingen.

== Personal life ==
Born in Subotica, SR Serbia, back then part of FR Yugoslavia, he moved to Slovenia as a 13-year boy from Belgrade, because his father, Blažko, got a job in University Medical Centre Ljubljana.
