= Matteo Boccaccini =

Italian footballer

Personal information
- Date of birth: 8 February 1993 (age 33)
- Place of birth: Bologna, Italy
- Height: 1.90 m (6 ft 3 in)
- Position: Defender

Team information
- Current team: Castelfidardo

Youth career
- 2010–2012: Bologna

Senior career*
Years	Team	Apps	(Gls)
2012–2014	Bologna	0	(0)
2012–2013	→ Fano (loan)	12	(0)
2013–2014	→ Bellaria (loan)	6	(0)
2014–2017	Brescia	0	(0)
2015–2016	→ Gorica (loan)	9	(0)
2016	→ Krka (loan)	8	(2)
2016–2017	→ Željezničar Sarajevo (loan)	19	(1)
2017–2018	Sasso Marconi	28	(4)
2018–2019	Ravenna	29	(1)
2019	Rimini	2	(0)
2019–2020	Carpi	16	(1)
2020–2021	Prato	13	(0)
2021	Ravenna	17	(0)
2021–2023	Athletic Carpi	60	(9)
2023–2024	Flaminia	19	(0)
2024–	Castelfidardo	12	(0)
- * Club domestic league appearances and goals as of 17 November 2024

Matteo Boccaccini (born 8 February 1993) is an Italian footballer who plays as a defender for Castelfidardo in Serie D.

== Club career ==
On 20 July 2012 Boccaccini left the reserve team of Bologna for Lega Pro Seconda Divisione club Fano. in the following season he was signed by Bellaria.

On 27 June 2014, few days before the closure of 2013–14 financial year of most clubs, in order to raise paper profit, Boccaccini was swapped with Gianmarco Gerevini of Brescia, both valued at €800,000. Boccaccini signed a 3-year contract. Boccaccini failed to play any Serie B games for the Lombard club, which on 1 February 2015 he was sent to Slovenia along with Daniele Ferri, who joined Brescia in 2012 for a flopped €2.4 million price tag at that time.

On 1 February 2016 Boccaccini left for Krka in a temporary deal. After Krka, Boccaccini also played for FK Željezničar Sarajevo from 2016 to 2017 and AS Sasso Marconi from 2017 to 2018.

Since the summer of 2018, Boccaccini has been playing for Italian Serie C club Ravenna.

On 26 July 2019, he signed with Rimini. After just two games for Rimini, on 2 September 2019 he moved to Carpi, signing a 2-year contract.

On 22 September 2020 he moved to Serie D club Prato. On 1 February 2021 he returned to Ravenna.
