= Ivan Lendrić =

Croatian footballer (born 1991)

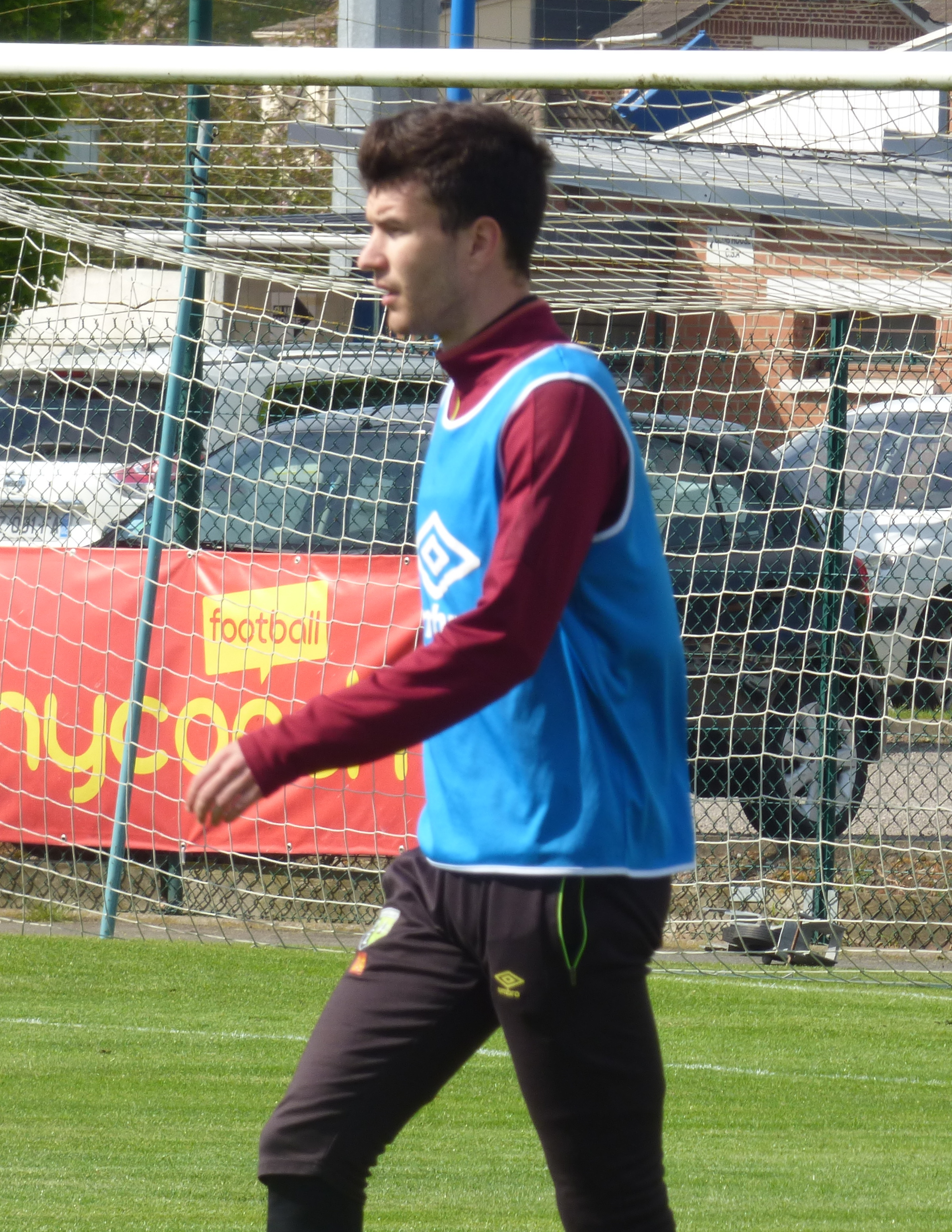
- Lendrić with Lens in 2018

Personal information
- Date of birth: 8 August 1991 (age 35)
- Place of birth: Split, Croatia
- Height: 1.84 m (6 ft 1/2 in)
- Position: Centre-forward

Team information
- Current team: Hrvatski Dragovoljac
- Number: 17

Youth career
- –2005: Solin
- 2005–2010: Hajduk Split

Senior career*
Years	Team	Apps	(Gls)
2010–2012	Hajduk Split	19	(4)
2010–2011	→ Zrinjski Mostar (loan)	28	(16)
2012–2013	Zulte Waregem	20	(2)
2013–2014	Lokomotiva	6	(2)
2014	Kapfenberger SV	15	(5)
2014	Südtirol	14	(4)
2015	Celje	16	(2)
2015	Milsami Orhei	0	(0)
2015	Kerkyra	2	(0)
2016–2017	Željezničar	44	(26)
2017–2018	Lens	9	(2)
2017	→ Lens II	1	(2)
2018	Olimpija Ljubljana	5	(0)
2019	Hermannstadt	10	(2)
2019	Zrinjski Mostar	16	(3)
2020–2021	Željezničar	27	(7)
2021	Nea Salamis	0	(0)
2022	Tsarsko Selo	2	(0)
2022–2023	Rupel Boom	4	(0)
2023–	Hrvatski Dragovoljac	10	(0)

International career
2007	Croatia U16	9	(3)
2007–2008	Croatia U17	10	(2)
2009–2010	Croatia U19	6	(0)
2011	Croatia U20	3	(1)
2010–2011	Croatia U21	7	(2)
- * Club domestic league appearances and goals as of 19 June 2023

Ivan Lendrić (born 8 August 1991) is a Croatian professional footballer who plays as a centre-forward for Croatian side Hrvatski Dragovoljac.

== Club career ==
Born in Split, Lendrić rose through the ranks of the Hajduk Split Academy. In the 2009–10 season, his last youth level season, Lendrić was top scorer of the Croatian academy league and was voted best youth player by the Croatian sports daily Sportske novosti.

He turned professional in July 2010, but failed to break into the first team under coach Stanko Poklepović so he was loaned to Bosnian Premier League club Zrinjski Mostar. While at Zrinjski, Lendrić became top scorer in the 2010–11 Bosnian championship with 16 goals.

In summer 2011, he returned from the loan and joined the first team under coach Krasimir Balakov. In his first professional season with Hajduk, he scored four goals in nineteen appearances, playing mostly as a substitute.

In June 2012, Lendrić signed a three-year contract with Belgian club Zulte Waregem.

After a moderately successful season at Zulte Waregem, Lokomotiva decided to bring the player back to the 1. HNL in a €500,000 deal. In January 2014, his contract with Lokomotiva was terminated after just six first team appearances and no goals.

In February 2014, Lenrić signed with the Austrian Football Second League side Kapfenberger SV, where he scored five goals in fifteen appearances. On 30 August 2014, Lendrić signed with Italian side FC Südtirol.

In 2015, Lendrić played for Celje, Milsami Orhei, and PAE Kerkyra.

On 5 January 2016, Lendrić joined Bosnian Premier League side Željezničar. Željezničar finished the 2016–17 season as runners-up, with Lendrić becoming the league's top goalscorer with 19 goals.

Lendrić then moved to French Ligue 2 club Lens for a €300,000 fee in July 2017, and signed a three-year contract. After one season with Lens, his contract was terminated in June 2018.

Lendrić went on trial with Scottish Premiership club Hibernian in July 2018, but was not offered a contract.

On 8 August 2018, Lendrić signed with Slovenian club Olimpija Ljubljana. He scored his first and only goal for the club on his debut in a cup game on 29 September against Triglav Kranj. On 4 December 2018, after only four months at Olimpija, Lendrić left the club.

On 24 December 2018, Lendrić became the new player of Romanian First League club Hermannstadt. He scored his first goal for Hermannstadt on 19 April 2019, in a 1–1 home draw against Voluntari.

On 21 June 2019, Lendrić returned to Bosnia and Herzegovina and signed a two-year contract with Zrinjski Mostar, the club he played for in the 2010–11 season. He made his official debut and scored his first goal for Zrinjski since 2011 on 11 July 2019, in a 3–0 away win against Akademija Pandev in the 2019–20 UEFA Europa League first qualifying round. Lendrić made his first league appearance for Zrinjski after nine years on 21 July 2019, in a 1–0 away loss against Sarajevo. He scored his first league goal since his return to Zrinjski on 24 August 2019, in a 4–0 home win against Borac Banja Luka. On 10 December 2019, Lendrić decided to terminate his contract with Zrinjski and left the club.

Two and a half years after leaving Željezničar, on 7 January 2020, he returned to the Sarajevo-based club, signing a one-and-a-half-year contract. He played his first official match after his return to Željezničar on 22 February 2020, a 0–0 league draw against Radnik Bijeljina on 22 February 2020. The first goal he scored since his return to the club was in a 3–0 win against Zvijezda 09 on 29 February 2020. Lendrić left Željezničar in May 2021.

== International career ==
Internationally, Lendrić represented Croatia at all youth levels and was part of the squad that was called up for the 2011 FIFA U-20 World Cup by manager Ivica Grnja, where he scored a goal in Croatia's 5–2 defeat against Nigeria.

== Career statistics ==
=== Club ===
As of match played 1 May 2021.

Appearances and goals by club, season and competition
Club	Season	League			Cup		League Cup		Continental		Other		Total	
Club	Season	Division	Apps	Goals	Apps	Goals	Apps	Goals	Apps	Goals	Apps	Goals	Apps	Goals
Hajduk Split	2010–11	1. HNL	0	0	0	0	—		0	0	—		0	0
Zrinjski Mostar (loan)	2010–11	Bosnian Premier League	28	16	1	1	—		0	0	—		29	17
Hajduk Split	2011–12	1. HNL	19	4	1	0	—		0	0	—		20	4
Zulte Waregem	2012–13	Belgian Pro League	20	2	3	1	—		—		—		23	3
Zulte Waregem	2013–14	Belgian Pro League	0	0	0	0	—		0	0	—		0	0
Zulte Waregem	Total		20	2	3	1	—		0	0	—		23	3
Lokomotiva	2013–14	1. HNL	6	2	0	0	—		0	0	—		6	2
Kapfenberger SV	2013–14	Austrian First League	15	5	0	0	—		—		—		15	5
Südtirol	2014–15	Lega Pro	14	4	0	0	—		—		—		14	4
Celje	2014–15	Slovenian PrvaLiga	16	2	3	1	—		—		—		19	3
Milsami Orhei	2015–16	Divizia Națională	0	0	0	0	—		0	0	—		0	0
Kerkyra	2015–16	Football League	2	0	1	0	—		—		—		3	0
Željezničar	2015–16	Bosnian Premier League	12	7	3	2	—		—		—		15	9
Željezničar	2016–17	Bosnian Premier League	32	19	3	1	—		—		—		35	20
Željezničar	2017–18	Bosnian Premier League	0	0	0	0	—		2	2	—		2	2
Željezničar	Total		44	26	6	3	—		2	2	—		52	31
Lens	2017–18	Ligue 2	9	2	1	3	1	1	—		—		11	6
Lens II	2017–18	Championnat National 2	1	2	—		—		—		—		1	2
Olimpija Ljubljana	2018–19	Slovenian PrvaLiga	5	0	2	2	—		0	0	—		7	2
Hermannstadt	2018–19	Liga I	10	2	1	0	—		—		2 (Note: Appearances in 2018–19 Liga I play-off)	0	13	2
Zrinjski Mostar	2019–20	Bosnian Premier League	16	3	2	3	—		6	0	—		24	6
Željezničar	2019–20	Bosnian Premier League	3	1	0	0	—		—		—		3	1
Željezničar	2020–21	Bosnian Premier League	24	6	2	0	—		1	1	—		27	7
Željezničar	Total		27	7	2	0	—		1	1	—		30	8
Career total			232	77	23	14	1	1	9	3	2	0	267	95

== Honours ==
Individual

- Bosnian Premier League top scorer: 2010–11, 2016–17
