= Stevo Nikolić =

Bosnian association football player

Personal information
- Full name: Stevo Nikolić
- Date of birth: 4 December 1984 (age 41)
- Place of birth: Bosanski Šamac, SFR Yugoslavia
- Height: 1.84 m (6 ft 1/2 in)
- Position: Forward

Team information
- Current team: Žarkovo
- Number: 24

Youth career
- 1998–1999: Borac Šamac
- 1999–2002: Obilić

Senior career*
Years	Team	Apps	(Gls)
2002–2005	Obilić	8	(0)
2005–2008	Modriča	99	(45)
2008–2010	Oțelul Galați	7	(1)
2010–2011	Borac Banja Luka	26	(10)
2011–2013	Debrecen	21	(5)
2012	→ Spartak Trnava (loan)	6	(1)
2013–2016	Zrinjski Mostar	63	(27)
2016–2017	Željezničar Sarajevo	34	(6)
2018–2019	Čelik Zenica	31	(7)
2019–2020	Žarkovo	23	(9)
2020	Brodarac		
2021–	Jedinstvo Surčin	0	(0)

International career
2008–2012	Bosnia and Herzegovina	6	(1)
- * Club domestic league appearances and goals as of 18:31, 20 November 2019 (UTC)

Stevo Nikolić (Serbian Cyrillic: Cтeвo Николић; born 4 December 1984) is a Bosnian professional footballer who plays for Žarkovo.

== Club career ==
Born in Bosanski Šamac, SR Bosnia and Herzegovina, he started playing with local side Borac Šamac, and in 1999, with 15 years, he moved to Belgrade to play in the youth team of FK Obilić, the surprising 1998 FR Yugoslavia champions. With them, he was the national youth champion in Serbia, and from 2002 to 2004 played with the first team.

In 2004, he returned to Bosnia and signed with Cup holders FK Modriča, and played there until 2008 when he moved to Romanian club Oțelul Galați. He became a free agent in the summer of 2010, after a two-year spell at Otelul, he signed with Borac Banja Luka. After one season in Bosnia in which Borac won the championship, he moved to Hungary by signing with Debreceni VSC.

== International career ==
Just like namesake Staniša, Stevo Nikolić made his debut for Bosnia and Herzegovina in a January 2008 friendly match away against Japan and has earned a total of 2 caps, scoring 1 goal. His second and final international was a June 2008 friendly against Azerbaijan.

=== International goals ===
Scores and results table. Bosnia and Herzegovina's goal tally first:

Goal	Date	Venue	Opponent	Score	Result	Competition
1.	1 June 2008	Bilino Polje Stadium, Zenica, Bosnia and Herzegovina	Azerbaijan	1–0	1–0	Friendly

== Honours ==
=== Player ===
Modriča

- Bosnian Premier League: 2007–08

Borac Banja Luka

- Bosnian Premier League: 2010–11

Debreceni

- Hungarian First League: 2011–12
- Hungarian Cup: 2011–12

Zrinjski Mostar

- Bosnian Premier League: 2013–14, 2015–16

Individual

- Bosnian Premier League top scorer: 2006–07
