= Miloš Kostić =

Slovenian footballer and manager

Personal information
- Full name: Miloš Kostić
- Date of birth: 23 November 1971 (age 54)
- Place of birth: Ljubljana, SFR Yugoslavia
- Position: Defender

Team information
- Current team: Tajikistan U20 (Manager)

Senior career*
Years	Team	Apps	(Gls)
1991–1994	Svoboda	65	(0)
1994–1995	Vevče	17	(0)
1995–1997	Gorica	13	(0)
1997–1999	Olimpija Ljubljana	29	(0)
2000-2001	Livar Ivančna Gorica	12	(0)
2001-2003	Grosuplje	40	(2)

Managerial career
- 2008–2010: Slovenia U19
- 2011–2012: Slovenia U17
- 2013: Slovenia U19
- 2013–2014: Red Star Belgrade (assistant)
- 2014–2015: Lierse (assistant)
- 2015–2016: Krka
- 2016: Željezničar
- 2016–2017: Acharnaikos
- 2017: Iraklis
- 2018: Olimpija Ljubljana (youth)
- 2018: Luftëtari
- 2019: Trikala
- 2020: Sint-Truiden
- 2024–: Tajikistan U20
- * Club domestic league appearances and goals

Miloš Kostić (born 23 November 1971) is a Slovenian professional football manager, currently in charge of Tajikistan U20, and former player. He was most recently the manager of Belgian First Division A club Sint-Truiden.

== Honours ==
=== Player ===
Gorica

- Slovenian PrvaLiga: 1995–96
- Slovenian Supercup: 1996
