= Ognjen Valjić =

Bosnian professional football referee (born 1981)

- Full name: Ognjen Valjić
- Born: 20 September 1981 (age 45); Banja Luka, Bosnia and Herzegovina
- Other occupation: Economist

Domestic
Years	League	Role

International
Years	League	Role
2011–	FIFA listed	Referee

Ognjen Valjić (born 20 May 1981) is a Bosnian professional football referee. He has been a full international for FIFA since 2011.
