= Mirza Halvadžić =

Swedish footballer (born 1996)

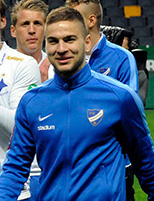
- Halvadžić with IFK Norrköping in May 2015

Personal information
- Full name: Mirza Halvadžić
- Date of birth: 15 February 1996 (age 30)
- Place of birth: Lund, Sweden
- Height: 1.77 m (5 ft 10 in)
- Position: Attacking midfielder

Team information
- Current team: BK Olympic
- Number: 9

Youth career
- Lunds BK
- –2014: Malmö FF

Senior career*
| Years | Team | Apps | (Gls) |
| 2014–2015 | IFK Norrköping | 5 | (0) |
| 2015 | → Trelleborgs FF (loan) | 7 | (0) |
| 2016 | Željezničar | 3 | (0) |
| 2017–2020 | Mjällby | 45 | (7) |
| 2020 | Lunds BK | 1 | (0) |
| 2020–2021 | Sloboda Tuzla | 1 | (0) |
| 2021 | Torn | 22 | (3) |
| 2022 | Lunds BK | 27 | (3) |
| 2023 | Kristianstad | 7 | (1) |
| 2023– | Olympic | 6 | (0) |

International career
| 2011–2013 | Sweden U17 | 37 | (4) |
| 2013–2015 | Sweden U19 | 12 | (3) |
- * Club domestic league appearances and goals as of 30 November 2023

Mirza Halvadžić (born 15 February 1996) is a Swedish professional footballer who plays as an attacking midfielder for BK Olympic.

== International career ==
Halvadžić has represented the bronze-winning Sweden U17 national team in the 2013 FIFA U-17 World Cup. In total, he played 31 matches for the U17 team and scored four goals. He has played eight matches and scored three goals for the Sweden U19 national team.

== Honours ==
IFK Norrköping

- Allsvenskan: 2015

Mjällby AIF

- Superettan: 2019

Sweden U17

- FIFA U-17 World Cup Third place: 2013
