= Jadranko Bogičević =

Bosnian football manager (born 1983)

Personal information
- Date of birth: 11 March 1983 (age 43)
- Place of birth: Vlasenica, SR Bosnia and Herzegovina, SFR Yugoslavia
- Height: 1.88 m (6 ft 2 in)
- Position: Centre-back

Team information
- Current team: Igman Konjic (manager)

Senior career*
| Years | Team | Apps | (Gls) |
| 2001–2003 | Jedinstvo Brčko | 32 | (6) |
| 2003–2005 | Red Star Belgrade | 2 | (0) |
| 2005–2006 | Borac Banja Luka | 20 | (2) |
| 2007–2010 | Modriča | 50 | (6) |
| 2010–2013 | Željezničar | 77 | (7) |
| 2013 | Hapoel Nir Ramat HaSharon | 7 | (0) |
| 2014–2016 | Olimpik | 41 | (1) |
| 2016–2020 | Željezničar | 79 | (4) |
| 2020–2021 | Slavija Sarajevo | 13 | (0) |
| Total | | 321 | (26) |

International career
| 2005 | Bosnia and Herzegovina U21 | 4 | (0) |

Managerial career
- 2024–2025: Romanija Pale
- 2026–: Igman Konjic
- * Club domestic league appearances and goals

Jadranko Bogičević (born 11 March 1983) is a Bosnian professional football manager and former player who is the manager of First League of FBiH club Igman Konjic.

== Club career ==
After starting in Jedinstvo Brčko, Bogičević made a great move to Serbian club Red Star Belgrade, where he stayed for two seasons, but he didn't get many chances, with only 2 appearances in the 2003–04 First League of Serbia and Montenegro season and none in the following season.

Afterwards, he returned to Bosnia, and played first in Borac Banja Luka, before moving to Modriča in 2007. He won his first league title with Modriča in the 2007–08 season. In January 2010, Bogičević signed with Željezničar, then moved to Ironi Nir Ramat HaSharon in 2013, and subsequently signed with Olimpik.

In 2016, Bogičević came back to Željezničar, the club that he had the most success with. On 29 October 2018, it was announced that he, alongside former teammate Jovan Blagojević was not counted on the remaining games until the winter break of the season. Reasons for that decision of the club's board of directors and Željezničar's manager at that time, Milomir Odović are to this day completely unknown.

On 31 January 2019, Bogičević extended his contract with Željezničar, which was due to keep him at the club until January 2020. He left the club on 20 January 2020 after his contract expired.

Shortly after leaving Željezničar, Bogičević joined Slavija Sarajevo in January 2020. Bogičević finished his career in January 2021.

== International career ==
Bogičević was part of the Bosnia and Herzegovina U21 national team in 2005.

== Honours ==
Red Star Belgrade

- Serbia and Montenegro League: 2003–04
- Serbia and Montenegro Cup: 2003–04

Borac Banja Luka

- First League of RS: 2005–06

Modriča

- Bosnian Premier League: 2007–08

Željezničar

- Bosnian Premier League: 2011–12, 2012–13
- Bosnian Cup: 2010–11, 2011–12, 2017–18

Olimpik

- Bosnian Cup: 2014–15
