= Nemanja Stjepanović =

Bosnian footballer

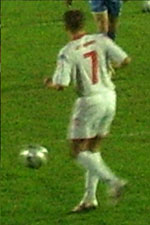
- Stjepanović playing for Zrinjski Mostar in October 2010

Personal information
- Full name: Nemanja Stjepanović
- Date of birth: 7 February 1984 (age 42)
- Place of birth: Ljubovija, SFR Yugoslavia
- Height: 1.80 m (5 ft 11 in)
- Position: Midfielder

Senior career*
Years	Team	Apps	(Gls)
2004–2005	Bačinci		
2005–2008	Modriča		
2008–2009	Laktaši	8	(0)
2009–2010	Modriča	9	(0)
2010	Laktaši	14	(0)
2010–2011	Zrinjski Mostar	25	(2)
2011–2012	Kozara	18	(0)
2012–2015	Rudar Velenje	61	(0)
2015–2017	Sloboda Tuzla	31	(1)
2017–2020	Tuzla City	34	(0)

International career
2014–2015	Bosnia and Herzegovina U21		
- * Club domestic league appearances and goals as of 28 February 2020

Nemanja Stjepanović (born 7 February 1984) is a Bosnian retired footballer who played as a midfielder. He last played for Bosnian Premier League club Tuzla City.

He holds both the Bosnian and Serbian citizenships.

== Club career ==
After a spell abroad with Slovenian side Rudar Velenje he returned to Bosnia in 2015 to play for Sloboda Tuzla. He crossed town when he joined newly promoted Sloga Simin Han in summer 2017.

== Honours ==
Modriča

- Bosnian Premier League: 2007–08

Tuzla City

- First League of FBiH: 2017–18
