= Uglješa Radinović =

Serbian footballer

Personal information
- Date of birth: 25 August 1993 (age 33)
- Place of birth: Novi Sad, FR Yugoslavia
- Height: 1.84 m (6 ft 1/2 in)
- Position: Midfielder

Team information
- Current team: Spartax João Pessoa

Youth career
- –2010: Zbrojovka Brno

Senior career*
Years	Team	Apps	(Gls)
2010–2012	Zbrojovka Brno	2	(0)
2012–2013	Bežanija	38	(6)
2013	Rad	12	(3)
2014	Rudar Prijedor	11	(0)
2014–2016	Borac Banja Luka	45	(5)
2016–2017	Željezničar Sarajevo	24	(0)
2017–2019	Bačka Palanka	53	(3)
2019–2021	Proleter Novi Sad	19	(2)
2022–2024	Borac Šajkaš		
2024	CE Força e Luz	4	(0)
2024	Atlético San Cristóbal	2	(0)
2024-	Spartax João Pessoa		

International career
2009–2010	Serbia U17	10	(0)
- * Club domestic league appearances and goals as of 20 June 2021

Uglješa Radinović (Serbian Cyrillic: Угљеша Радиновић; born 25 August 1993) is a Serbian professional footballer who plays as a midfielder.

Radinović joined Brazilian lower league side Força e Luz in March 2024 and moved to Spartax João Pessoa at the end of August that year. In between, he played two games in the Liga Dominicana de Fútbol for San Cristóbal in 2024.
