= Zoran Milutinović =

Bosnian footballer (born 1988)

Personal information
- Full name: Zoran Milutinović
- Date of birth: 1 March 1988 (age 38)
- Place of birth: Prijedor, SFR Yugoslavia
- Height: 1.81 m (5 ft 11 1/2 in)
- Position: Midfielder

Team information
- Current team: SG Waidhofen/Ybbs

Youth career
- 1997–2007: Rudar Prijedor

Senior career*
Years	Team	Apps	(Gls)
2007–2008	Příbram	16	(2)
2008–2009	Laktaši	12	(2)
2009–2013	Slavia Prague	34	(1)
2010	→ Hlučín (loan)	13	(1)
2013	Rudar Prijedor	11	(1)
2013–2014	Inter Zaprešić	28	(5)
2014–2015	Tyrnavos 2005	31	(0)
2015–2016	Rudar Prijedor	30	(4)
2016–2017	Krupa	48	(5)
2018	Voždovac	23	(0)
2019–2020	Borac Banja Luka	28	(3)
2020	SK Sokol Brozany		
2021–2022	SCU Ybbsitz		
2022–	SG Waidhofen/Ybbs		

International career
2009	Bosnia and Herzegovina U21	2	(0)
- * Club domestic league appearances and goals as of 8 March 2020

Zoran Milutinović (Serbian Cyrillic: Зоран Милутиновић; born 1 March 1988) is a Bosnian footballer, who plays as a midfielder for SG Waidhofen/Ybbs.

He previously played with NK Inter Zaprešić.

== Honours ==
Borac Banja Luka

- First League of RS: 2018–19
