= 2017–18 FK Željezničar season =

Željezničar
2017–18 season
- Chairman: Vedran Vukotić (until 11 December); Senad Misimović (from 16 December)
- Manager: Slavko Petrović (until 23 July); Admir Adžem (from 23 July)
- Stadium: Grbavica Stadium
- Premijer Liga BiH: 2nd
- Kup BiH: Winners
- UEFA Europa League: 2Q
- UEFA Youth League: Play-offs
- Top goalscorer: League: Goran Zakarić (12); All: Goran Zakarić (18)
- Highest home attendance: 11,170 vs AIK (13 July 2017)
- Lowest home attendance: 1,500 vs Mladost Doboj Kakanj (26 October 2017)
Home colours	Away colours	Third colours

The 2017–2018 season will be Željezničar's 97th in existence and their 18th season in Premijer Liga BiH. The team will be competing in three major tournaments, Premijer Liga BiH, Kup BiH and UEFA Europa League. The youth team will also be competing in UEFA Youth League for the second time in three years.

== Season review ==
=== May ===
On 29 May, Željezničar and Danijel Stojanović agreed to terminate contract.

=== June ===
On 5 June, the club announced new kits for the upcoming season.

On 7 June, Željezničar announced the signing of 22-year-old Dženan Zajmović from Travnik.

On 9 June, Željezničar and Dino Hasanović negotiated a two-year contract extension lasting until May 2019.

On 13 June, Željezničar announced the signing of 23-year-old Asim Zec from Sloboda Tuzla.

On 13 June, Željezničar announced the loan of 23-year-old Daniel Graovac from Belgium club Mouscron.

On 14 June, the club announced promotion of nine home grown players to the first team.

On 18 June, Željezničar announced the signing of 24-year-old Sinan Ramović from Mladost Doboj Kakanj.

=== July ===
On 8 July, Željezničar and Lens reached an agreement for the transfer of Ivan Lendrić. On 10 July, the transfer was completed.

On 9 July, Željezničar announced the signing of 29-year-old Josip Projić from Serbian club Napredak Kruševac.

On 23 July, the club appointed 44-year-old Admir Adžem as the new head coach, after releasing Slavko Petrović from his duties.

On 24 July, the club appointed 46-year-old Asmir Džafić as the new assistant head coach.

On 24 July, the club announced that Sanel Jahić's contract would be rescinded.

=== August ===
On 1 August, Željezničar and Admiral Casino extended sponsorship agreement.

On 4 August, Željezničar and Sophico signed a sponsorship agreement.

On 8 August, Željezničar and Kemal Osmanković negotiated a three-year contract extension lasting until 2020.

On 9 August, Željezničar negotiated a three-year contract extension lasting until 2021 with youth players Denis Žerić and Ajdin Mujagić.

On 9 August, Željezničar announced the signing of 33-year-old Saša Kajkut from Zrinjski.

On 14 August, Željezničar and Vedran Kjosevski negotiated a three-year contract extension lasting until 2020.

On 16 August, Željezničar and Uglješa Radinović agreed to terminate contract.

=== September ===
On 15 September, Željezničar and Lutrija BiH extended sponsorship agreement.

On 16 September, Željezničar and Mikrokreditna fondacija Sunrise extended sponsorship agreement.

On 25 September, the club announced Aldin Čenan is leaving the position as Director of Sports due to health problems.

On 29 September, Željezničar announced the signing of 31-year-old Rok Elsner.

=== October ===
On 2 October, Željezničar announced the signing of 29-year-old Vojo Ubiparip.

On 5 October, the club announced promotion of youth players Filip Dujmović and Semir Dacić to the first team.

On 24 October, Željezničar and Haris Hajdarević negotiated a four-year contract extension lasting until 2021.

On 27 October, the club announced youth players Kemal Mujarić, Eldar Šehić and Dženan Osmanović have signed apprenticeship contracts.

=== November ===
On 9 November, Željezničar and Adnan Bobić agreed to terminate contract.

On 15 November, the club appointed 37-year-old Saša Papac as the new Director of Sports.

On 21 November, Željezničar and Euroherc osiguranje extended sponsorship agreement.

On 23 November, Željezničar and Sarajevska pivara extended sponsorship agreement.

On 28 November, Željezničar and Stevo Nikolić agreed to terminate contract.

=== December ===
On 8 December, Željezničar and Oktal Pharma extended sponsorship agreement.

On 11 December, the club announced changes in management. On 16 December, Senad Misimović was appointed as the new Chairman of the club.

On 18 December, Željezničar and Dženis Beganović agreed to terminate contract.

On 19 December, Željezničar and Centrotrans Eurolines extended sponsorship agreement.

On 21 December, Željezničar and ELPI Comerc extended sponsorship agreement.

On 21 December, Željezničar announced the signing of 25-year-old Adi Mehremić from Austrian club St. Pölten.

On 21 December, Željezničar and Irfan Fejzić negotiated a one-and-a-half-year contract extension lasting until 2019.

On 25 December, Željezničar and Darko Marković agreed to terminate contract.

=== January ===
On 5 January, Željezničar and Kristal signed sponsorship agreement.

On 9 January, the club announced an international public call for the submission of bids for the reconstruction of the main pitch of the Grbavica Stadium.

On 10 January, Željezničar and restaurant Slatko i Slano signed sponsorship agreement.

On 11 January, the club announced the signings of Almir Ćubara and Meldin Jusufi.

On 17 January, Željezničar and BiH.ba signed a media partnership agreement.

On 17 January, Željezničar and Mann+Hummel signed a sponsorship agreement.

On 18 January, Željezničar and ASA Osiguranje extended sponsorship agreement.

On 18 January, Željezničar and Dino Hasanović agreed to terminate contract.

On 18 January, the club announced three players will be leaving on loan to Iskra.

On 22 January, Željezničar announced the signing of 23-year-old Kenan Hadžić from Croatian club Istra 1961.

On 23 January, Željezničar announced the signing of 31-year-old Stojan Vranješ from Polish club Piast Gliwice.

On 26 January, Željezničar and Samir Bekrić agreed to terminate contract.

On 26 January, Željezničar announced the signing of 21-year-old Andrej Modić from Italian club Milan.

=== February ===
On 2 February, Željezničar and Mark Medical signed sponsorship agreement.

On 12 February, Željezničar and Milkos signed sponsorship agreement.

On 21 February, Željezničar and Hotel Novotel Sarajevo Bristol signed sponsorship agreement.

On 22 February, Željezničar and In Time signed sponsorship agreement.

On 27 February, Željezničar and Dnevni avaz extended media agreement.

=== March ===
On 3 March, the club announced Ajdin Mujagić will be leaving on loan to Travnik.

On 9 March, the club announced Sarajevo osiguranje as the new golden sponsor.

On 12 March, Željezničar and Atos osiguranje signed sponsorship agreement.

On 23 March, Željezničar and Adriatic osiguranje signed sponsorship agreement.

On 29 March, Željezničar and Rail Cargo Logistics – BH signed sponsorship agreement.

=== April ===
On 4 April, the club announced Ziraat Bank as the new general sponsor.

== Squad statistics ==
=== Players ===
N	Pos.	Nat.	Name	Age	EU	Since	App	Goals	Ends	Transfer fee	Notes
1	GK	(Bosnia and Herzegovina)	Irfan Fejzić	39	Non-EU	2016	12	0	2019	Free	
2	DF	(Serbia)	Siniša Stevanović	36	Non-EU	2016	71	0	2019	Free	Second nationality: Croatia
3	DF	(Bosnia and Herzegovina)	Amar Beširević	26	Non-EU	2016	2	0	2018	Youth system	
4	FW	(Bosnia and Herzegovina)	Saša Kajkut	41	Non-EU	2017	28	4	2018	Free	Second nationality: Serbia
5	DF	(Bosnia and Herzegovina)	Daniel Graovac	32	EU	2017	40	2	2018	Free	On loan from Mouscron
6	MF	(Bosnia and Herzegovina)	Asim Zec	31	Non-EU	2017	32	6	2020	Free	
7	MF	(Croatia)	Ivan Crnov	35	EU	2017	12	1	2018	Free	Second nationality: BiH
8	DF	(Bosnia and Herzegovina)	Adi Mehremić	33	Non-EU	2018	16	0	2019	Free	
9	MF	(Bosnia and Herzegovina)	Sinan Ramović	32	Non-EU	2017	34	4	2020	Free	
11	MF	(Serbia)	Jovan Blagojević	37	Non-EU	2015	110	7	2018	Free	
12	GK	(Bosnia and Herzegovina)	Aldin Ćeman	30	Non-EU	2014	1	0	2019	Youth system	
13	GK	(Bosnia and Herzegovina)	Vedran Kjosevski	30	Non-EU	2013	97	1	2020	Youth system	Second nationality: Macedonia
14	DF	(Bosnia and Herzegovina)	Almir Ćubara	27	Non-EU	2017	1	0	2020	Free	Originally from youth system
15	DF	(Bosnia and Herzegovina)	Jadranko Bogičević	42	Non-EU	2016	174	11	2019	Free	
17	MF	(Bosnia and Herzegovina)	Goran Zakarić	32	Non-EU	2017	59	20	2019	Free	
18	FW	(Bosnia and Herzegovina)	Dženan Zajmović	30	EU	2017	22	4	2020	Free	Originally from youth system
19	MF	(Bosnia and Herzegovina)	Anel Šabanadžović	26	Non-EU	2017	24	2	2020	Youth system	Second nationality: United States
20	MF	(Bosnia and Herzegovina)	Zajko Zeba	42	Non-EU	2017	151	39	2018	Free	Originally from youth system
21	MF	(Bosnia and Herzegovina)	Meldin Jusufi	26	Non-EU	2017	0	0	2020	Free	Originally from youth system
22	DF	(Croatia)	Kenan Hadžić	31	EU	2018	8	0	2019	Free	
23	MF	(Bosnia and Herzegovina)	Stojan Vranješ	38	Non-EU	2018	15	2	2019	Free	Second nationality: Serbia
24	FW	(Bosnia and Herzegovina)	Ajdin Mujagić	27	Non-EU	2015	16	3	2020	Youth system	On loan to Travnik
25	MF	(Bosnia and Herzegovina)	Haris Hajdarević	26	Non-EU	2017	29	0	2021	Youth system	
26	DF	(Bosnia and Herzegovina)	Aldin Šehić	26	Non-EU	2017	0	0	2018	Youth system	
27	DF	(Bosnia and Herzegovina)	Kemal Osmanković	28	Non-EU	2014	31	1	2020	Youth system	
28	DF	(Bosnia and Herzegovina)	Tarik Džindo	26	Non-EU	2017	0	0	2018	Youth system	
29	MF	(Bosnia and Herzegovina)	Andrej Modić	29	Non-EU	2018	2	0	2021	Free	
30	FW	(Bosnia and Herzegovina)	Mirza Šubo	27	Non-EU	2017	0	0	2020	Youth system	On loan to Iskra
31	DF	(Bosnia and Herzegovina)	Benjamin Šehić	26	Non-EU	2017	0	0	2018	Youth system	On loan to Iskra
32	DF	(Bosnia and Herzegovina)	Haris Kurtović	26	Non-EU	2017	1	0	2020	Youth system	On loan to Iskra
33	DF	(Serbia)	Josip Projić	38	Non-EU	2017	19	0	2019	Free	
34	DF	(Bosnia and Herzegovina)	Amir Velić	26	Non-EU	2017	1	0	2018	Youth system	
35	GK	(Bosnia and Herzegovina)	Filip Dujmović	26	Non-EU	2017	0	0	2018	Youth system	
36	MF	(Bosnia and Herzegovina)	Semir Dacić	26	Non-EU	2017	0	0	2020	Youth system	
39	MF	(Bosnia and Herzegovina)	Denis Žerić	27	Non-EU	2015	30	2	2020	Youth system	
51	FW	(Serbia)	Vojo Ubiparip	37	Non-EU	2017	24	9	2018	Free	
TBD	GK	(Bosnia and Herzegovina)	Vernes Karavdić	27	Non-EU	2017	0	0	2020	Youth system	On loan to Iskra

- Last updated: 19 May 2018
- Source: fkzeljeznicar.ba

Total squad cost:

=== Disciplinary record ===
Includes all competitive matches. The list is sorted by position, and then shirt number.

N	P	Nat.	Name	League			Cup			Europe			Others			Total			Notes
N	P	Nat.	Name	Yellow card	Second yellow card	Red card	Yellow card	Second yellow card	Red card	Yellow card	Second yellow card	Red card	Yellow card	Second yellow card	Red card	Yellow card	Second yellow card	Red card	Notes
1	GK	(Bosnia and Herzegovina)	Irfan Fejzić	1												1			
2	DF	(Serbia)	Siniša Stevanović	9			2									11			
3	DF	(Bosnia and Herzegovina)	Amar Beširević																
4	FW	(Bosnia and Herzegovina)	Saša Kajkut	1												1			
5	DF	(Bosnia and Herzegovina)	Daniel Graovac	7	2					2						9	2		
6	MF	(Bosnia and Herzegovina)	Asim Zec	2						1						3			
7	MF	(Croatia)	Ivan Crnov																
8	DF	(Bosnia and Herzegovina)	Adi Mehremić	6			2									8			
9	MF	(Bosnia and Herzegovina)	Sinan Ramović	7	1		1									8	1		
11	MF	(Serbia)	Jovan Blagojević	6						1						7			
12	GK	(Bosnia and Herzegovina)	Aldin Ćeman																
13	GK	(Bosnia and Herzegovina)	Vedran Kjosevski	1												1			
14	DF	(Bosnia and Herzegovina)	Almir Ćubara																
15	DF	(Bosnia and Herzegovina)	Jadranko Bogičević	7			2			2						11			
17	MF	(Bosnia and Herzegovina)	Goran Zakarić	4			2			1						7			
18	FW	(Bosnia and Herzegovina)	Dženan Zajmović																
19	MF	(Bosnia and Herzegovina)	Anel Šabanadžović	3			1									4			
20	MF	(Bosnia and Herzegovina)	Zajko Zeba				1			1						2			
21	MF	(Bosnia and Herzegovina)	Meldin Jusufi																
22	DF	(Croatia)	Kenan Hadžić																
23	MF	(Bosnia and Herzegovina)	Stojan Vranješ	1			1									2			
24	FW	(Bosnia and Herzegovina)	Ajdin Mujagić	2												2			
25	MF	(Bosnia and Herzegovina)	Haris Hajdarević	3			2									5			
26	DF	(Bosnia and Herzegovina)	Aldin Šehić																
27	DF	(Bosnia and Herzegovina)	Kemal Osmanković	3												3			
28	DF	(Bosnia and Herzegovina)	Tarik Džindo																
29	MF	(Bosnia and Herzegovina)	Andrej Modić																
30	FW	(Bosnia and Herzegovina)	Mirza Šubo																
31	DF	(Bosnia and Herzegovina)	Benjamin Šehić																
32	DF	(Bosnia and Herzegovina)	Haris Kurtović																
33	DF	(Serbia)	Josip Projić	4			2			2						8			
34	DF	(Bosnia and Herzegovina)	Amir Velić																
35	GK	(Bosnia and Herzegovina)	Filip Dujmović																
36	MF	(Bosnia and Herzegovina)	Semir Dacić																
39	MF	(Bosnia and Herzegovina)	Denis Žerić							1						1			
51	FW	(Serbia)	Vojo Ubiparip	2			1									3			
TBD	GK	(Bosnia and Herzegovina)	Vernes Karavdić																

Last updated: 12 May 2018
Source: Competitive matches and fkzeljeznicar.ba
Ordered by (red card) , (second yellow card) and (yellow card)
(yellow card) = Number of bookings; (second yellow card) = Number of sending offs after a second yellow card; (red card) = Number of sending offs by a direct red card.

=== Goalscorers ===
No.	Pos.	Nation	Name	Premijer Liga BiH	Kup BiH	Europa League	Total
17	MF	(Bosnia and Herzegovina)	Zakarić	12	5	1	18
51	FW	(Serbia)	Ubiparip	7	2	0	9
6	MF	(Bosnia and Herzegovina)	Zec	3	3	0	6
11	MF	(Serbia)	Blagojević	4	1	0	5
18	FW	(Bosnia and Herzegovina)	Zajmović	3	2	0	5
4	FW	(Bosnia and Herzegovina)	Kajkut	4	0	0	4
9	MF	(Bosnia and Herzegovina)	Ramović	3	1	0	4
20	MF	(Bosnia and Herzegovina)	Zeba	3	0	0	3
5	DF	(Bosnia and Herzegovina)	Graovac	2	1	0	3
23	MF	(Bosnia and Herzegovina)	Vranješ	2	0	0	2
24	FW	(Croatia)	Lendrić	0	0	2	2
39	MF	(Bosnia and Herzegovina)	Žerić	1	0	0	1
27	DF	(Bosnia and Herzegovina)	Osmanković	1	0	0	1
15	DF	(Bosnia and Herzegovina)	Bogičević	1	0	0	1
13	GK	(Bosnia and Herzegovina)	Kjosevski	1	0	0	1
19	MF	(Bosnia and Herzegovina)	Šabanadžović	0	1	0	1
#	Own goals			2	0	0	2
TOTAL				49	16	3	68

Last updated: 19 May 2018

=== Assists ===
No.	Pos.	Nation	Name	Premijer Liga BiH	Kup BiH	Europa League	Total
17	MF	(Bosnia and Herzegovina)	Zakarić	10	2	0	12
9	MF	(Bosnia and Herzegovina)	Ramović	5	4	0	9
51	FW	(Serbia)	Ubiparip	5	1	0	6
16	DF	(Bosnia and Herzegovina)	Stanić	4	0	0	4
23	MF	(Bosnia and Herzegovina)	Vranješ	3	0	0	3
4	FW	(Bosnia and Herzegovina)	Kajkut	2	1	0	3
18	FW	(Bosnia and Herzegovina)	Zajmović	1	2	0	3
33	DF	(Serbia)	Projić	2	0	0	2
11	MF	(Serbia)	Blagojević	2	0	0	2
6	MF	(Bosnia and Herzegovina)	Zec	2	0	0	2
5	DF	(Bosnia and Herzegovina)	Graovac	1	1	0	2
20	MF	(Bosnia and Herzegovina)	Zeba	1	0	1	2
21	FW	(Bosnia and Herzegovina)	Beganović	1	0	0	1
44	MF	(Slovenia)	Elsner	1	0	0	1
2	DF	(Serbia)	Stevanović	1	0	0	0
8	DF	(Bosnia and Herzegovina)	Mehremić	0	1	0	1
39	MF	(Bosnia and Herzegovina)	Žerić	0	1	0	1
15	DF	(Bosnia and Herzegovina)	Bogičević	0	0	1	1
TOTAL				40	13	2	54

Last updated: 19 May 2018

== Transfers ==
=== In ===
No.	Pos.	Nat.	Name	Age	EU	Moving from	Type	Transfer window	Ends	Transfer fee	Source
20	MF	(Bosnia and Herzegovina)	Damir Sadiković	30	Non-EU	Krško (Slovenia)	Loan return	Summer	2018	N/A	
21	FW	(Bosnia and Herzegovina)	Dženis Beganović	29	Non-EU	Metalleghe-BSI	Loan return	Summer	2019	N/A	
30	GK	(Bosnia and Herzegovina)	Aldin Ćeman	30	Non-EU	Goražde	Loan return	Summer	2018	N/A	
18	FW	(Bosnia and Herzegovina)	Dženan Zajmović	30	EU	Travnik	Sign	Summer	2017	Free	fkzeljeznicar.ba
6	MF	(Bosnia and Herzegovina)	Asim Zec	31	Non-EU	Sloboda Tuzla	Sign	Summer	2020	Free	fkzeljeznicar.ba
5	DF	(Bosnia and Herzegovina)	Daniel Graovac	32	EU	Excel Mouscron (Belgium)	Loan	Summer	2018	Free	fkzeljeznicar.ba
9	MF	(Bosnia and Herzegovina)	Sinan Ramović	32	Non-EU	Mladost Doboj Kakanj	Sign	Summer	2020	Free	fkzeljeznicar.ba
33	DF	(Serbia)	Josip Projić	38	Non-EU	Napredak Kruševac (Serbia)	Sign	Summer	2019	Free	fkzeljeznicar.ba
4	FW	(Bosnia and Herzegovina)	Saša Kajkut	41	Non-EU	Zrinjski	Sign	Summer	2018	Free	fkzeljeznicar.ba
44	MF	(Slovenia)	Rok Elsner	39	EU	Domžale (Slovenia)	Sign	Summer	2018	Free	fkzeljeznicar.ba
51	FW	(Serbia)	Vojo Ubiparip	37	Non-EU	Górnik Łęczna (Poland)	Sign	Summer	2018	Free	fkzeljeznicar.ba
12	GK	(Bosnia and Herzegovina)	Aldin Ćeman	30	Non-EU	Iskra	Loan return	Winter	2019	N/A	fkzeljeznicar.ba
8	DF	(Bosnia and Herzegovina)	Adi Mehremić	33	Non-EU	St. Pölten (Austria)	Sign	Winter	2019	Free	fkzeljeznicar.ba
23	DF	(Bosnia and Herzegovina)	Almir Ćubara	27	Non-EU	Bosna Visoko	Sign	Winter	2020	Free	fkzeljeznicar.ba
21	MF	(Bosnia and Herzegovina)	Meldin Jusufi	26	Non-EU	Olimpic	Sign	Winter	2020	Free	fkzeljeznicar.ba
22	DF	(Croatia)	Kenan Hadžić	31	EU	Istra 1961 (Croatia)	Sign	Winter	2019	Free	fkzeljeznicar.ba
23	MF	(Bosnia and Herzegovina)	Stojan Vranješ	38	Non-EU	Piast Gliwice (Poland)	Sign	Winter	2019	Free	fkzeljeznicar.ba
29	MF	(Bosnia and Herzegovina)	Andrej Modić	29	Non-EU	Milan (Italy)	Sign	Winter	2021	Free	fkzeljeznicar.ba

Total expenditure: ▼

=== Out ===
No.	Pos.	Nat.	Name	Age	EU	Moving to	Type	Transfer window	Transfer fee	Source
22	DF	(Nigeria)	Musa Muhammed	28	Non-EU	İstanbul Başakşehir (Turkey)	Loan return	Summer	N/A	
4	DF	(Italy)	Matteo Boccaccini	32	EU	Brescia (Italy)	Loan return	Summer	N/A	
88	MF	(Bosnia and Herzegovina)	Miroslav Stevanović	35	Non-EU	Servette (Switzerland)	End of contract	Summer	Free	
19	DF	(Bosnia and Herzegovina)	Semir Kerla	37	Non-EU	Sūduva (Lithuania)	End of contract	Summer	Free	
18	DF	(Croatia)	Danijel Stojanović	41	EU	Olimpic	Contract termination	Summer	N/A	fkzeljeznicar.ba
20	DF	(Bosnia and Herzegovina)	Damir Sadiković	30	Non-EU	Mladost Doboj Kakanj	Contract termination	Summer	N/A	
30	GK	(Bosnia and Herzegovina)	Aldin Ćeman	30	Non-EU	Iskra	Loan	Summer	Free	
24	FW	(Croatia)	Ivan Lendrić	34	EU	Lens (France)	Transfer	Summer	(€300,000)	fkzeljeznicar.ba
7	DF	(Bosnia and Herzegovina)	Sanel Jahić	43	EU	Free agent	Contract termination	Summer	N/A	fkzeljeznicar.ba
25	MF	(Serbia)	Uglješa Radinović	32	Non-EU	Bačka Bačka Palanka (Serbia)	Contract termination	Summer	N/A	fkzeljeznicar.ba
12	GK	(Bosnia and Herzegovina)	Adnan Bobić	38	Non-EU	Velež	Contract termination	Winter	N/A	fkzeljeznicar.ba
23	FW	(Bosnia and Herzegovina)	Stevo Nikolić	40	Non-EU	Čelik	Contract termination	Winter	N/A	fkzeljeznicar.ba
21	FW	(Bosnia and Herzegovina)	Dženis Beganović	29	Non-EU	Kom (Montenegro)	Contract termination	Winter	N/A	fkzeljeznicar.ba
8	MF	(Montenegro)	Darko Marković	38	Non-EU	Dečić (Montenegro)	Contract termination	Winter	N/A	fkzeljeznicar.ba
16	DF	(Bosnia and Herzegovina)	Srđan Stanić	36	EU	Zrinjski	End of contract	Winter	Free	fkzeljeznicar.ba
44	MF	(Slovenia)	Rok Elsner	39	EU	Triglav Kranj (Slovenia)	Contract termination	Winter	N/A	fkzeljeznicar.ba
29	MF	(Bosnia and Herzegovina)	Aldin Hrvanović	27	Non-EU	Sloboda Tuzla	Contract termination	Winter	N/A	
14	MF	(Bosnia and Herzegovina)	Dino Hasanović	29	Non-EU	GOŠK Gabela	Contract termination	Winter	N/A	fkzeljeznicar.ba
30	FW	(Bosnia and Herzegovina)	Mirza Šubo	27	Non-EU	Iskra	Loan	Winter	Free	fkzeljeznicar.ba
31	DF	(Bosnia and Herzegovina)	Benjamin Šehić	26	Non-EU	Iskra	Loan	Winter	Free	fkzeljeznicar.ba
22	GK	(Bosnia and Herzegovina)	Vernes Karavdić	27	Non-EU	Iskra	Loan	Winter	Free	fkzeljeznicar.ba
10	MF	(Bosnia and Herzegovina)	Samir Bekrić	41	Non-EU	Zrinjski	Contract termination	Winter	N/A	fkzeljeznicar.ba
32	DF	(Bosnia and Herzegovina)	Haris Kurtović	26	Non-EU	Iskra	Loan	Winter	Free	
24	FW	(Bosnia and Herzegovina)	Ajdin Mujagić	27	Non-EU	Travnik	Loan	Winter	Free	fkzeljeznicar.ba

Total income: ▲ (€300,000)

== Club ==
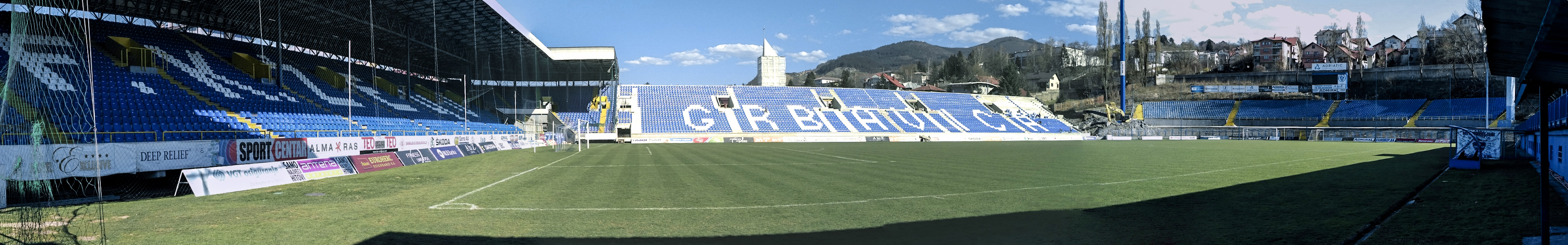
A panoramic view of Grbavica Stadium, spring 2017

=== Coaching staff ===
Name	Role
(Bosnia and Herzegovina) Admir Adžem	Head coach
(Bosnia and Herzegovina) Saša Papac	Director of Sports
(Bosnia and Herzegovina) Asmir Džafić	Assistant coach
(Bosnia and Herzegovina) Elvis Karić	Goalkeeping coach
(Bosnia and Herzegovina) Nedim Čović	Fitness coach
(Bosnia and Herzegovina) Raif Zeba	Physiotherapist
(Bosnia and Herzegovina) Mirza Halvadžija	Physiotherapist
(Bosnia and Herzegovina) Tarik Zolotić	Nutritionist
(Bosnia and Herzegovina) Erdijan Pekić	Commissioner for Security
(Bosnia and Herzegovina) Zlatko Dervišević	Doctor
(Bosnia and Herzegovina) Edin Kulenović	Doctor
(Bosnia and Herzegovina) Mahir Moro	Doctor

=== Other information ===
Honorary Chairman of the Club	(Socialist Federal Republic of Yugoslavia) (Bosnia and Herzegovina) Ivica Osim
Chairman of the Assembly	(Bosnia and Herzegovina) Adis Hadžić
Chairman of the Supervisory Board	(Bosnia and Herzegovina) Marko Dmitrović
Chairman of the Board	(Bosnia and Herzegovina) Senad Misimović
Director	(Bosnia and Herzegovina) Mirsad Šiljak
Director of Sports	(Bosnia and Herzegovina) Saša Papac
Head coach	(Bosnia and Herzegovina) Admir Adžem
Ground (capacity and dimensions)	Grbavica Stadium (12,000 / 105x66 m)

Source: Željezničar and Grbavica Stadium

=== Sponsorship ===
As of 4 April 2018

Name	Type
(Turkey) Ziraat Bank	General sponsor
(Italy) UniCredit Bank	Gold sponsor
(Austria) Adriatic Group	Gold sponsor
(United States) A to Z Group	Gold sponsor
(Bosnia and Herzegovina) Sarajevo Osiguranje	Gold sponsor
(Bosnia and Herzegovina) Lutrija BiH	Gold sponsor
(Bosnia and Herzegovina) Telemach	Blue sponsor
(Bosnia and Herzegovina) Poliklinika Atrijum	Blue sponsor
(United Kingdom) Admiral Casino	Blue sponsor
(Bosnia and Herzegovina) antenanet	Sponsor
(Bosnia and Herzegovina) Elpi	Sponsor
(Bosnia and Herzegovina) Bony	Sponsor
(Bosnia and Herzegovina) SBC	Sponsor
(France) Hotel Novotel	Sponsor
(Bosnia and Herzegovina) Milkos	Sponsor
(Bosnia and Herzegovina) Klas	Sponsor
(Slovenia) Europlakat	Sponsor
(Bosnia and Herzegovina) Hotel Hills	Sponsor
(Bosnia and Herzegovina) Atos osiguranje	Sponsor
(Bosnia and Herzegovina) Tržnice-Pijace	Sponsor
(Sweden) Securitas	Sponsor
(Bosnia and Herzegovina) ALMA RAS	Sponsor
(Bosnia and Herzegovina) HOTEL EXCLUSIVE	Sponsor
(Bosnia and Herzegovina) Slatko i slano	Sponsor
(Italy) Mark Medical	Sponsor
(Bosnia and Herzegovina) In Time	Sponsor
(Bosnia and Herzegovina) Apoteka Dina	Sponsor
(Bosnia and Herzegovina) Hadžo stil	Sponsor
(Bosnia and Herzegovina) Kristal	Sponsor
(Germany) Mann Hummel	Sponsor
(Bosnia and Herzegovina) Mikrokreditna fondacija Sunrise	Sponsor
(Bosnia and Herzegovina) Sarajevsko pivo	Sponsor
(Bosnia and Herzegovina) Euroherc	Sponsor
(Croatia) Sky Cola	Sponsor
(Italy) Manuel Caffè	Sponsor
(Bosnia and Herzegovina) PENNY PLUS	Sponsor
(Croatia) Deep Relief	Sponsor
(Bosnia and Herzegovina) ASA	Sponsor
(Bosnia and Herzegovina) Ugarak	Sponsor
(Bosnia and Herzegovina) BBI	Sponsor
(Bosnia and Herzegovina) Hotel Grand	Sponsor
(Bosnia and Herzegovina) Fixit	Technical sponsor
(Bosnia and Herzegovina) Tehno Mag	Technical sponsor
(Bosnia and Herzegovina) PAL-e	Technical sponsor
(Turkey) Jeordie's	Technical sponsor
(Italy) Diadora	Technical sponsor
(Bosnia and Herzegovina) Centrotrans	Technical sponsor
(Bosnia and Herzegovina) General Logistic	Technical sponsor
(Bosnia and Herzegovina) BiH.ba	Media partner
(Turkey) Anadolu Agency	Media partner
(Bosnia and Herzegovina) Hayat	Media partner
(Bosnia and Herzegovina) Antena Sarajevo	Media partner
(Bosnia and Herzegovina) Sport1.ba	Media partner
(Bosnia and Herzegovina) Klix.ba	Media partner
(Bosnia and Herzegovina) Dnevni avaz	Media partner
(Bosnia and Herzegovina) MFS-Emmaus	Community partner
(Bosnia and Herzegovina) SUMERO	Community partner
(Bosnia and Herzegovina) Ruku na srce	Community partner

== Competitions ==
=== Pre-season ===
19 June 2016	Željezničar (Bosnia and Herzegovina)	1–0	(Bosnia and Herzegovina) Krupa	Kupres, BiH
17:00	Lendrić 11'	Report

23 June 2016	Željezničar (Bosnia and Herzegovina)	1–1	(Bosnia and Herzegovina) Široki Brijeg	Tomislavgrad, BiH
17:00	Žerić 72'	Report	Čabraja 8'

=== Mid-season ===
30 August 2017	Borac Jelah (Bosnia and Herzegovina)	1–0	(Bosnia and Herzegovina) Željezničar	Jelah, BiH
17:00	Zizo 77'	Report		Stadium: Stadion Šibovi

3 September 2017	Željezničar (Bosnia and Herzegovina)	1–0	(Bosnia and Herzegovina) Vitez	Rijeka, BiH
17:00	Zajmović 87'	Report		Stadium: Stadion NK Rijeka

13 January 2018	Željezničar (Bosnia and Herzegovina)	3–2	(Bosnia and Herzegovina) Željezničar U19	Sarajevo, BiH
12:00	Ramović 11'; Zakarić 44'; Zajmović 68'	Report	Žerić 32'; Mujagić 35'

20 January 2018	Željezničar (Bosnia and Herzegovina)	3–1	Croatia Zmijavci	Međugorje, BiH
14:00	Zec 13'; Kajkut 70'; Crnov 88'	Report	Stipić 3'

27 January 2018	Željezničar (Bosnia and Herzegovina)	1–1	(Bulgaria) Etar	Antalya, Turkey
15:00	Zec 77'		Mladenov 71'

31 January 2018	Željezničar (Bosnia and Herzegovina)	2–3	(Slovakia) DAC Dunajská Streda	Antalya, Turkey
13:30	Žerić 5'; Ubiparip 36'	Report	Černák 18'; Davis 62'; Vida 85'

4 February 2018	Željezničar (Bosnia and Herzegovina)	0–5	(Ukraine) Zorya Luhansk	Antalya, Turkey
15:00		Report	Hromov 3', 31'; Cheberko 27'; Iury 36'; Sukhar 76'

10 February 2018	Velež (Bosnia and Herzegovina)	0–0	(Bosnia and Herzegovina) Željezničar	Mostar, BiH
14:00		Report		Stadium: Vrapčići Stadium

11 February 2018	Bosna Visoko (Bosnia and Herzegovina)	2–4	(Bosnia and Herzegovina) Željezničar	Visoko, BiH
14:00	Vila 30'; Hodzic 75'	Report	Kajkut 12'; Zajmovic 28'; Mujagic 56', 63'

20 February 2018	Željezničar (Bosnia and Herzegovina)	4–0	(Bosnia and Herzegovina) Rudar Kakanj	Sarajevo, BiH
12:30	Mujagić 3'; Modić 20'; Zajmović 40', 60'	Report

=== Overall ===
Competition	Started round	Final result	First match	Last Match
Premijer Liga BiH	—	2nd	24 July 2017	
Kup BiH	Round of 32	Winners	20 September 2017	9 May 2018
UEFA Europa League	1Q	2Q	29 June 2017	20 July 2017
UEFA Youth League	1R	Play-offs	27 September 2017	7 February 2018

=== Regular season table ===
Pos	Team	Pld	W	D	L	GF	GA	GD	Pts	Qualification
1	Zrinjski Mostar	22	16	2	4	40	18	+22	50	Qualification for the Championship round
2	Željezničar Sarajevo	22	16	2	4	37	16	+21	50	Qualification for the Championship round
3	Široki Brijeg	22	13	3	6	37	17	+20	42	Qualification for the Championship round
4	Sarajevo	22	12	4	6	44	19	+25	40	Qualification for the Championship round
5	Krupa	22	9	8	5	29	23	+6	35	Qualification for the Championship round

Source: Football Association of Bosnia and Herzegovina, Soccerway, UEFA
Rules for classification: 1) Points; 2) Goal difference; 3) Goals scored; 4) Head-to-head points; 5) Head-to-head goal difference; 6) Head-to-head away goals (only if two teams); 7) Head-to-head goals scored; 8) Goal difference; 9) Play-off. (Criteria 2 and 3 are not used to decide champion, UEFA competition qualification, or relegation)

==== Results summary ====
Overall								Home						Away					
Pld	W	D	L	GF	GA	GD	Pts	W	D	L	GF	GA	GD	W	D	L	GF	GA	GD
22	16	2	4	37	16	+21	50	9	1	1	21	8	+13	7	1	3	16	8	+8

Last updated: 7 March 2018.
Source: Sportsport.ba

==== Results by round ====
Round	1	2	3	4	5	6	7	8	9	10	11	12	13	14	15	16	17	18	19	20	21	22
Ground	H	A	H	H	A	H	A	H	A	H	A	A	H	A	A	H	A	H	A	H	A	H
Result	W	L	W	W	W	D	W	W	L	L	W	W	W	D	W	W	W	W	W	W	L	W
Position	1	5	4	2	1	3	2	2	2	3	2	3	2	3	2	2	1	1	1	1	2	2

Updated to match(es) played on 7 March 2018. Source: Competitions
A = Away; H = Home; W = Win; D = Draw; L = Loss

==== Matches ====
24 July 2017 1	Željezničar	3–1	GOŠK Gabela	Sarajevo
20:30	Blagojević 16'; Zakarić 44'; Zeba 51' (pen.); Stevanović (yellow card) 75'	Report	Bošnjak (yellow card) 40'; Dodig (yellow card) 40'; Anković 86'	Stadium: Grbavica Stadium; Attendance: 5,500; Referee: Elvis Mujić (Banovići)

29 July 2017 2	Mladost Doboj Kakanj	2–1	Željezničar	Doboj
17:30	Lazić 1'; Aganspahić 7'; Hiroš (yellow card) 19'; Čomor (yellow card) 50'; Karahmet (yellow card) 53'; Isaković (yellow card) 53'; Metalsi (yellow card) 85'	Report	Zec (yellow card) 51'; Projić (yellow card) 60'; Graovac (yellow card) 75'; Osmanković 84', (yellow card) 90'; Blagojević (yellow card) 90'	Stadium: MGM Farm; Attendance: 2,200; Referee: Ilija Živković (Orašje)

5 August 2017 3	Željezničar	1–0	Vitez	Sarajevo
20:30	Stevanović (yellow card) 23'; Ćosić 64' (o.g.)	Report	Vranjić (yellow card) 12'; Mamić (yellow card) 52'; Brekalo (yellow card) 61'; Đerić (yellow card) 90'	Stadium: Grbavica Stadium; Attendance: 3,000; Referee: Emir Spahalić (Mostar)

12 August 2017 4	Željezničar	2–1	Borac Banja Luka	Sarajevo
20:30	Ramović (yellow card) 56'; Kajkut 61'; Zec 69'; Bogičević (yellow card) 90'	Report	Raspudić 15'; Mirković (yellow card) 27'; Puzigaća (yellow card) 59'; Veselinović (yellow card) 74'; Karić (yellow card) 90+4'	Stadium: Grbavica Stadium; Attendance: 4,500; Referee: Tomislav Čuić (Tomislavgrad)

19 August 2017 5	Sarajevo	0–1	Željezničar	Sarajevo
20:00	Ivetić (red card) 3'; Kadušić (yellow card) 9'; Mihojević (yellow card) 29'; Stanojević (yellow card) 29'; Novaković (yellow card) 57'	Report	Zeba 4' (pen.); Zakarić (yellow card) 17'; Ramović (yellow card) 32' (yellow-red card) 37'; Šabanadžović (yellow card) 90'	Stadium: Asim Ferhatović Hase Stadium; Attendance: 10,000; Referee: Tomislav Čuić (Tomislavgrad)

26 August 2017 6	Željezničar	0–0	Široki Brijeg	Sarajevo
20:00	Kajkut (yellow card) 11'; Stevanović (yellow card) 71'; Graovac (yellow card) 73' (yellow-red card) 89'; Projić (yellow card) 82'; Mujagić (yellow card) 85'	Report	Matić (yellow card) 21'; Ćorić (yellow card) 77'	Stadium: Grbavica Stadium; Attendance: 7,000; Referee: Vladimir Bjelica (East Sarajevo)

10 September 2017 7	Radnik	0–2	Željezničar	Bijeljina
16:30	Franić (yellow card) 10'	Report	Zeba 12' (pen.); Stanić (yellow card) 32'; Zakarić 44'; Beganović (yellow card) 57' (yellow-red card) 71'; Blagojević (yellow card) 76'	Stadium: Gradski stadion Attendance: 500; Referee: Zoran Grbić (Prijedor)

17 September 2017 8	Željezničar	4–1	Krupa	Sarajevo
19:30	Zakarić 34', 54'; Ramović 37'; Blagojević 84'	Report	Vukotić (yellow card) 10' (yellow-red card) 90'; Koljić 90+3'	Stadium: Grbavica Stadium; Attendance: 3,500; Referee: Ermin Sivac (Zenica)

23 September 2017 9	Sloboda Tuzla	1–0	Željezničar	Tuzla
19:00	Ćulum (yellow card) 18'; Krpić 38'; Lazevski (yellow card) 56'	Report	Graovac (yellow card) 24' (yellow-red card) 90'; Ramović (yellow card) 70'; Stevanović (yellow card) 83'; Bogičević (yellow card) 89'	Stadium: Tušanj City Stadium; Attendance: 3,500; Referee: Ognjen Valjić (Banja Luka)

30 September 2017 10	Željezničar	0–1	Zrinjski	Sarajevo
20:00	Bogičević (yellow card) 64'; Stevanović (yellow card) 90'	Report	Čirjak (yellow card) 33'; Bilbija 41'; Perišić (yellow card) 66'; Jamak (yellow card) 80'; Handžić (yellow card) 90'	Stadium: Grbavica Stadium; Attendance: 6,000; Referee: Elvis Mujić (Banovići)

15 October 2017 11	Čelik	0–3	Željezničar	Zenica
18:00	Mehić (yellow card) 27'; Salčinović (yellow card) 39'; Šabanović (yellow card) 78'	Report	Kajkut 35' (pen.); Stanić (yellow card) 45'; Blagojević 65'; Zakarić 70', (yellow card) 75'	Stadium: Bilino Polje Stadium; Attendance: 3,000; Referee: Dragan Petrović (Banja Luka)

22 October 2017 12	GOŠK Gabela	0–1	Željezničar	Gabela
15:00	Odak (yellow card) 6'; Bošnjak (yellow card) 64'; Radeljić (yellow card) 65'; Ereiz (yellow card) 87'	Report	Ubiparip 1'; Bogičević (yellow card) 18'; Šabanadžović (yellow card) 33'	Stadium: Stadium Perica-Pero Pavlović; Attendance: 1,000; Referee: Ermin Sivac (Zenica)

28 October 2017 13	Željezničar	2–0	Mladost Doboj Kakanj	Sarajevo
16:30	Zakarić 14', 36'; Šabanadžović (yellow card) 44'; Ramović (yellow card) 80'	Report	Arežina (yellow card) 40' (yellow-red card) 83'; Šećerović (yellow card) 63'; Benović (yellow card) 77'	Stadium: Grbavica Stadium; Attendance: 3,500; Referee: Goran Paradžik (Ljubuški)

4 November 2017 14	Vitez	1–1	Željezničar	Vitez
13:30	Brekalo (yellow card) 17'; Novak (yellow card) 19'; Livaja 24'; Karić (yellow card) 36'; Karić (yellow card) 71'; Stanić (yellow card) 86'	Report	Elsner (yellow card) 23'; Stanić (yellow card) 50'; Ubiparip 56'; Hajdarević (yellow card) 89'	Stadium: Gradski stadion Attendance: 1,000; Referee: Ilija Živković (Orašje)

19 November 2017 15	Borac Banja Luka	0–1	Željezničar	Banja Luka
18:00	Janičić (yellow card) 45'; Karić (yellow card) 68'; Ojdanić (yellow card) 81'	Report	Ubiparip (yellow card) 31'; Zec (yellow card) 61', (goal) 71'	Stadium: Banja Luka City Stadium; Attendance: 7,000; Referee: Elvis Mujić (Banovići)

27 November 2017 16	Željezničar	2–1	Sarajevo	Sarajevo
13:00	Zakarić 23'; Stevanović (yellow card) 73'; Ramović 77'; Fejzić (yellow card) 90'	Report	Stanojević (yellow card) 45'; Sarić (yellow card) 74'; Rahmanović 86', (yellow card) 88'; Ahmetović (yellow card) 90'	Stadium: Grbavica Stadium; Attendance: 5,500; Referee: Irfan Peljto (Sarajevo)

3 December 2017 17	Široki Brijeg	1–2	Željezničar	Široki Brijeg
16:00	Menalo 3'; Matić (yellow card) 58'; Lončar (yellow card) 72'	Report	Kajkut 15'; Blagojević (yellow card) 83'; Ramović (yellow card) 89'; Žerić 90+1'	Stadium: Pecara Stadium; Attendance: 2,000; Referee: Elvis Mujić (Banovići)

10 December 2017 18	Željezničar	3–2	Radnik	Sarajevo
14:00	Projić (yellow card) 38'; Kajkut 47'; Graovac 58'; Zakarić 70' (pen.); Mujagić (yellow card) 90'	Report	Hadžić 31'; Okić 44'; Šerbečić (yellow card) 58' (yellow-red card) 69'	Stadium: Grbavica Stadium; Attendance: 4,000; Referee: Tomislav Ćujić (Tomislavgrad)

16 February 2018 19	Krupa	2–4	Željezničar	Krupa na Vrbasu
14:30	Aleksić 35', (yellow card) 56'; Milanović 54'	Report	Ubiparip 9', 26'; Zakarić 47' (pen.), 76'; Graovac (yellow card) 85'	Stadium: Stadion FK Krupa; Attendance: 1,500; Referee: Ilija Živković (Orašje)

24 February 2018 20	Željezničar	1–0	Sloboda Tuzla	Sarajevo
14:30	Graovac 64'; Mehremić (yellow card) 68'; Stevanović (yellow card) 71'; Kjosevski (yellow card) 90+1'	Report	Mijić (yellow card) 29'; Muminović (yellow card) 60'; Ivetić (yellow card) 80'	Stadium: Grbavica Stadium; Attendance: 4,000; Referee: Dragan Petrović (Banja Luka)

3 March 2018 21	Zrinjski	1–0	Željezničar	Mostar
14:30	Pezer 36'; Handžić (yellow card) 41'; Kadušić (yellow card) 45'; Barišić (yellow card) 45'; Todorović (yellow card) 51'; Bilbija (yellow card) 81'		Mehremić (yellow card) 43'; Ubiparip (yellow card) 51'; Graovac (yellow card) 57'; Bogičević (yellow card) 57'; Stevanović (yellow card) 80'	Stadium: Stadion pod Bijelim Brijegom; Referee: Elvis Mujić (Banovići)

7 March 2018 22	Željezničar	3–1	Čelik	Sarajevo
15:00	Zajmović 19'; Ubiparip 64'; Blagojević 68'; Stevanović (yellow card) 84'	Report	Pandža (yellow card) 59'; Duvnjak (yellow card) 70'; Kadrić 84'	Stadium: Grbavica Stadium; Attendance: 2,200; Referee: Zoran Grbić (Prijedor)

=== Championship round table ===
Pos	Team	Pld	W	D	L	GF	GA	GD	Pts	Qualification
1	Zrinjski Mostar (C)	32	21	6	5	58	30	+28	69	Qualification for the Champions League first qualifying round
2	Željezničar Sarajevo	32	19	6	7	49	30	+19	63	Qualification for the Europa League first qualifying round
3	Sarajevo	32	17	5	10	58	28	+30	56	Qualification for the Europa League first qualifying round
4	Široki Brijeg	32	16	8	8	52	28	+24	56	Qualification for the Europa League first qualifying round
5	Radnik Bijeljina	32	12	9	11	35	38	−3	45	

Source: Football Association of Bosnia and Herzegovina, UEFA, Soccerway
Rules for classification: 1) Points; 2) Goal difference; 3) Goals scored; 4) Head-to-head points; 5) Head-to-head goal difference; 6) Head-to-head away goals (only if two teams); 7) Head-to-head goals scored; 8) Goal difference; 9) Play-off. (Criteria 2 and 3 are not used to decide champion, UEFA competition qualification, or relegation)
(C) Champions

==== Results summary ====
Overall								Home						Away					
Pld	W	D	L	GF	GA	GD	Pts	W	D	L	GF	GA	GD	W	D	L	GF	GA	GD
31	18	6	7	47	29	+18	60	11	4	1	27	12	+15	7	2	6	20	17	+3

Last updated: 13 May 2018.
Source: Sportsport.ba

==== Results by round ====
Round	1	2	3	4	5	6	7	8	9	10
Ground	H	A	H	H	A	A	H	A	A	H
Result	W	D	W	D	D	L	D	L	L	W
Position	1	1	1	1	2	2	2	2	2	2

Updated to match(es) played on 13 May 2018. Source: Competitions
A = Away; H = Home; W = Win; D = Draw; L = Loss

==== Matches ====
11 March 2018 1	Željezničar	1–0	Krupa	Sarajevo
15:00	Vranješ (yellow card) 27'; Ubiparip 65'; Ramović (yellow card) 75'	Report	Fajić (yellow card) 50'; Balabanović (yellow card) 52'	Stadium: Grbavica Stadium; Attendance: 4,500; Referee: Tomislav Čuić (Tomislavgrad)

17 March 2018 2	Zrinjski	3–3	Željezničar	Mostar
15:00	Jakovljević (yellow card) 86'; Jović 88'; Aćimović 90'; Bogičević 90' (o.g.)	Report	Barišić 8' (o.g.); Blagojević (yellow card) 9'; Vranješ 27'; Zakarić (yellow card) 72', (goal) 86' (pen.); Mehremić (yellow card) 90'	Stadium: Stadion pod Bijelim Brijegom; Attendance: 3,500; Referee: Dragan Petrović (Banja Luka)

31 March 2018 3	Željezničar	2–1	Radnik	Sarajevo
16:00	Vranješ 5'; Zajmović 7'; Osmanković (yellow card) 90'	Report	Okić (yellow card) 53'; Franić 57'; Zec (yellow card) 58'; Beširević (yellow card) 74'	Stadium: Grbavica Stadium; Attendance: 5,000; Referee: Goran Paradžik (Ljubuški)

7 April 2018 4	Željezničar	1–1	Široki Brijeg	Sarajevo
16:30	Hajdarević (yellow card) 66'; Mehremić (yellow card) 77'; Kjosevski 90+3'	Report	Bagarić 36'; Bandić (yellow card) 89'	Stadium: Grbavica Stadium; Attendance: 6,500; Referee: Zoran Grbić (Prijedor)

15 April 2018 5	Sarajevo	0–0	Željezničar	Sarajevo
16:30	Kuzmanović (yellow card) 76'; Velkovski (yellow card) 90'	Report	Bogičević (yellow card) 71'	Stadium: Asim Ferhatović Hase Stadium; Attendance: 6,000; Referee: Elvis Mujić (Banovići)

21 April 2018 6	Krupa	2–0	Željezničar	Krupa na Vrbasu
17:00	Fajić 31'; Marjanović 57', (yellow card) 58'	Report	Ramović (yellow card) 90'	Stadium: Stadion FK Krupa; Referee: Tomislav Čuić (Tomislavgrad)

27 April 2018 7	Željezničar	2–2	Zrinjski	Sarajevo
19:00	Hajdarević (yellow card) 12'; Graovac (yellow card) 45'; Bogičević 49'; Mehremić (yellow card) 61'; Zakarić (yellow card) 66'; Zec 80'; Blagojević (yellow card) 84'	Report	Stanić (yellow card) 64'; Hajdarević 67'; Handžić 90'; Bencun (yellow card) 90+3'	Stadium: Grbavica Stadium; Referee: Elvis Mujić (Banovići)

5 May 2018 8	Radnik	1–0	Željezničar	Bijeljina
16:30	Vasić (yellow card) 33'; Zec (yellow card) 38'; Beširević 84'	Report	Projić (yellow card) 41'; Blagojević (yellow card) 59'; Graovac (yellow card) 79'; Osmanković (yellow card) 88'	Stadium: Gradski stadion Attendance: 500; Referee: Zoran Grbić (Prijedor)

13 May 2018 9	Široki Brijeg	3–1	Željezničar	Široki Brijeg
16:30				Stadium: Pecara Stadium

10	Željezničar	2–1	Sarajevo	Sarajevo
				Stadium: Grbavica Stadium

=== Kup BiH ===
==== Round of 32 ====
20 September 2017	Metalleghe-BSI	0–1	Željezničar	Jajce
16:00	Goloman (yellow card) 25'; Kukavica (yellow card) 54'; Hota (yellow card) 60'; Handžić (yellow card) 69'	Report	Zec 3'; Zeba (yellow card) 59'; Beganović (yellow card) 70'; Projić (yellow card) 87'; Hajdarević (yellow card) 90'	Stadium: Stadion Mračaj; Attendance: 800; Referee: Miloš Gigović (Gradiška)

==== Round of 16 ====
25 October 2017	Željezničar	2–1	Mladost Doboj Kakanj	Sarajevo
18:00	Hajdarević (yellow card) 34'; Zec 51'; Zakarić (yellow card) 67'; Stanić (yellow card) 84'; Zakarić 85' (pen.); Ubiparip (yellow card) 86'	Report	Lazić (yellow card) 26'; Metalsi (yellow card) 66'; Mujagić 69'; Šećerović (yellow card) 71'; Mišić (yellow card) 78'; Benović (yellow card) 82'; Isaković (yellow card) 84' (yellow-red card) 90'; Velić (yellow card) 84'; Čomor (yellow card) 91'	Stadium: Grbavica Stadium; Attendance: 1,500; Referee: Dragan Petrović (Banja Luka)

==== Quarter-finals ====
30 November 2017 First leg	Široki Brijeg	0–1	Željezničar	Široki Brijeg
17:00	Menalo (yellow card) 7'	Report	Stevanović (yellow card) 7'; Šabanadžović 87'	Stadium: Pecara Stadium; Attendance: 2,500; Referee: Vladimir Bjelica (East Sarajevo)

7 December 2017 Second leg	Željezničar	2–0 (3–0 agg.)	Široki Brijeg	Sarajevo
13:00	Blagojević 7'; Zec 54'; Projić (yellow card) 56'; Stevanović (yellow card) 86'	Report	Milićević (yellow card) 56'; Kožul (yellow card) 80'	Stadium: Grbavica Stadium; Attendance: 3,000; Referee: Dragan Petrović (Banja Luka)

==== Semi-finals ====
11 April 2018 First leg	Željezničar	0–0	Sloboda Tuzla	Sarajevo
18:00	Vranješ (yellow card) 79'	Report	Rustemović (yellow card) 45'	Stadium: Grbavica Stadium; Referee: Tomislav Ćuić (Tomislavgrad)

18 April 2018 Second leg	Sloboda Tuzla	1–4 (1–4 agg.)	Željezničar	Tuzla
18:00	Husić (yellow card) 7'; Osmanagić 18'; Todorović (yellow card) 74'		Mehremić (yellow card) 11'; Zakarić 36', 43', 75'; Ubiparip 53'; Bogičević (yellow card) 58'	Stadium: Tušanj City Stadium; Referee: Dragan Petrović (Banja Luka)

==== Finals ====
2 May 2018 First leg	Željezničar	2–0	Krupa	Sarajevo
17:30	Mehremić (yellow card) 22'; Šabanadžović (yellow card) 31'; Zajmović 36'; Zakarić (yellow card) 40'; Graovac 65'; Bogičević (yellow card) 81'; Ramović (yellow card) 84'	Report	Dujaković (yellow card) 24'	Stadium: Grbavica Stadium; Attendance: 3,600; Referee: Dragan Petrović (Banja Luka)

9 May 2018 Second leg	Krupa	0–4 (0–6 agg.)	Željezničar	Krupa na Vrbasu
17:00	Milanović (yellow card) 23'; Balabanović (yellow card) 23'; Šamara (yellow card) 65'	Report	Ubiparip 33'; Zajmović 45'; Zakarić 63'; Ramović 83'	Stadium: Stadion FK Krupa; Attendance: 2,700; Referee: Irfan Peljto (Sarajevo)

=== UEFA Europa League ===
==== First round ====
29 June 2017 First leg	Željezničar (Bosnia and Herzegovina)	1–0	(Montenegro) Zeta	Sarajevo, BiH
20:45	Lendrić (yellow card) 14', (goal) 48'; Radinović (yellow card) 55'; Žerić (yellow card) 77'	Report		Stadium: Grbavica Stadium; Attendance: 8,858; Referee: Kirill Levnikov (Russia)

6 July 2017 Second leg	Zeta (Montenegro)	2–2 (2–3 agg.)	(Bosnia and Herzegovina) Željezničar	Podgorica, Montenegro
20:30	Kukuličić 29', (yellow card) 35'; Đukić (yellow card) 31'; Krštović 76', (yellow card) 90+3'	Report	Radinović (yellow card) 12'; Zakarić 32'; Lendrić 61'; Zec (yellow card) 69'; Bogičević (yellow card) 80'; Graovac (yellow card) 90+3'	Stadium: Podgorica City Stadium; Attendance: 2,500; Referee: Tiago Martins (Portugal)

==== Second round ====
13 July 2017 First leg	Željezničar (Bosnia and Herzegovina)	0–0	(Sweden) AIK	Sarajevo, BiH
20:50	Projić (yellow card) 74'; Marković (yellow card) 88'; Zakarić (yellow card) 90+2'	Report		Stadium: Grbavica Stadium; Attendance: 11,170; Referee: Adrien Jaccottet (Switzerland)

20 July 2017 Second leg	AIK (Sweden)	2–0 (2–0 agg.)	(Bosnia and Herzegovina) Željezničar	Solna, Sweden
19:00	Karlsson (yellow card) 30'; Johansson (yellow card) 41', (goal) 48'; Goitom 85', (yellow card) 90+1'	Report	Blagojević (yellow card) 25'; Graovac (yellow card) 40+2'; Zeba (yellow card) 47'; Bogičević (yellow card) 51'; Projić (yellow card) 79'; Radinović (yellow card) 89'	Stadium: Friends Arena; Attendance: 9,126; Referee: Georgios Kominis (Greece)

=== UEFA Youth League ===
==== First round ====
27 September 2017 First leg	Ludogorets Razgrad (Bulgaria)	1–1	(Bosnia and Herzegovina) Željezničar	Sofia, Bulgaria
15:00	Beširević 88' (o.g.); Petrov (yellow card) 90+3'	Report	Mujagić 63'; Hajdarević (yellow card) 75'	Stadium: PFC Ludogorets 1945 Training Centre; Referee: Alexandru Tean (Moldova)

18 October 2017 Second leg	Željezničar (Bosnia and Herzegovina)	3–2 (4–3 agg.)	(Bulgaria) Ludogorets Razgrad	Sarajevo, BiH
18:00	Dacić 3', (yellow card) 90+4'; A. Šehić (yellow card) 34'; Hajdarević (yellow card) 49', (goal) 90+3'; Mujagić 56'		Klimentov 7', (yellow card) 33'; Minchev (yellow card) 18'; Milkov 70'; Dimitrov (yellow card) 90+1'; Naumov (yellow card) 90+2'	Stadium: Grbavica Stadium; Referee: Anastasios Papapetrou (Greece)

==== Second round ====
31 October 2017 First leg	Lokomotiva (Croatia)	1–1	(Bosnia and Herzegovina) Željezničar	Zagreb, Croatia
14:00	Krajinović (yellow card) 39'; Dunić (yellow card) 45+1'; Vranjković (yellow card) 54' (yellow-red card) 78', (goal) 74'; Skansi (yellow card) 81'	Report	Beširević 41'; E. Šehić (yellow card) 45'; Zilić (yellow card) 56'; Šabanadžović (yellow card) 70'; Mujagić (yellow card) 72'	Stadium: Stadion Lučko; Referee: Oleksandr Derdo (Ukraine)

22 November 2017 Second leg	Željezničar (Bosnia and Herzegovina)	0–0 (1–1 agg.)	(Croatia) Lokomotiva	Sarajevo, BiH
16:00	Šabanadžović (yellow card) 25'	Report	Brezina (yellow card) 38'; Krajinović (yellow card) 80'	Stadium: Grbavica Stadium; Referee: Juri Frischer (Estonia)

==== Play-offs ====
7 February 2018	Željezničar (Bosnia and Herzegovina)	1–3	(Spain) Atlético Madrid	Sarajevo, BiH
16:00	E. Šehić 9'	Report	Garcés 27', 32'; Agüero 68'	Stadium: Grbavica Stadium; Referee: Mete Kalkavan (Turkey)
