= Amir Velić =

Bosnian footballer

Personal information
- Date of birth: 28 March 1999 (age 27)
- Place of birth: Sarajevo, Bosnia and Herzegovina
- Height: 1.85 m (6 ft 1 in)
- Position: Centre-back

Team information
- Current team: Bratstvo Gračanica
- Number: 15

Youth career
- –2017: Željezničar

Senior career*
Years	Team	Apps	(Gls)
2017–2018	Željezničar	1	(0)
2018–2019	Bosna Visoko	26	(0)
2019–2020	Orašje	14	(0)
2020–2021	Goražde	28	(0)
2021–2025	Igman Konjic	74	(1)
2025–2026	Rabotnicki	13	(0)
2026–	Bratstvo Gračanica	1	(0)

International career
2015–2016	Bosnia and Herzegovina U17	9	(0)
2017–2018	Bosnia and Herzegovina U19	5	(0)
- * Club domestic league appearances and goals as of 15 March 2026

Amir Velić (born 28 March 1999) is a Bosnian professional footballer who plays as a centre-back for Bosnian First League club Bratstvo Gračanica.

== Club career ==
=== Early career ===
Velić started off his career at the youth team of Željezničar, after which he was called up to the first team in 2017.

He stayed at the first team of Željezničar for one year, until 2018. During that time, he made one appearance for the club, in a 0–2 away win against Radnik Bijeljina on 10 September 2017.

He won the Bosnian Cup with Željezničar in the 2017–18 season. He left the club in June 2018.

In July 2018, alongside teammate Almir Ćubara, Velić signed with First League of FBiH club Bosna Visoko. He made his debut for Bosna Visoko on 11 August 2018, in a 1–0 away loss against Jedinstvo Bihać. In the 2018–19 First League of FBiH season, with Bosna, Velić got relegated to the Second League of FBiH (Group Center).

In July 2019, Velić signed a contract with Orašje. His first appearance for Orašje was on 10 August 2019, in a 1–0 home league win against Rudar Kakanj. Velić then joined Goražde in January 2020.

== International career ==
Velić played for the Bosnia and Herzegovina U17 and the Bosnia and Herzegovina U19 national teams, making 9 and 5 caps respectively for both teams, but did not score a goal for neither.

== Career statistics ==
=== Club ===
As of match played 14 November 2020.

Appearances and goals by club, season and competition
Club	Season	League			Cup		Continental		Total	
Club	Season	Division	Apps	Goals	Apps	Goals	Apps	Goals	Apps	Goals
Željezničar	2017–18	Bosnian Premier League	1	0	0	0	0	0	1	0
Bosna Visoko	2018–19	First League of FBiH	26	0	1	0	—		27	0
Orašje	2019–20	First League of FBiH	14	0	1	0	—		15	0
Goražde	2019–20	First League of FBiH	0	0	—		—		0	0
Goražde	2020–21	First League of FBiH	14	0	2	0	—		16	0
Goražde	Total		14	0	2	0	—		16	0
Career total			55	0	4	0	0	0	59	0

== Honours ==
Željezničar

- Bosnian Cup: 2017–18
