= Anel Šabanadžović =

Bosnian footballer (born 1999)

Personal information
- Full name: Anel Šabanadžović
- Date of birth: 24 May 1999 (age 27)
- Place of birth: Jackson, Missouri, United States
- Height: 1.82 m (6 ft 0 in)
- Position: Midfielder

Team information
- Current team: Ballkani
- Number: 5

Youth career
- 2007–2017: Željezničar

Senior career*
Years	Team	Apps	(Gls)
2017–2019	Željezničar	42	(0)
2019–2021	AEK Athens	13	(0)
2021	→ Željezničar (loan)	2	(0)
2021–2024	AEK Athens B	27	(0)
2024–2025	Omonia 29M	19	(1)
2026–	Ballkani	6	(1)

International career^{‡}
2015–2016	Bosnia and Herzegovina U17	6	(0)
2017–2018	Bosnia and Herzegovina U19	6	(0)
2018–2019	Bosnia and Herzegovina U21	2	(0)
- * Club domestic league appearances and goals as of 22 June 2025 ‡ National team caps and goals as of 26 March 2019

Anel Šabanadžović (Bosnian pronunciation: [ǎnel ʃǎbanaːdʒoʋitɕ]; born 24 May 1999) is a professional footballer who plays as a midfielder for Kosovo Superleague club Ballkani.

Šabanadžović began his career with Željezničar, where he progressed through the youth academy before making his senior debut in 2017. After two seasons with the club, he joined Greek side AEK Athens in 2019. During his time there, he made limited appearances for the first team and also featured for AEK Athens B. In 2021, he returned on loan to Željezničar for a short spell. Following his departure from AEK, he signed with Cypriot club Omonia 29M in 2024, where he spent one season. In 2026, he joined Kosovo Superleague side Ballkani.

Born in the United States and raised in Bosnia and Herzegovina, Šabanadžović represented Bosnia and Herzegovina at various youth levels, including the under-17, under-19, and under-21 teams.

== Club career ==
=== Željezničar ===
Šabanadžović came through Željezničar's youth academy, which he joined in 2007. He made his professional debut in a cup game against Goražde on 26 October 2016 at the age of 17 and managed to score a goal. On 24 July 2017, he made his league debut against GOŠK. Šabanadžović won his first trophy with the club on 9 May 2018, by beating Krupa in Bosnian Cup final.

=== AEK Athens ===
In January 2019, Greek side AEK Athens announced that Šabanadžović would join them the following season on a five-year contract. He made his competitive debut for the club in a triumph over Panionios on 7 December.

In March 2021, he was loaned to his former club Željezničar until the end of season.

== International career ==
Šabanadžović was born in Jackson, Missouri, United States and raised in Sarajevo, Bosnia and Herzegovina. He is the son of former Yugoslavia international Refik Šabanadžović, and he was eligible to represent three countries at international level, either Bosnia and Herzegovina (through residency and his mother), Montenegro (through his father), and United States (by birth).

From 2011 to 2019, Šabanadžović represented Bosnia and Herzegovina at youth international level, featuring for the U17, U19, and U21 teams, for which he made a total of fourteen appearances. In March 2020, Šabanadžović received his first senior call-up from Bosnia and Herzegovina for the UEFA Euro 2020 qualifying play-off against Northern Ireland, but he remained an unused substitute in that match.

== Career statistics ==
=== Club ===
As of match played 21 March 2021

Appearances and goals by club, season and competition
Club	Season	League			National cup (Note: Includes Bosnian Cup, Greek Cup)		Continental		Total	
Club	Season	Division	Apps	Goals	Apps	Goals	Apps	Goals	Apps	Goals
Željezničar	2016–17	Bosnian Premier League	0	0	1	1	–		1	1
Željezničar	2017–18	Bosnian Premier League	17	0	5	1	0	0	22	1
Željezničar	2018–19	Bosnian Premier League	25	0	1	0	4	1	30	1
Željezničar	Total		42	0	7	2	4	1	53	3
AEK Athens	2019–20	Super League Greece	11	0	2	0	0	0	13	0
AEK Athens	2020–21	Super League Greece	2	0	0	0	2	0	4	0
AEK Athens	Total		13	0	2	0	2	0	17	0
Željezničar (loan)	2020–21	Bosnian Premier League	2	0	1	0	–		3	0
Career total			57	0	10	2	6	1	73	3

== Honours ==
Željezničar

- Bosnian Cup: 2017–18
