= Andrej Modić =

Bosnian footballer (born 1996)

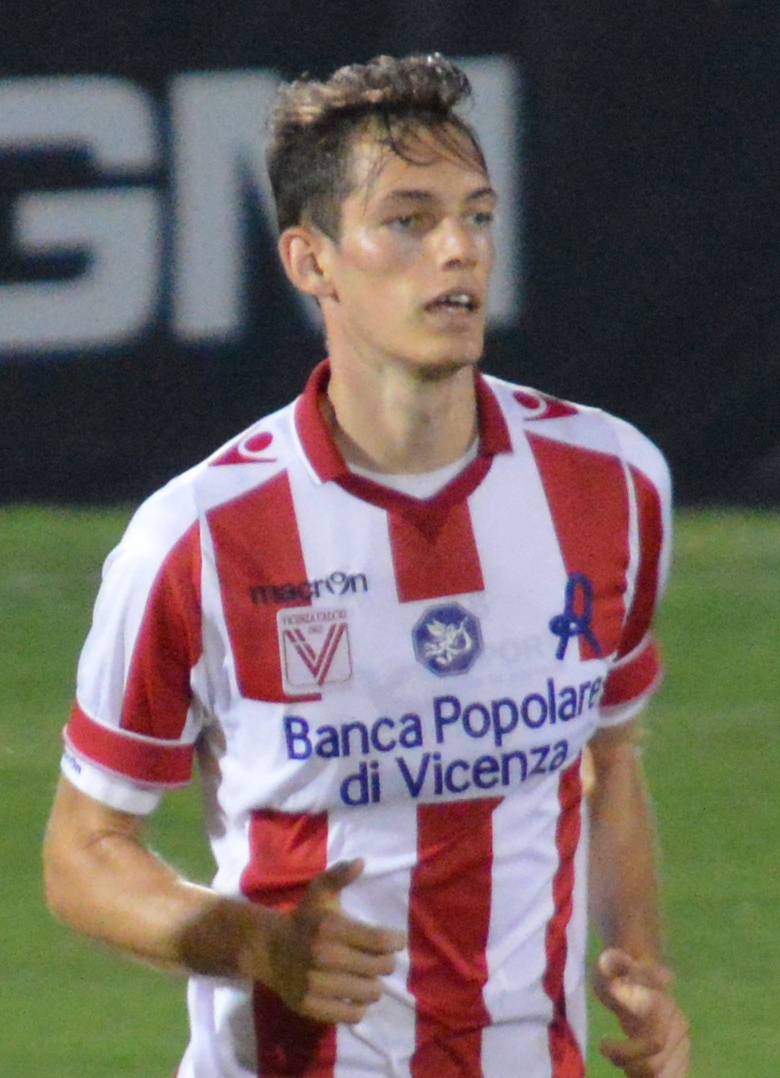
- Modić playing for Vicenza in 2015

Personal information
- Full name: Andrej Modić
- Date of birth: 7 March 1996 (age 30)
- Place of birth: Banja Luka, Bosnia and Herzegovina
- Height: 1.79 m (5 ft 10 1/2 in)
- Position: Midfielder

Youth career
- 2010–2015: AC Milan

Senior career*
Years	Team	Apps	(Gls)
2015–2018	AC Milan	0	(0)
2015–2016	→ Vicenza (loan)	12	(0)
2016–2017	→ Brescia (loan)	3	(0)
2017–2018	→ Rende (loan)	5	(0)
2018	Željezničar Sarajevo	1	(0)
2018–2020	Krupa	7	(0)
2020	Afragolese 1944	2	(0)
2021	Real Giulianova	9	(0)
2021–2023	Mladost Kotor Varoš		
2023–2024	Kozara Gradiška	15	(1)

International career
2013–2015	Bosnia and Herzegovina U19	9	(0)
2014–2015	Bosnia and Herzegovina U21	4	(0)
- * Club domestic league appearances and goals as of 19 October 2019

Andrej Modić (born 7 March 1996) is a Bosnian professional footballer who is a midfielder.

== Club career ==
Modić is a product of the AC Milan youth academy, where he was described by CEO Adriano Galliani as "one of the most talented players of his generation". He was signed by Vicenza on a one-year loan on 5 August 2015. Modić made his Serie B and professional debut on 26 September 2015, against Pescara. On 15 July 2016, he moved on loan to Brescia. On 31 August 2017, he was loaned out to Rende.

On 26 January 2018, he signed a three-and-a-half-year contract with Bosnian Premier League club Željezničar. On 25 June 2018, Modić left Željezničar after making only one league appearance. On 31 August 2018, he signed with Krupa. He left Krupa in the winter transfer window of the 2019–20 season. He joined Serie D side Afragolese in August 2020 but was released in the winter en was snapped up by Giulianova in February 2021.

== International career ==
Modić represented both the Bosnia and Herzegovina U19 and U21 national teams.

== Career statistics ==
=== Club ===
As of match played 19 October 2019.

Club	League	Season	League		Cup		Continental		Other		Total	
Club	League	Season	Apps	Goals	Apps	Goals	Apps	Goals	Apps	Goals	Apps	Goals
Vicenza (loan)	Serie B	2015–16	12	0	1	0	—		—		13	0
Brescia (loan)	Serie B	2016–17	3	0	1	0	—		—		4	0
Rende (loan)	Lega Pro	2017–18	5	0	1	0	—		—		6	0
Željezničar	Bosnian Premier League	2017–18	1	0	1	0	—		—		2	0
Krupa	Bosnian Premier League	2018–19	5	0	2	0	—		—		7	0
Krupa	First League of RS	2019–20	2	0	1	0	—		—		3	0
Krupa	Total		7	0	3	0	—		—		10	0
Career total			28	0	7	0	—		—		35	0

== Honours ==
Željezničar

- Bosnian Cup: 2017–18
