= Krajinović =

Krajinović (Serbian Cyrillic: Крајиновић, pronounced [krajǐːnoʋitɕ]) is a Serbian and Croatian surname. Notable people with the surname include:

- Filip Krajinović (born 1992), Serbian tennis player
- Nikola Krajinović (born 1999), Croatian footballer
