= Siniša Stevanović =

Serbian footballer

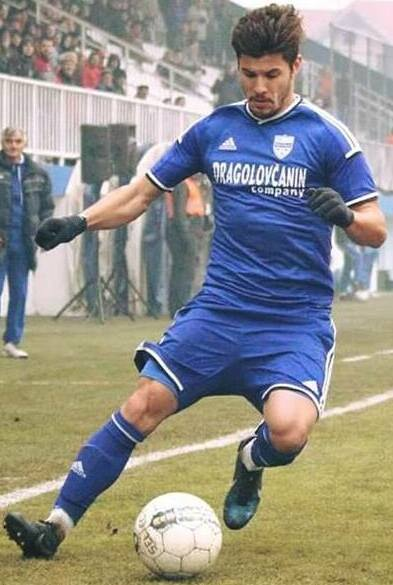
- Stevanović playing for Novi Pazar in 2015

Personal information
- Full name: Siniša Stevanović
- Date of birth: 12 January 1989 (age 37)
- Place of birth: Belgrade, SFR Yugoslavia
- Height: 1.76 m (5 ft 9 in)
- Position: Right-back

Team information
- Current team: Slavija Sarajevo

Youth career
- 2004–2007: Partizan

Senior career*
| Years | Team | Apps | (Gls) |
| 2007–2009 | Teleoptik | 26 | (0) |
| 2009–2010 | Partizan | 11 | (0) |
| 2010 | → Spartak Subotica (loan) | 15 | (0) |
| 2010–2013 | Spartak Subotica | 49 | (1) |
| 2014–2016 | Novi Pazar | 32 | (0) |
| 2016–2021 | Željezničar | 116 | (1) |
| 2021–2025 | Mornar | 111 | (1) |
| 2025– | Slavija | 0 | (0) |

International career
| 2009–2010 | Serbia U21 | 10 | (0) |
- * Club domestic league appearances and goals as of 1 June 2025

Siniša Stevanović (Serbian Cyrillic: Синиша Стевановић; born 12 January 1989) is a Serbian professional footballer who plays as a right-back for Bosnian second-tier club Slavija Sarajevo.

== Club career ==
A product of Partizan's youth system, Stevanović made his senior team debut with their affiliated club Teleoptik, before being promoted to Partizan's first team in the summer of 2009. He was loaned to Spartak Subotica in January 2010, before signing a permanent contract with the club in the summer of 2010.

In January 2014, Stevanović moved to another Superliga club Novi Pazar.

In the 2016 winter transfer window, Stevanović left Novi Pazar and moved to Bosnian Premier League club Željezničar. He won his first trophy with Željezničar in the 2017–18 season, the Bosnian Cup. On 27 July 2019, in an away win against Mladost Doboj Kakanj, he made his 100th appearance for the club. Stevanović scored his first goal for Željezničar on 9 November 2020, in a league game against Borac Banja Luka. In June 2021, he decided to terminate his contract with the club, leaving Željezničar after five years.

On 27 June 2021, Stevanović joined Montenegrin First League side Mornar.

== International career ==
Between 2009 and 2010, Stevanović represented Serbia at under-21 level, making nine appearances.

== Career statistics ==
=== Club ===
As of match played 3 June 2023.

Appearances and goals by club, season and competition
| Club | Season | League | League | | Cup | | Continental | | Other | | Total | |
| Club | Season | League | Apps | Goals | Apps | Goals | Apps | Goals | Apps | Goals | Apps | Goals |
|---|---|---|---|---|---|---|---|---|---|---|---|---|
| Partizan | 2009–10 | Serbian SuperLiga | 11 | 0 | 2 | 0 | 8 | 0 | – | | 21 | 0 |
| Spartak Subotica | 2009–10 | Serbian SuperLiga | 15 | 0 | 0 | 0 | – | | – | | 15 | 0 |
| Spartak Subotica | 2010–11 | Serbian SuperLiga | 24 | 0 | 3 | 0 | 3 | 0 | – | | 30 | 0 |
| Spartak Subotica | 2011–12 | Serbian SuperLiga | 16 | 1 | 2 | 0 | – | | – | | 18 | 1 |
| Spartak Subotica | 2012–13 | Serbian SuperLiga | 2 | 0 | 0 | 0 | – | | – | | 2 | 0 |
| Spartak Subotica | 2013–14 | Serbian SuperLiga | 7 | 0 | 0 | 0 | – | | – | | 7 | 0 |
| Spartak Subotica | Total | | 64 | 1 | 5 | 0 | 3 | 0 | – | | 72 | 1 |
| Novi Pazar | 2013–14 | Serbian SuperLiga | 5 | 0 | 0 | 0 | – | | – | | 5 | 0 |
| Novi Pazar | 2014–15 | Serbian SuperLiga | 11 | 0 | 0 | 0 | – | | – | | 11 | 0 |
| Novi Pazar | 2015–16 | Serbian SuperLiga | 16 | 0 | 1 | 0 | – | | – | | 17 | 0 |
| Novi Pazar | Total | | 32 | 0 | 1 | 0 | – | | – | | 33 | 0 |
| Željezničar | 2015–16 | Bosnian Premier League | 10 | 0 | 4 | 0 | – | | – | | 14 | 0 |
| Željezničar | 2016–17 | Bosnian Premier League | 26 | 0 | 5 | 0 | – | | – | | 31 | 0 |
| Željezničar | 2017–18 | Bosnian Premier League | 19 | 0 | 3 | 0 | 4 | 0 | – | | 26 | 0 |
| Željezničar | 2018–19 | Bosnian Premier League | 23 | 0 | 1 | 0 | 3 | 0 | – | | 27 | 0 |
| Željezničar | 2019–20 | Bosnian Premier League | 18 | 0 | 3 | 0 | – | | – | | 21 | 0 |
| Željezničar | 2020–21 | Bosnian Premier League | 20 | 1 | 3 | 0 | 1 | 0 | – | | 24 | 1 |
| Željezničar | Total | | 116 | 1 | 19 | 0 | 8 | 0 | – | | 143 | 1 |
| Mornar | 2021–22 | Montenegrin First League | 23 | 0 | 0 | 0 | – | | – | | 23 | 0 |
| Mornar | 2022–23 | Montenegrin First League | 30 | 0 | 1 | 0 | – | | 2 (Note: Appearances in 2022–23 Montenegrin First League play-offs) | 0 | 33 | 0 |
| Mornar | Total | | 53 | 0 | 1 | 0 | – | | 2 | 0 | 56 | 0 |
| Career total | | | 276 | 2 | 28 | 0 | 19 | 0 | 2 | 0 | 325 | 2 |

== Honours ==
Željezničar

- Bosnian Cup: 2017–18
