= Jusufi =

Jusufi (derived from the Arabic Yusuf) is an Albanian surname that may refer to the following notable people:

- Alban Jusufi (born 1981), Albanian footballer
- Fahrudin Jusufi (1939–2019), Serbian footballer
- Meldin Jusufi (born 1998) Bosnian footballer
- Pëllumb Jusufi (born 1988), Albanian footballer
- Rexhep Jusufi (died 1943), Albanian soldier of the Balli Kombëtar movement
- Sascha Jusufi (born 1963), Serbian footballer
