= Adi Mehremić =

Bosnian footballer (born 1992)

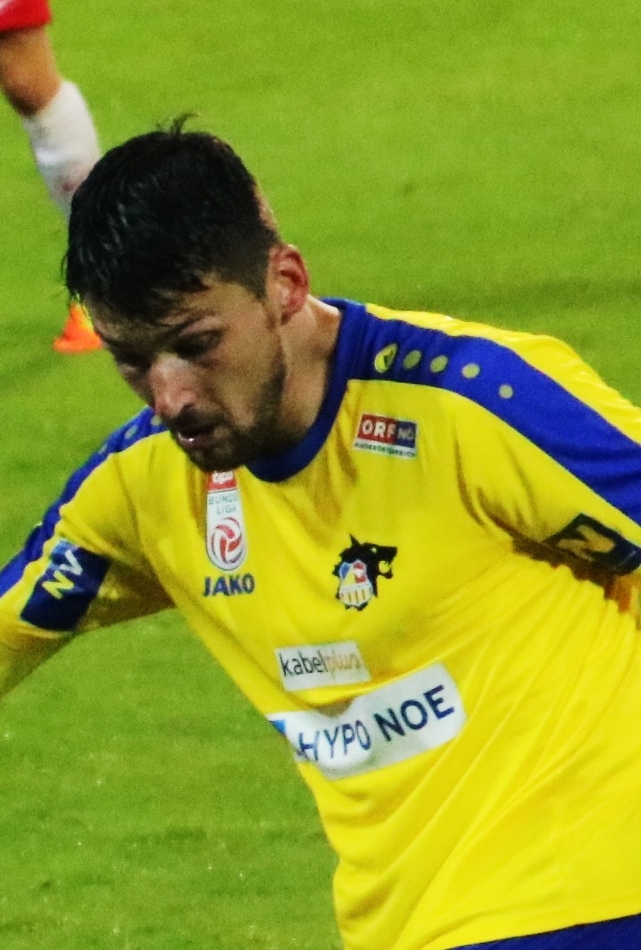
- Mehremić (right) playing for St. Pölten in 2017

Personal information
- Date of birth: 26 April 1992 (age 34)
- Place of birth: Sarajevo, Bosnia and Herzegovina
- Height: 1.89 m (6 ft 2 in)
- Position: Centre-back

Team information
- Current team: ASKÖ Oedt
- Number: 4

Senior career*
Years	Team	Apps	(Gls)
2010–2011	Radnik Hadžići		
2011–2013	Velež Mostar	20	(0)
2013	Olimpik	3	(0)
2013–2014	Ružomberok	4	(0)
2014–2015	Spartaks Jūrmala	15	(0)
2015–2016	Frýdek-Místek	22	(4)
2016	Senica	13	(0)
2016–2017	Spartak Myjava	11	(0)
2017–2018	St. Pölten	14	(0)
2018	Željezničar	12	(0)
2018–2019	Karpaty Lviv	23	(1)
2019–2020	Aves	8	(1)
2020–2022	Wisła Kraków	17	(1)
2022	→ Maccabi Petah Tikva (loan)	12	(0)
2022–2023	İstanbulspor	15	(1)
2023–2024	Sabail	31	(1)
2024–2025	Velež Mostar	11	(0)
2025	Stal Stalowa Wola	10	(0)
2025–	ASKÖ Oedt	28	(2)
- * Club domestic league appearances and goals as of 27 June 2026

Adi Mehremić (born 26 April 1992) is a Bosnian professional footballer who plays as a centre-back for Austrian club ASKÖ Oedt.

== Club career ==
Mehremić started his career playing with Radnik Hadžići, Velež Mostar and Olimpik.

On 27 September 2013, he signed a half-year contract with option to buy with Slovak club Ružomberok.

In March 2014, Mehremić joined Latvian Higher League club Spartaks Jūrmala on a one-year contract.

In January 2015, he signed a one-year deal with Czech National Football League club Frýdek-Místek. After Frýdek-Místek, Mehremić played for Senica, Spartak Myjava, St. Pölten and Željezničar with whom he won the 2017–18 Bosnian cup.

In July 2018, he joined Ukrainian Premier League club Karpaty Lviv. After one season at Karpaty, Mehremić left the club and shortly after, on 6 July 2019, signed a three-year contract with Portuguese Primeira Liga club Aves. He made his official debut for Aves on 11 August 2019, in a 1–0 away league loss against Boavista.

On 6 July 2019, he joined Portuguese club CD Aves, where he made 8 appearances and scored one goal in Primeira Liga. Ahead of the 2020–21 season, he signed a one-year contract with Wisła Kraków, which he extended on 30 May 2021. On 20 January 2022, he was loaned until the end of the season to Israeli club Maccabi Petah Tikva, with an option to purchase. Maccabi failed to remain in the league, and the player returned to Kraków. On 26 August 2022, he was transferred to Turkish club İstanbulspor. In the 2023–24 period, he represented Sabail, while from 2024 to early 2025, he played for Velež Mostar.

On 6 January 2025, he returned to Poland, joining second tier club Stal Stalowa Wola on a six-month contract. He made 10 appearances for Stal before leaving the club by mutual consent on 19 May 2025.

In July 2025, Mehremić signed with Austrian side ASKÖ Oedt.

== Honours ==
Željezničar

- Bosnian Cup: 2017–18
