= Daniel Graovac =

Bosnian footballer (born 1993)

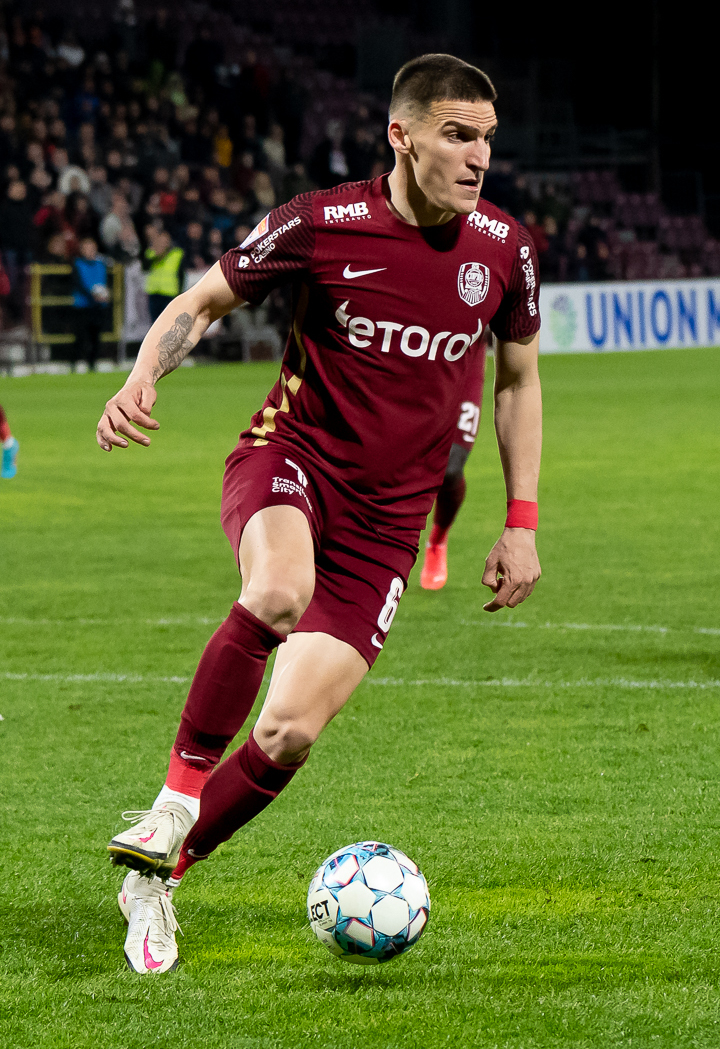
- Graovac with CFR Cluj in 2022

Personal information
- Date of birth: 8 August 1993 (age 33)
- Place of birth: Novi Grad, Bosnia and Herzegovina
- Height: 1.86 m (6 ft 1 in)
- Position: Defender

Team information
- Current team: Rapid București
- Number: 3

Youth career
- 2005–2009: Sloboda Novi Grad
- 2009–2013: Dinamo Zagreb

Senior career*
Years	Team	Apps	(Gls)
2013–2016	Zrinjski Mostar	82	(1)
2016–2018	Mouscron	2	(0)
2017	→ Zrinjski Mostar (loan)	6	(0)
2017–2018	→ Željezničar (loan)	28	(2)
2018–2019	Vojvodina	31	(0)
2019–2021	Astra Giurgiu	70	(1)
2021–2022	CFR Cluj	31	(1)
2022–2023	Kasımpaşa	14	(0)
2023–2024	Manisa	27	(0)
2024–2025	CFR Cluj	17	(0)
2025–2026	FCSB	20	(0)
2026–	Rapid București	5	(0)

International career
2009–2010	Bosnia and Herzegovina U17	8	(0)
2011–2012	Bosnia and Herzegovina U19	6	(1)
2013–2014	Bosnia and Herzegovina U21	8	(0)
2016–2018	Bosnia and Herzegovina	3	(0)
- * Club domestic league appearances and goals as of 21 August 2026

Daniel Graovac (Bosnian pronunciation: [dǎniel ɡrâoʋats]; born 8 August 1993) is a Bosnian professional footballer who plays as a defender for Liga I club Rapid București.

== Club career ==
He started out at Zrinjski Mostar in 2013, and went on to compete professionally in Belgium, Serbia, Romania and Turkey.

== International career ==
Graovac made his first international appearance for Bosnia and Herzegovina in a friendly game against Luxembourg on 25 March 2016, having substituted Sanjin Prcić in the 77th minute. He made his official senior debut for them in a March 2016 friendly match away against Switzerland and has earned a total of 3 caps, scoring no goals. His last international was a January 2018 friendly against Mexico.

== Career statistics ==
=== Club ===
As of match played 21 August 2026

Appearances and goals by club, season and competition
Club	Season	League			National cup (Note: Includes Bosnia and Herzegovina Cup, Serbian Cup, Cupa României, Turkish Cup)		Europe		Other		Total	
Club	Season	Division	Apps	Goals	Apps	Goals	Apps	Goals	Apps	Goals	Apps	Goals
Zrinjski Mostar	2012–13	Bosnian Premier League	14	0	1	0	—		—		15	0
Zrinjski Mostar	2013–14	Bosnian Premier League	11	0	3	0	1 (Note: Appearance(s) in UEFA Europa League)	0	—		15	0
Zrinjski Mostar	2014–15	Bosnian Premier League	28	0	4	0	2 (Note: Appearances in UEFA Champions League)	0	—		34	0
Zrinjski Mostar	2015–16	Bosnian Premier League	24	1	0	0	2	0	—		26	1
Zrinjski Mostar	2016–17	Bosnian Premier League	5	0	—		0	0	—		5	0
Zrinjski Mostar	Total		82	1	8	0	5	0	0	0	95	1
Mouscron	2016–17	Belgian First Division A	2	0	0	0	—		—		2	0
Zrinjski Mostar (loan)	2016–17	Bosnian Premier League	6	0	0	0	—		—		6	0
Željezničar (loan)	2017–18	Bosnian Premier League	28	2	6	1	4	0	—		38	3
Vojvodina	2018–19	Serbian SuperLiga	31	0	1	0	—		—		32	0
Astra Giurgiu	2019–20	Liga I	32	0	2	0	—		—		34	0
Astra Giurgiu	2020–21	Liga I	38	1	4	0	—		—		42	1
Astra Giurgiu	Total		70	1	6	0	—		0	0	76	1
CFR Cluj	2021–22	Liga I	29	1	1	0	6 (Note: Two appearances in UEFA Champions League, one appearance in UEFA Europa League, three appearances in UEFA Europa Conference League)	0	1 (Note: Appearance in Supercupa României)	0	37	1
CFR Cluj	2022–23	Liga I	2	0	0	0	2 (Note: Appearances in UEFA Europa Conference League)	0	1	0	5	0
CFR Cluj	Total		31	1	1	0	8	0	2	0	42	1
Kasımpaşa	2022–23	Süper Lig	14	0	2	0	—		—		16	0
Manisa	2023–24	TFF 1. Lig	27	0	1	0	—		—		28	0
CFR Cluj	2024–25	Liga I	17	0	6	1	0	0	—		23	1
FCSB	2025–26	Liga I	20	0	1	0	9 (Note: One appearance in UEFA Champions League, eight appearances and one goal in UEFA Europa League)	1	0	0	30	1
Rapid București	2026–27	Liga I	5	0	0	0	—		—		5	0
Career total			333	5	37	2	26	1	2	0	398	9

=== International ===
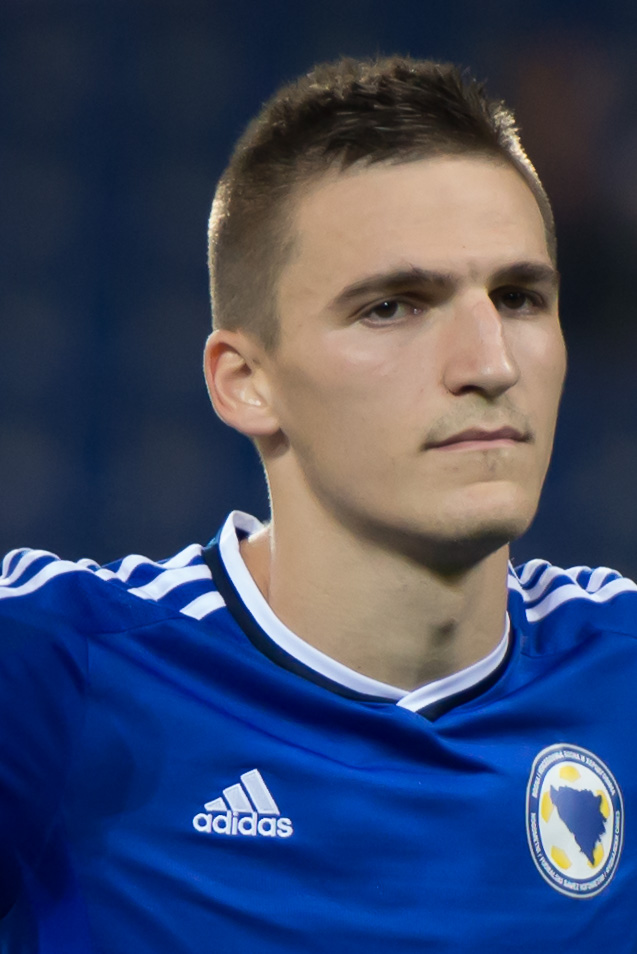
Graovac with Bosnia and Herzegovina U21 in 2014

As of match played 1 February 2018.

National team	Year	Apps	Goals
Bosnia and Herzegovina
Bosnia and Herzegovina	2016	1	0
Bosnia and Herzegovina	2017	0	0
Bosnia and Herzegovina	2018	2	0
Total		3	0

== Honours ==
Zrinjski Mostar

- Premijer Liga: 2013–14, 2015–16, 2016–17

Željezničar

- Bosnian Cup: 2017–18

Astra Giurgiu

- Cupa României runner-up: 2020–21

CFR Cluj

- Liga I: 2021–22
- Cupa României: 2024–25
- Supercupa României runner-up: 2021, 2022

FCSB

- Supercupa României: 2025

Individual

- Bosnian Premier League Team of the Season: 2017–18
