= Asim Zec =

Bosnian professional footballer (born 1994)

Personal information
- Full name: Asim Zec
- Date of birth: 23 January 1994 (age 32)
- Place of birth: Bugojno, Bosnia and Herzegovina
- Height: 1.76 m (5 ft 9 in)
- Position: Right winger

Team information
- Current team: NK Travnik
- Number: 8

Youth career
- –2010: Iskra Bugojno

Senior career*
Years	Team	Apps	(Gls)
2010–2012	Iskra Bugojno		
2012–2014	Hradec Králové	8	(0)
2014–2015	Olimpik	9	(4)
2015	Čelik Zenica	9	(1)
2015–2016	Velež Mostar	13	(1)
2016	Travnik	10	(5)
2016–2017	Sloboda Tuzla	27	(9)
2017–2020	Željezničar	59	(11)
2020	Zrinjski Mostar	5	(1)
2020–2021	Željezničar	4	(0)
2021–2022	Leotar	14	(4)
2022	Igman	5	(0)
2022–	Travnik	13	(6)

International career
2012–2013	Bosnia and Herzegovina U19	4	(1)
2016	Bosnia and Herzegovina U21	2	(0)
- * Club domestic league appearances and goals as of 2 December 2020

Asim Zec (born 23 January 1994) is a Bosnian professional footballer who plays as a right winger for NK Travnik.

== Club career ==
Zec joined Hradec Králové from Iskra Bugojno in July 2012. He twice managed to score four goals in one game for the youth team of Hradec Králové in his debut season. He returned to Bosnia and Herzegovina in February 2014 to play for Olimpik. After Olimpik, Zec also played for Čelik Zenica, Velež Mostar, Travnik and Sloboda Tuzla.

In June 2017, he signed a contract with Željezničar. In May 2018, Zec won the 2017–18 Bosnian Cup with Željezničar. He left Željezničar on 6 February 2020, terminating his contract with the club. Four days after leaving Željezničar, on 10 February, Zec signed a one-and-a-half-year contract with Zrinjski Mostar. He made his official debut and scored his first official goal for Zrinjski in a 2–0 league win against his former club Čelik on 23 February 2020. Zec left Zrinjski on 30 September 2020.

In October 2020, he returned to Željezničar. Zec played his first official game since his return to the club on 21 October 2020, in a cup game against Goražde. After his contract with Željezničar expired, on 15 January 2021, he left the club once again.

== International career ==
Zec made caps for the Bosnia and Herzegovina U19 and Bosnia and Herzegovina U21 national teams, even scoring one goal for the U19 team.

He played for the U19 team in the UEFA European U19 Championship qualification round.

== Personal life ==
Zec's older brother, Ermin, is also a professional footballer who played alongside him at Željezničar.

== Honours ==
Željezničar

- Bosnian Cup: 2017–18
