= Kenan Hadžić =

Croatian footballer (born 1994)

Personal information
- Date of birth: 7 May 1994 (age 32)
- Place of birth: Pula, Croatia
- Height: 1.83 m (6 ft 0 in)
- Position: Right-back

Youth career
- –2006: Vodnjan
- 2006–2007: Istra 1961
- 2007–2008: Vodnjan
- 2008–2012: Istra 1961
- 2013: → Rovinj (loan)

Senior career*
Years	Team	Apps	(Gls)
2013–2018	Istra 1961	39	(1)
2013	→ Rovinj (loan)	10	(0)
2013–2014	→ Rovinj (loan)	22	(0)
2014–2015	→ Istra 1961 B	14	(3)
2018	Željezničar Sarajevo	7	(0)
2019	Swift Hesperange	11	(0)
- * Club domestic league appearances and goals as of 13:29, 15 May 2019 (UTC)

Kenan Hadžić (born 7 May 1994) is a Croatian footballer who plays as a right-back.

== Career ==
Hadžić started training football at his local club in Vodnjan before moving on to the Istra 1961 academy in 2006 for the first time. He signed his first contract for the club at the beginning of 2013, before being loaned out to NK Rovinj, where he played at the same time for the third-tier senior and the second-tier U19 team.

Returning to Istra 1961 in the summer of 2013, he made his first-team debut in a 3–1 away loss against Dinamo Zagreb on 31 August 2013. He was, however, loaned out for a further season at NK Rovinj. During the 2014–15 season, he captained Istra 1961's reserve team.

Hadžić scored his first goal for Istra 1961 in a 1–0 home win against Slaven Belupo on 8 September 2017, ensuring his club's first win of the season. In January 2018 he left Istra.

On 22 January 2018, Hadžić signed with Premier League of Bosnia and Herzegovina club Željezničar Sarajevo. In May 2018, he won the 2017–18 Bosnian Cup with Željezničar. On 18 June 2018, Hadžić left Željezničar.

On 31 January 2019, Hadžić moved to Luxembourg and joined Swift Hesperange in the Luxembourg Division of Honour.

== Honours ==
Željezničar Sarajevo

- Bosnian Cup: 2017–18
