= Goran Zakarić =

Bosnian footballer (born 1992)

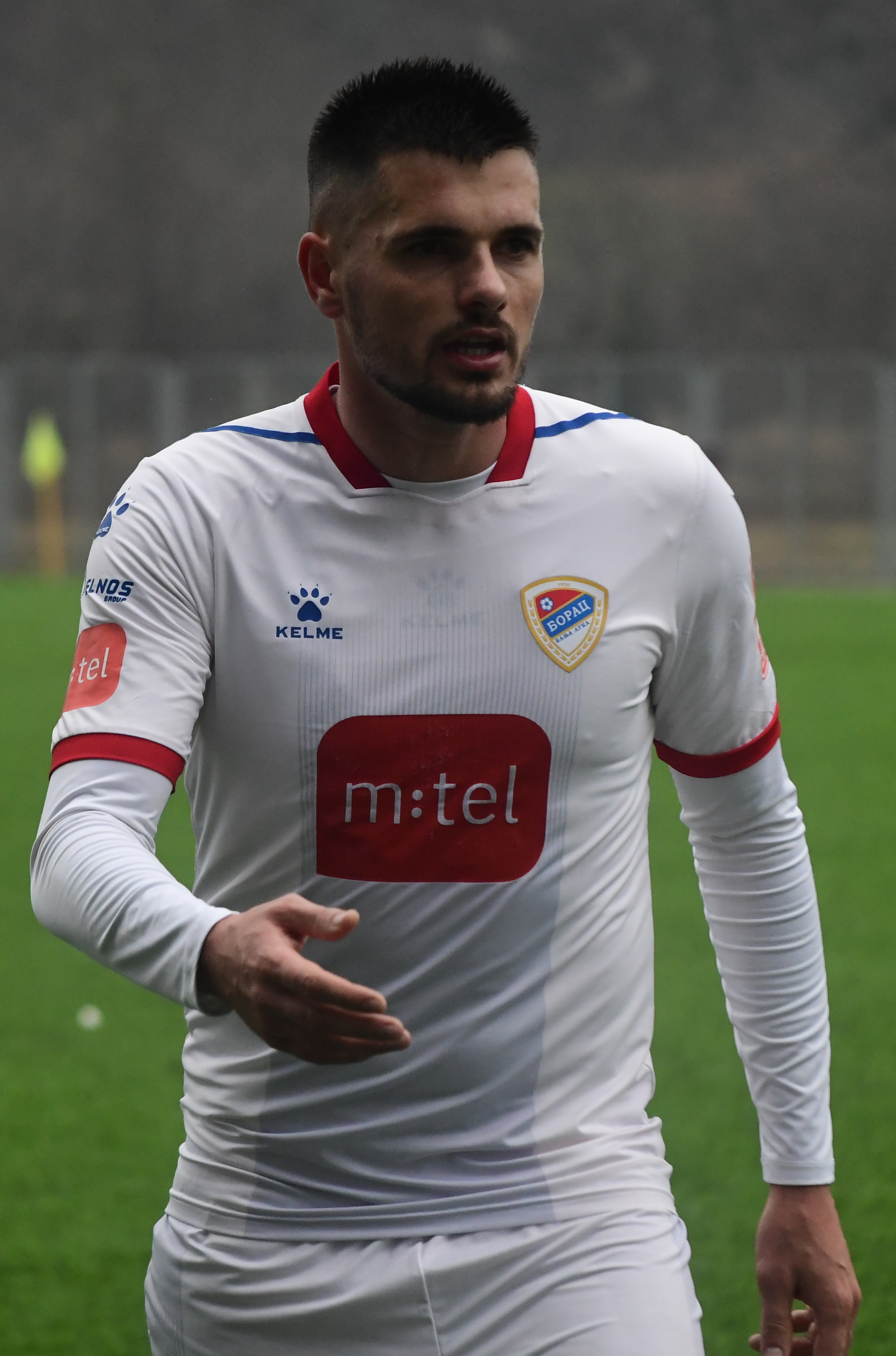
- Zakarić playing for Borac Banja Luka in 2020

Personal information
- Full name: Goran Zakarić
- Date of birth: 7 November 1992 (age 34)
- Place of birth: Gradiška, Bosnia and Herzegovina
- Height: 1.82 m (6 ft 0 in)
- Position: Winger

Team information
- Current team: Vardar
- Number: 10

Youth career
- 2001–2009: Kozara Gradiška

Senior career*
Years	Team	Apps	(Gls)
2009–2010	Kozara Gradiška		
2010–2011	Široki Brijeg	24	(5)
2011–2017	Dinamo Zagreb	0	(0)
2011–2012	→ Široki Brijeg (loan)	21	(4)
2012–2013	→ Lokomotiva (loan)	22	(0)
2013–2015	→ Široki Brijeg (loan)	56	(13)
2015–2016	→ Zrinjski Mostar (loan)	26	(7)
2016	→ Slaven Belupo (loan)	7	(0)
2017–2018	Željezničar	44	(14)
2018–2019	Partizan	29	(4)
2019–2020	Universitatea Craiova	10	(0)
2020–2022	Borac Banja Luka	51	(14)
2022	Ohod Medina		
2022	Borac Banja Luka	16	(1)
2023	Zadar	13	(13)
2023–2024	Aiolikos	28	(5)
2024–	Vardar	72	(29)

International career^{‡}
2010	Bosnia and Herzegovina U19	5	(0)
2011–2013	Bosnia and Herzegovina U21	13	(1)
2014–2019	Bosnia and Herzegovina	11	(0)
- * Club domestic league appearances and goals as of 4 November 2026 ‡ National team caps and goals as of 23 March 2019

Goran Zakarić (Serbian Cyrillic: Горан Закарић; born 7 November 1992) is a Bosnian professional footballer who plays as a winger for Macedonian First Football League club FK Vardar.

Zakarić started his professional career at Kozara Gradiška, before joining Široki Brijeg in 2010. The following year, he moved to Dinamo Zagreb. His spell with the club was marked by many loans, until he eventually settled at Željezničar in 2017. A year later, he switched to Partizan. One year after, he signed with Universitatea Craiova. The following year, he joined Borac Banja Luka. After parting ways with Borac Banja Luka, Zakarić has, in a surprise move, decided to join HNK Zadar, a club that competes in the fourth tier of the Croatian football pyramid.

A former youth international for Bosnia and Herzegovina, Zakarić made his senior international debut in 2014, earning 11 caps since.

== Club career ==
=== Early career ===
Zakarić started playing football at his hometown club Kozara Gradiška, whose youth setup he joined in 2001. He made his professional debut in 2009 at the age of 16.

In June 2010, he joined Široki Brijeg. On 31 July, he scored his first professional goal against Borac Banja Luka.

On 16 May 2011, he signed a seven-year contract with Croatian club Dinamo Zagreb. However, his spell with the team was marked by many loans, and he never got first-team opportunity.

=== Željezničar ===
In January 2017, Zakarić moved to Željezničar on a two-year deal. On 26 February, he debuted for the side in an away win over Krupa. He scored his first goal with Željezničar against Radnik Bijeljina on 18 March.

On 18 April 2018, he scored his first career hat-trick against Sloboda Tuzla.

Zakarić won his first trophy with the club on 9 May, by triumphing over Krupa in Bosnian Cup final. Later that month, Zakarić was voted as best player in the league for the past season.

=== Partizan ===
After lengthy negotiations, Zakarić was transferred to Serbian side Partizan for a fee of €150,000 in August 2018. He scored on his competitive debut for the team, in UEFA Europa League qualifier against Nordsjælland. On 12 August, he made his league debut in a victory over Zemun. In a game against Voždovac on 5 October, he scored a brace, which were his first league goals for Partizan. Zakarić won his first trophy with the club on 23 May 2019, by beating city rivals Red Star Belgrade in Serbian Cup final.

On 6 September 2019, Zakarić and Partizan agreed to rescind his contract.

=== Later career stage ===
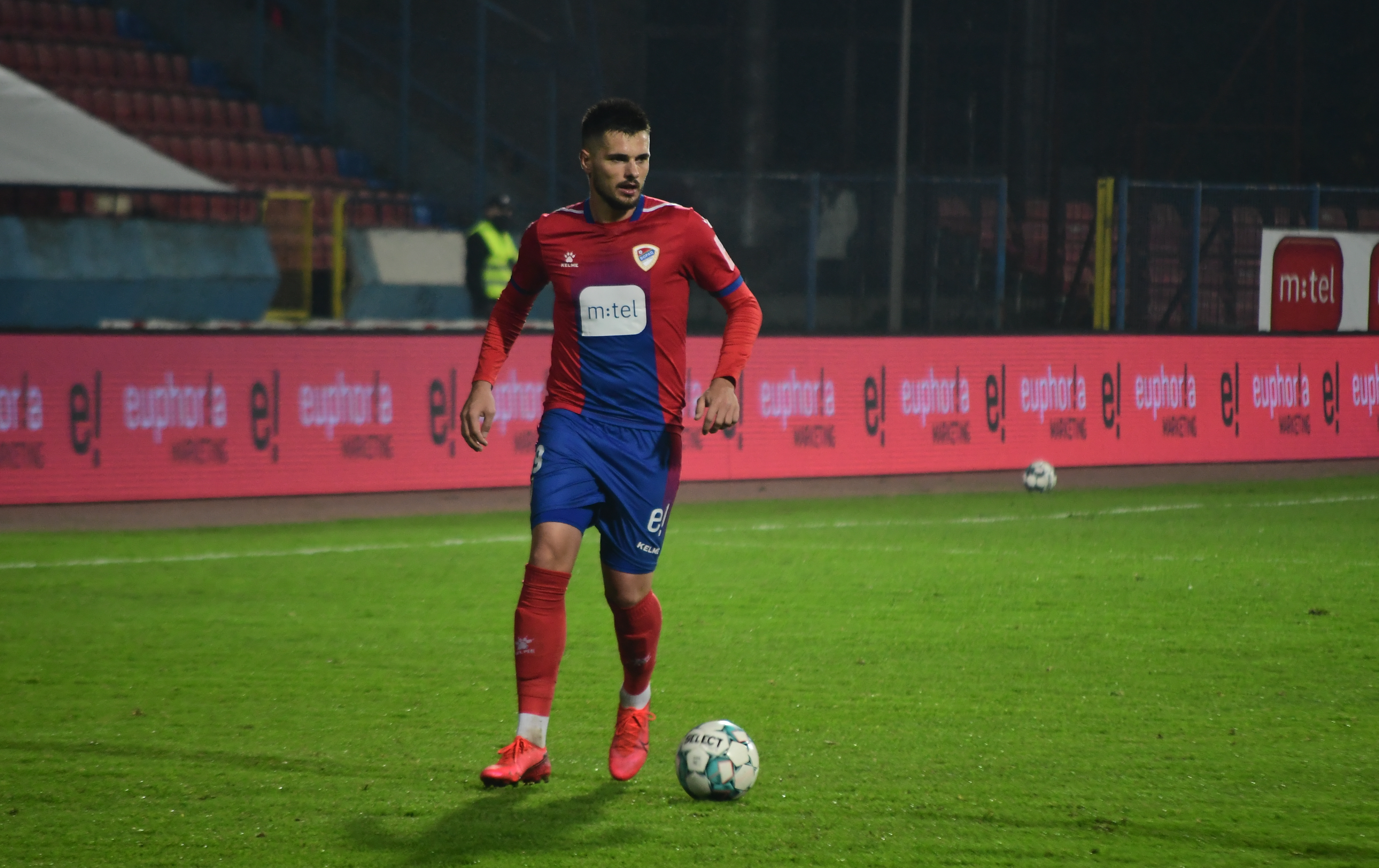
Zakarić playing for Borac Banja Luka in 2020

On 8 October 2019, Zakarić signed a four-year deal with Romanian outfit Universitatea Craiova.

In February 2020, he joined Borac Banja Luka on a one-year contract. On 6 August 2020, Zakarić extended his contract with Borac. He won his first trophy with Borac on 23 May 2021, getting crowned Bosnian Premier League champions one game before the end of the 2020–21 season.

On 27 January 2022, Zakarić joined Saudi Arabian club Ohod.

== International career ==
Zakarić represented Bosnia and Herzegovina on various youth levels.

In August 2014, he received his first senior call-up, for games against Liechtenstein and Cyprus. Zakarić debuted in convincing friendly triumph over former on 4 September.

== Personal life ==
Zakarić married his long-time girlfriend Tanja in July 2016. They have two daughters, Amber and Lana.

== Career statistics ==
=== Club ===
As of match played 29 August 2021.

Club	Season	League			Cup		Continental		Total	
Club	Season	Division	Apps	Goals	Apps	Goals	Apps	Goals	Apps	Goals
Široki Brijeg	2010–11	Bosnian Premier League	24	5	5	1	0	0	29	6
Široki Brijeg	2011–12 (loan)	Bosnian Premier League	21	4	7	0	2	0	30	4
Široki Brijeg	Total		45	9	12	1	2	0	59	10
Lokomotiva (loan)	2012–13	1. HNL	22	0	6	1	–		28	1
Široki Brijeg (loan)	2013–14	Bosnian Premier League	28	9	6	1	4	0	38	10
Široki Brijeg (loan)	2014–15	Bosnian Premier League	28	4	9	1	4	2	41	7
Široki Brijeg (loan)	Total		56	13	15	2	8	2	79	17
Zrinjski Mostar (loan)	2015–16	Bosnian Premier League	26	7	1	0	2	0	29	7
Slaven Belupo (loan)	2016–17	1. HNL	7	0	0	0	–		7	0
Željezničar	2016–17	Bosnian Premier League	14	2	3	0	–		17	2
Željezničar	2017–18	Bosnian Premier League	30	12	8	5	4	1	42	18
Željezničar	Total		44	14	11	5	4	1	59	20
Partizan	2018–19	Serbian SuperLiga	29	4	3	2	4	1	36	7
Universitatea Craiova	2019–20	Liga I	10	0	0	0	–		10	0
Borac Banja Luka	2019–20	Bosnian Premier League	3	1	1	0	–		4	1
Borac Banja Luka	2020–21	Bosnian Premier League	30	12	5	2	2	0	37	14
Borac Banja Luka	2021–22	Bosnian Premier League	18	1	0	0	4	0	22	1
Borac Banja Luka	Total		51	14	6	2	6	0	63	16
Borac Banja Luka	2022–23	Bosnian Premier League	16	1	0	0	1	0	17	1
Career total			306	62	54	13	27	4	387	79

=== International ===
As of match played 23 March 2019.

National team	Year	Apps	Goals
Bosnia and Herzegovina
Bosnia and Herzegovina	2014	1	0
Bosnia and Herzegovina	2015	0	0
Bosnia and Herzegovina	2016	0	0
Bosnia and Herzegovina	2017	0	0
Bosnia and Herzegovina	2018	9	0
Bosnia and Herzegovina	2019	1	0
Total		11	0

== Honours ==
Zrinjski Mostar

- Bosnian Premier League: 2015–16

Željezničar

- Bosnian Cup: 2017–18

Partizan

- Serbian Cup: 2018–19

Borac Banja Luka

- Bosnian Premier League: 2020–21

Vardar

- Macedonian First Football League: 2025–26
- Macedonian Football Cup: 2024–25

Individual

- Bosnian Premier League Player of the Season: 2017–18, 2020–21
