= Haris Hajdarević =

Bosnian footballer (born 1998)

Personal information
- Date of birth: 7 October 1998 (age 28)
- Place of birth: Sarajevo, Bosnia and Herzegovina
- Height: 1.81 m (5 ft 11 in)
- Position: Central midfielder

Team information
- Current team: Dinamo Samarkand
- Number: 30

Youth career
- –2017: Željezničar

Senior career*
Years	Team	Apps	(Gls)
2017–2021	Željezničar	66	(3)
2020	→ Sloboda Tuzla (loan)	3	(0)
2021	Boluspor	5	(0)
2021–2023	Željezničar	44	(0)
2023–2026	Radnik Surdulica	107	(12)
2026–	Dinamo Samarkand	2	(0)

International career
2019–2020	Bosnia and Herzegovina U21	5	(0)
- * Club domestic league appearances and goals as of 28 July 2026

Haris Hajdarević (born 7 October 1998) is a Bosnian professional footballer who plays as a central midfielder for Uzbekistan Super League club Dinamo Samarkand.

== Club career ==
Born in Sarajevo, Hajdarević started playing football at his hometown club Željezničar, who loaned him to Sloboda Tuzla in 2020. In January 2021, he left Željezničar and joined Turkish club Boluspor for an undisclosed transfer fee.

In August 2021, Hajdarević returned to Željezničar. He made his second debut for the club in a Sarajevo derby game against FK Sarajevo on 22 September 2021.

In July 2023, Hajdarević left Željezničar to join Serbian SuperLiga side Radnik Surdulica.

In July 2026, he joined to Dinamo Samarkand.

== International career ==
Hajdarević was a member of the Bosnia and Herzegovina national under-21 team.

== Honours ==
Željezničar

- Bosnian Cup: 2017–18
