= Josip Projić =

Serbian footballer

Personal information
- Full name: Josip Projić
- Date of birth: 23 August 1987 (age 39)
- Place of birth: Kruševac, SFR Yugoslavia
- Height: 1.78 m (5 ft 10 in)
- Position: Left-back

Youth career
- Jedinstvo Kruševac
- 2000–2004: Napredak Kruševac

Senior career*
Years	Team	Apps	(Gls)
2004–2008	Napredak Kruševac	82	(0)
2009	Volga Nizhny Novgorod	11	(0)
2010	Napredak Kruševac	25	(1)
2011–2013	Jagodina	58	(0)
2014	Voždovac	12	(0)
2014	Levadiakos	7	(0)
2015	Budapest Honvéd	1	(0)
2015–2017	Napredak Kruševac	40	(1)
2017–2018	Željezničar Sarajevo	15	(0)
2018	Napredak Kruševac	4	(0)
2019	Fakel Voronezh	10	(0)
2019–2020	Kolubara	13	(0)
2020–2021	Ethnikos Achna	7	(0)
2022–2023	Napredak Kruševac	8	(0)

International career
2005	Serbia and Montenegro U19 (Note: Only official UEFA matches included)	2	(0)
- * Club domestic league appearances and goals as of 10 May 2023

Josip Projić (Serbian Cyrillic: Јосип Пројић; born 23 August 1987) is a Serbian professional footballer who plays as a left back.

== Club career ==
A product of the Napredak Kruševac youth system, Projić played for the club in four different spells, amassing over 150 league appearances. He also spent three years with Jagodina, winning the Serbian Cup in 2013. In addition, Projić played abroad in four countries, winning the Bosnia and Herzegovina Cup with Željezničar Sarajevo in 2018.

== International career ==
Projić represented Serbia and Montenegro at under-19 level.

== Honours ==
Jagodina

- Serbian Cup: 2012–13

Napredak Kruševac

- Serbian First League: 2015–16

Željezničar Sarajevo

- Bosnia and Herzegovina Cup: 2017–18
