= Jovan Blagojević (footballer, born 1988) =

Serbian footballer

Personal information
- Date of birth: 15 March 1988 (age 38)
- Place of birth: Belgrade, SFR Yugoslavia
- Height: 1.75 m (5 ft 9 in)
- Position: Midfielder

Team information
- Current team: Prva Iskra Baric

Youth career
- –2012: Čukarički

Senior career*
Years	Team	Apps	(Gls)
2012	Čukarički	14	(0)
2012	Srem	7	(0)
2012–2013	Šumadija Jagnjilo		
2013–2014	Sinđelić Beograd	15	(3)
2014–2015	Velež Mostar	38	(3)
2015–2019	Željezničar	94	(5)
2019–2020	Osmanlıspor	33	(4)
2020	Altay	0	(0)
2021	Ankaraspor	14	(1)
2021–2022	Radnik Bijeljina	20	(3)
2022–2023	Velež Mostar	16	(0)
2024–	Prva Iskra Baric		
- * Club domestic league appearances and goals as of 19 July 2023

Jovan Blagojević (Serbian Cyrillic: Јован Благојевић; born 15 March 1988) is a Serbian professional footballer who plays as a midfielder for Bosnian Premier League club Velež Mostar.

== Honours ==
Željezničar

- Bosnian Cup: 2017–18
