= Denis Žerić =

Bosnian footballer

Personal information
- Full name: Denis Žerić
- Date of birth: 21 March 1998 (age 28)
- Place of birth: Sarajevo, Bosnia and Herzegovina
- Height: 1.83 m (6 ft 0 in)
- Position: Midfielder

Team information
- Current team: Rudar Kakanj

Youth career
- –2015: Željezničar

Senior career*
Years	Team	Apps	(Gls)
2015–2020	Željezničar	21	(1)
2018–2019	→ Igman Konjic (loan)	27	(1)
2019–2020	→ Goražde (loan)	14	(9)
2020	Sloboda Tuzla	3	(0)
2020–2021	Vis Simm-Bau	10	(2)
2022–	Rudar Kakanj	28	(4)
2024-	Mladost Kakanj	20	(0)

International career
2014	Bosnia and Herzegovina U17	3	(1)
2016–2017	Bosnia and Herzegovina U19	6	(1)
- * Club domestic league appearances and goals as of 15:02, 27 December 2022 (UTC)

Denis Žerić (born 21 March 1998) is a Bosnian professional footballer who plays as a midfielder for Mladost Kakanj, a club currently in the Second League of FBIH.

== Personal life ==
His father, Senad Žerić, was a Bosnian international footballer.

== Honours ==
Željezničar

- Bosnian Cup: 2017–18

== See also ==
- List of FK Željezničar Sarajevo players
