= Sinan Ramović =

Bosnian footballer

Personal information
- Full name: Sinan Ramović
- Date of birth: 13 October 1992 (age 34)
- Place of birth: Goražde, Bosnia and Herzegovina
- Height: 1.86 m (6 ft 1 in)
- Position: Midfielder

Youth career
- –2010: Radnik Hadžići

Senior career*
Years	Team	Apps	(Gls)
2010–2012	Goražde	21	(5)
2012–2013	GOŠK Gabela	26	(3)
2013–2014	Velež Mostar	15	(2)
2014–2015	Goražde	24	(6)
2015–2017	Mladost Doboj Kakanj	46	(5)
2017–2020	Željezničar	53	(5)
2020	Stade Lausanne Ouchy	15	(1)
2021	Željezničar	4	(0)
- * Club domestic league appearances and goals as of 18 April 2021

Sinan Ramović (born 13 October 1992) is a Bosnian professional footballer who plays as a midfielder. He most recently played for Bosnian Premier League club Željezničar.

== Personal life ==
Sinan is the cousin of popular Bosnian singer Džejla Ramović.

== Honours ==
Željezničar

- Bosnian Cup: 2017–18
