= Almir Ćubara =

Bosnian association football player

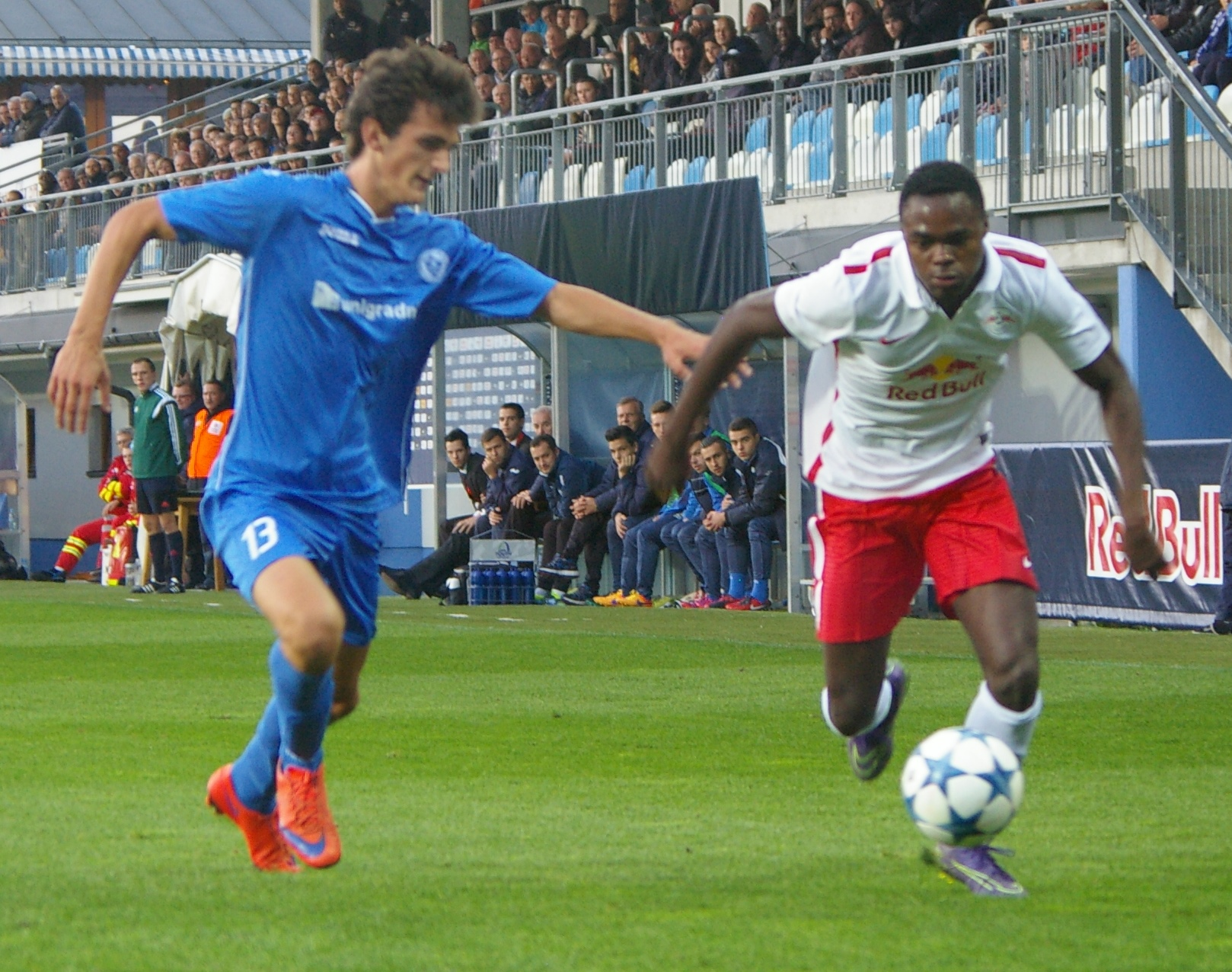

Personal information
- Full name: Almir Ćubara
- Date of birth: 21 November 1997 (age 28)
- Place of birth: Sarajevo, Bosnia and Herzegovina
- Position: Centre-back

Team information
- Current team: Tikvesh
- Number: 6

Youth career
- 2008–2014: Olimpik
- 2015–2016: Željezničar

Senior career*
Years	Team	Apps	(Gls)
2014	Olimpik	2	(0)
2016–2018	Bosna Visoko	35	(0)
2018–2019	Željezničar	1	(0)
2018–2019	→ Bosna Visoko (loan)	14	(0)
2019–2020	Čelik Zenica	19	(0)
2020–2021	TOŠK Tešanj	15	(1)
2021–2023	Igman Konjic	48	(5)
2023–	Tikvesh	39	(0)
- * Club domestic league appearances and goals as of 1 June 2025

Almir Ćubara (born 21 November 1997) is a Bosnian professional footballer who plays as a centre-back for GFK Tikvesh in the Macedonian First Football League.

== Honours ==
Željezničar

- Bosnian Cup: 2017–18
