= Vojo Ubiparip =

Serbian footballer

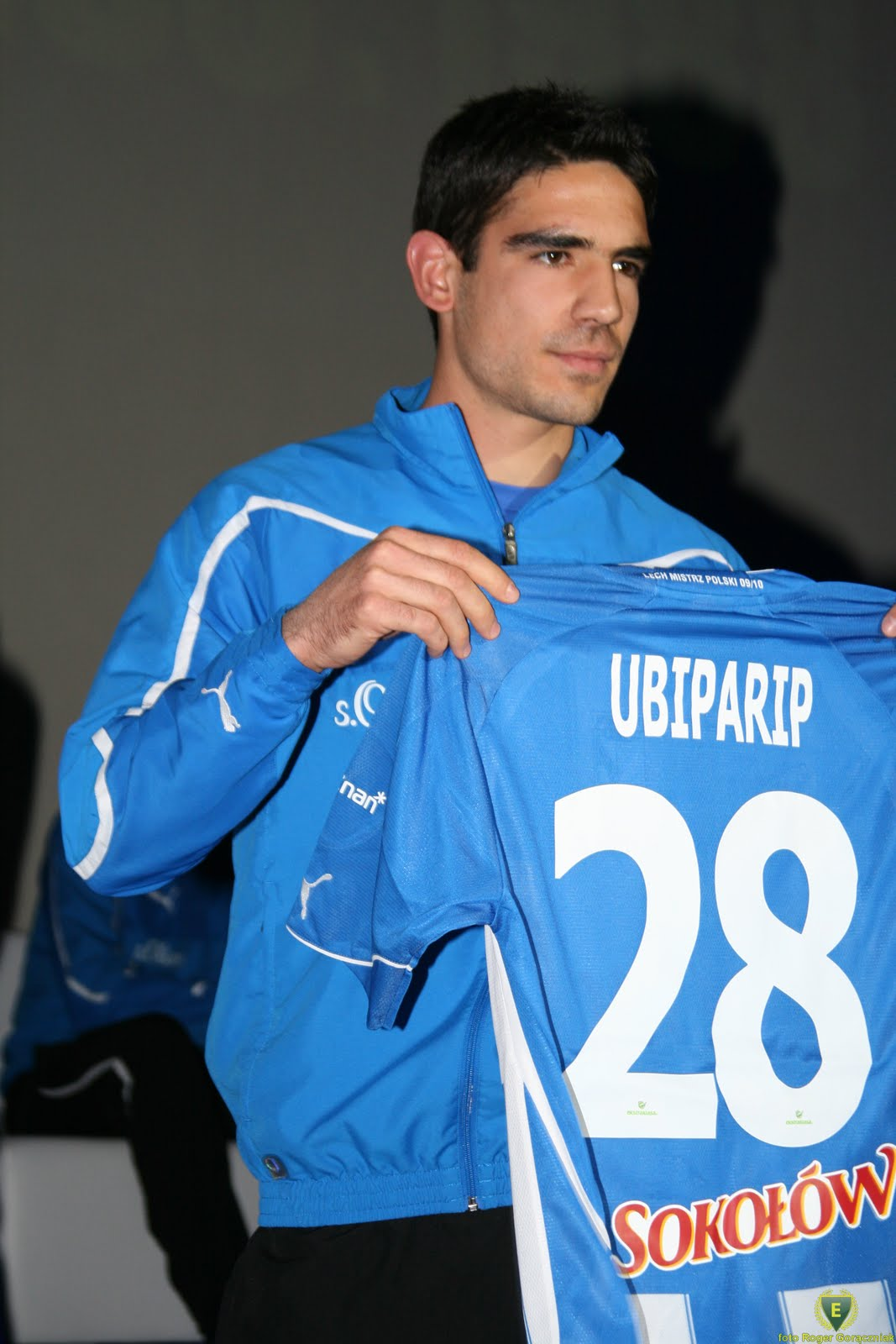
- Ubiparip with Lech Poznań in 2011

Personal information
- Date of birth: 10 May 1988 (age 38)
- Place of birth: Novi Sad, SFR Yugoslavia
- Height: 1.80 m (5 ft 11 in)
- Position: Striker

Youth career
- –2006: Vojvodina

Senior career*
Years	Team	Apps	(Gls)
2006–2008	Vojvodina	6	(0)
2006	→ Proleter Novi Sad (loan)	1	(0)
2007	→ Borac Čačak (loan)	3	(0)
2007	→ ČSK Čelarevo (loan)	13	(2)
2008	→ Horgoš (loan)	13	(10)
2008–2010	Spartak Subotica	69	(21)
2011–2015	Lech Poznań	58	(12)
2015	Lech Poznań II	4	(0)
2015	Vasas	9	(1)
2016	Novi Pazar	14	(6)
2016–2017	Górnik Łęczna	17	(2)
2017–2018	Željezničar	20	(7)
2018–2021	Tuzla City	83	(31)
2022	Radnički Kragujevac	20	(2)
2023–2025	Spartak Subotica	72	(12)
Total		402	(106)

International career
2006	Serbia U19 (Note: Only official UEFA matches included)	3	(2)
2010	Serbia U21	2	(1)
- * Club domestic league appearances and goals as of 15 June 2025

Vojislav "Vojo" Ubiparip (Serbian Cyrillic: Војислав Војо Убипарип; born 10 May 1988) is a Serbian retired footballer who last played as a striker for Spartak Subotica.

== Club career ==
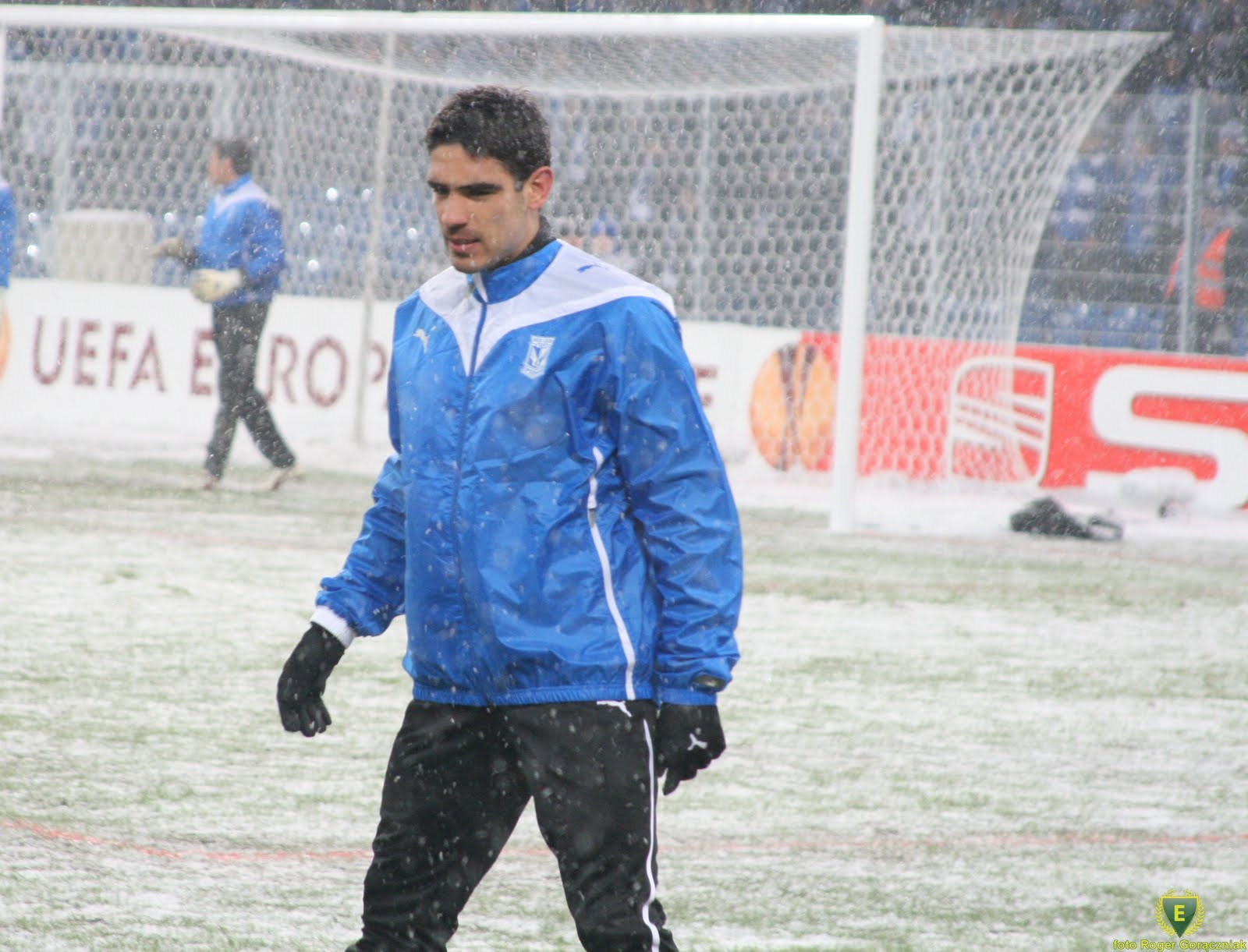
Ubiparip as a player of Lech Poznań in 2010–11 UEFA Europa League

A product of the Vojvodina youth system, Ubiparip made six appearances for the club in the 2006–07 Serbian SuperLiga. He also spent some time on loan at Proleter Novi Sad, Borac Čačak, ČSK Čelarevo, and Horgoš. In the summer of 2008, Ubiparip became a member of Spartak Subotica, helping them to promotion to the top flight in the 2008–09 season. He subsequently scored 10 goals in 25 games during the 2009–10 Serbian SuperLiga.

In January 2011, Ubiparip was transferred to Lech Poznań on a four-and-a-half-year contract. He made seven appearances and scored three goals in the 2014–15 Ekstraklasa, helping them win the title. In total, Ubiparip scored 12 league goals in 58 appearances for Lech Poznań.

In August 2015, Ubiparip signed a one-year deal with Hungarian club Vasas.

After Vasas, he also played for Novi Pazar, Górnik Łęczna and Željezničar. With Željezničar he won the 2017–18 Bosnian Cup.

On 6 September 2018, Ubiparip signed a two-and-a-half-year contract with Tuzla City. Since signing with Tuzla City, he has been one of their most important players, scoring so far 31 goals in 71 league matches for the club over three seasons.

== International career ==
A former Serbia U19 international, Ubiparip was capped twice for the Serbia under-21 team in 2010, scoring once.

== Honours ==
Lech Poznań

- Ekstraklasa: 2014–15

Željezničar

- Bosnian Cup: 2017–18
