= Senad Karahmet =

Bosnian-Herzegovinian footballer

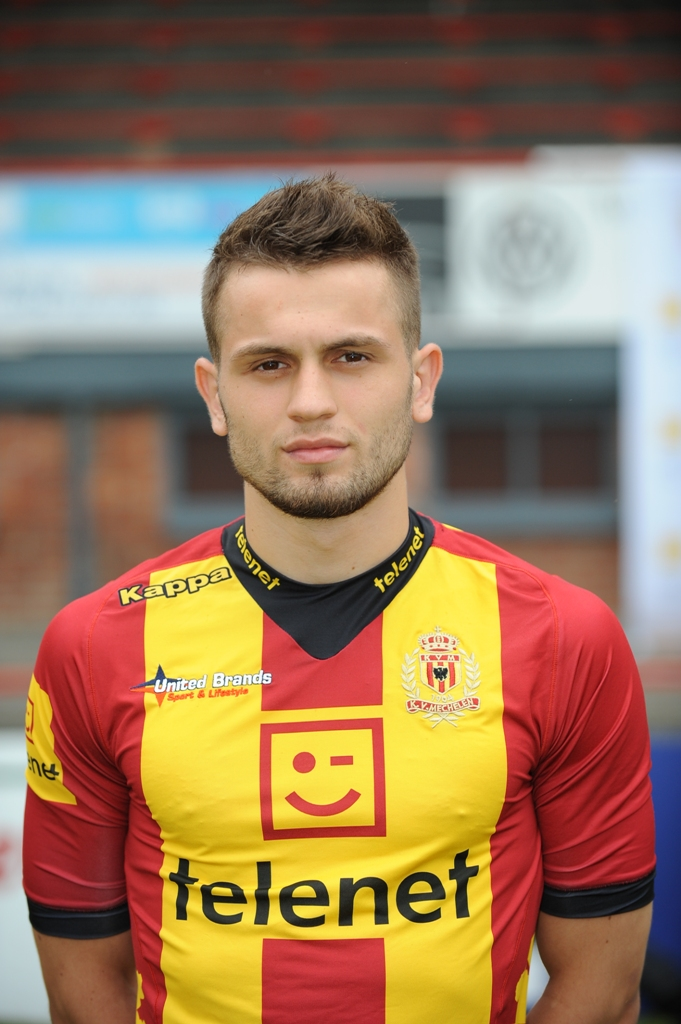

Personal information
- Full name: Senad Karahmet
- Date of birth: 25 February 1992 (age 34)
- Place of birth: Doboj, SFR Yugoslavia
- Height: 1.86 m (6 ft 1 in)
- Position: Left-back

Youth career
- 2008–2009: Antwerp FC
- 2009–2012: KV Mechelen

Senior career*
Years	Team	Apps	(Gls)
2012–2014	KV Mechelen	12	(0)
2014	Ruch Chorzów	0	(0)
2015–2018	Mladost Doboj Kakanj	56	(1)
2018	Čelik Zenica	0	(0)
2018–2019	Cappellen		
2019	Heist	4	(0)
2020–2021	City Pirates		
- * Club domestic league appearances and goals

Senad Karahmet (born 25 February 1992) is a Bosnian-Herzegovinian former professional footballer who played as left–back.

== Club career ==
Karahmet made his debut in Jupiler Pro League on 28 April 2012 in the home play-off match against K. Lierse SK, KV Mechelen won this game with 4–3. He was in the starting line-up of his team since Antonio Ghomsi was suspended. He joined Belgian 4th tier side City Pirates in summer 2020.
