= Meldin Jusufi =

Bosnian footballer

Personal information
- Full name: Meldin Jusufi
- Date of birth: 30 December 1998 (age 27)
- Place of birth: Sarajevo, Bosnia and Hercegovina
- Height: 1.79 m (5 ft 10 in)
- Position: Winger

Team information
- Current team: Olimpik
- Number: 12

Senior career*
Years	Team	Apps	(Gls)
	Olimpik	4	(0)
2018	Željezničar	0	(0)
2018–2019	Olimpik	22	(2)
2019	Rabotnički	3	(0)
2020	Radnik Hadžići	0	(0)
2020–	Olimpik	6	(0)
- * Club domestic league appearances and goals as of 31 October 2020

Meldin Jusufi (born 30 December 1998) is a Bosnian professional footballer who plays as a winger for Bosnian Premier League club Olimpik.

== Club career ==
Jusufi moved abroad in September 2019, when he joined Macedonian First Football League side Rabotnički.

== Honours ==
Željezničar

- Bosnian Cup: 2017–18
