= Nikola Krajinović =

Croatian footballer

Personal information
- Date of birth: 9 November 1999 (age 27)
- Place of birth: Karlovac, Croatia
- Height: 1.76 m (5 ft 9 in)
- Position: Right winger

Youth career
- 2008: Ilovac
- 2008–2012: Karlovac
- 2012–2014: Karlovac 1919
- 2014–2017: Lokomotiva

Senior career*
Years	Team	Apps	(Gls)
2017–2019	Lokomotiva	20	(1)
2019	→ Rudeš (loan)	6	(0)
2019–2020	Osijek II	2	(0)
2020	Hrvatski Dragovoljac	3	(0)
2020–2025	Koper	81	(2)

International career
2015	Croatia U16	2	(0)
2018–2019	Croatia U20	6	(0)
- * Club domestic league appearances and goals as of 25 May 2025

Nikola Krajinović (Serbo-Croatian pronunciation: [nǐkola krajǐːnoʋitɕ]; born 9 November 1999) is a Croatian football player.

== Club career ==
He made his Croatian First Football League debut for NK Lokomotiva on 26 May 2017 in a game against HNK Cibalia. On 4 January 2019, Krajinović was loaned out to NK Rudeš for the rest of the season. In summer 2019, he joined NK Osijek's reserve team.
