= 2017–18 Bosnia and Herzegovina Football Cup =

22nd Bosnia and Herzegovina Football Cup

Tournament details
- Country: Bosnia and Herzegovina
- Teams: 32

Final positions
- Champions: Željezničar (6th title)
- Runners-up: Krupa

Tournament statistics
- Matches played: 37
- Goals scored: 112 (3.03 per match)
- Top goal scorer(s): Elvir Koljić (5 goals)

The 2017–18 Bosnia and Herzegovina Football Cup was the 22nd edition of Bosnia and Herzegovina's annual football cup, and the eighteenth season of the unified competition. The winner will qualify to the 2018–19 UEFA Europa League.

== Format changes ==
From this season on, Second round will be played over one leg instead of two. Also, if teams from different levels are paired in First round, team from lower league will host the match.

== Participating teams ==
Following teams will take part in 2017–18 Bosnia and Herzegovina Football Cup.

2017–18 Premier League (12 teams)	2017–18 FBiH Cup (12 teams)	Football Association of Republika Srpska teams (8 teams)
Široki Brijeg^{title holder}; Borac Banja Luka; Čelik Zenica; GOŠK Gabela; Krupa; Mladost DK; Radnik Bijeljina; Sarajevo; Sloboda Tuzla; NK Vitez; Zrinjski Mostar; Željezničar Sarajevo	First League of the FBiH (II): Bosna Visoko; Bratstvo Gračanica; Metalleghe Jajce; Olimpic Sarajevo; Sloga Simin Han; Slaven Živinice; TOŠK Tešanj; Velež Mostar; Second League of the FBiH (III): Azot Vitkovići (group Center); Grude (group South); Svatovac Poljice (group North); FK Vitez (group West)	First League of the Republika Srpska (II): Kozara Gradiška; Rudar Prijedor; Slavija Istočno Sarajevo; Sutjeska Foča; Tekstilac Derventa; Zvijezda 09; Second League of the Republika Srpska (III): Leotar Trebinje (group East); Ljubić Prnjavor (group West)

Roman number in brackets denote the level of respective league in Bosnian football league system

== Calendar ==
Round	Date(s)
1st Round	12 September 2017 (draw); 19, 20 September 2017
2nd Round	18 October 2017 (draw); 25 October, 1 November 2017
Quarter final	7 November 2017 (draw); 22, 30 November 2017 (leg 1); 29 November, 7 December 2017 (leg 2)
Semi final	4 April 2018(draw); 11 April 2018 (leg 1); 18 April 2018 (leg 2)
Final	(draw)^{1} 2 May 2018 (leg 1); 9 May 2018 (leg 2)

^{1} Draw is held to determine what team will host leg 1 and what team will host leg 2.

== Bracket ==
Quarter-finals
Olimpic Sarajevo	1	0	1
Zvijezda 09 Bijeljina	2	0	2
Rudar Prijedor	0	2	2
Krupa	3	3	6
Široki Brijeg	0	0	0
Željezničar Sarajevo	1	2	3
Sloga Simin Han	0	0	0
Sloboda Tuzla	0	2	2

Semi-finals
Zvijezda 09 Bijeljina	0	0	0
Krupa	4	2	6
Željezničar Sarajevo	0	4	4
Sloboda Tuzla	0	1	1

Final
Krupa	0	0	0
Željezničar Sarajevo	2	4	6

== First round ==
Played on 19 and 20 September 2017

Home team	Away team	Result
Metalleghe Jajce (II)	Željezničar Sarajevo (I)	0–1
Mladost Doboj Kakanj (I)	Sarajevo (I)	0–0 (4–3 p)
Rudar Prijedor (II)	Tekstilac Derventa (II)	1–1 (4–3 p)
Radnik Bijeljina (I)	Široki Brijeg (I)	0–1
Sloga Simin Han (II)	Zrinjski Mostar (I)	1–0
Zvijezda 09 (II)	Bosna Visoko (II)	2–0
FK Vitez (III)	Borac Banja Luka (I)	3–8
Slaven Živinice (II)	Čelik Zenica (I)	2–2 (4–5 p)
Leotar Trebinje (III)	Kozara Gradiška (II)	4–0
Velež Mostar (II)	Olimpic Sarajevo (II)	1–3
Ljubić Prnjavor (III)	NK Vitez (I)	0–6
Bratstvo Gračanica (II)	Sutjeska Foča (II)	6–1
Azot Vitkovići (III)	Sloboda Tuzla (I)	1–2
Svatovac Poljice (III)	Slavija Istočno Sarajevo (II)	1–1 (5–4 p)
Grude (III)	Krupa (I)	0–4
TOŠK Tešanj (II)	GOŠK Gabela (I)	2–2 (4–5 p)

== Second round ==
Played on 25 October and 1 November 2017

Home team	Away team	Result
Željezničar Sarajevo (I)	Mladost Doboj Kakanj (I)	2–1
Široki Brijeg (I)	NK Vitez (I)	3–0
Svatovac Poljice (III)	Sloga Simin Han (II)	0–2
Leotar Trebinje (III)	Zvijezda 09 (II)	1–1 (3–4 p)
Bratstvo Gračanica (II)	Sloboda Tuzla (I)	1–2
Borac Banja Luka (I)	Krupa (I)	0–2
Rudar Prijedor (II)	Čelik Zenica (I)	2–1
Olimpic Sarajevo (II)	GOŠK Gabela (I)	4–0

== Quarter final ==
First legs played on 22 and 30 November, return legs played on 29 November and 7 December

Team 1	Team 2	Leg 1	Leg 2	Agg. score
Široki Brijeg (I)	Željezničar Sarajevo (I)	0–1	0–2	0–3
Olimpik Sarajevo (II)	Zvijezda 09 (II)	1–2	0–0	1–2
Rudar Prijedor (II)	Krupa (I)	0–3	2–3	2–6
Sloga Simin Han (II)	Sloboda Tuzla (I)	0–0	0–2	0–2

== Semi final ==
First legs played on 11 April, return legs played on 18 April

Team 1	Team 2	Leg 1	Leg 2	Agg. score
Zvijezda 09 (II)	Krupa (I)	0–4	0–2	0–6
Željezničar Sarajevo (I)	Sloboda Tuzla (I)	0–0	4–1	4–1

== Final ==
First leg played on May 2, return leg played on May 9

Team 1	Team 2	Leg 1	Leg 2	Agg. score
Željezničar Sarajevo (I)	Krupa (I)	2–0	4–0	6–0

=== First leg ===
2 May 2018
17:30

Željezničar	2–0	Krupa
Zajmović 36'; Graovac 65'	Report

Stadion Grbavica, Sarajevo
Attendance: 3,600
Referee: Dragan Petrović

=== Second leg ===
9 May 2018
17:00

Krupa	0–4	Željezničar
	Report	Ubiparip 33'; Zajmović 45'; Zakarić 63'; Ramović 83'

Gradski Stadion, Krupa na Vrbasu
Attendance: 2,700
Referee: Irfan Peljto
