= 2014–15 Bosnia and Herzegovina Football Cup =

Football tournament season

Tournament details
- Country: Bosnia and Herzegovina
- Teams: 32 (competition proper); 144 (total)

Final positions
- Champions: Olimpik
- Runners-up: Široki Brijeg

Tournament statistics
- Matches played: 44
- Goals scored: 116 (2.64 per match)
- Top goal scorer(s): 7 goals Anel Hebibović (Velež Mostar)

The 2014–15 Bosnia and Herzegovina Football Cup was the twentieth season of Bosnia and Herzegovina's annual football cup, and a fifteenth season of the unified competition. The winner will qualify to the first qualifying round of the 2015–16 UEFA Europa League.

Sarajevo is the title holder, having won their fourth national cup title previous season.

== Qualification ==
32 teams take part in the Cup. Berths allocation is shown below:

- 16 teams (each) from the 2014–15 edition of the Premier League of Bosnia and Herzegovina
- 10 teams from the 2014–15 edition of the Federation of Bosnia and Herzegovina Cup; Final stage winners
- 6 best teams from the 2013–14 season of the First League of the Republika Srpska; as 2 teams from Republika Srpska got relegated from previous season of Premier League, those two teams will qualify so 4 best teams from previous First League season will take part in Cup

== Participating teams ==
Following teams will take part in 2014–15 Bosnia and Herzegovina Football Cup.

2014–15 Premier League	2014–15 Federation of BiH Cup	2014–15 First League of the Republika Srpska
Sarajevo ^{title holder}; Zrinjski Mostar; Široki Brijeg; Željezničar Sarajevo; Velež Mostar; Borac Banja Luka; Čelik Zenica; Olimpik; Vitez; Radnik Bijeljina; Slavija Istočno Sarajevo; Mladost Velika Obarska; Travnik; Zvijezda Gradačac; Sloboda Tuzla; Drina Zvornik	First League of the FBiH (II): Bratstvo Gračanica; Goražde; Gradina Srebrenik; Igman Konjic; Jedinstvo Bihać; Metalleghe-BSI Jajce; Mladost Doboj Kakanj; Podgrmeč Sanski Most; Second League of the FBiH (III): Mladost Župča (group Center); Sloga Ljubuški (group South)	Sloboda Mrkonjić Grad (3rd in 2013–14 season); Drina Višegrad (5th); Napredak Donji Šepak (6th); Sloboda Novi Grad (7th); Proleter Teslić (9th); Rudar Prijedor (relegated from Premier League)

Roman number in brackets denote the level of respective league in Bosnian football league system

== Calendar ==
Round	Date(s)	Teams	Goals / games
1st Round	17 September 2014	32 → 16	37 / 16
2nd Round	1 October 2014 (leg 1); 22 October 2014 (leg 2)	16 → 8	48 / 16
Quarter final	11 March 2015 (leg 1); 18 March 2015 (leg 2)	8 → 4	28 / 8
Semi final	15 April 2015 (leg 1); 29 April 2015 (leg 2)	4 → 2	3 / 4
Final	20 May 2015 (leg 1); 27 May 2015 (leg 2)	2 → 1	

== First round ==
Played on 16/17 September 2014

Home team	Away team	Result
Rudar Prijedor (II)	Podgrmeč Sanski Most (II)	3–0
Sloga Ljubuški (III)	Drina HE Višegrad (II)	3–0
Slavija Istočno Sarajevo (I)	Velež Mostar (I)	1–2
Jedinstvo Bihać (II)	Široki Brijeg (I)	0–2
Sloboda Mrkonjić Grad (II)	Željezničar Sarajevo (I)	0–2
Metalleghe-BSI Jajce (II)	Proleter Teslić (II)	1–0
Mladost Doboj Kakanj (II)	Goražde (II)	1–0
Zvijezda Gradačac (I)	Sloboda Novi Grad (II)	5–1
Vitez (I)	Gradina Srebrenik (II)	1–1 (5–3 p)
Bratstvo Gračanica (II)	Olimpik (I)	0–0 (3–4 p)
Mladost Velika Obarska (I)	Mladost Župča (III)	1–0
Radnik Bijeljina (I)	Čelik Zenica (I)	1–5
Zrinjski Mostar (I)	Napredak Donji Šepak (II)	3–1
Travnik (I)	Sloboda Tuzla (I)	0–0 (3–1 p)
Borac Banja Luka (I)	Drina Zvornik (I)	0–0 (3–2 p)
Igman Konjic (II)	Sarajevo (I)	0–3

== Second round ==
Played on 30 September/1 October and 21/22 October 2014; over two legs

Team 1	Team 2	Leg 1	Leg 2	Agg. score
Rudar Prijedor (II)	Borac Banja Luka (I)	0–1	2–5	2–6
Široki Brijeg (I)	Željezničar Sarajevo (I)	2–0	1–1	3–1
Metalleghe-BSI Jajce (II)	Mladost Velika Obarska (I)	0–0	0–1	0–1
Mladost Doboj Kakanj (II)	Zvijezda Gradačac (I)	0–1	0–1	0–2
Sloga Ljubuški (III)	Zrinjski Mostar (I)	2–3	1–4	3–7
Sarajevo (I)	Travnik (I)	4–0	3–2	7–2
Olimpik (I)	Čelik Zenica (I)	4–0	0–1	4–1
Velež Mostar (I)	Vitez (I)	2–0	3–3	5–3

== Quarter final ==
Played on 11 and 18 March 2015; over two legs

Team 1	Team 2	Leg 1	Leg 2	Agg. score
Sarajevo (I)	Borac Banja Luka (I)	1–2	1–0	2–2 (a)
Mladost Velika Obarska (I)	Široki Brijeg (I)	1–3	0–5	1–8
Zrinjski Mostar (I)	Velež Mostar (I)	2–2	2–0	4–2
Zvijezda Gradačac (I)	Olimpik (I)	1–1	3–4	4–5

== Semi final ==
Played on 15 and 29 April 2015; over two legs

Team 1	Team 2	Leg 1	Leg 2	Agg. score
Olimpik (I)	Zrinjski Mostar (I)	0–0	0–0 (5–4 p)	0–0 (5–4 p)
Borac Banja Luka (I)	Široki Brijeg (I)	0–0	1–2	1–2

=== First leg ===
15 April 2015	Olimpik	0–0	Zrinjski Mostar	Stadion Otoka, Sarajevo
16:30				Attendance: 500; Referee: Dragan Skakić

15 April 2015	Borac Banja Luka	0–0	Široki Brijeg	Banja Luka City Stadium, Banja Luka
19:30				Attendance: 2,000; Referee: Irfan Peljto

=== Second leg ===
29 April 2015	Zrinjski Mostar	0–0 (0–0 agg.) (4–5 p)	Olimpik	Stadion pod Bijelim Brijegom, Mostar
18:00				Attendance: 3,000; Referee: Edin Jakupović
	Penalties
	Stojkić (penalty missed); Đurić (penalty scored); Šćepanović (penalty scored); Radulović (penalty scored); Crnov (penalty scored); Pehar (penalty missed)		(penalty scored) Bogičević; (penalty scored) Pereira; (penalty scored) Merajić; (penalty scored) Handžić; (penalty missed) Muharemović; (penalty scored) Jusufović

29 April 2015	Široki Brijeg	2–1 (2–1 agg.)	Borac Banja Luka	Pecara Stadium, Široki Brijeg
19:30	Wagner 30'; Wagner 85'		Ilić 36'	Attendance: 500; Referee: Admir Šehović

== Final ==
Played on 20 and 27 May 2015; over two legs

Team 1	Team 2	Leg 1	Leg 2	Agg. score
Široki Brijeg (I)	Olimpik (I)	1–1	1–1	2–2 (4–5 p)

=== First leg ===
20 May 2015	Široki Brijeg	1–1	Olimpik	Pecara Stadium, Široki Brijeg
20:00	Regoje 79' (o.g.)		Muharemović 10'	Attendance: 2,000; Referee: Dragan Skakić

=== Second leg ===
27 May 2015	Olimpik	1–1 (2–2 agg.) (5–4 p)	Široki Brijeg	Asim Ferhatović Hase Stadium, Sarajevo
20:00	Muharemović 56'		Peko 44'	Attendance: 1,000; Referee: Ognjen Valjić
	Penalties
	Stefan (penalty scored); Brković (penalty scored); Jusufović (penalty scored); Handžić (penalty scored); Muharemović (penalty scored)		(penalty scored) Wagner; (penalty scored) Zakarić; (penalty scored) Ivanković; (penalty scored) Ćorić; (penalty missed) Landeka
