= 2017–18 Federation of Bosnia and Herzegovina Cup =

2017–18 Federation of Bosnia and Herzegovina Football Cup
Tournament details
- Country: Bosnia and Herzegovina
- Teams: 32

Tournament statistics
- Matches played: 20
- Goals scored: 61 (3.05 per match)

The 2017–18 Federation of Bosnia and Herzegovina Cup was the qualifying competition for the 2017–18 Bosnia and Herzegovina Football Cup.

== Format ==
32 teams took part in two rounds of the competition with 12 Second round winners qualifying for the national competition.

=== Participating teams ===
16 First League of the Federation of Bosnia and Herzegovina teams were joined by 16 lower league teams (third level and lower).

Six cantons with the most teams competing in the cup had two teams each in the competition while remaining the four cantos had one team each. Each canton organized its own cup tournament which acted as the FBiH Cup qualifying stage. If there were not enough teams interested in taking part in canton cup, no cup was organized and the canton FA chose one team to represent them in the FBiH Cup.

2017–18 First league of the Federation of BiH (II) (16 teams)	Lower league teams (16 teams)
Bosna Visoko; Bratstvo Gračanica; Čapljina; Igman Konjic; Iskra Bugojno; Jedinstvo Bihać; Metalleghe-BSI Jajce; Olimpic Sarajevo; Orašje; Rudar Kakanj; Slaven Živinice; Sloga Simin Han; TOŠK Tešanj; Travnik; Velež Mostar; Zvijezda Gradačac	Central Bosnia Canton Cup winner and runner-up: Busovača (III) ^{winner}; FK Vitez (III); Herzegovina-Neretva Canton Cup winner and runner-up: Bjelopoljac Bijelo Polje (IV) ^{winner}; Cim (III); Posavina Canton Cup winner and runner-up (23 teams): Dinamo Donja Mahala (III); Dizdaruša Brčko (III); Sarajevo Canton Cup winner and runner-up: Ilijaš (III) ^{winner}; Jug Sarajevo (IV); Tuzla Canton Cup winner and runner-up: Lokomotiva Miričina (III); Svatovac Poljice (III); Zenica-Doboj Canton Cup winner and runner-up: Nemila (IV) ^{winner}; Usora (III); Bosnian Podrinje Canton Cup winner: Azot Vitkovići (III); Canton 10 Team selected by Canton FA: Kamešnica Podhum (III); Una-Sana Canton Cup winner: Ključ (III); West Herzegovina Canton team selected by Canton FA: Grude (III)

Roman number in brackets denote the level of respective league in Bosnian football league system in 2017-18 season

== Calendar ==
Round	Date(s)
1st Round	16 August 2017 (draw); 23 August 2017
2nd Round	30 August 2017 (draw); 6 September 2017

== First round ==
Played on 23 August 2017

Home team	Away team	Result
Nemila (IV)	Cim (III)	3–1
Bjelopoljac Bijelo Polje (IV)	Grude (III)	0–5
Azot Vitkovići (III)	Jug Sarajevo (IV)	1–0
Ilijaš (III)	Busovača (III)	3–1
Ključ (III)	Kamešnica Podhum (III)	2–0
FK Vitez (III)	Usora (III)	8–2
Lokomotiva Miričina (III)	Dinamo Donja Mahala (III)	0–3
Dizdaruša Brčko (III)	Svatovac Poljice (III)	0–1

== Second round ==
Played on 6 September 2017

Home team	Away team	Result
Ilijaš (III)	Bosna Visoko (II)	2–2 (1–4 p)
Nemila (IV)	Bratstvo Gračanica (II)	1–3
Svatovac Poljice (III)	Rudar Kakanj (II)	0–0 (5–3 p)
Jedinstvo Bihać (II)	FK Vitez (III)	0–4
Azot Vitkovići (III)	Bratstvo Gradačac (II)	0–0 (3–2 p)
Dinamo Donja Mahala (III)	Velež Mostar (II)	0–3
Grude (III)	Igman Konjic (II)	1–1 (5–3 p)
Ključ (III)	TOŠK Tešanj (II)	0–1
Metalleghe Jajce (II)	Travnik (II)	4–0
Olimpic Sarajevo (II)	Iskra Bugojno (II)	4–0
Orašje (II)	Sloga Simin Han (II)	2–3
Slaven Živinice (II)	Čapljina (II)	0–0 (4–2 p)
