= Jahić =

Jahić is a Bosnian patronymic surname formed by adding the Slavic diminutive suffix -ić to the Bosnian rendition Jahja of the common male Muslim name Yahya, the Arabic version of the name John (thus roughly corresponding to the English surnames Johnson, Jones etc.). Notable people with the surname include:

- Danial Jahić (1979–2021), Serbian long jumper
- Fahreta Jahić (born 1960), Yugoslav and Serbian singer
- Muamer Jahić (born 1979), Bosnian footballer
- Safet Jahič (born 1987), Slovenian footballer
- Sanel Jahić (born 1981), Bosnian footballer
- Senad Jahić (born 1987), Slovenian footballer
