= 2001–02 Premier League of Bosnia and Herzegovina =

Premijer Liga
- Season: 2001–02
- Champions: Željezničar; 2nd Premier League title 3rd Bosnian title 4th Domestic title
- Relegated: Olimpik; Troglav; Grude; Iskra
- Champions League: Željezničar
- UEFA Cup: Široki Brijeg; Sarajevo
- Intertoto Cup: Brotnjo
- Matches played: 240
- Goals scored: 603 (2.51 per match)
- Top goalscorer: Ivica Huljev (15 goals)

Statistics of Premier League of Bosnia and Herzegovina in the 2001–02 season. It was contested by Bosniak and Croatian clubs. Serbian clubs played in the 2001–02 First League of the Republika Srpska.

== Overview ==
It was contested by 16 teams, and FK Željezničar Sarajevo won the championship.

== Clubs and stadiums ==
Location of clubs in Premijer Liga 2001-02

Club	City	Stadium
Bosna	Visoko	Stadion Luke
Brotnjo	Čitluk	Bare Stadium
Čelik	Zenica	Bilino Polje
Grude	Grude	Stadion Elić Luka
Iskra	Bugojno	Stadion Jaklić
Jedinstvo	Bihać	Stadion pod Borićima
Olimpik	Sarajevo	Stadion Otoka
Orašje	Orašje	Gradski stadion (Orašje)
Posušje	Posušje	Mokri Dolac Stadium
Sarajevo	Sarajevo	Asim Ferhatović Hase Stadium
Sloboda	Tuzla	Stadion Tušanj
Široki Brijeg	Široki Brijeg	Stadion Pecara
Troglav	Livno	Stadion Zgona
Velež	Mostar	Vrapčići Stadium
Zrinjski	Mostar	Stadion pod Bijelim Brijegom
Željezničar	Sarajevo	Stadion Grbavica

== League standings ==
Pos	Team	Pld	W	D	L	GF	GA	GD	Pts	Qualification or relegation
1	Željezničar (C)	30	19	5	6	60	26	+34	62	Qualification to Champions League first qualifying round
2	Široki Brijeg	30	14	9	7	43	24	+19	51	Qualification to UEFA Cup qualifying round
3	Brotnjo	30	14	5	11	45	27	+18	47	Qualification to Intertoto Cup first round
4	Sarajevo	30	13	8	9	50	34	+16	47	Qualification to UEFA Cup qualifying round (Note: Sarajevo won 2001–02 Bosnian Cup and qualified for the qualifying round of the UEFA Cup.)
5	Zrinjski	30	13	7	10	35	39	−4	46	
6	Čelik	30	12	7	11	39	30	+9	43	
7	Orašje	30	13	4	13	38	38	0	43	
8	Velež	30	13	3	14	44	46	−2	42	
9	Jedinstvo Bihać	30	12	5	13	33	39	−6	41	
10	Sloboda Tuzla	30	11	7	12	32	28	+4	40	
11	Posušje	30	12	4	14	30	38	−8	40	
12	Bosna	30	11	6	13	33	48	−15	39	
13	Olimpik (R)	30	11	5	14	40	46	−6	38	Relegation to Prva Liga FBiH
14	Troglav (R)	30	8	8	14	33	49	−16	32	Relegation to Prva Liga FBiH
15	Grude (R)	30	8	7	15	23	43	−20	31	Relegation to Prva Liga FBiH
16	Iskra (R)	30	7	8	15	25	48	−23	29	Relegation to Prva Liga FBiH

Source: RSSSF.org
Rules for classification: 1) points; 2) goal difference; 3) number of goals scored.
(C) Champions; (R) Relegated

== Results ==
Home \ Away	BOS	BRO	ČEL	GRU	ISK	JED	OLI	ORA	POS	SAR	SLO	ŠB	TRO	VEL	ZRI	ŽEL
Bosna		1–0	1–0	1–0	2–0	2–1	1–0	1–1	1–1	2–1	2–0	0–0	4–2	1–1	2–0	1–1
Brotnjo	5–1		1–1	3–1	6–0	3–0	3–0	4–0	1–0	2–0	2–0	1–0	2–1	2–0	3–1	1–2
Čelik	2–1	0–0		1–0	1–1	2–0	3–0	2–0	1–0	2–0	0–2	1–0	5–0	2–0	5–2	2–0
Grude	2–1	1–1	1–0		1–0	3–1	3–0	1–0	0–1	0–0	1–0	0–0	0–0	1–0	0–0	0–0
Iskra	2–1	1–0	1–0	2–1		1–0	0–0	0–0	2–1	2–2	2–2	0–1	2–1	1–2	1–1	2–2
Jedinstvo Bihać	2–0	3–2	2–1	3–0	3–1		3–1	3–1	2–0	0–0	1–0	1–0	0–0	3–2	2–0	0–3
Olimpik	1–0	2–0	2–2	2–1	2–0	4–2		4–2	2–0	0–1	0–0	3–1	3–1	6–0	3–1	1–2
Orašje	3–0	2–0	1–0	3–0	1–0	0–0	4–1		3–0	2–1	1–1	1–2	2–0	2–1	2–0	2–1
Posušje	3–1	1–0	2–0	1–0	2–1	0–0	0–0	0–2		2–1	1–0	1–0	1–0	3–0	4–1	0–2
Sarajevo	6–1	2–0	2–2	3–1	4–1	3–1	4–0	3–0	2–1		2–1	2–1	1–0	4–2	2–2	2–2
Sloboda Tuzla	0–2	1–2	1–1	1–0	1–0	3–0	0–0	3–1	1–0	2–0		1–1	4–1	2–0	2–0	1–0
Široki Brijeg	1–1	1–1	4–0	3–1	3–1	1–0	1–0	4–1	1–0	0–0	1–1		1–0	3–0	2–2	3–1
Troglav	4–2	0–0	0–0	6–1	2–1	0–0	3–2	1–0	2–2	2–1	1–0	2–5		2–1	1–3	0–0
Velež	5–0	2–0	3–2	4–0	0–0	3–0	1–0	3–1	6–2	1–0	3–1	0–3	0–0		2–0	2–0
Zrinjski	1–0	1–0	1–0	2–2	3–0	1–0	2–0	1–0	2–0	1–1	1–0	0–0	2–0	1–0		3–1
Željezničar	3–0	2–0	2–1	4–1	3–0	2–0	5–1	1–0	4–1	1–0	2–1	2–0	4–1	4–0	4–0	

Source: RSSSF.org
Legend: Blue = home team win; Yellow = draw; Red = away team win.

== See also ==
- 2001–02 First League of the Republika Srpska
