= Nijaz =

Nijaz is a Bosnian masculine given name. Notable people with the name include:

== Given name ==
- Nijaz Duraković (1949–2012), former officeholder of President of the League of Communists of Bosnia and Herzegovina
- Nijaz Ferhatović (born 1955), Bosnian football defender
- Nijaz Gracić (1953–2026), Bosnian football administrator
- Nijaz Ibrulj (born 1956), Bosnian philosopher and professor
- Nijaz Lena (born 1986), Macedonian footballer
- Nijaz Merdanović (born 1957), Bosnian football player
