= Pavle Delibašić =

Serbian footballer

Personal information
- Date of birth: 30 November 1978 (age 47)
- Place of birth: Kosovska Mitrovica, SFR Yugoslavia
- Height: 1.86 m (6 ft 1 in)
- Position: Striker

Youth career
- Red Star Belgrade

Senior career*
Years	Team	Apps	(Gls)
1998–1999	Radnički Kragujevac	3	(0)
1999–2001	Jedinstvo Ub		
2001–2002	Leotar		
2002	Budućnost Banatski Dvor	14	(6)
2003–2004	Leotar	39	(14)
2004–2005	Spartak Subotica	14	(8)
2005–2007	Čukarički	49	(22)
2006	→ Chongqing Lifan (loan)		
2007–2008	Kalithea	22	(3)
2008–2009	Lokomotiv Plovdiv	21	(10)
2009	Zemun	11	(5)
2010	Minyor Pernik	11	(2)
2010	Bežanija	7	(1)
2011	Novi Pazar	10	(4)
2011	Napredak Kruševac	12	(3)
2012	Teuta	3	(0)
2012	Banat Zrenjanin	10	(0)
2013	Žarkovo		

Managerial career
- Čukarički (assistant)
- Čukarički (youth)
- * Club domestic league appearances and goals

Pavle Delibašić (Serbian Cyrillic: Павле Делибашић; born 30 November 1978) is a Serbian retired footballer.

Delibašić played for Spartak Subotica, Bosnian FK Leotar, FK Čukarički, Chinese Chongqing Lifan and Greek Kallithea F.C., back in Serbia with FK Zemun and with Bulgarian Minyor Pernik and FK Banat Zrenjanin.

== Career ==
In 1995–96 season as 17-year-old Delibašić played for the junior team of Red Star Belgrade, but he never played for the first team. In 2003, Delibašić played with FK Leotar in the Champions League qualifying rounds after winning the 2002–03 Premier League of Bosnia and Herzegovina. In July 2003 he scored a goal in the 2nd qualifying round in a match against Slavia Praha, but the result of the match was a 1–2 loss for Leotar. The forward played 23 matches in 2003–04 and scored 7 goals. In summer 2005 he returned to Serbia and signed with FK Čukarički. One year later gone in Chinese Chongqing Lifan. In 2007–08 season Delibašić played for Greek Kallithea F.C.

In 2008, Delibašić signed a 2-year deal with Lokomotiv Plovdiv after being released from Kallithea. He was given the number 9 shirt. Delibašić made his official debut for Lokomotiv in a match against Slavia Sofia on 27 September 2008. He played for 33 minutes. The result of the match was a 0–2 loss for Loko.

On 2 October 2008 he scored his first goals for Lokomotiv Plovdiv against Lokomotiv Sofia. He scored two goals in the 32nd and 34th minute. The result of the match was a 3–2 win for Loko.

== Honours ==
Leotar

- First League of the Republika Srpska: 2001–02

Individual

- First League of the Republika Srpska top scorer: 2001–02 (21 goals)
