= 2014–15 Federation of Bosnia and Herzegovina Cup =

Tournament details
- Country: Bosnia and Herzegovina
- Teams: 26 (competition proper); 113 (total)

Tournament statistics
- Matches played: 97
- Goals scored: 377 (3.89 per match)

The 2014–15 Federation of Bosnia and Herzegovina Cup was the qualifying competition for the 2014–15 Bosnia and Herzegovina Football Cup.

== Competition format ==
The competition was played in two stages, the preliminary stage and the final stage. Through the whole previous football season, each of ten cantons in the Federation of Bosnia and Herzegovina had its own cup competition with winners advancing to the Federation Cup Preliminary stage. Teams from the Second League of the Federation of Bosnia and Herzegovina (third level) and the lower leagues took part in the canton cups while teams from the First League of the Federation of Bosnia and Herzegovina did not enter the canton cups, but relegated teams from the 2013–14 First League of FBiH season had the opportunity to qualify to the Federation cup in a playoff against the best team from their respective canton cup. The Playoff had to be completed before 1 August 2014.

The preliminary stage was divided into two groups of five teams each and consisted of two rounds, the First preliminary round and the Second preliminary round. In the First preliminary round four teams in each group were drawn into two matches and the winners advanced to the next round along with one team given a bye to the next round. The Second preliminary round saw three teams in each group with two teams drawn into one match and one team given a bye to the Final stage – no team could have been given byes in both rounds. The byed team was joined by the winner of the Second preliminary round match.

Group North was consisted of the next cantons: Posavina, Tuzla, Zenica-Doboj, Sarajevo and Bosnian-Podrinje.

Group South was consisted of the next cantons: Herzegovina-Neretva, Canton 10, West Herzegovina, Una-Sana and Central Bosnia.

The final stage was consisted of 20 teams – four teams from the Preliminary stage and 16 teams from the First League of the Federation of Bosnia and Herzegovina. They were drawn into 10 matches with winners advancing to the 2014–15 Bosnia and Herzegovina Football Cup.

== Canton cups ==
=== Una-Sana Canton ===
Statistics is shown in table below:

Teams took part	21 (+1 forfeited +1 removed by the FA)
Matches played	17
Goals scored	76
Biggest win	7 goals margin in two games: 8–1 Mladost – Bakšaiš (first round); 7–0 Krajišnik – Gomila (first round)
Highest scoring game	9 goals: 8–1 Mladost – Bakšaiš (first round)

==== First round ====
Played on 18 September 2013

Home team	Away team	Result
Mladost Polje (IV)	Bakšaiš (IV)	8–1
Omladinac Sanica (IV)	Rudar Kamengrad (IV)	5–2
Krajišnik V. Kladuša (IV)	Gomila Stijena (IV)	7–0
Mutnica Pjanići (IV)	Željezničar B. Krupa (IV)	1–1 (5–3 p)
Kamenica (IV)	Sloga 1937 Kralje (IV)	4–4 (4–3 p)
Bajer 99 Velagići (IV)	Borac Izačić (IV)	4–1

==== Second round ====
Played on 6 and 7 November 2013

Home team	Away team	Result
Krajina Cazin (III)	Krajišnik V. Kladuša (IV)	1–3
Mladost Vrnograč (III)	Kamenica (IV)	0–1
Omladinac 75 Pokoj (III)	Omladinac Sanica (IV)	bye
Ključ (III)	Mutnica Pjanići (IV)	5–0
Jedinstvo Bihać (II)	Mladost Polje (IV)	5–0
Brekovica 78 (III)	Sloga Bosanska Otoka (III)	2–2 (4–5 p)
Podgrmeč S. Most (II)	Bratstvo Bosanska Krupa (III)	bye
Una Kulen Vakuf (III)	Vitez Bužim (III)	4–3

Bajer 99 Velagići bye to next round
Omladinac Sanica and Bratstvo Bosanska Krupa forfeited

==== Third round ====
Played on 2 and 9 April 2014

Home team	Away team	Result
Ključ (III)	Una Kulen Vakuf (III)	4–0
Krajišnik V. Kladuša (IV)	Kamenica (IV)	3–0
Sloga Bosanska Otoka (III)	Bajer 99 Velagići (IV)	bye

Omladinac 75 Pokoj bye to next round
Jedinstvo Bihać and Podgrmeč Sanski Most will not play in next rounds as competition's format changed – only teams from Second league and lower can take part so they are removed from the Cup competition
Bajer 99 Velagići failed to show up to game

==== Semi final ====
Played on 16 April 2014

Home team	Away team	Result
Omladinac 75 Pokoj (III)	Sloga Bosanska Otoka (III)	0–1
Ključ (III)	Krajišnik V. Kladuša (IV)	2–0

==== Final ====
Played on 8 June 2014; in Cazin (neutral ground)

Team 1	Team 2	Result
Sloga Bosanska Otoka (III)	Ključ (III)	0–2

Ključ qualified to the Federation Cup Preliminary Stage

=== Posavina Canton ===
Statistics is shown in table below:

Teams took part	8
Matches played	7
Goals scored	24
Biggest win	6 goals margin: Mladost – Dinamo 75 6–0 (Semi final)
Highest scoring game	6 goals: Mladost – Dinamo 75 6–0 (Semi final)

==== First round ====
Played on 30 and 31 July 2014

Home team	Away team	Result
Dinamo Donja Mahala (IV)	Mladost Sibovac (IV)	2–3
Dinamo 75 Prijedor (IV)	Napredak Matići (IV)	2–0
Tramošnica (IV)	Odžak 102 (III)	0–2
Dizdaruša Brčko (III)	Posavina 108 Bijela (IV)	3–1

==== Semi final ====
Played on 3 and 5 August 2014

Home team	Away team	Result
Mladost Sibovac (IV)	Dinamo 75 Prijedor (IV)	6–0
Odžak 102 (III)	Dizdaruša Brčko (III)	3–0

==== Final ====
Played on 10 August 2014

Home team	Away team	Result
Odžak 102 (III)	Mladost Sibovac (IV)	1–1 (p)

Mladost Sibovac qualified to the Federation Cup Preliminary Stage

=== Tuzla Canton ===
Statistics is shown in table below:

Teams took part	26 (+6 forfeited)
Matches played	22
Goals scored	96
Biggest win	12 goals margin: Bambi – Radnik 1–13 (first round)
Highest scoring game	14 goals: Bambi – Radnik 1–13 (first round)

==== First round ====
Played on 16 April 2014

Home team	Away team	Result
Sloga Bikodže (IV)	Prokosovići (III)	2–0
Jedinstvo Lukavica (IV)	Mladost Malešići (III)	1–2
Mladost Kikači (V)	Bosna Kalesija (III)	2–1
Mladost Gornja Tuzla (V)	Mramor (III)	0–2
Željezničar Dobošnica (V)	Mladost Puračić (III)	1–3
Vrana Banovići Selo (V)	Slaven Živinice (III)	3–0
Gornji Rahić (IV)	Bosna Mionica (III)	bye
Mladost Gornje Živinice (VI)	Priluk (III)	0–5
Omladinac Đurđevik (VI)	Rudar Bukinje (III)	3–1
Bambi Tuzla (VI)	Radnik Lipnica (III)	1–13
Seona (IV)	Ingram Duboki Potok (III)	3–0
Mladost Doborovci (V)	Jedinstvo Vučkovci (IV)	1–3
12. Decembar Rajska (V)	Omladinac Mionica (III)	bye
Krušik (VI)	Sloga Tojšići (III)	1–5
Konjuh Kladanj (V)	Brčko 1978 (IV)	bye
Čelić (V)	Doboj Istok (IV)	bye

Omladinac Mionica, Brčko 1978 and Čelić forfeited
Bosna Mionica failed to show up to game

==== Second round ====
Played on 7 and 21 May 2014

Home team	Away team	Result
Doboj Istok (IV)	Sloga Bikodže (IV)	8–2
Mladost Malešići (III)	Konjuh Kladanj (V)	bye
Sloga Tojšići (III)	Mladost Kikači (V)	3–1
Mramor (III)	12. Decembar Rajska (V)	bye
Mladost Puračić (III)	Jedinstvo Vučkovci (IV)	bye
Radnik Lipnica (III)	Vrana Banovići Selo (V)	4–2
Gornji Rahić (IV)	Seona (IV)	3–1
Priluk (III)	Omladinac Đurđevik (VI)	5–2

Konjuh Kladanj, 12. Decembar Rajska and Jedinstvo Vučkovci forfeited

==== Quarter final ====
Played on 11 and 14 June 2014

Home team	Away team	Result
Doboj Istok (IV)	Priluk (III)	2–1
Mladost Malešići (III)	Gornji Rahić (IV)	bye
Sloga Tojšići (III)	Radnik Lipnica (III)	5–1
Mramor (III)	Mladost Puračić (III)	1–0

==== Semi final ====
Played on 17 June 2014

Home team	Away team	Result
Doboj Istok (IV)	Mramor (III)	0–2
Mladost Malešići (III)	Sloga Tojšići (III)	bye

==== Final ====
Played on 13 August 2014; in Prokosovići (neutral ground)

Team 1	Team 2	Result
Mramor (III)	Mladost Malešići (III)	0–0 (4–2 p)

Mramor qualified to the Federation Cup Preliminary Stage

=== Zenica-Doboj Canton ===
Statistics is shown in table below:

Teams took part	10 (+7 forfeited)
Matches played	9
Goals scored	38
Biggest win	6 goal margin: TOŠK – Proleter 7–1 (second round)
Highest scoring game	8 goals: TOŠK – Proleter 7–1 (second round)

==== First round ====
Played on 7 and 8 May 2014

Home team	Away team	Result
Rudar Zenica (IV)	Kosmos Porječani (-)	0–1
Vis Kosova (IV)	Nemila (IV)	bye
Proleter Makljenovac (IV)	Gradina Doboj Jug (IV)	2–2 (5–3 p)
Žepče (IV)	Napredak Šije (IV)	bye

Borac Tetovo bye to next round
Napredak Šije and Vis Kosova forfeited

==== Second round ====
Played on 28 May 2014

Home team	Away team	Result
TOŠK Tešanj (III)	Proleter Makljenovac (IV)	7–1
Žepče (IV)	Pobjeda Tešanjka (III)	4–0
Stupčanica Olovo (III)	Bosna Visoko (III)	bye
Rudar Breza (III)	Kosmos Porječani (-)	bye
Borac Tetovo (IV)	Natron Maglaj (III)	bye
Nemila (IV)	Borac Jelah (III)	bye

Usora bye to next round
Stupčanica Olovo, Rudar Breza, Natron Maglaj and Nemila forfeited

==== Third round ====
Played on 7 June 2014

Home team	Away team	Result
TOŠK Tešanj (III)	Usora (III)	3–0
Borac Tetovo (IV)	Borac Jelah (III)	bye
Bosna Visoko (III)	Kosmos Porječani (-)	6–0

Žepče bye to next round
Borac Tetovo forfeited

==== Semi final ====
Played on 14 June 2014

Home team	Away team	Result
Žepče (IV)	TOŠK Tešanj (III)	3–2
Borac Jelah (III)	Bosna Visoko (III)	bye

==== Final ====
Played on 10 and 13 August 2014; over two legs

Team 1	Team 2	Leg 1	Leg 2	Agg. score
Borac Jelah (III)	Žepče (IV)	2–1	1–3	3–4

Žepče qualified to the Federation Cup Preliminary Stage

=== Bosnian-Podrinje Canton ===
Statistics is shown in table below:

Teams took part	2
Matches played	1
Goals scored	1
Biggest win	1 goal margin: Goražde – Azot 0–1 (final)
Highest scoring game	1 goal: Goražde – Azot 0–1 (final)

==== Final ====
Played on 7 June 2014

Home team	Away team	Result
Goražde (III)	Azot Vitkovići (III)	0–1

Azot Vitkovići qualified to the Federation Cup Preliminary Stage
Goražde also qualified as they got promoted to the First League

=== Central Bosnia Canton ===
Statistics is shown in table below:

Teams took part	7 (+10 forfeited)
Matches played	6
Goals scored	30
Biggest win	6 goals margin: Busovača – Šantići 7–1 (first round)
Highest scoring game	8 goals: Busovača – Šantići 7–1 (first round)

==== First round ====
Played on 28 May 2014

Home team	Away team	Result
Fojnica (IV)	Bilalovac CPU (V)	bye
Kaćuni (V)	Lugovi (V)	5–0
Mladost Nević Polje (IV)	Gorica (V)	3–2
Kreševo (IV)	Kiseljak (IV)	bye
Busovača (IV)	Šantići (IV)	7–1
Rijeka (IV)	Karaula (V)	bye
Rudar Han Bila (IV)	Novi Travnik (IV)	bye
Elektrobosna Jajce (V)	Dnoluka (V)	0–2^{1}

Radnik Donji Vakuf bye to next round
Rudar Han Bila disqualified after failing to meet minimum criteria to organize the match
Bilalovac CPU, both Kreševo and Kiseljak, Rijeka and Rudar Han Bila forfeited
^{1}game interrupted, Elektrobosna Jajce disqualified

==== Second round ====
Played on 4 June 2014

Home team	Away team	Result
Mladost Nević Polje (IV)	Karaula (V)	bye
Kaćuni (V)	Busovača (IV)	3–2
Radnik Donji Vakuf (IV)	Novi Travnik (IV)	0–3
Dnoluka (V)	Fojnica (IV)	bye

Karaula and Fojnica forfeited

==== Third round ====
Played on 8 June 2014

Home team	Away team	Result
Novi Travnik (IV)	Kaćuni (V)	bye
Dnoluka (V)	Mladost Nević Polje (IV)	bye

Kaćuni and Dnoluka forfeited

==== Final ====
Played on 21 June 2014; in Travnik (neutral ground)

Team 1	Team 2	Result
Novi Travnik (IV)	Mladost Nević Polje (IV)	3–1

Novi Travnik qualified to the Federation Cup Preliminary Stage

=== Herzegovina-Neretva Canton ===
Competition is split in two stages. First stage consists of teams from canton league (fourth level) with winner qualifying to the Second stage. In Second stage First stage winner is joined by teams from the Second League with winner advancing to the Federation of BiH Cup.

Statistics is shown in table below:

Teams took part	13
Matches played	13
Goals scored	45
Biggest win	7 goals margin: Turbina – Višići 7–0 (Second stage – Final)
Highest scoring game	7 goals: Turbina – Višići 7–0 (Second stage – Final)

==== First stage – First round ====
Played on 6 May 2014

Home team	Away team	Result
Cim (IV)	Blagaj (IV)	3–1
Bjelopoljac Potoci (IV)	Jasenica (IV)	2–2 (3–5 p)
Buna (IV)	Lokomotiva Mostar (IV)	2–2 (5–4 p)
Neum (IV)	Međugorje (IV)	bye

Međugorje forfeited

==== First stage – Semi final ====
Played on 21 and 22 May

Home team	Away team	Result
Jasenica (IV)	Neum (IV)	2–2 (7–6 p)
Cim (IV)	Buna (IV)	2–2 (5–4 p)

==== First stage – Final ====
Played on 4 June 2014; in Čitluk (neutral ground)

Home team	Away team	Result
Cim (IV)	Jasenica (IV)	1–1 (5–4 p)

Both teams qualified to Second stage

==== Second stage – Quarter final ====
Played on 19 and 20 July 2014

Home team	Away team	Result
Brotnjo Čitluk (III)	Cim (IV)	3–0
Turbina Jablanica (II)	Klis Buturović Polje (III)	3–0
Iskra Stolac (III)	Jasenica (IV)	1–1 (5–4 p)
Višići (III)	Stolac (III)	1–0

==== Second stage – Semi final ====
Played on 26 and 27 July 2014

Home team	Away team	Result
Brotnjo Čitluk (III)	Turbina Jablanica (II)	2–2 (3–4 p)
Iskra Stolac (III)	Višići (III)	0–3

==== Second stage – Final ====
Played on 2 August 2014; in Cim (neutral ground)

Home team	Away team	Result
Turbina Jablanica (II)	Višići (III)	7–0

Turbina Jablanica qualified to the Federation Cup Preliminary Stage, but as they qualified via league too, Višići also qualified and will play in Preliminary stage

=== West Herzegovina Canton ===
Statistics is shown in table below:

Teams took part	2
Matches played	1
Goals scored	5
Biggest win	3 goals margin: Sloga – Posušje 4–1 (final)
Highest scoring game	5 goals: Sloga – Posušje 4–1 (final)

==== Final ====
Played on 13 August 2014

Home team	Away team	Result
Sloga Ljubuški (III)	Posušje (III)	4–1

Sloga Ljubuški qualified to the Federation Cup Preliminary Stage

=== Sarajevo Canton ===
Statistics is shown in table below:

Teams took part	4
Matches played	3
Goals scored	10
Biggest win	4 goals margin: Mladost – UNIS 5–1 (first round)
Highest scoring game	6 goals: Mladost – UNIS 5–1 (first round)

==== First round ====
Played on 6 and 7 May 2014

Home team	Away team	Result
Mladost Župča (III)	UNIS Vogošća (IV)	5–1
Radnik Hadžići (III)	Ilijaš (III)	0–2

==== Final ====
Played on 8 June 2014; in Vogošća (neutral ground)

Team 1	Team 2	Result
Ilijaš (III)	Mladost Župča (III)	1–1 (p)

Mladost Župča qualified to the Federation Cup Preliminary Stage

=== Canton 10 ===
Statistics is shown in table below:

Teams took part	6 (+3 forfeited)
Matches played	4
Goals scored	13
Biggest win	5 goals margin: Kamešnica – Tomislav 0–5 (final)
Highest scoring game	5 goals in two games: Šator – Junak 4–1 (first round); Kamešnica – Tomislav 0–5 (final)

==== First round ====
Played on 1 June 2014

Home team	Away team	Result
Šujica (IV)	Bužan Prisoje (V)	bye
Šator Glamoč (IV)	Junak Srđević (V)	4–1

Šujica forfeited

==== Second round ====
Played on 8 June 2014

Home team	Away team	Result
Šator Glamoč (IV)	Bužan Prisoje (IV)	0–0 (2–3 p)

==== Third round ====
Played on 23 July 2014

Home team	Away team	Result
Tomislav Tomislavgrad (III)	Sloga Uskoplje (III)	3–0
Kupres (III)	Kamešnica Podhum (III)	bye
Bužan Prisoje (IV)	Troglav Livno (IV)	bye

Kupres and both Bužan and Troglav forfeited

==== Final ====
Played on 29 July 2014

Home team	Away team	Result
Kamešnica Podhum (III)	Tomislav Tomislavgrad (III)	0–5

Tomislav Tomislavgrad qualified to the Federation Cup Preliminary Stage

=== Combined statistics ===
Teams took part	99
Teams forfeited	27
Matches played	83
Goals scored	338
Biggest win	12 goals margin: Bambi – Radnik 1–13 (Tuzla Canton)
Most goals in a match	14 goals: Bambi – Radnik 1–13 (Tuzla Canton)

== Federation of Bosnia and Herzegovina Cup ==
Statistics is shown in table below:

Teams took part	14 (+6 from previous rounds)
Matches played	15
Goals scored	39
Biggest win	5 goals margin: Tomislav – Ključ 6–1 (Second preliminary round)
Highest scoring game	7 goals: Tomislav – Ključ 6–1 (Second preliminary round)

=== Preliminary stage – Group North ===
Qualified teams:

Club	Canton	Level
Azot Vitkovići	Bosnian-Podrinje	III
Mladost Sibovac	Posavina	IV
Mladost Župča	Sarajevo	III
Mramor	Tuzla	III
Žepče	Zenica-Doboj	IV

==== First preliminary round ====
Played on 20 August 2014

Home team	Away team	Result
Žepče (IV)	Mladost Sibovac (IV)	0–0 (3–4 p)
Azot Vitkovići (III)	Mramor (III)	2–1

Mladost Župča bye to next round

==== Second preliminary round ====
Played on 27 August 2014

Home team	Away team	Result
Azot Vitkovići (III)	Mladost Župča (III)	0–0 (3–4 p)

Mladost Sibovac bye to Final stage

=== Preliminary stage – Group South ===
Qualified teams:

Club	Canton	Level
Tomislav Tomislavgrad	Canton 10	III
Novi Travnik	Central Bosnia	IV
Višići	Herzegovina-Neretva	III
Ključ	Una-Sana	III
Sloga Ljubuški	West Herzegovina	III

==== First preliminary round ====
Played on 20 August 2014

Home team	Away team	Result
Sloga Ljubuški (III)	Novi Travnik (III)	5–2^{1}
Višići (III)	Tomislav Tomislavgrad (III)	0–2

Ključ bye to next round
^{1}game interrupted in 65th minute after home fan assaulted an away player; Sloga was assigned 3–0 win

==== Second preliminary round ====
Played on 27 August 2014

Home team	Away team	Result
Tomislav Tomislavgrad (III)	Ključ (III)	6–1

Sloga Ljubuški bye to Final stage

=== Final stage ===
Qualified teams (teams from 2014–2015 First League season and four Preliminary stage teams):

Club	Canton	Level
Jedinstvo Bihać	Una-Sana	II^{2}
Bratstvo Gračanica	Tuzla	II^{2}
Rudar Kakanj	Zenica-Doboj	II^{2}
Orašje	Posavina	II^{2}
Mladost Doboj Kakanj	Zenica-Doboj	II^{2}
Čapljina	Herzegovina-Neretva	II^{2}
GOŠK Gabela	Herzegovina-Neretva	II^{2}
Gradina Srebrenik	Tuzla	II^{2}
Radnički Lukavac	Tuzla	II^{2}
Branitelj Mostar	Herzegovina-Neretva	II^{2}
Igman Konjic	Herzegovina-Neretva	II^{2}
Podgrmeč Sanski Most	Una-Sana	II^{2}
Budućnost Banovići	Tuzla	II^{2}
Goražde^{1}	Bosnia-Podrinje	II^{2}
Metalleghe-BSI Jajce	Central Bosnia	II^{2}
Turbina Jablanica^{1}	Herzegovina-Neretva	II^{2}
Mladost Sibovac	Posavina	IV
Mladost Župča	Sarajevo	III
Sloga Ljubuški	West Herzegovina	III
Tomislav Tomislavgrad	Canton 10	III

^{1}teams played in canton cups also as they were lower league members at the time
^{2}automatic qualification to this round

Played on 3 September 2014

Home team	Away team	Result
Metalleghe-BSI (II)	Turbina Jablanica (II)	1–0
Sloga Ljubuški (III)	Radnički Lukavac (II)	3–1
Mladost Doboj Kakanj (II)	GOŠK Gabela (II)	2–1
Mladost Sibovac (IV)	Podgrmeč Sanski Most (II)	0–2
Čapljina (II)	Goražde (II)	2–4
Igman Konjic (II)	Rudar Kakanj (II)	1–0
Gradina Srebrenik (II)	Budućnost Banovići (II)	4–0
Bratstvo Gračanica (II)	Orašje (II)	2–1
Tomislav Tomislavgrad (III)	Jedinstvo Bihać (II)	0–1
Mladost Župča (III)	Branitelj Mostar (II)	2–0
