= Mensur Dogan =

Bosnian football manager (born 1971)

Personal information
- Date of birth: 22 February 1971 (age 55)
- Place of birth: Jajce, SFR Yugoslavia

Managerial career
- Years: Team
- 1999–2000: Olimpik
- 2004–2005: Olimpik
- 2019: Radnik Hadžići

Mensur Dogan (born 22 February 1971) is a Bosnian professional football manager who was most recently director of the youth academy of Bosnian Premier League club Sarajevo.

== Managerial statistics ==
As of match played 5 October 2019

Team	From	To	Record							
Team	From	To	G	W	D	L	GF	GA	GD	Win %
Olimpik	1 July 1999	30 June 2000	30	16	8	6	43	19	+24	53.33
Radnik Hadžići	20 September 2019	8 October 2019	3	0	0	3	2	11	−9	0.00
Total			33	16	8	9	45	30	+15	48.48

== Honours ==
=== Manager ===
Olimpik

- Second League of FBiH: 2004–05 (Center)
