= Edin Prljača =

Bosnian footballer and manager

Personal information
- Date of birth: 26 April 1971 (age 55)
- Place of birth: Sarajevo, SFR Yugoslavia
- Position: Goalkeeper

Team information
- Current team: Kuala Lumpur City (Interim Head Coach)

Managerial career
- Years: Team
- 2001–2006: Bosnia and Herzegovina U21 (goalkeeping coach)
- 2003–2004: Igman Konjic
- 2004: Sarajevo (caretaker)
- 2007–2010: Bosnia and Herzegovina (goalkeeping coach)
- 2007–2009: Guangzhou Evergrande (goalkeeping coach)
- 2009–2010: Olimpik
- 2010–2011: Sarajevo (sporting director)
- 2012–2013: Travnik
- 2014–2016: Olimpik (sporting director)
- 2015–2016: Olimpik
- 2017: Travnik
- 2018: Čelik Zenica
- 2018–2019: Accra Lions
- 2019–2020: Čelik Zenica (sporting director)
- 2022–2023: Al-Arabi (assistant)
- 2024: PSS Sleman (assistant)
- 2025–2026: Kuala Lumpur City (assistant)
- 2026–: Kuala Lumpur City (interim)

Edin Prljača (born 26 April 1971) is a Bosnian professional football manager and former football goalkeeper. He is currently the interim head coach of Malaysia Super League club Kuala Lumpur City.
