= 2015–16 Federation of Bosnia and Herzegovina Cup =

Tournament details
- Country: Bosnia and Herzegovina
- Teams: 26 (competition proper; TBC) ? (total)

Tournament statistics
- Matches played: 55
- Goals scored: 193 (3.51 per match)

The 2015–16 Federation of Bosnia and Herzegovina Cup was the qualifying competition for the 2015–16 Bosnia and Herzegovina Football Cup.

== Competition format ==
The competition was played in two stages, the Preliminary stage and the Final stage. Through the whole previous football season, each of the ten cantons in the Federation of Bosnia and Herzegovina had its own cup competition with the winners advancing to the Federation Cup Preliminary stage. Teams from the Second League of the Federation of Bosnia and Herzegovina (third level) and the lower leagues took part in the canton cups, while teams from the First League of the Federation of Bosnia and Herzegovina did not enter the canton cups, but relegated teams from the 2014–15 First League of FBiH season had the opportunity to qualify to the Federation cup in a playoff against the best team from their respective canton cup. The playoff had to be completed before 1 August 2015.

The Preliminary stage was divided into two groups of five teams each and consisted of two rounds, the First preliminary round and the Second preliminary round. In the First preliminary round four teams in each group were drawn into two matches and the winners advanced to the next round along with one team given a bye to the next round. The Second preliminary round saw three teams in each group with two teams drawn into one match and one team given a bye to the Final stage - no team could have been given byes in both rounds. The byed team was joined by the winner of the Second preliminary round match.

Group North was consisted of the next cantons: Posavina, Tuzla, Zenica-Doboj, Sarajevo and Bosnian-Podrinje.

Group South was consisted of the next cantons: Herzegovina-Neretva, Canton 10, West Herzegovina, Una-Sana and Central Bosnia.

The Final stage was consisted of 20 teams - four teams from the Preliminary stage and 16 teams from the First League of the Federation of Bosnia and Herzegovina. They were drawn into 10 matches with winners advancing to the 2015–16 Bosnia and Herzegovina Football Cup.

== Canton cups ==
=== Una-Sana Canton ===
Statistics is shown in table below:

Teams took part	17 (+3 forfeited)
Matches played	16
Goals scored	50

==== First round ====
Played on 21 and 22 March 2015

Home team	Away team	Result
Omladinac 75 Pokoj (III)	Željezničar B. Krupa (IV)	0-1
Sloga Bosanska Otoka (III)	Mladost Polje (IV)	1-0
Rudar Kamengrad (IV)	Brekovica 78 (IV)	0-3
Gomila Stijena (IV)	Borac Izačić (IV)	3-2
Ključ (III)	Krajišnik VelikaKladuša (IV)	1-0
Mutnica Pjanići (IV)	Kamenica (IV)	2-1
Omladinac Sanica (IV)	Bajer 99 Velagići (IV)	4-2
Una NP Kulen Vakuf (III)	Mladost Vrnograč (III)	bye
Vitez Bužim (III)	Bratstvo Bosanska Krupa (III)	bye
Krajina Cazin (III)	Sloga 1937 Kralje (IV)	4-0

Mladost and Bratstvo failed to show up to game, Una NP and Vitez received a bye to next round respectively

==== Second round ====
Played on 8 April 2015

Home team	Away team	Result
Željezničar B. Krupa (IV)	Krajina Cazin (III)	1-4
Sloga Bosanska Otoka (III)	Vitez Bužim (III)	1-0
Brekovica 78 (IV)	Una NP Kulen Vakuf (III)	bye
Gomila Stijena (IV)	Omladinac Sanica (IV)	0-4
Ključ (III)	Mutnica Pjanići (IV)	3-1

Una NP failed to show up to game, Brekovica 78 received a bye to next round

==== Third round ====
Played on 22 April 2015

Home team	Away team	Result
Sloga Bosanska Otoka (III)	Ključ (III)	4-2
Brekovica 78 (IV)	Omladinac Sanica (IV)	1-1 (11-10 p)

Krajina Cazin bye to next round

==== Fourth round ====
Played on 6 May 2015

Home team	Away team	Result
Sloga Bosanska Otoka (III)	Krajina Cazin (III)	2-0

Brekovica 78 bye to next round

==== Final ====
Played on 20 May 2015; in Pjanići (neutral ground)

Home team	Away team	Result
Sloga Bosanska Otoka (III)	Brekovica 78 (IV)	2-0

=== Posavina Canton ===
Statistics is shown in table below:

Teams took part
Matches played
Goals scored

=== Tuzla Canton ===
Statistics is shown in table below:

Teams took part	31 (+1 forfeited)
Matches played	27
Goals scored	95

==== First round ====
Played on 22 April 2015

Home team	Away team	Result
Mladost 78 Vukovije (V)	Sloga Simin Han (III)	0-0 (3-4 p)
Mladost Solina (V)	Prokosovići (III)	4-2
Doboj-Istok (IV)	Mladost Malešići (III)	0-3
Omladinac Đurđevik (VI)	Sloga Tojšići (III)	3-1
Konjuh Kladanj (VI)	Priluk (III)	1-2
Lokomotiva Miričina (IV)	Mramor (III)	2-2 (8-7 p)
Trešnjevka Maoča (IV)	Bosna Mionica (III)	1-1 (6-7 p)
Vrana Banovići Selo (V)	Slaven Živinice (III)	1-0
Metalac Živinice (VI)	Bosna Kalesija (III)	2-1
Biberovo Polje (V)	Ingram Duboki Potok (III)	5-4
Seona (IV)	Radnik Lipnica (III)	2-0
Polet Palanka (V)	Svatovac Poljice (IV)	2-4
Jedinstvo Vučkovci (IV)	Rudar Bukinje (III)	bye
Tuzla (V)	Mladost Puračić (III)	1-2
Sladna (V)	DSK Devetak (IV)	1-1 (4-5 p)
Jedinstvo Lukavica (V)	Mladost Kikači (IV)	1-0

Rudar forfeited

==== Second round ====
Played on 6 May 2015

Home team	Away team	Result
Seona (IV)	Biberovo Polje (V)	6-0
Jedinstvo Vučkovci (IV)	Bosna Mionica (III)	2-5
Svatovac Poljice (IV)	Mladost Puračić (III)	2-0
Mladost Solina (V)	Sloga Simin Han (III)	2-1
Lokomotiva Miričina (IV)	Mladost Malešići (III)	0-3
Omladinac Đurđevik (VI)	Vrana Banovići Selo (V)	2-0
Priluk (III)	Metalac Živinice (VI)	1-0
DSK Devetak (IV)	Jedinstvo Lukavica (V)	3-1

==== Second round ====
Played on 19 and 20 May 2015

Home team	Away team	Result
Omladinac Đurđevik (VI)	Priluk (III)	1-2
Seona (IV)	Bosna Mionica (III)	2-0
Mladost Malešići (III)	Mladost Solina (V)	5-2
Svatovac Poljice (IV)	DSK Devetak (IV)	5-1

=== Zenica-Doboj Canton ===
Statistics is shown in table below:

Teams took part	12 (+5 forfeited)
Matches played	10
Goals scored	45

==== First round ====
Played on 6 May 2015

Home team	Away team	Result
Žepče (IV)	Nemila (IV)	3-1
Napredak Šije (IV)	Gradina Doboj-Jug (IV)	bye
Proleter Makljenovac (IV)	Vis Kosova (IV)	4-3
Kosmos Visoko (IV)	Borac Tetovo (IV)	bye

Gradina and Borac failed to show up to game, Napredak and Kosmos received bye to next round respectively

==== Second round ====
Played on 13 May 2015

Home team	Away team	Result
Kosmos Visoko (IV)	Bosna Visoko (III)	1-4
Pobjeda Tešanjka (III)	Usora (III)	1-5
Napredak Šije (IV)	Natron Maglaj (III)	3-3 (4-2 p)
Žepče (IV)	Borac Jelah (III)	2-0
Rudar Zenica (III)	Krivaja Zavidovići (III)	bye
Stupčanica Olovo (III)	Rudar Breza (III)	bye
Proleter Makljenovac (IV)	TOŠK Tešanj (III)	0-2

Krivaja and Stupčanica forfeited, Rudar and Rudar received a bye to next round respectively

==== Quarter final ====
Played on 20 May 2015

Home team	Away team	Result
Usora (III)	Žepče (IV)	3-4
Napredak Šije (IV)	TOŠK Tešanj (III)	1-1 (3-4 p)
Rudar Breza (III)	Bosna Visoko (III)	bye

Rudar Zenica bye to next round
Rudar Breza forfeited, Bosna received a bye to next round

==== Semi final ====
Played on 3 June 2015

Home team	Away team	Result
Žepče (IV)	Bosna Visoko (III)	bye
TOŠK Tešanj (III)	Rudar Zenica (III)	3-1

Bosna forfeited

==== Final ====
Played on 9 June 2015

Home team	Away team	Result
Žepče (IV)	TOŠK Tešanj (III)	

=== Bosnian-Podrinje Canton ===
Statistics is shown in table below:

Teams took part
Matches played
Goals scored

=== Central Bosnia Canton ===
Statistics is shown in table below:

Teams took part
Matches played
Goals scored

==== First round ====
Played on 20 May 2015

Home team	Away team	Result
Kiseljak (IV)	Kaćuni (V)	
Kreševo (IV)	Bilalovac CPU (V)	
Rijeka (IV)	Gorica Guča Gora (IV)	
Karaula (V)	Metalleghe-BSI Jajce B (V)	
Busovača (IV)	Šantići (V)	
Fojnica (IV)	Lugovi (V)	
Elektrobosna Jajce (V)	Radnik Donji Vakuf (IV)	
Mladost Nević Polje (IV)	Rudar Han-Bila (IV)	

=== Herzegovina-Neretva Canton ===
Statistics is shown in table below:

Teams took part
Matches played
Goals scored

=== West Herzegovina Canton ===
Statistics is shown in table below:

Teams took part
Matches played
Goals scored

=== Sarajevo Canton ===
Statistics is shown in table below:

Teams took part	
Matches played	2
Goals scored	6

==== First round ====
Played on 13 May 2015

Home team	Away team	Result
Sporta Sarajevo (IV)	Ozren Semizovac (IV)	-
Ilijaš (III)	Mladost Župča (III)	4-0
Radnik Hadžići (III)	Bosna Sema Sarajevo (IV)	0-2

=== Canton 10 ===
Statistics is shown in table below:

Teams took part
Matches played
Goals scored

=== Combined statistics ===
As of 13 May 2015

Teams took part	
Teams forfeited	
Matches played	46
Goals scored	164
Biggest win	
Most goals in a match	

== Federation of Bosnia and Herzegovina Cup ==
Statistics is shown in table below:

Teams took part
Matches played
Goals scored
