= Dalibor Nedić =

Bosnian footballer

Personal information
- Full name: Dalibor Nedić
- Date of birth: 10 November 1974 (age 51)
- Place of birth: Sarajevo, SFR Yugoslavia
- Position: Defender

Senior career*
Years	Team	Apps	(Gls)
1995–1996	Olimpik	22	(0)
1998–2000	Rudar Kakanj	50	(0)
2000–2001	Brotnjo	27	(0)
2002-2003	Zadar	30	(2)
2003–2004	Čelik Zenica	34	(1)
2005	Sarajevo	3	(0)
2006-2009	Víkingur Ólafsvík	80	(0)
2010	BÍ/Bolungarvík	20	(2)
2011	SAŠK Napredak		

International career^{‡}
1999-2001	Bosnia and Herzegovina	6	(0)
2001	Bosnia and Herzegovina XI	2	(0)
- * Club domestic league appearances and goals ‡ National team caps and goals as of 19 June 2021

Dalibor Nedić (born 10 November 1974) is a Bosnian retired football player.

== Club career ==
He had a 5-year spell in Iceland, with second tier Víkingur Ólafsvík and third tier BÍ/Bolungarvík.

== International career ==
Nedić made his debut for Bosnia and Herzegovina in a January 1999 friendly match away against Malta and has earned a total of 8 caps (2 unofficial), scoring no goals. His final international was a January 2001 Millennium Super Soccer Cup match against Serbia and Montenegro.
