= 2015–16 Bosnia and Herzegovina Football Cup =

Tournament details
- Country: Bosnia and Herzegovina
- Teams: 32

Final positions
- Champions: Radnik Bijeljina (1st title)
- Runners-up: Sloboda Tuzla

Tournament statistics
- Matches played: 44
- Goals scored: 132 (3 per match)

The 2015–16 Bosnia and Herzegovina Football Cup was the twentieth season of Bosnia and Herzegovina's annual football cup, and a sixteenth season of the unified competition. The winner qualified to the first qualifying round of the 2016–17 UEFA Europa League.

Olimpic Sarajevo is the title holder, having won their first national cup title previous season.

== Qualification ==
32 teams take part in the Cup. Berths allocation is shown below:

- 16 teams from the Premier League of Bosnia and Herzegovina,
- 10 teams from Federation of Bosnia and Herzegovina Cup,
- 6 teams from the Republika Srpska Cup.

== Participating teams ==
Following teams will take part in 2015–16 Bosnia and Herzegovina Football Cup.

2015–16 Premier League	2015–16 Federation of BiH Cup	2015–16 Republika Srpska Cup
Olimpic Sarajevo ^{title holder}; Borac Banja Luka; Čelik Zenica; Drina Zvornik; Mladost DK; Radnik Bijeljina; Rudar Prijedor; Sarajevo; Slavija Istočno Sarajevo; Sloboda Tuzla; Široki Brijeg; Travnik; Velež Mostar; Vitez; Zrinjski Mostar; Željezničar Sarajevo	First League of the FBiH (II): Bratstvo Gračanica; Čapljina; Goražde; GOŠK Gabela; Novi Travnik; Orašje; Radnički Lukavac; Rudar Kakanj; Sloga Ljubuški; Second League of the FBiH (III): TOŠK Tešanj (group Center)	First League of the RS (II): Krupa; Mladost Velika Obarska; Sloboda Novi Grad; Second League of the RS (III): Mladost Gacko; Modriča; Rudar Ugljevik

Roman number in brackets denote the level of respective league in Bosnian football league system

== Calendar ==
Round	Date(s)	Teams	Goals / games
1st Round	23 September 2015	32 → 16	42 / 16
2nd Round	21 October 2015 (leg 1); 4 November 2015 (leg 2)	16 → 8	23 / 8
Quarter final	9 March 2016 (leg 1); 16 March 2016 (leg 2)	8 → 4	19 / 8
Semi final	13 April 2016 (leg 1); 20 April 2016 (leg 2)	4 → 2	11 / 4
Final	TBD (leg 1); TBD (leg 2)	2 → 1	5 / 2

== First round ==
This round consisted of 16 single-legged fixtures. All 32 clubs entered the competition from this round, while the matches were scheduled for 23 September 2015, with three match on 22 September. In a case of a draw in the regular time, the winner was determined with a penalty shootout.

Home team	Away team	Result
Mladost Doboj Kakanj (I)	Čapljina (II)	2–0
Slavija Istočno Sarajevo (I)	Rudar Ugljevik (III)	4–0
Radnički Lukavac (II)	Olimpic Sarajevo (I)	2–1
Modriča (III)	GOŠK Gabela (II)	1–1 (5–6 p)
Goražde (II)	Sloboda Tuzla (I)	0–2
Čelik Zenica (I)	Vitez (I)	1–0
Drina Zvornik (I)	Bratstvo Gračanica (II)	0–1
Novi Travnik (II)	Travnik (I)	1–5
Željezničar Sarajevo (I)	Krupa (II)	1–0
Široki Brijeg (I)	Rudar Prijedor (I)	5–0
Orašje (II)	TOŠK Tešanj (III)	3–2
Radnik Bijeljina (I)	Mladost Velika Obarska (II)	3–0
Zrinjski Mostar (I)	Sarajevo (I)	1–1 (5–6 p)
Velež Mostar (I)	Sloboda Novi Grad (II)	0–1
Mladost Gacko (III)	Borac Banja Luka (I)	0–1
Rudar Kakanj (II)	Sloga Ljubuški (II)	2–0

== Second round ==
The 16 winners continued their way to the final through this round. Unlike the last round, this round consisted of 8 two-legged fixtures. The dates for the matches were determined with the draw which was held on 15 October, while the matches took place on 21 October (first legs) and 4 November 2015 (second legs).

Team 1	Team 2	Leg 1	Leg 2	Agg. score
Sloboda Novi Grad (II)	Mladost Doboj Kakanj (I)	2–1	0–7	2–8
Borac Banja Luka (I)	Bratstvo Gračanica (II)	1–0	2–0	3–0
Čelik Zenica (I)	Sloboda Tuzla (I)	1–1	1–2	2–3
Travnik (I)	Radnički Lukavac (II)	0–2	0–0	0–2
Rudar Kakanj (II)	Radnik Bijeljina (I)	1–3	1–7	2–10
Željezničar Sarajevo (I)	GOŠK Gabela (II)	3–0	1–0	4–0
Orašje (II)	Široki Brijeg (I)	0–3	0–6	0–9
Slavija Istočno Sarajevo (I)	Sarajevo (I)	1–4	1–3	2–7

== Quarter final ==
Played on 9 and 15 March 2016; over two legs

Team 1	Team 2	Leg 1	Leg 2	Agg. score
Radnički Lukavac (II)	Radnik Bijeljina (I)	0–2	1–1	1–3
Široki Brijeg (I)	Mladost Doboj Kakanj (I)	3–1	0–1	3–2
Borac Banja Luka (I)	Željezničar Sarajevo (I)	0–2	1–2	1–4
Sloboda Tuzla (I)	Sarajevo (I)	2–1	3–0	5–1

== Semi final ==
Played on 13 and 20 April 2016; over two legs.

Team 1	Team 2	Leg 1	Leg 2	Agg. score
Radnik Bijeljina (I)	Široki Brijeg (I)	1–0	1–2	2–2 (a)
Željezničar Sarajevo (I)	Sloboda Tuzla (I)	1–2	1–3	2–5

== Final ==
The final is played over 2 legs. The first match has been played on 11 May 2016, the second one will be played on 18 May 2016.

Team 1	Team 2	Leg 1	Leg 2	Agg. score
Sloboda Tuzla (I)	Radnik Bijeljina (I)	1–1	0–3	1–4

=== First leg ===
11 May 2016
20:00

Sloboda Tuzla	1–1	Radnik Bijeljina
Merzić 37'		Jakovljević 55'

Stadion Tušanj, Tuzla
Referee: Admir Šehović

=== Second leg ===
18 May 2016
17:00

Radnik Bijeljina	3–0	Sloboda Tuzla
Hodžić 5'; Memišević 64', 87'

Gradski stadion, Bijeljina
Referee: Ognjen Valjić

Radnik Bijeljina won 4–1 in aggregate.
