= Otoka, Sarajevo =

Neighbourhood in Sarajevo, Bosnia and Herzegovina

Otoka Отока
- Neighbourhood
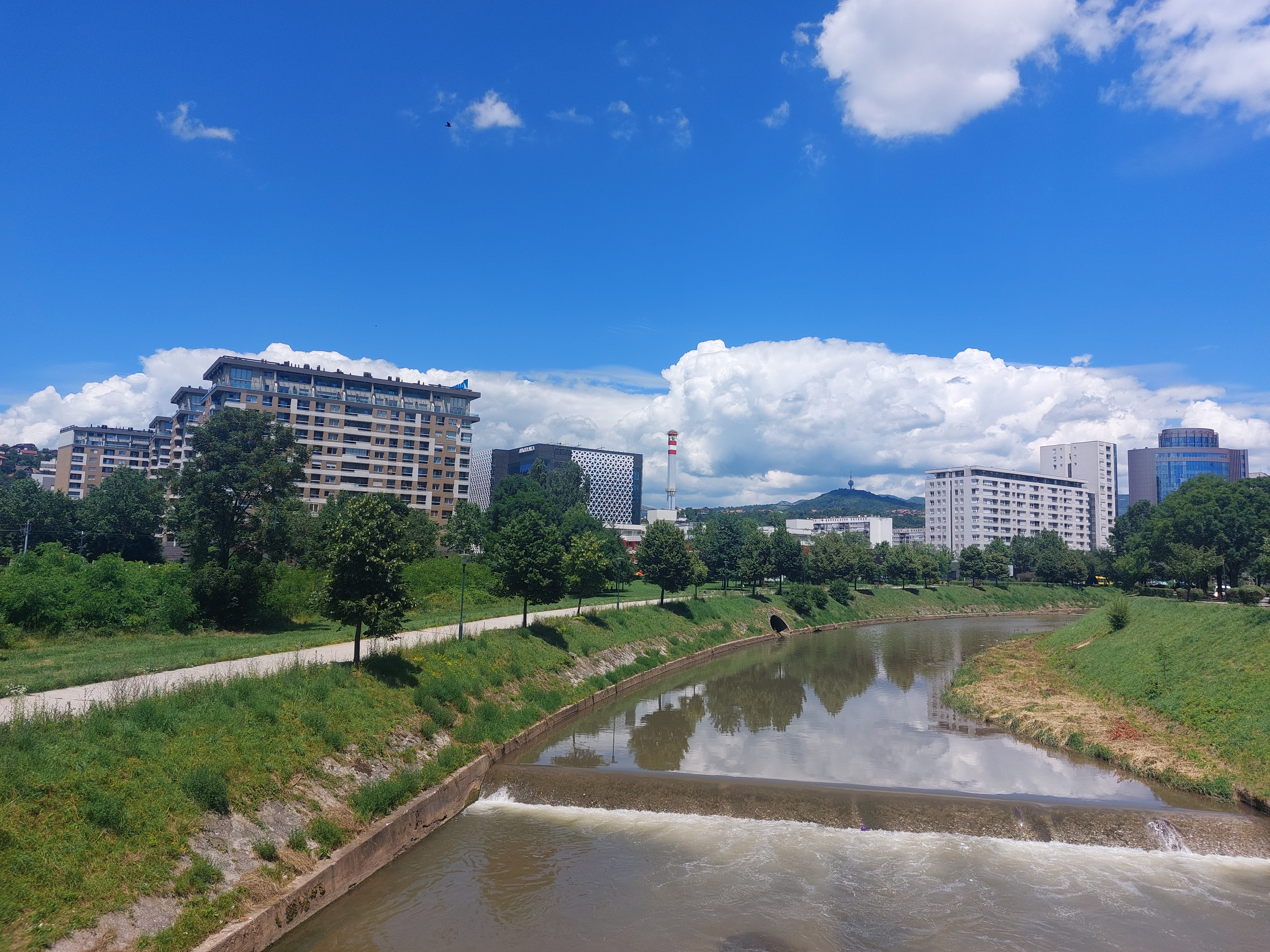
- Nova Otoka in July 2023

- Location within Sarajevo
- Coordinates: 43°50′50.11″N 18°21′54.13″E
- Country: Bosnia and Herzegovina
- Entity: Federation of Bosnia and Herzegovina
- Canton: Sarajevo_Canton
- Municipality: Novi_Grad,_Sarajevo
- Time zone: UTC+1 (CET)
  - Summer (DST): UTC+2 (CEST)

Otoka (Cyrillic: Отока) is a part of Novi Grad, Sarajevo, Bosnia and Herzegovina, located within the Federation of Bosnia and Herzegovina. It shares borders with the following neighborhoods: Čengić vila (East side), Aneks (South-East side), Švrakino Selo (South side). Its residential core represents a chain of high-rise buildings (Streets: Žrtava Fašizma, Brčanska, Aleja Lipa).

The apartment complex was built by the government in the early 1970s and for a long time stood as most prominent and cleanest part of Sarajevo suburbia. The design was advanced for the time with significant green parks areas, preschool, elementary school and shopping all available within the complex. The vehicle traffic was routed with local streets designed in a ring fashion around the complex which contributed to a safer environment overall.

== Sports ==
Otoka was home to FK Olimpik football club, before its dissolution in 2021. The stadium is located within the sports complex that includes both Otoka Stadium and Sarajevo Olympic pool; a home ground of Bosnia and Herzegovina men's national water polo team.
