= HNK Grude =

- Full name: Hrvatski nogometni klub Grude
- Founded: 1959; 66 years ago
- Ground: Stadion Elić Luka, Grude
- Capacity: 2000
- Manager: Mario Knezović
- League: Second League FBiH - South
- 2020–21: 5th
Home colours	Away colours

HNK Grude (Croatian: Hrvatski nogometni klub Grude, lit. 'Croatian Football Club Grude') is a professional football club, based in Grude, Bosnia and Herzegovina. The club plays in the Second League of the Federation of Bosnia and Herzegovina.

== History ==
=== Foundation of NK Bekija (1959-1999) ===
HNK Grude was founded in 1959 as NK Bekija (Croatian: Nogometni klub Bekija; English: Football Club Bekija) by the members of youth sports organization Bekija the club's first official game was against Mladost in 1959.

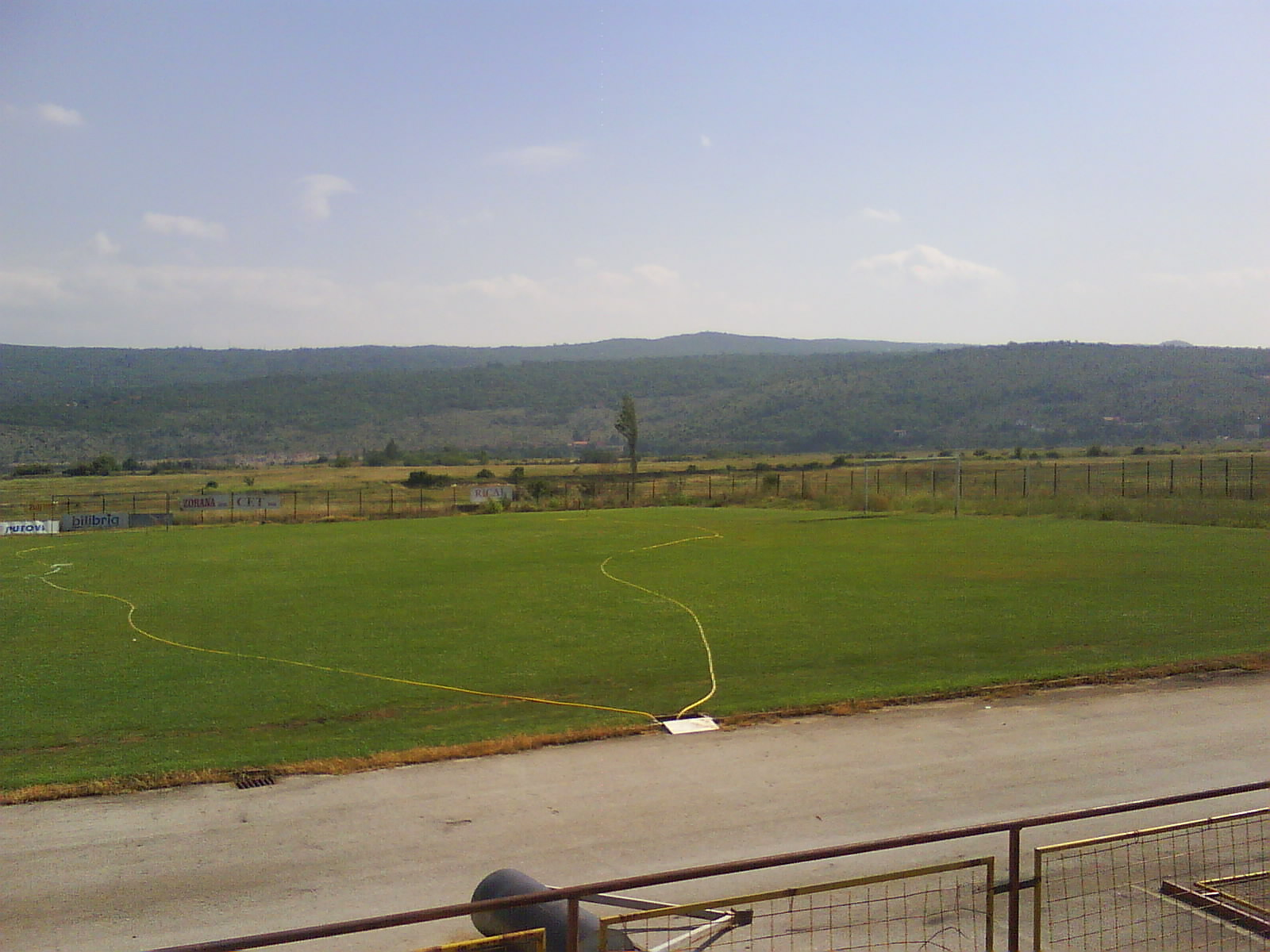
Elić Luka Stadium

=== HNK Grude era (1999-present) ===
In 1999 after a meeting in Hotel Grude, the club was renamed as (Croatian: Hrvatski nogometni klub Grude; English: Croat Sports Club Grude) In 2009 HNK Grude celebrated 50 years of foundation with a friendly match against GNK Dinamo Zagreb. HNK Grude is the oldest sports club in Grude. They spent one season at Bosnia and Hercegovina's highest level, in 2001–02.

== Honours ==
=== Domestic ===
==== League ====
- First League of the Federation of Bosnia and Herzegovina:
  - Winners (1): 2000–01

== Club seasons ==
Season	League									Cup	Europe
Season	Division	P	W	D	L	F	A	Pts	Pos	Cup	Europe
2000–01	First League of FBiH	32	23	3	6	52	18	72	1st ↑		
2001–02	Premier League of Bosnia and Herzegovina	30	8	7	15	23	43	31	15th ↓		
2002–03	First League of FBiH	36	16	5	15	48	52	53	9th		
2003–04	First League of FBiH	30	12	2	16	24	58	38	15th ↓		
2016–17	Second League of FBiH – South	28	9	5	14	41	41	32	10th		
2017–18	Second League of FBiH – South	28	11	5	12	40	49	38	7th		
2018–19	Second League of FBiH – South	26	5	6	15	29	46	21	12th		
2019–20	Second League of FBiH – South	14	3	1	10	15	40	10	14th		
2020–21	Second League of FBiH – South	24	14	1	9	35	28	43	5th		
