= Muamer Jahić =

Bosnian footballer

Personal information
- Full name: Muamer Jahić
- Date of birth: 1 December 1979 (age 46)
- Place of birth: Srebrenica, SFR Yugoslavia
- Position: Midfielder

Senior career*
Years	Team	Apps	(Gls)
1995–1996	Željezničar	16	(0)
1996-2002	Olimpik	71+	(7+)
2002–2004	Bosna Visoko		

International career^{‡}
2001	Bosnia and Herzegovina	1	(0)
2001	Bosnia and Herzegovina XI	1	(0)
- * Club domestic league appearances and goals ‡ National team caps and goals as of 19 June 2021

Muamer Jahić (born 1 December 1979) is a Bosnian retired football player.

== Club career ==
He was part of the Željezničar Sarajevo squad during the 1995/96 season and he later won promotion to Bosnia's top tier with Olimpik.

== International career ==
He made two appearances for Bosnia and Herzegovina at the August 2001 LG Cup, an unofficial match against South Africa and an official international match against Iran.
