= 2001–02 First League of the Republika Srpska =

Season of the First League of the Republika Srpska

This page details the statistics of the First League of the Republika Srpska in the 2001–02 season.

At the end of the season, the top six clubs joined the Premier League of Bosnia and Herzegovina, to form the first nationwide football league of Bosnia and Herzegovina.

== Clubs and stadiums ==
Location of clubs in 1st League of RS 2001-02

== League standings ==
Pos	Team	Pld	W	D	L	GF	GA	GD	Pts	Qualification
1	Leotar (C, Q)	30	20	2	8	67	25	+42	62	Qualification for Premijer Liga BiH
2	Kozara (Q)	30	17	5	8	58	35	+23	56	Qualification for Premijer Liga BiH
3	Borac Banja Luka (Q)	30	16	7	7	45	25	+20	55	Qualification for Premijer Liga BiH
4	Glasinac (Q)	30	17	3	10	49	39	+10	54	Qualification for Premijer Liga BiH
5	Mladost Gacko (Q)	30	16	4	10	45	29	+16	52	Qualification for Premijer Liga BiH
6	Rudar Ugljevik (Q)	30	14	8	8	38	31	+7	50	Qualification for Premijer Liga BiH
7	Slavija	30	13	5	12	35	40	−5	44	
8	Ljubić	30	12	6	12	34	26	+8	42	
9	Modriča	30	11	7	12	31	38	−7	40	
10	Omladinac	30	11	6	13	40	40	0	39	
11	Radnik	30	12	1	17	33	43	−10	37	
12	Boksit	30	10	6	14	41	43	−2	36	
13	Sloboda Novi Grad	30	10	5	15	25	49	−24	35	
14	Polet	30	9	2	19	28	56	−28	29	
15	BSK	30	7	7	16	29	45	−16	28	
16	Jedinstvo Brčko	30	6	4	20	25	59	−34	22	

Source: BIHSoccer.com, RSSSF.org
Rules for classification: 1) points; 2) goal difference; 3) number of goals scored.
(C) Champions; (Q) Qualified for the phase indicated

== See also ==
- 2001–02 Premier League of Bosnia and Herzegovina
