= Nijaz Gracić =

Bosnian football administrator (1960–2026)

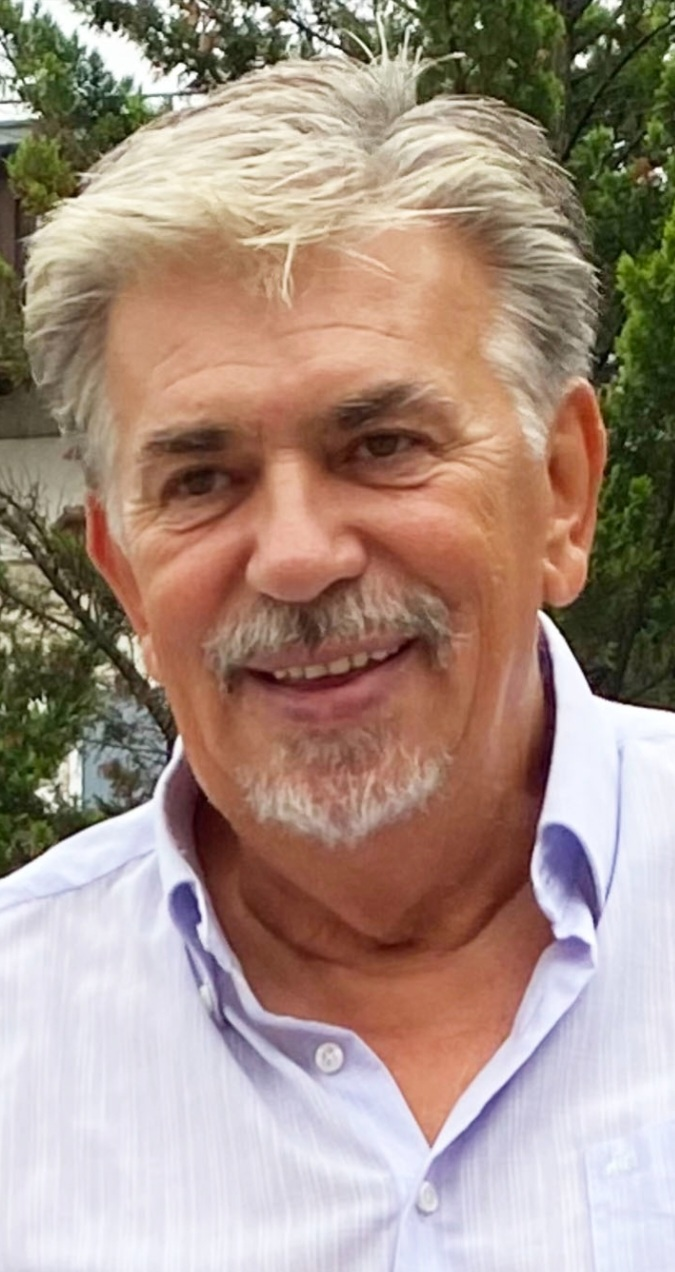

30th President of the Assembly of FK Sarajevo
- In office 18 February 2004 – 6 January 2005

6th chairman of FK Olimpik
- In office 9 June 2006 – 27 May 2016

Personal details
- Born: 3 July 1960 Sarajevo, PR Bosnia and Herzegovina, FPR Yugoslavia
- Died: 6 April 2026 (aged 65) Thessaloniki, Greece
- Profession: Businessman, football administrator

Nijaz Gracić (3 July 1960 – 6 April 2026) was a Bosnian businessman and football administrator who played a significant role in the development of football in Bosnia and Herzegovina. He was the owner of the marketing company Europlakat BH. which is one of the leading outdoor advertising companies in Bosnia and Herzegovina.

Gracić served as the 30th president of the assembly of Bosnian Premier League club FK Sarajevo and as the sixth chairman of First League of FBiH club FK Olimpik Sarajevo.

He was born in Sarajevo, Bosnia and Herzegovina.

Gracić died in Thessaloniki, Greece, on 6 April 2026, at the age of 65.
