= FK Olimpik =

Current amateur club in Bosnia and Herzegovina

Olimpik Sarajevo
- Full name: Fudbalski klub Olimpik Sarajevo
- Nickname: Vukovi (The Wolves)
- Founded: 3 October 1993
- Dissolved: 2021
- Ground: Stadion Otoka
- 2020–21: Bosnian Premier League, 12th (relegated)
Home colours	Away colours

Fudbalski klub Olimpik Sarajevo (lit. 'Football Club Olimpik Sarajevo') was a professional football club from Sarajevo, based in the Otoka neighbourhood. Being one of the first teams to be formed in independent Bosnia and Herzegovina, they joined the country's top division, the Premier League of Bosnia and Herzegovina, upon its inception in 1993. After the 2016–17 season, they were relegated into the First League of the Federation of Bosnia and Herzegovina, the country's second-tier league, where they played until the 2019–20 season, before getting promoted back to the Premier League. The club was dissolved in 2021.

Olimpik's only major trophy came in the 2014–15 season, when the club beat Široki Brijeg to win the Bosnian Cup.

== History ==
=== Early years ===
Olimpik was formed amidst the Bosnian War on 3 October 1993 in Sarajevo. Figures associated with the club in its early days included Ramiz Krilašević, brothers Šefkija and Edhem Okerić, Mustafa Ruvić, Suad Osmanagić and Sakib Trtić, who between themselves organised equipment and kits for training. The club's first manager was Slobodan Rajević., and early players included Kolar, Demirović, Subašić, Sužnjević, Ahmetagić, Muhović, Toromanović, Memišević, Tozo, Ćurt, Babić, Dogan, Salman, Smajović.

The team managed to win the Asim Ferhatović "Hase" Memorial Cup in futsal in 1993. Later that year, regional competitions for membership of the Bosnian and Herzegovinian football leagues were played. Olimpik participated in the Sarajevo Canton, and were advanced to the next tier, after playing a total of 8 matches and scoring 28 goals while conceding only 1. In 1994, the team competed in the next tier within the Tuzla inter-cantonal group, where they met opponents such as Sloboda (Tuzla), Gradina (Srebrenik), Turbina (Jablanica), Natron (Maglaj) and Travnik (Travnik). Olimpik finished as runners-up and thereby guaranteed themselves a place in the new First League of Bosnia and Herzegovina, organised by the Football Association of Bosnia and Herzegovina.Around this time, the team also won the War Olympiad in Tuzla.

=== Post-war period ===
The 1995–96 season saw the team play in the First League of Bosnia and Herzegovina, but they were relegated at the end of the season. The team alternated between promotion and relegation for several years. During this time, the club brought through several future Bosnia and Herzegovina national team players.

Well-known post-war Olimpik players have included Almedin Hota, Zajko Zeba, Samir Muratović, Munever Rizvić, Šopović, the brothers Dalibor and Miodrag Nedić, Muamer Vukas, Muamer Jahić and Sead Bučan.

=== Olimpik in the merged league ===
During the seasons of 2000–01 and 2001–02 will remain in the history of the club as some of the most successful. The team managed in those two seasons, led by the trainers Boris Bračulj and after him Jusuf Čizmić, to carve out a spot in the newly merged league with the previous First league of Herceg Bosna, in which the team competed with a force equal to many other clubs who competed with them there, and in the last round of the season 2000–01 with a win against FK Sarajevo and the goals made by Gredić and Cerić, made sure they would remain in the elite for another year. The team consisted of the following players at the time: Alen Krak, Dženan Uščuplić, Almir Seferović, Nihad Suljević, Nihad Alić, Muamer Jahić, Samir Mekić, Emir Obuća, Almir Gredić, Tarik Cerić, Aner Ljeljak, Sead Bučan, Zajko Zeba, Elvir Ljubunčić, Ahmed Hadžispahić, Hasanović and Edis Čindrak. After the successful run to remain in the league, the team was relegated the following year, and in that moment difficult times came upon the club. What was stated earlier was being iterated again, that the club did not have a strategy nor vision of development and even if it had a good quality at the time for competition in the Bosnian top league, simply experienced relegation.

=== On the edge of existence ===
Namely from the season of 2002–03 until the season of 2006–07 the club was being abandoned, almost to the point of being left to its own devices completely, and was at the brink of existence. The club kept falling all the further down so that at one point the survival of the club was being questioned. The club first fell into the First League of the Federation of Bosnia and Herzegovina so that it would later fall into the Second League of the Federation of Bosnia and Herzegovina – Center. Alongside the club remained only a handful of enthusiasts who would not allow the club to be shut down. Damir Hadžić as the district head of the municipality Novi Grad helped the club as much as he possibly could as well as people like Kolar, Spahić, Trtić, and the occasional person who would show up every now and then to help the club within the limits of their ability. Players who played for the club then were young men who were looking for affirmation or some old players who found their refuge in Olimpik. Timkov, Čakić, Močević, Kapetanović, Janjoš, Đuderija, Fatić, Garčević, Dudo, Derviši, Murtić, Ortaš, Suković, Šabotić, Kaljanac, Dević, Šišić, Kaljić, Imširović are just some of the players who wore the jersey of Olimpik back then. Throughout this entire dark stage Kolar has been with the team as head of the coaching staff even if at times Asim Saračević and Samir Jahić would take the lead.

=== New horizons ===
The season of 2006–07 the trainer Kolar starts off with the junior team at the start of the season. In the 8th round in the position of the president of the club comes Nijaz Gracić, a prominent businessman, and former president of FK Sarajevo, who starts to organize the club with the clear goal of entrance into the Premier League by his extended experience of organization from leading a company and the experience from Koševo. Even if many at that moment pronounced him to be Don Quixote in the struggle against windmills, mr. Gracić rolled up his sleeves and started slowly sorting the mosaic tiles with his collaborators. The first thing that was important was that the club had huge debts to former and contemporary employees which they needed to solve, the club did not have a stadium neither for training nor for playing matches, and they did not even have kits; the club was unintelligibly "deep in the negative". Halfway into the season a few experienced players come in who made up the backbone of the team. Due to the bad start of the team, with only 3 points away from the first place that year, the team does not manage to place themselves in the First League of the Federation of Bosnia and Herzegovina, during which Ozren leaves the club. The players which were carriers of the game that year were: Bećirović, Žerić, Garčević, Radonja, Smječanin, Redžović, Makić, Toromanović, Kapetanović and Timkov.

At the end of the season, the team eventually takes second spot but the goal of the president and the employees of the club for the season of 2007–08 remains the same: a place in the First League of Bosnia and Herzegovina. Led by Faik Kolar with players who were added and Haznadar, Hondo, Sikima, Bubalo, Mešetović, Majčić and Ferhatović already in the autumn half of the season almost ensured a place in the FBiH. At the end of the season the team conquers a formidable first place with 17 points ahead of the second-placed team. All club segments were lifted onto a higher level and the club has solved the question of training and playing matches, solved the concern about the kits, the players were now receiving their wages on a regular basis and in the season of 2008–09 went ahead to tackle the goal called: the Premier League.

=== Campaign for Europe ===
In the season of 2010–11, Olimpik barely missed the spot for the qualifying phase of Europe League, finishing 5th place in the league. In the subsequent season of 2011–12 they did not play up to par in their first two matches (they had one draw and one loss, although being candidates for one of the top places of the table) of the championship, resulting in a mutual agreement between the club and manager for a managerial change, with Mehmed Janjoš being replaced by his assistant, Nedim Jusufbegović. He continued to lead the team on to land on the same 5th place in the league as they did last year, but this time even closer to Europe than before, only two points away, and a goal difference far superior to 13 out of the other 15 clubs participating in the Premier League. The following year in 2012–13 started out with two draws against two weaker teams, namely OFK Gradina Srebrenik and FK Rudar Prijedor, as well as a bare victory against another weak team GOSK Gabela, and a loss against FK Sarajevo. Therefore, Jusufbegović was replaced in September 2012 by Husref Musemić who led the team throughout a successful campaign helping the team insure a confident third place right up until after the winter break when FK Sarajevo placed an offer on the table for the manager, and so Denis Sadiković was appointed in February as manager, whose start was somewhat better than Jusufbegović's, but after a series of unsuccessful games and the team's slow demise, he was replaced with Nedim Jusufbegović.

The third time the coach returned to the team he is currently coaching, he was a mere victory away from landing the team a spot for European competition, but fell in the very last match, and stuck to a well-deserved finish at the by-now traditional 5th position on the table for Olimpik. Part of what caused the club not to do better than they did last year could be blamed on one of the matches against FK Velež Mostar which resulted in a 1–1 draw, where the referee Eldis Prošić's decisions were questionable, and caused a lot of irritation among Olimpik's players, the manager as well as the fans. However this was not the first time Olimpik has been dealt with unfairly, within the first half of the season of 2012–13, there were complaints about at least another four games where allegedly it has been suspected that the team was being intentionally given incorrect refereeing decisions. Due to this, the team has been on the verge to opt out of the league altogether, much like FK Borac Banja Luka's own situation at the end of the season where complaints came aimed at the national association from several clubs. The teams between third and eighth position were all refused an UEFA license for participation in Europa League 2013–14, save for NK Široki Brijeg, and in the end HŠK Zrinjski Mostar were the ones to receive the final spot for the competition.

== Colours and badge ==
FK Olimpik Sarajevo's colours are a dark shade of green coupled with white, although the jerseys which the players have are sometimes made in a third color, namely gold.

The badge is composed of two shapes merged; the top is similar to the top of a diamond, while the bottom is a circle, and the first is put on top of the second to form the shape of the badge. There are four vertical white stripes on the badge, and between them are three stripes of everglade green. Amidst the three middle stripes, at the round bottom section of the shape of the badge is a football, and across it is the text "Olimpik" beneath which is a smaller text spelling out "Sarajevo". Underneath the ball, between the edge of it and the edge of the shape is the number 1993 (the year the club was founded). The numbers and the letters in the badge are all in everglade green like the middle stripes, but with a white border. Above the ball and the text are two shapes of a wolf howling.

== Name ==
The idea to name the club Olimpik came from the fact that city of Sarajevo was the host city to the 1984 Winter Olympics. Olimpik's nickname The Wolves is also linked to the 1984 Winter Olympics by way of the Olympics' mascot Vučko (Wolfie; pronounced in Bosnian: "vooch-ko").

From September 2010, until December 2016, the official name of the club was Olimpic, with the letter C instead of the letter K.

== Stadium ==
Olimpik play their home games at Stadion Otoka, a 3,000-seat venue located in the Otoka neighborhood of Sarajevo.

For the 2009–10 season, Olimpik planned to host home games at the Asim Ferhatović Hase Stadium while their home ground went through a $5 million modernization which would satisfy UEFA regulations and increase the capacity from 3,000 to 9,000 seats. Moreover, three tiers were planned to provide the area for the 9,000 seats, and artificial grass was planned as well. However, Olimpik played their home games at Stadion Grbavica instead.

Ultimately the big 2010 renovation never happened, except the one in 2011, when the stands and the pitch were renovated. Since then, the stadium has stayed in that condition ever since, with minor renovations just to meet the Football Association of Bosnia and Herzegovina standards.

Stadion Otoka was fully renovated during the summer of 2024. The renovation was fully supported by the Municipality of Novi Grad Sarajevo. Currently Stadion Otoka is being used by a newly formed team OFK Olimpik Novi Grad.

== Kit manufacturers ==
Period	Kit Provider	Shirt Sponsor
2010–2011	Givova	Europlakat
2011–2012	Jako	Europlakat
2012–2014	NAAI	Europlakat
2014–2015	Givova	Europlakat
2015–2017	Puma	Europlakat
2017–2021	GBT	/

== Club seasons ==
Season	League										Cup	Europe
Season	Division	League Tier	P	W	D	L	F	A	Pts	Pos	Cup	Europe
1993–94*	Sarajevo Canton League	1	8	8	0	0	28	1	24	1st ↑	N/A	N/A
1994–95*	First League of BiH	1	4	2	1	1	5	7	7	3rd	N/A	N/A
1995–96	First League of BiH	1	30	5	5	20	27	57	20	15th↓	N/A	N/A
1996–97	Second League of BiH – South	2	26	17	4	5	63	19	55	1st ↑	N/A	N/A
1997–98	First League of BiH	1	30	10	5	15	36	50	35	14th↓	1/16	N/A
1998–99	Second League of BiH	2	30	15	5	10	55	37	50	4th	N/A	N/A
1999–00	Second League of BiH	2	30	16	8	6	43	19	56	2nd ↑	N/A	N/A
2000–01	Premier League of BiH	1	42	18	8	16	61	47	62	14th	QF	N/A
2001–02	Premier League of BiH	1	30	11	5	14	40	46	38	13th↓	1/8	N/A
2002–03	First League of FBiH	2	36	20	2	14	85	51	62	2nd	DNQ	N/A
2003–04	First League of FBiH	2	30	10	8	12	36	40	38	13th↓	DNQ	N/A
2004–05	Second League of FBiH – Center	3	12	?	?	?	?	?	?	1st ↑	DNQ	N/A
2005–06	First League of FBiH	2	30	6	7	17	28	48	25	15th↓	DNQ	N/A
2006–07	Second League of FBiH – Center	3	12	?	?	?	?	?	?	2nd	DNQ	N/A
2007–08	Second League of FBiH – Center	3	12	11	1	0	25	2	34	1st ↑	DNQ	N/A
2008–09	First League of FBiH	2	30	19	3	8	42	23	60	1st ↑	QF	N/A
2009–10	Premier League of BiH	1	30	12	8	10	30	34	44	6th	1/16	N/A
2010–11	Premier League of BiH	1	30	14	6	10	35	33	48	5th	SF	N/A
2011–12	Premier League of BiH	1	30	15	7	8	44	23	52	5th	1/16	N/A
2012–13	Premier League of BiH	1	30	13	10	7	34	26	49	5th	QF	N/A
2013–14	Premier League of BiH	1	30	10	11	9	39	30	41	8th	QF	N/A
2014–15	Premier League of BiH	1	30	13	7	10	41	34	46	6th	Winners	N/A
2015–16	Premier League of BiH	1	30	11	6	13	36	33	39	8th	1/16	Europa League (QR1)
2016–17	Premier League of BiH	1	32	5	8	19	28	62	23	12th↓	1/16	N/A
2017–18	First League of FBiH	2	30	18	7	5	44	20	61	2nd	QF	N/A
2018–19	First League of FBiH	2	30	21	6	3	58	18	69	2nd	DNQ	N/A
2019–20*	First League of FBiH	2	16	11	4	1	28	13	37	1st ↑	QF	N/A
2020–21	Premier League of BiH	1	33	7	4	22	22	58	25	12th↓	1/16	N/A

=== Key ===
1st / W	2nd / RUP	3rd	↑	↓
Champions	Runners-up	Third finish	Promoted	Relegated

League: P = Matches played; W = Matches won; D = Matches drawn; L = Matches lost; F = Goals for; A = Goals against; Pts = Points won; Pos = Final position;
Cup: QF = Quarter-final; SF = Semi-final; RU = Runner-up; W = Competition won;

- 1993–94: Shortly after the club was founded in 1993, each canton formed their own league, and played their very first season after which the champion of each canton would go on to play in the regional FBiH leagues in 1994–95 where there were four regional leagues. FK Olimpik Sarajevo was to compete in the regional group of Tuzla.
- 1994–95: This season was played in the initial stage of the FBiH which consisted of four groups based on regions. FK Olimpik Sarajevo was in the group known as group Tuzla where they achieved the results in the table, and fell just underneath the line of qualification for the play-offs to the final play-offs where four teams played in a lesser league against one another in pursuit of winning the league as a whole.
- 2019–20: First League of FBiH season suspended in March 2020 due to the COVID-19 pandemic in Bosnia and Herzegovina; season curtailed and final standings (including Olimpik as champions) declared by a points-per-game ratio on 26 May 2020.

== Honours ==
=== Domestic ===
==== League ====
- First League of the Federation of Bosnia and Herzegovina
  - Winners (3): 1996–97 (south), 2008–09, 2019–20
  - Runners-up (3): 2002–03, 2017–18, 2018–19
- Second League of the Federation of Bosnia and Herzegovina
  - Winners (2): 2004–05 (center), 2007–08 (center)

==== Cups ====
- Bosnia and Herzegovina Cup:
  - Winners (1): 2014–15

==== Recognitions ====
- Award for Best Organized Club in Bosnia and Herzegovina
  - Winners (1): 2010

== European record ==
As of 9 July 2015

Competition	P	W	D	L	GF	GA	GD
UEFA Europa League	2	0	2	0	1	1	0
Total	2	0	2	0	1	1	0

P = Matches played; W = Matches won; D = Matches drawn; L = Matches lost; GF = Goals for; GA = Goals against; GD = Goals difference. Defunct competitions indicated in italics.

=== List of matches ===
Season	Competition	Round	Opponent	Home	Away	Agg.
2015–16	UEFA Europa League	1Q	(Slovakia) Spartak Trnava	1–1	0–0	1–1 (a)

== Records ==
- Biggest Bosnian league victory: Olimpik – Đerzelez Zenica (in Zenica): 10:0 (2000–01 Bosnian Premier league season, Round 39; 27 May 2001)

== Managerial history ==
- (Bosnia and Herzegovina) Slobodan Rajović (October 1993 – 1995)
- (Bosnia and Herzegovina) Senad Kreso (1995–1996)
- (Bosnia and Herzegovina) Mensur Dogan (1999–2000)
- (Bosnia and Herzegovina) Boris Bračulj (2000–2001)
- (Bosnia and Herzegovina) Jusuf Čizmić (2001–2002)
- (Bosnia and Herzegovina) Asim Saračević (2002–2003)
- (Bosnia and Herzegovina) Fuad Švrakić (2003)
- (Bosnia and Herzegovina) Samir Jahić (2004)
- (Bosnia and Herzegovina) Mensur Dogan (1 July 2004 – 30 June 2005)
- (Bosnia and Herzegovina) Muamer Vukas (30 June 2005 – 1 July 2006)
- (Bosnia and Herzegovina) Nermin Hadžiahmetović (1 July 2006 – 30 June 2008)
- (Bosnia and Herzegovina) Husref Musemić (4 October 2008 – 26 August 2009)
- (Bosnia and Herzegovina) Faik Kolar (interim) (27 August 2009 – 30 August 2009)
- (Bosnia and Herzegovina) Vlatko Glavaš (31 August 2009 – 10 November 2009)
- (Bosnia and Herzegovina) Edin Prljača (11 November 2009 – 17 October 2010)
- (Bosnia and Herzegovina) Mehmed Janjoš (18 October 2010 – 15 August 2011)
- (Bosnia and Herzegovina) Nedim Jusufbegović (15 August 2011 – 19 September 2012)
- (Bosnia and Herzegovina) Fahrudin Zejnilović (interim) (19 September 2012 – 20 September 2012)
- (Bosnia and Herzegovina) Husref Musemić (20 September 2012 – 10 February 2013)
- (Bosnia and Herzegovina) Denis Sadiković (10 February 2013 – 11 April 2013)
- (Bosnia and Herzegovina) Nedim Jusufbegović (11 April 2013 – 3 October 2013)
- (Bosnia and Herzegovina) Faik Kolar (3 October 2013 – 4 May 2014)
- (Bosnia and Herzegovina) Mirza Varešanović (4 May 2014 – 21 November 2015)
- (Bosnia and Herzegovina) Edin Prljača (23 November 2015 – 29 February 2016)
- (Bosnia and Herzegovina) Milomir Odović (2 March 2016 – 18 April 2016)
- (Bosnia and Herzegovina) Faik Kolar (18 April 2016 – 27 August 2016)
- (Bosnia and Herzegovina) Dragan Radović (27 August 2016 – 1 November 2016)
- (Bosnia and Herzegovina) Asim Saračević (interim) (2 November 2016 – 8 November 2016)
- (Bosnia and Herzegovina) Darko Dražić (9 November 2016 – 27 December 2016)
- (Bosnia and Herzegovina) Faruk Kulović (27 December 2016 – 3 March 2017)
- (Bosnia and Herzegovina) Dragan Radović (3 March 2017 – 8 June 2017)
- (Bosnia and Herzegovina) Mirza Varešanović (8 June 2017 – 23 November 2017)
- (Bosnia and Herzegovina) Dino Đurbuzović (24 November 2017 – 2 April 2018)
- (Bosnia and Herzegovina) Dragan Radović (3 April 2018 – 13 September 2018)
- (Bosnia and Herzegovina) Esad Selimović (13 September 2018 – 11 December 2019)
- (Bosnia and Herzegovina) Darko Vojvodić (13 December 2019 – 5 September 2020)
- (Bosnia and Herzegovina) Esad Selimović (5 September 2020 – 16 November 2020)
- (Bosnia and Herzegovina) Dževad Šarić (interim) (16 November 2020 – 12 December 2020)
- (Serbia) Slavko Petrović (12 December 2020 – 30 June 2021)

== Chairmen ==
- (Bosnia and Herzegovina) Ramiz Krilašević (October 1993 – 2000)
- (Bosnia and Herzegovina) Šefkija Okerić (October 1993 – 2000)
- (Bosnia and Herzegovina) Suad Osmanagić (October 1993 – 2000)
- (Bosnia and Herzegovina) Edhem Okerić (October 1993 – 2000)
- (Bosnia and Herzegovina) Salem Hadžiahmetović (2000–2002)
- (Bosnia and Herzegovina) Samir Jahić (2002–2006)
- (Bosnia and Herzegovina) Nijaz Gracić (9 June 2006 – 27 May 2016)
- (Bosnia and Herzegovina) Faruk Hadžović (27 May 2016 – 14 December 2016)
- (Bosnia and Herzegovina) Damir Dizdar (14 December 2016 – 2021)
