= Federation of Bosnia and Herzegovina Cup =

- Region: Federation of Bosnia and Herzegovina
- Current champions: Competition has no champion
- 2020–21

Federation of Bosnia and Herzegovina Cup is an annual football competition held in the entity of Federation of Bosnia and Herzegovina to determine ten participants of the Bosnia and Herzegovina Football Cup. The competition has no winner.

== Competition format ==
=== Old formats ===
Each canton FA organizes its own cup, held in Fall through early summer next year and each canton has two berths in the Federation Cup. That makes 20 teams. Then, 20 teams are drawn to make 10 matchups of the final, which are played over one leg in late August or early September. Winners (10) qualify to national cup. Big problem is lack of interest at both clubs and cantonal FAs so Federation Cup never had 20 teams - if there are no 20 teams, some teams, depending on draw, get bye to national cup. Competition has no winner although it only stage is called final.

From the 2014–15 season, a new format was introduced. It was still 20 teams, but 16 spots were awarded to teams from the First League of the Federation of Bosnia and Herzegovina while the remaining 4 spots were filled with teams from cantonal cups.

=== Current format ===
As there were changes in the Premier League of Bosnia and Herzegovina number of teams in the 2016–17 season, this cup was supposed to qualify two more teams to the national cup. The new format was introduced. There were two rounds. In the First round 16 teams from lower leagues, still qualified through their respective Canton cup, would play each other, with winners qualifying to the Second round where then they were paired with 16 teams of the First League of FBiH. In the end, 12 winners qualify to the national cup.

== Previous editions ==
2014–15 Federation of Bosnia and Herzegovina Cup
2015–16 Federation of Bosnia and Herzegovina Cup
2017–18 Federation of Bosnia and Herzegovina Cup
