= Stadion Otoka =

Stadium in Sarajevo, Bosnia and Herzegovina

Otoka Stadium
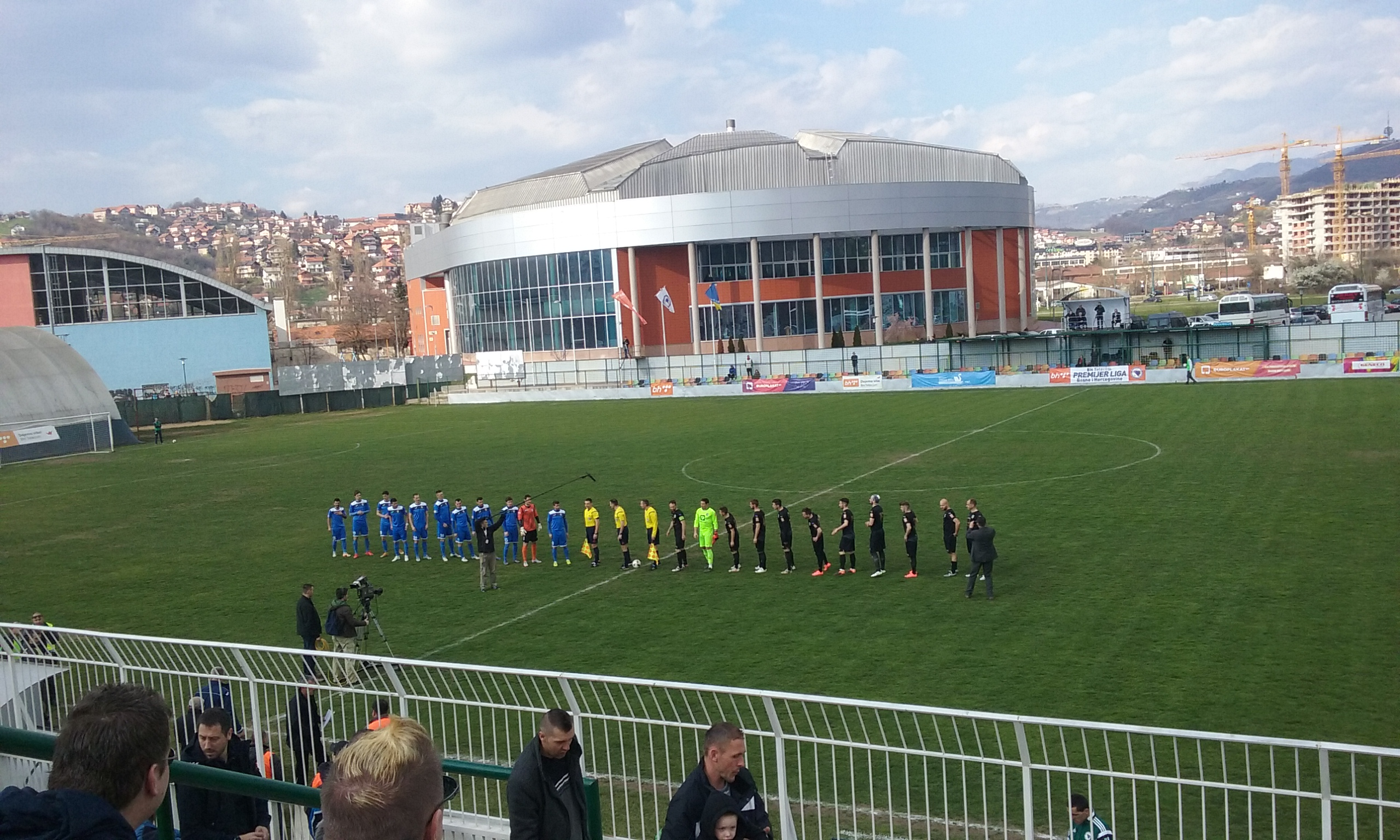
- Interactive map of Otoka Stadium
- Location: Otoka, Sarajevo, Bosnia and Herzegovina
- Owner: City of Sarajevo
- Capacity: 3,000
- Surface: Grass
- Field size: 103 x 65 m (112.6 x 71,1 yd)

Construction
- Built: 1993
- Opened: 1993
- Renovated: 2011

Tenant
- FK Olimpik (1993–2021)

Otoka Stadium (Stadion Otoka / Стадион Отока) is a football stadium in Otoka neighborhood of Sarajevo, Bosnia and Herzegovina. It is currently a home ground to SFK 2000, while it was also a home ground to a former FK Olimpik from 1993 to 2021. The stadium capacity is 3,000 seats.

== Construction ==
The stadium was built in 1993, during the Siege of Sarajevo. The stadium was mostly used by local club FK Olimpik. Other than for being a home ground for the club, the stadium was built to promote sports (particularly football) in the Otoka district of Sarajevo, as there was no other sports club or stadium in Otoka at the time.

Within this sports complex lies the Otoka olympic swimming pool, used by the Bosnia and Herzegovina men's national water polo team.

== Renovation ==
The stadium was supposed to properly be renovated by the early 2010. This caused a temporary relocation of FK Olimpik to the Grbavica Stadium. The renovation included covering of the present west stand, and building three totally new covered stands. The seating capacity was supposed to be raised to 9,000 and the ground surface was supposed to be covered in artificial grass.

Also, some additional features like shops and restaurants were to be opened. It was then announced that the renovated stadium, which should have been able to seat about 7,200 people, was supposed be opened on fifth round of the 2011–12 Bosnian Premier League season against FK Željezničar on 27 or 28 August 2011.

Ultimately the properly planned renovation never happened, except the one in 2011, when the stands and the pitch were renovated. Since then, the stadium has stayed in that condition ever since, with minor renovations just to meet the Football Association of Bosnia and Herzegovina standards.

== See also ==
- List of football stadiums in Bosnia and Herzegovina
