= Republic of Bosnia and Herzegovina =

Balkan country (1992–1995)

Coordinates: 43.8670°N 18.4170°E

Republic of Bosnia and Herzegovina Република Босна и Херцеговина, Republika Bosna i Hercegovina (Serbo-Croatian)
- 1992–1995
- Flag Coat of arms
- Anthem: Jedna si jedina
- Status: Sovereign state that claimed the entire territory of Bosnia and Herzegovina (Note: Although afforded international recognition, from the proclamation of the Federal Republic of Yugoslavia until the Dayton Agreement, the Federal Republic of Yugoslavia claimed Bosnia and Herzegovina as its territory)
- Capital: Sarajevo
- Official languages: Serbo-Croatian
- Religion: Secular state
- Demonym: Bosnian
- Government: Unitary parliamentary republic
- President of the Presidency
  - 1992–1996: Alija Izetbegović
- Prime Minister
  - 1992: Jure Pelivan
  - 1992–1993: Mile Akmadžić
  - 1993–1996: Haris Silajdžić
  - 1996–1997: Hasan Muratović
- Legislature: National Assembly
- Historical era: Breakup of Yugoslavia
  - Independence referendum: 1 March 1992
  - Independence declared: 3 March 1992
  - Bosnian War: 6 April 1992
  - Croat–Bosniak War: 18 October 1992
  - Washington Agreement: 18 March 1994
  - Dayton Agreement: 14 December 1995
- Currency: BH Dinar
- Calling code: +387
- ISO 3166 code: BA
Preceded by	Succeeded by
Socialist Republic of Bosnia and Herzegovina; SFR Yugoslavia	Bosnia and Herzegovina

The Republic of Bosnia and Herzegovina (Serbo-Croatian: Republika Bosna i Hercegovina / Република Босна и Херцеговина) was the Bosnian state in Southeastern Europe, existing from 1992 to 1995. It is the direct legal predecessor to the modern-day federal republic of Bosnia and Herzegovina.

Bosnia and Herzegovina seceded from the disintegrating Socialist Federal Republic of Yugoslavia on 3 March 1992. The Bosnian War broke out soon after its Declaration of Independence and lasted for 3 years. Leaders from two of the three main ethnicities of Bosnia and Herzegovina, namely the Serbs and the Croats, separately established their separatist quasi-states of Republika Srpska and the Croatian Republic of Herzeg-Bosnia, respectively, which were unrecognized by the Bosnian state and international governments. With the majority of Bosnian Serbs and Croats opting for their respective separatist states, the Republic of Bosnia and Herzegovina in reality came to be primarily supported by Bosniaks, while formally the presidency and government of the republic was still composed of Serbs and Croats along with Bosniaks and thus had a multi-ethnic character.

Under the Washington Agreement of 1994, however, Bosniaks were joined by Herzeg-Bosnia, in support for the Republic by the formation of the Federation of Bosnia and Herzegovina, a sub-state joint entity. In 1995, the Dayton Peace Accords joined the Federation of Bosnia and Herzegovina with the Serb entity, Republika Srpska, from that point onward recognized formally as a political sub-state entity without a right of secession, into the state of Bosnia and Herzegovina.

The prefix Republic was removed following the co-signing of the Annex 4 of the Dayton Agreement, containing the constitution of Bosnia and Herzegovina, on 14 December 1995.

== History ==
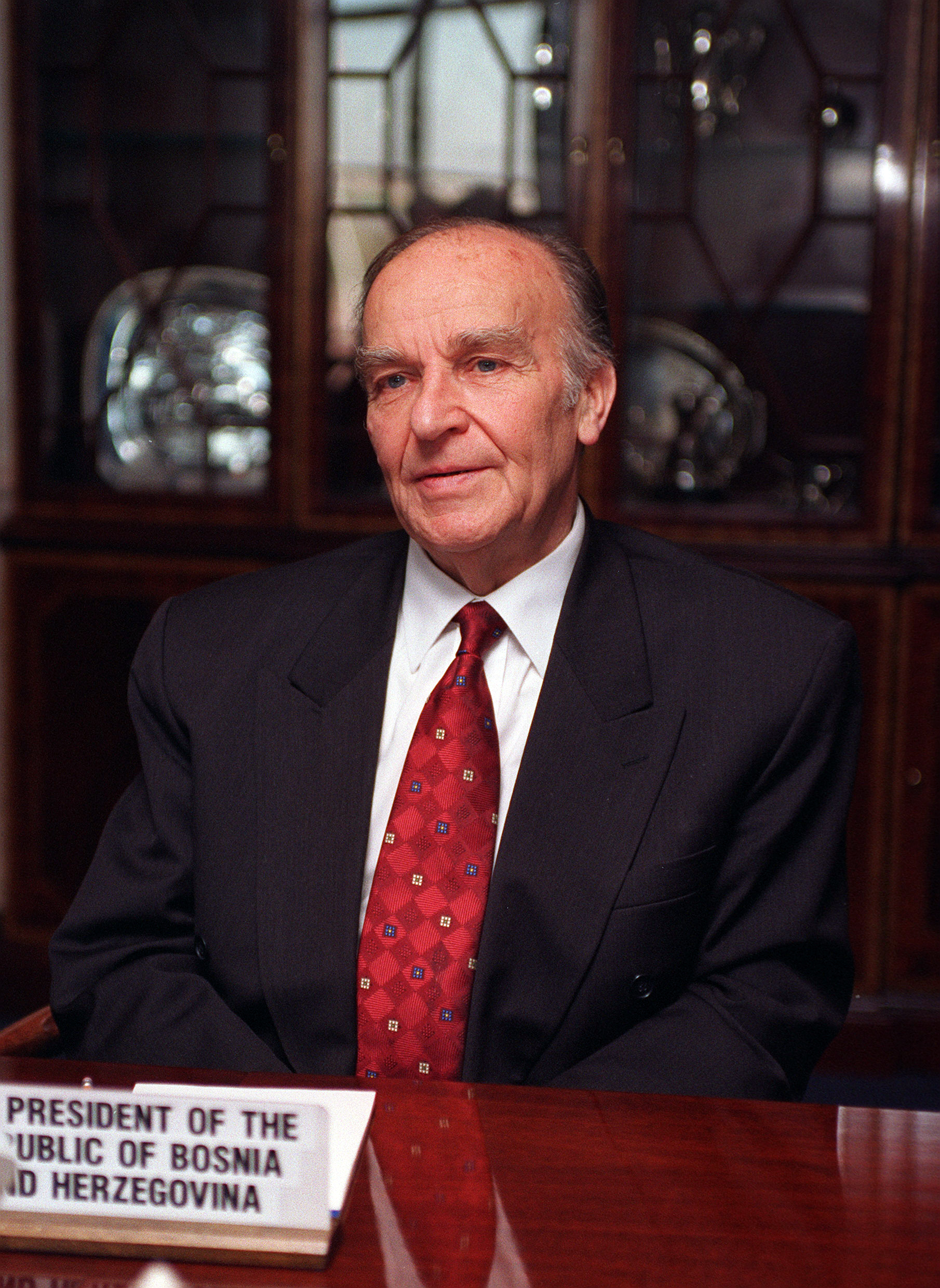
Alija Izetbegović during a visit to the United States in 1997.

The 1990 Bosnian general election led to a national assembly dominated by three ethnically based parties, which had formed a loose coalition to oust the communists from power. Croatia and Slovenia's subsequent declarations of independence and the warfare that ensued placed Bosnia and Herzegovina and its three constituent peoples in an awkward position. A significant split soon developed on the issue of whether to stay with the Yugoslav federation, overwhelmingly favored among Serbs, or seek independence, more favored among Bosniaks and Croats. A declaration of sovereignty in October 1991 was followed by a referendum for independence from Yugoslavia in February and March 1992. The referendum was boycotted by the great majority of Bosnian Serbs, so with a voter turnout of 64%, 99% of which voted in favor of the proposal, Bosnia and Herzegovina became a sovereign state.

While the first casualty of the war is debated, significant Serb offensives began in March 1992 in Eastern and Northern Bosnia. Following a tense period of escalating tensions and sporadic military incidents, open warfare began in Sarajevo on 6 April.

International recognition of Bosnia and Herzegovina meant that the Yugoslav People's Army (JNA) officially withdrew from the republic's territory, although their Bosnian Serb members merely joined the Army of Republika Srpska. Armed and equipped from JNA stockpiles in Bosnia, supported by volunteers, Republika Srpska's offensives in 1992 managed to place much of the country under its control. By 1993, when the Croat–Bosniak War erupted between the Sarajevo government and the Croatian Republic of Herzeg-Bosnia, about 70% of the country was controlled by the Serbs.

In 1993 the authorities in Sarajevo adopted a new language law (Službeni list Republike Bosne i Hercegovine, 18/93): "In the Republic of Bosnia and Herzegovina, the Ijekavian standard literary language of the three constitutive nations is officially used, designated by one of the three terms: Bosnian, Serbian, Croatian."

In March 1994, the signing of the Washington accords between the Bosniak and ethnic-Croatian leaders led to the creation of a joint Bosniak-Croat Federation of Bosnia and Herzegovina. This, along with international outrage at Serb war crimes and atrocities, most notably the Srebrenica genocide of over 8,000 people in July 1995, helped turn the tide of war. The signing of the Dayton Agreement in Paris by Alija Izetbegović, Franjo Tuđman and Slobodan Milošević brought a halt to the fighting, roughly establishing the basic structure of the present-day state. The three years of war and bloodshed had left between 95,000 and 100,000 people dead (mostly Bosniaks), and more than 2 million displaced.

== Demographics ==
Bosnia and Herzegovina had more demographic variety than most other European countries. According to the 1991 census Bosnia and Herzegovina had 4,364,649 inhabitants. The four largest named nationalities were Bosniaks (1,905,274 inhabitants, or 43.65%), Serbs (1,369,883 inhabitants, or 31.39%), Croats (755,883 inhabitants, or 17.32%), and Yugoslavs (239,857 inhabitants, or 5.5%).

== Politics and government ==
The republic of Bosnia and Herzegovina was a unitary state where power is centralised in the national government rather than shared with regional units like federalism.

=== Travel documents ===
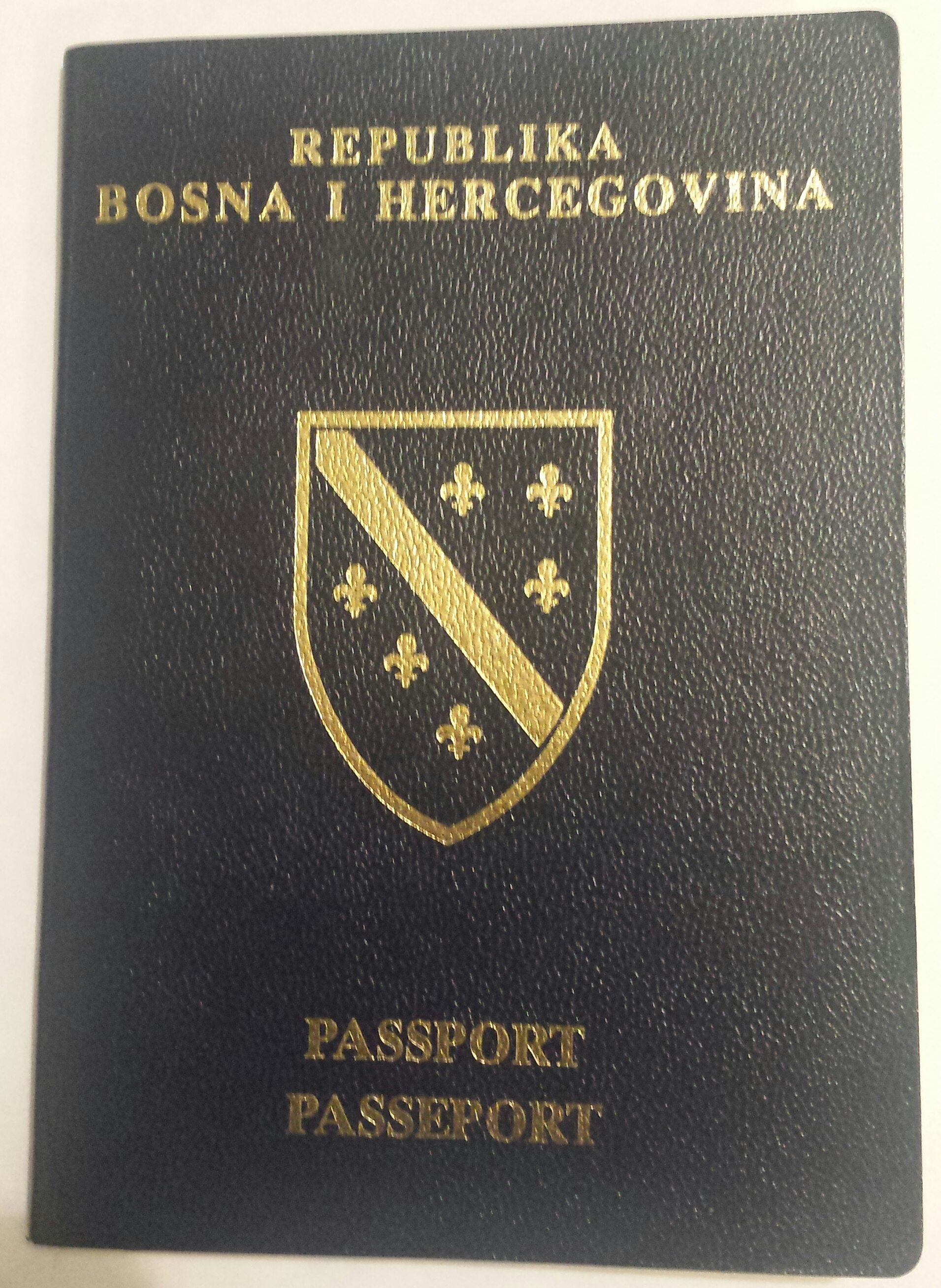
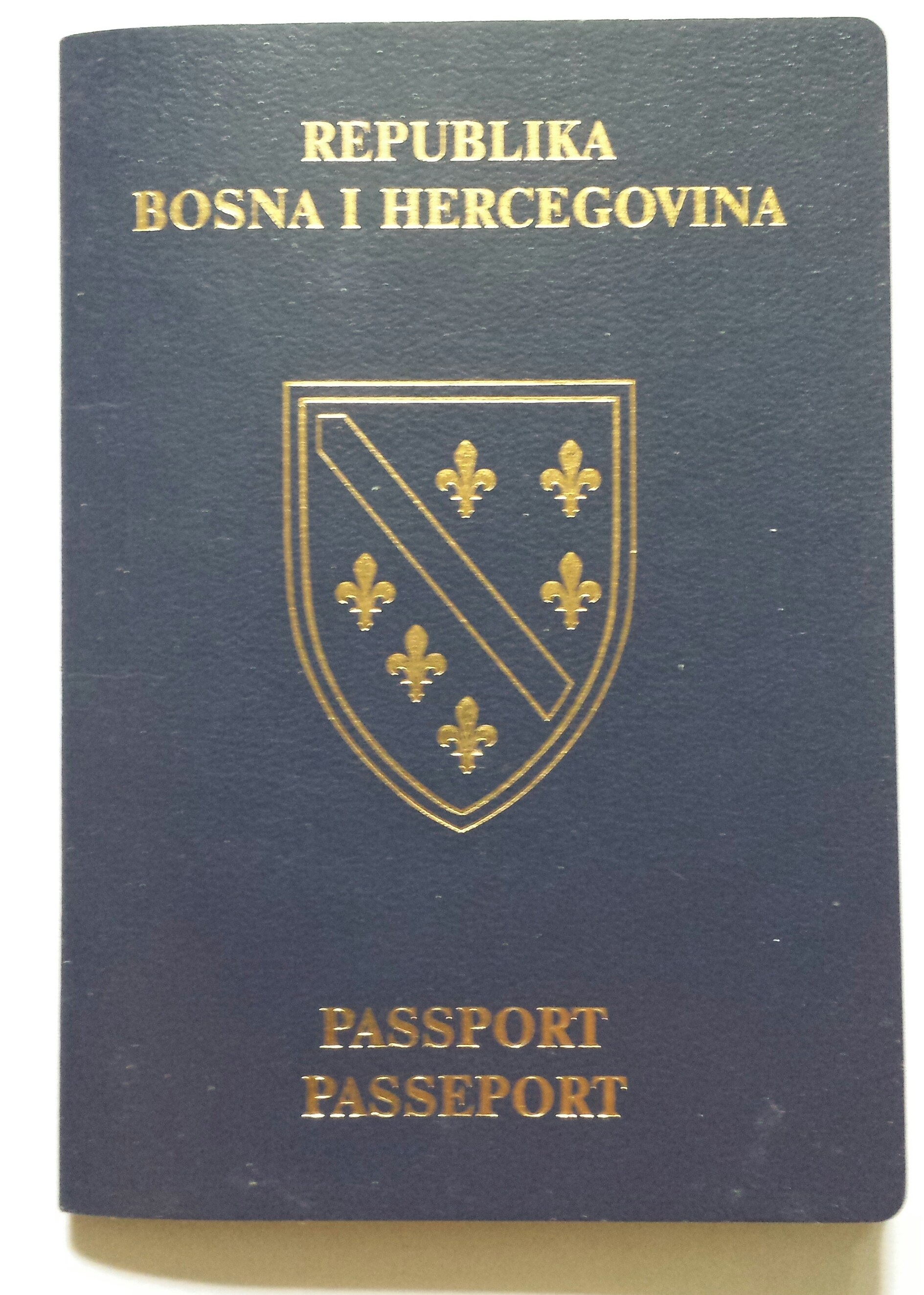
Sarajevo issue RBiH passport; and Zagreb Embassy issue RBiH passport.

In October 1992, a limited number of Republic of Bosnia and Herzegovina passports were printed and available to its citizens. The document allowed the holders to enter and leave the newly formed country legally as well as other nations traveled to.

The Republic's official documents and passports were valid until the end of 1997 when the implementation of the Dayton Agreement commenced the modern-day state of Bosnia and Herzegovina. The RBiH passports were replaced by the Bosnia and Herzegovina passport and the Bosnia and Herzegovina identity card.

== Education system ==
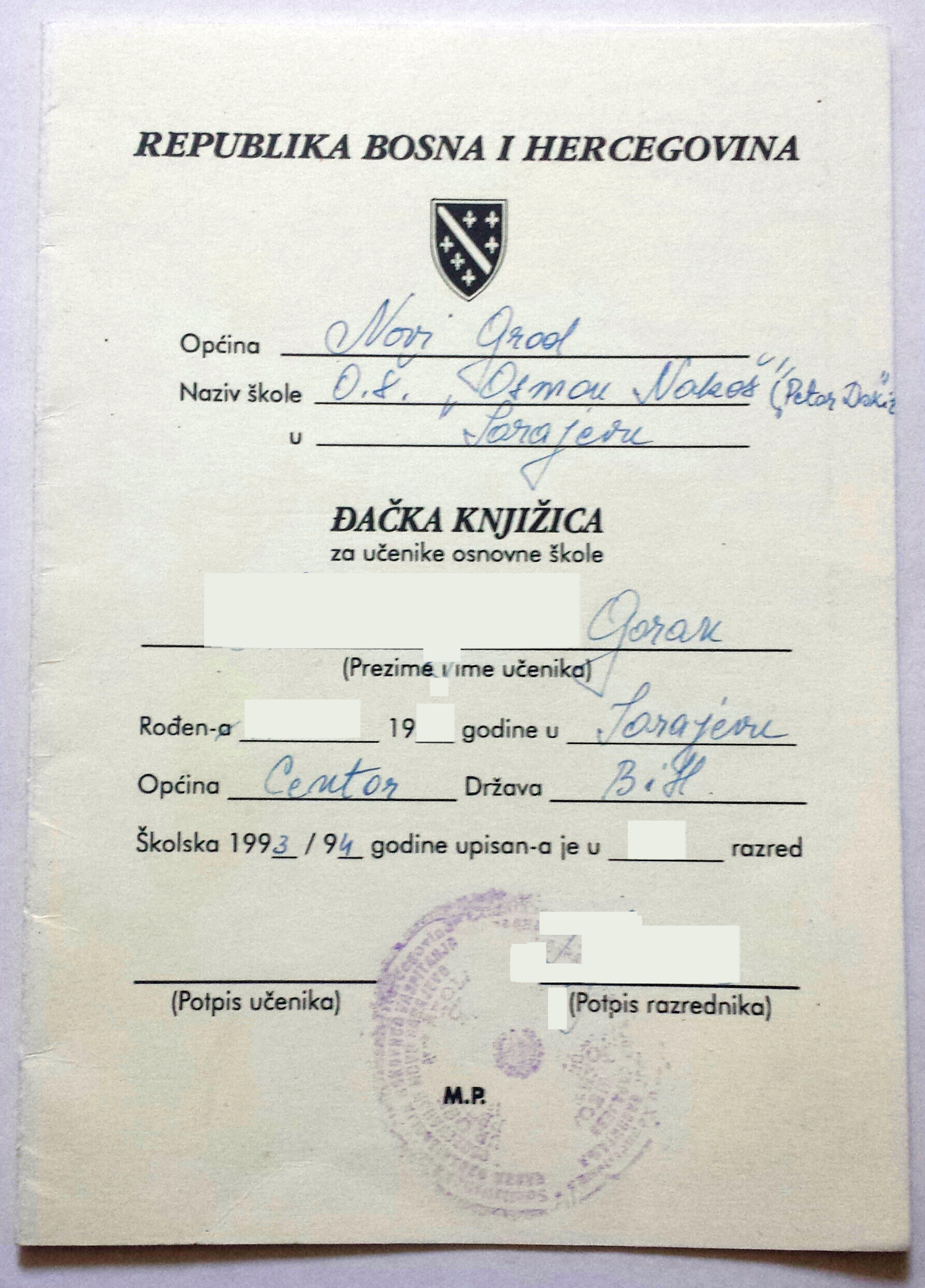
Primary school wartime student report card.

During the Bosnian War, schooling continued primarily in major cities. In besieged Sarajevo, schools operated in dispersed basement classrooms in neighborhoods across the capital city, under the constant threat of enemy guns and mortar fire. Depending on the part of the country, teaching staff needed to adjust to the war circumstances, and classrooms were often held in houses and hallways. In some places, the school buildings were even turned into refugee camps, hospitals or military headquarters.

For the 1992–93 school year, the subjects and curriculum were closely linked to those from the Socialist Republic of Bosnia and Herzegovina period. However, education during the war had many shortcomings, such as an unstable infrastructure, a lack of teachers, and a severe lack of textbooks.

The names of many schools in Sarajevo were changed during the RBiH period and remain so in present-day Bosnia. The Ideology of socialist Yugoslavia and achievements of the National Liberation Struggle altered many school names, especially those named after predominantly non-Bosniak historical figures. Only 3 schools from roughly sixty in the capital were changed.

== Army ==
Seal of the Army of the Republic of Bosnia and Herzegovina.

The Army of the Republic of Bosnia and Herzegovina (ARBiH) were the armed forces of the Republic of Bosnia and Herzegovina during the war in Bosnia and Herzegovina. The ARBiH was established on 15 April 1992, and most of the structure is transferred from the former Territorial Defense of Bosnia and Herzegovina. The Army after the Dayton Agreement was defined as the Bosniak component of the Army of the Federation of Bosnia and Herzegovina, and after defense, reforms transformed into the Bosnian rangers, one of the three brigades of the Armed Forces of Bosnia and Herzegovina.

== Currency ==
Following the introduction of the Bosnian dinar and replacement of the Yugoslav dinar, the Bosnian dinar was in circulation in most of the territory controlled by the Army of the Republic of Bosnia and Herzegovina. The areas under Croatian control used the Croatian dinar and also kuna, and the Bosnia and Herzegovina territory held by Serb forces, proclaimed Republika Srpska, dinar was also introduced as a means of payment. Shortly after the introduction of the dinar, the Deutsche Mark was preferred as the new means of payment in the Bosniak and Croat dominated RBiH. In present-day Bosnia and Herzegovina the currency is the convertible mark which replaced the dinar and Deutsche Mark, but many shops and gas stations accept Euro as a currency in practice.

== Postal service and philately ==
The country produced its first stamps since independence in 1993 under the command of the Sarajevo government and began inscribing them as Republika Bosna i Hercegovina. Prior to 1993, newly formed Republic of Bosnia and Herzegovina used SFR Yugoslav stamps, overprinted to Sovereign Bosnia and Herzegovina over the face of stamp. Territories that were not under government control, such as Herzeg-Bosnia and Republika Srpska, issued own stamps.

== Sport ==
Some prominent sporting achievements of the Republic of Bosnia and Herzegovina (1992–1997):

1992

- Mirjana Horvat finished 8th in Final of 1992 Summer Olympics – Women's 10 metre air rifle shooting discipline. RBiH made its debut at Olympics during 1992 Summer Olympics.

1993

- Republic of Bosnia and Herzegovina women's national basketball team won a gold medal at the Basketball at the 1993 Mediterranean Games.
- Ivan Sokolov representing RBiH won 1993 Vidmar Memorial chess championship.
- Republic of Bosnia and Herzegovina national basketball team finished 8th at the EuroBasket 1993. Sabahudin Bilalović was Top Scorer of the tournament averaging 25 (24.6) points per game.

1994

- ŠK Bosna won European Chess Club Cup.
- Predrag Nikolić representing RBiH won 1994 Tata Steel Chess Tournament.
- Republic of Bosnia chess team won 2nd place (silver medal) at the 31st Chess Olympiad.
- RBiH athletes participated in 1994 Winter Olympics.

1995

- Ivan Sokolov representing RBiH won the 1995 Dutch Chess Championship.

1996

- RBiH athletes participated in the 1996 Summer Olympics.
- On 6 November 1996, Republic of Bosnia and Herzegovina national football team defeated a 5th nation in the world at the time and 1994 FIFA World Cup runners-up Italy national football team 2–1 in Sarajevo. In the process RBiH recorded their first ever FIFA recognized international victory.

1997

- On 20 August 1997, Republic of Bosnia and Herzegovina national football team defeated a 3rd ranked nation in the world at the time Denmark national football team 3–0 in Sarajevo.

== See also ==
- History of Bosnia and Herzegovina
- Federation of Bosnia and Herzegovina
- Republika Srpska
