= PK Bosna =

Swimming club from Sarajevo, Bosnia and Herzegovina

- Founded: 1960
- Based in: Sarajevo
- Stadium: Olimpijski Bazen Otoka
- Website: http://www.pkbosna.ba/

PK Bosna is a swimming club from Sarajevo, Bosnia. The club is part of the University Sport Society USD Bosna (Bosnian: Univerzitetsko Sportsko Društvo Bosna). It was formed in 1960 and is part of the Swimming Federation of Bosnia and Herzegovina.

== Honors ==
Bosnia and Herzegovina Swimming Championship

- Winners (1) : 2010

== History ==
Swimming in the city of Sarajevo became more organized after World War II. PK Bosna was founded in 1960, and home grounds were the Higijena pool. Later they moved to the pool at Koševo. Official foundings were on June 11, 1981.
