= Visa requirements for Bosnia and Herzegovina citizens =

Administrative entry restrictions

A Bosnia and Herzegovina Passport

Visa requirements for Bosnia and Herzegovina citizens are administrative entry restrictions by the authorities of other states placed on citizens of Bosnia and Herzegovina.

As of 2026, Bosnia and Herzegovina citizens had visa-free or visa on arrival access to 121 countries and territories, ranking the Bosnia and Herzegovina passport 40th, tied with Albanian passport in the world according to the Henley Passport Index.

In 2016, the Bosnia and Herzegovina passport was declared one of the five passports with the most improved rating since 2006.

== History ==
On 3 August 2016, Bosnia and Herzegovina and Morocco signed an agreement to abolish visa requirements for the holders of diplomatic passports for period of 90 days.

Belarus introduced 5 days visa-free access to Bosnian citizens from 12 February 2017 if they arrive via Minsk International Airport, later expanded to 30 days.

Lesotho introduced an e-Visa system on 1 May 2017 for Bosnian citizens.

Qatar introduced an e-Visa system on 23 June 2017 for Bosnian citizens. On 1 January 2018, Japan abolished visa requirements for the holders of Bosnian diplomatic passports for period of 90 days. In March 2018, Colombia abolished visa requirements for Bosnian citizens.

A visa exemption agreement was signed with China on 28 November 2017 and it entered into force on 29 May 2018.

E-Visa available for Taiwan starting from 20 November 2019. As of 3 November 2022, Bosnia and Herzegovina and Kosovo formally signed an agreement abolishing visas.

Argentina abolished visa requirements for the holders of ordinary Bosnian passport on the 5 September 2023.

United Arab Emirates abolished visa requirements for the holders of Bosnian passport on the 1 September 2023.

In December 2015, it was announced by the Government of Bosnia and Herzegovina that visa requirements for holders of regular biometric passports would be abolished for Mexico and Japan while a simplified visa regime would be introduced with the United Kingdom.

== Visa requirements map ==
Visa requirements for Bosnia and Herzegovina citizens holding ordinary passports Bosnia and Herzegovina ID card travel Visa not required Visa on arrival eVisa Visa available both on arrival or online Visa required

== Visa requirements ==
Country	Visa requirement	Allowed stay	Notes (excluding departure fees)
Afghanistan	eVisa	30 days	Visa is not required in case born in Afghanistan or can proof that one of their parents is a national of Afghanistan or born in Afghanistan.; e-Visa : Visitors must arrive at Kabul International (KBL).
Albania	Visa not required	90 days	ID card valid.
Algeria	Visa required		
Andorra	Visa not required	90 days	
Angola	Visa required		
Antigua and Barbuda	eVisa		
Argentina	Visa not required	90 days	
Armenia	eVisa / Visa on arrival	120 days	
Australia	Online Visa required		May apply online (Online Visitor e600 visa).
Austria	Visa not required	90 days	90 days within any 180 day period in the Schengen Area. (Note: Holders of biometric passports only.)
Azerbaijan	eVisa	90 days	
Bahamas	eVisa	3 months	
Bahrain	eVisa / Visa on arrival	14 days	
Bangladesh	Visa on arrival	30 days	
Barbados	Visa required		
Belarus	Visa not required	30 days	Until 31 December 2026. 90 days in a calendar year.
Belgium	Visa not required	90 days	90 days within any 180 day period in the Schengen Area.
Belize	Visa required		
Benin	eVisa	30 days	Must have an international vaccination certificate.
Bhutan	eVisa		
Bolivia	Online Visa / Visa on arrival	90 days	
Botswana	eVisa	3 months	
Brazil	Visa not required	90 days	
Brunei	Visa required		
Bulgaria	Visa not required	90 days	90 days within any 180 day period in the Schengen Area.
Burkina Faso	eVisa		
Burundi	Visa on arrival	1 month	
Cambodia	eVisa / Visa on arrival	30 days	
Cameroon	eVisa		
Canada	Visa required		
Cape Verde	Visa on arrival		
Central African Republic	Visa required		
Chad	eVisa		
Chile	Visa not required	90 days	
China	Visa not required	90 days	90 days within any 180 day period.; Visa also not required to Hong Kong for 2 weeks; Macao for 3 months.
Colombia	Visa not required	90 days	
Comoros	Visa on arrival	45 days	
Republic of the Congo	eVisa		
Democratic Republic of the Congo	eVisa	7 days	
Costa Rica	Visa required		90 days visa free if hold a valid, multiple-entry visa or residence permit issued by Canada, the European Union member state, Iceland, Norway, Switzerland, the United Kingdom or the United States
Côte d'Ivoire	eVisa	3 months	e-Visa holders must arrive via Port Bouet Airport.
Croatia	Visa not required	90 days	90 days within any 180 day period in the Schengen Area.
Cuba	Visa not required	90 days	
Cyprus	Visa not required	90 days	90 days within any 180 day period.
Czech Republic	Visa not required	90 days	90 days within any 180 day period in the Schengen Area.
Denmark	Visa not required	90 days	90 days within any 180 day period in the Schengen Area.
Djibouti	eVisa	90 days	
Dominica	Visa not required	21 days	
Dominican Republic	Visa not required	90 days	extension of stay is possible for up to 120 days for a fee
Ecuador	Visa not required	90 days	
Egypt	eVisa	30 days	
El Salvador	Visa required		90 days visa free if hold a valid visa issued by Canada, the United States or a Schengen member state
Equatorial Guinea	eVisa		
Eritrea	Visa required		
Estonia	Visa not required	90 days	90 days within any 180 day period in the Schengen Area.
Eswatini	Visa not required	30 days	
Ethiopia	eVisa / Visa on arrival	up to 90 days	e-Visa holders must arrive via Addis Ababa Bole International Airport.
Fiji	eVisa		
Finland	Visa not required	90 days	90 days within any 180 day period in the Schengen Area.
France	Visa not required	90 days	90 days within any 180 day period in the Schengen Area. (in Regions of France)
Gabon	eVisa	90 days	e-Visa holders must arrive via Libreville International Airport.
Gambia	Visa required		
Georgia	Visa not required	1 year	
Germany	Visa not required	90 days	90 days within any 180 day period in the Schengen Area.
Ghana	Visa required		
Greece	Visa not required	90 days	90 days within any 180 day period in the Schengen Area.
Grenada	Visa required		Holders of a pre-clearance letter may collect visa upon arrival.
Guatemala	Visa required		90 days visa free if hold a valid visa issued by Canada, the United States or a Schengen member state
Guinea	eVisa	90 days	
Guinea-Bissau	Visa on arrival	90 days	
Guyana	Visa required		
Haiti	Visa not required	3 months	
Honduras	Visa required		90 days visa free if hold a valid visa issued by Canada, the United States or a Schengen member state
Hungary	Visa not required	90 days	90 days within any 180 day period in the Schengen Area.
Iceland	Visa not required	90 days	90 days within any 180 day period in the Schengen Area.
India	eVisa	30 days	e-Visa holders must arrive via 32 designated airports (Note: Ahmedabad; Amritsar; Bagdogra; Bengaluru; Bhubaneswar; Chandigarh; Chennai; Coimbatore; Delhi; Gaya; Goa-Dabolim; Goa-Manohar; Guwahati; Hyderabad; Indore; Jaipur; Kannur; Kochi; Kolkata; Kozhikode; Lucknow; Madurai; Mangaluru; Mumbai; Nagpur; Port Blair; Pune; Surat; Thiruvananthapuram; Tiruchirappalli; Varanasi; Visakhapatnam) or 5 designated seaports. (Note: Chennai; Cochin; Mormugao (Goa); Mumbai; Mangalore); An Indian e-Tourist Visa may only be obtained twice within 1 calendar year.; Foreigners of Pakistani origin or who hold a Pakistani Passport are not eligible for an e-Visa. Foreigners who are not Pakistani nationals, but whose parents or grandparents (either paternal or maternal) were born in, or were permanent residents in Pakistan, are also not eligible for an e-Visa.
Indonesia	e-VOA / Visa on arrival	30 days	
Iran	Visa not required	15 days	
Iraq	eVisa		
Ireland	Visa required		Visa is issued free of charge.; Visa waiver for UK 'C' visa holders until October 2016. Entry permitted only if first point of entry to the Common Travel Area is in the UK.
Israel	Visa required		
Italy	Visa not required	90 days	90 days within any 180 day period in the Schengen Area.
Jamaica	Visa on arrival	90 days	30 days visa free if hold a valid visa issued by any member state of Schengen Area, Canada, the United Kingdom or the United States and who have a proof that they are immunized against measles, rubella and polio
Japan	Visa required		
Jordan	eVisa / Visa on arrival	30 days	
Kazakhstan	eVisa		
Kenya	Electronic Travel Authorisation	90 days	Applications can be submitted up to 90 days prior to travel and must be submitted at least 3 days in advance.; eTA fee is 32.50 USD.; Proof of reservation at the hotel where visitors plan to stay is required (if staying with friends, an invitation letter is also acceptable).; Yellow fever vaccination certificate is required if coming from endemic countries.
Kiribati	Visa required		
North Korea	Visa required		
South Korea	Electronical Travel Authorization	30 days	The validity period of a K-ETA is 3 years from the date of approval.
Kuwait	Visa required		
Kyrgyzstan	Visa not required	60 days	
Laos	eVisa / Visa on arrival	30 days	18 (Note: Savannakhet Airport; Lanetoui - Mengkang (China); Meuangmom - Wan Pong (Myanmar); Banvang - Ban Khok Phai (Thailand); Namngeun - Huay Kon (Thailand); Paksan - Bueng Kan (Thailand); Paktaphan - Pak Saeng (Thailand); Pangmon - Ban Huak (Thailand); Phoudou (Thailand); Dak ta ock - Nam Giang (Vietnam); La Lai (Vietnam); Namkan (Vietnam); Namphao - Cau Treo (Vietnam); Namsoy - Na Meo (Vietnam); Naphao - Cha Lo (Vietnam); Pahang - Long Sap (Vietnam); Panghok - Tây Trang (Vietnam); Phoukeua - Bo Y (Vietnam)) of the 33 border crossings are only open to regular visa holders.; e-Visa may be used to enter Laos through the Luang Prabang, Pakse and Vientiane international airports, 3 Thai-Lao Friendship Bridges (Note: Vientiane (Friendship Bridge 1); Savannakhet (Friendship Bridge 2); Bokeo (Friendship Bridge 4)), in Boten (road and railroad), and in Vientiane (at Khamsavath railway station).; Visa on arrival is available at the Luang Prabang, Pakse and Vientiane international airports, 4 Thai-Lao Friendship Bridges (Note: Vientiane (Friendship Bridge 1); Savannakhet (Friendship Bridge 2); Khammouane (Friendship Bridge 3); Bokeo (Friendship Bridge 4)) and 7 border crossings. (Note: Nongnokkheane - Trapeang Kriel (Cambodia); Boten - Bo han (China); Golden Triangle/Samliemkham (Thailand); Khamsavath railway station (Thailand); Namheuang - Ban Na Kraseng (Thailand); Vang tao - Chongmek (Thailand); Dansavan - Lao Bảo (Vietnam))
Latvia	Visa not required	90 days	90 days within any 180 day period in the Schengen Area.
Lebanon	Visa required		In addition to a visa, an approval should be obtained from the Immigration department of the General Directorate of General Security (La Surete Generale).
Lesotho	eVisa		
Liberia	eVisa		
Libya	eVisa		
Liechtenstein	Visa not required	90 days	90 days within any 180 day period in the Schengen Area.
Lithuania	Visa not required	90 days	90 days within any 180 day period in the Schengen Area.
Luxembourg	Visa not required	90 days	90 days within any 180 day period in the Schengen Area.
Madagascar	eVisa / Visa on arrival	60 days	
Malawi	eVisa / Visa on arrival	90 days	
Malaysia	Visa not required	90 days	
Maldives	Free visa on arrival	30 days	
Mali	Visa required		
Malta	Visa not required	90 days	90 days within any 180 day period in the Schengen Area.
Marshall Islands	Visa on arrival	90 days	
Mauritania	eVisa		Available at Nouakchott–Oumtounsy International Airport.
Mauritius	Visa on arrival	60 days	
Mexico	Visa required		180 days Visa free for holders of valid visa or permanent residence issued by the US, Canada, Japan, United Kingdom, or Schengen area.
Micronesia	Visa not required	30 days	
Moldova	Visa not required	90 days	90 days within any 180 day period.
Monaco	Visa not required	90 days	
Mongolia	eVisa	30 days	
Montenegro	Visa not required	90 days	Biometric ID card valid for 30 days.
Morocco	Visa required		e-Visa available for foreign nationals holding a residence or stay permit valid for at least 180 days on the date of application for the e-visa and residing in one of the EU countries, the United States, Australia, Canada, the United Kingdom, Japan, Norway, New Zealand and Switzerland as well as foreign nationals holding non-electronic visas of Schengen countries, the United States Australia, Canada, the United Kingdom, Ireland, and New Zealand, with multiple entries and that are valid for at least 90 days as of the date of submission of the e-Visa application.
Mozambique	eVisa / Visa on arrival	30 days	
Myanmar	eVisa	28 days	e-Visa holders must arrive via Yangon, Nay Pyi Taw or Mandalay airports or via land border crossings with Thailand — Tachileik, Myawaddy and Kawthaung or India — Rih Khaw Dar and Tamu.; e-Visa is available for tourism only.
Namibia	Visa required		
Nauru	Visa required		
Nepal	Online Visa / Visa on arrival	90 days	
Netherlands	Visa not required	90 days	90 days within any 180 day period in the Schengen Area (European Netherlands).
New Zealand	Visa required		Holders of an Australian Permanent Resident Visa or Resident Return Visa may be granted a New Zealand Resident Visa on arrival permitting indefinite stay (pursuant to the Trans-Tasman Travel Arrangement), subject to meeting character requirements and obtaining an Electronic Travel Authority prior to departure.
Nicaragua	Visa required		Visa on arrival with valid visa issued by US, Canada, or Schengen Member State.
Niger	Visa required		
Nigeria	eVisa	90 days	
North Macedonia	Visa not required	90 days	ID card valid.
Norway	Visa not required	90 days	90 days within any 180 day period in the Schengen Area.
Oman	Visa required		To obtain an eVisa, they are required to be either residents or have a valid entry visa for one of the following countries (the United States of America, Canada, Australia, The United Kingdom, Schengen Agreement countries, Japan), or to be residents of one of the countries of The GCC countries and its profession are among the professions that benefit from the resident visa.
Pakistan	eVisa	90 days	
Palau	Free visa on arrival	30 days	
Panama	Visa not required	90 days	
Papua New Guinea	eVisa		Visitors may apply for a visa online under the "Tourist - Own Itinerary" category.
Paraguay	Visa required		
Peru	Visa required		
Philippines	Visa required		Residents of the United Arab Emirates may obtain an eVisa through the official Philippine eVisa website. A valid Emirati residence visa must be shown upon an eVisa application.
Poland	Visa not required	90 days	90 days within any 180 day period in the Schengen Area.
Portugal	Visa not required	90 days	90 days within any 180 day period in the Schengen Area.
Qatar	eVisa / Visa on arrival	30 days	
Romania	Visa not required	90 days	90 days within any 180 day period in the Schengen Area.
Russia	Visa not required	30 days	30 days within any 60 day period.
Rwanda	eVisa / Visa on arrival	30 days	
Saint Kitts and Nevis	eVisa		
Saint Lucia	Visa not required	6 weeks	
Saint Vincent and the Grenadines	Visa not required	3 months	
Samoa	Visa not required	60 days	
San Marino	Visa not required	90 days	
São Tomé and Príncipe	eVisa		
Saudi Arabia	Visa required		Holders of a U.S., U.K., or Schengen visa, or holders of permanent residency cards issued by the U.S., U.K., or any Schengen country, are eligible for a Saudi eVisa or a visa on arrival
Senegal	Visa required		
Serbia	Visa not required	90 days	ID card valid.
Seychelles	Electronic Border System	3 months	
Sierra Leone	eVisa	3 months	
Singapore	Visa not required	30 days	
Slovakia	Visa not required	90 days	90 days within any 180 day period in the Schengen Area.
Slovenia	Visa not required	90 days	90 days within any 180 day period in the Schengen Area.
Solomon Islands	Visa required		
Somalia	eVisa	30 days	
South Africa	Visa required		
South Sudan	eVisa		Obtainable online.; Printed visa authorization must be presented at the time of travel.
Spain	Visa not required	90 days	90 days within any 180 day period in the Schengen Area.
Sri Lanka	eVisa / Visa on arrival	60 days / 30 days	
Sudan	Visa required		
Suriname	Visa not required	90 days	An entrance fee of USD 50 or EUR 50 must be paid online prior to arrival.; Multiple entry e-Visa is also available.
Sweden	Visa not required	90 days	90 days within any 180 day period in the Schengen Area.
Switzerland	Visa not required	90 days	90 days within any 180 day period in the Schengen Area.
Syria	eVisa		
Tajikistan	Visa not required	30 days	Visa also available online.
Tanzania	eVisa / Visa on arrival	90 days	
Thailand	eVisa	60 days	
Timor-Leste	Visa on arrival	30 days	
Togo	eVisa	15 days	
Tonga	Visa required		
Trinidad and Tobago	Visa not required	90 days	
Tunisia	Visa not required	3 months	
Turkey	Visa not required	90 days	90 days within any 180 day period.
Turkmenistan	eVisa		
Tuvalu	Visa on arrival	1 month	
Uganda	eVisa	3 months	
Ukraine	Visa not required	30 days	30 days within any 60 day period.
United Arab Emirates	Visa not required	90 days	
United Kingdom	Visa required		
United States	Visa required		
Uruguay	Visa required		
Uzbekistan	Visa not required	30 days	
Vanuatu	eVisa		
Vatican City	Visa not required	90 days	
Venezuela	eVisa		Introduction of Electronic Visa System for Tourist and Business Travelers.
Vietnam	eVisa	90 days	Phú Quốc without a visa for up to 30 days.
Yemen	Visa required		
Zambia	eVisa / Visa on arrival	90 days	
Zimbabwe	eVisa / Visa on arrival	30 days	

== Territories and disputed areas ==
Visa requirements for Bosnia and Herzegovina citizens for visits to various territories, disputed areas and restricted zones:

Visitor to	Visa requirement	Allowed stay	Notes (excluding departure fees)
Europe
Kosovo	Visa not required		ID card valid.
Asia
Taiwan	eVisa	30 days	

== Dependent and autonomous territories ==
Countries	Visa requirement	Allowed stay	Notes
United Kingdom
Anguilla	eVisa required		Holders of a valid visa or residence permit for the United Kingdom, United States or Canada do not need a visa
Bermuda	Visa required		
British Virgin Islands	Visa required		Holders of a visa for the United Kingdom, United States or Canada do not need a visa. The visa for those countries must have at least 6 months of validity before travel
Cayman Islands	Visa required		
Falkland Islands	Visa required		
Gibraltar	Visa required		
Guernsey	Visa required		
Isle of Man	Visa required		
Jersey	Visa required		
Montserrat	eVisa		Holders of a valid visa for the United Kingdom, United States, Canada or an EU country do not need a visa.
Turks and Caicos Islands	Visa required		Holders of a valid visa or residence permit for the United Kingdom, United States or Canada do not need a visa
Saint Helena	eVisa		
China
Hong Kong	Visa not required	14 days	
Macau	Visa not required	90 days	
Denmark
Faroe Islands	Visa not required	90 days	
Greenland	Visa not required	90 days	
Netherlands
Aruba	Visa not required	30 days	
Caribbean Netherlands	Visa not required	90 days	includes Bonaire, Sint Eustatius and Saba
Curaçao	Visa not required	90 days	
Sint Maarten	Visa not required	90 days	
France
French Guiana	Visa not required	90 days	
French Polynesia	Visa not required	90 days	
(France) French West Indies	Visa not required	90 days	includes overseas departments of Guadeloupe and Martinique and overseas collectivities of Saint Martin and Saint Barthélemy
Mayotte	Visa not required	90 days	
New Caledonia	Visa not required	90 days	
Réunion	Visa not required	90 days	
Saint Pierre and Miquelon	Visa not required	90 days	
Wallis and Futuna	Visa not required	90 days	
New Zealand
Cook Islands	Visa not required	31 days	
Niue	Visa not required	30 days	
Tokelau	Entry permit required		
South Korea
Jeju Special Autonomous Province	Visa not required	30 days	
United States
American Samoa	Visa required		
Guam	Visa required		
Northern Mariana Islands	Visa required		
U.S. Virgin Islands	Visa required		
Puerto Rico	Visa required		

== Diplomatic and official passports only ==
Countries	allowed stay
Belarus	30 days
China	90 days
Egypt	90 days
Israel	90 days
Japan	90 days
Kazakhstan	30 days
Lebanon	30 days^{*}
Russia	90 days^{**}

_{* - VOA available.}
_{** - for ordinary passport for 30 days within any 60 day period.}

== Non-visa restrictions ==
=== Blank passport pages ===
Many countries require a minimum number of blank pages to be available in the passport being presented, typically one or two pages. Endorsement pages, which often appear after the visa pages, are not counted as being valid or available.

=== Vaccination ===
Cover of the new International Certificate of Vaccination issued by the Bureau of Quarantine in the Philippines since 2021

The African countries of Angola, Benin, Burkina Faso, Burundi, Cameroon, Central African Republic, Democratic Republic of the Congo, Republic of the Congo, Côte d'Ivoire, Gabon, Ghana, Guinea-Bissau, Mali, Niger, Sierra Leone and Togo, South Sudan and Uganda, along with French Guiana in South America, require all incoming passengers older than nine months to one year, to have a current International Certificate of Vaccination or Prophylaxis.

Some other countries require vaccination only if the passenger is coming from an infected area or has visited one recently or has transited for 12 hours in those countries: Algeria, Botswana, Cabo Verde, Chad, Djibouti, Egypt, Eswatini, Ethiopia, Gambia, Ghana, Guinea, Lesotho, Libya, Equatorial Guinea, Eritrea, Madagascar, Malawi, Mauritania, Mauritius, Mozambique, Namibia, Nigeria, Papua New Guinea, Seychelles, Somalia, South Africa, Sudan, Tunisia, Uganda, Tanzania, Zambia and Zimbabwe.

=== Passport validity length ===
Very few countries, such as Paraguay, just require a valid passport on arrival.

However many countries and groupings now require only an identity card – especially from their neighbours. Other countries may have special bilateral arrangements that depart from the generality of their passport validity length policies to shorten the period of passport validity required for each other's citizens or even accept passports that have already expired (but not been cancelled).

Some countries, such as Japan, Ireland and the United Kingdom, require a passport valid throughout the period of the intended stay.

In the absence of specific bilateral agreements, countries requiring passports to be valid for at least 6 more months on arrival include Afghanistan, Algeria, Anguilla, Bahrain, Bhutan, Botswana, British Virgin Islands, Brunei, Cambodia, Cameroon, Cape Verde, Cayman Islands, Central African Republic, Chad, Comoros, Costa Rica, Côte d'Ivoire, Curaçao, Ecuador, Egypt, El Salvador, Equatorial Guinea, Fiji, Gabon, Guinea Bissau, Guyana, Haiti, India, Indonesia, Iran, Iraq, Israel, Jordan, Kenya, Kiribati, Kuwait, Laos, Madagascar, Malaysia, Marshall Islands, Mongolia, Myanmar, Namibia, Nepal, Nicaragua, Nigeria, Oman, Palau, Papua New Guinea, Peru, Philippines, Qatar, Rwanda, Samoa, Saudi Arabia, Singapore, Solomon Islands, Somalia, Sri Lanka, Sudan, Suriname, Tanzania, Thailand, Timor-Leste, Tokelau, Tonga, Turkey, Tuvalu, Uganda, United Arab Emirates, Vanuatu, Venezuela, and Vietnam.

Countries requiring passports valid for at least 4 months on arrival include Micronesia and Zambia.

Countries requiring passports with a validity of at least 3 months beyond the date of intended departure include Azerbaijan, Bosnia and Herzegovina, Honduras, Montenegro, Nauru, Moldova and New Zealand. Similarly, the EEA countries of Iceland, Liechtenstein, Norway, all European Union countries (except Ireland) together with Switzerland also require 3 months validity beyond the date of the bearer's intended departure unless the bearer is an EEA or Swiss national.

Countries requiring passports valid for at least 3 months on arrival include Albania, North Macedonia, Panama, and Senegal.

Bermuda requires passports to be valid for at least 45 days upon entry.

Countries that require a passport validity of at least one month beyond the date of intended departure include Eritrea, Hong Kong, Lebanon, Macau, the Maldives and South Africa.

==== Maximum passport age ====
Countries of the Schengen area require non-EU passports to be less than 10 years old upon entry.

=== Criminal record ===
Some countries, including Australia, Canada, Fiji, New Zealand and the United States, routinely deny entry to non-citizens who have a criminal record, while others impose restrictions depending on the type of conviction and the length of the sentence.

=== Persona non grata ===
The government of a country can declare a diplomat persona non grata, banning them from entering the country or expelling them if they have already entered. In non-diplomatic use, the authorities of a country may also declare a foreigner persona non grata permanently or temporarily, usually because of unlawful activity.

=== Israeli stamps ===
Kuwait, Lebanon, Libya, and Yemen do not allow entry to people with passport stamps from Israel or whose passports have either a used or an unused Israeli visa, or where there is evidence of previous travel to Israel such as entry or exit stamps from neighbouring border posts in transit countries such as Jordan and Egypt.

To circumvent this Arab League boycott of Israel, the Israeli immigration services have now mostly ceased to stamp foreign nationals' passports on either entry to or exit from Israel (unless the entry is for some work-related purposes). Since 15 January 2013, Israel no longer stamps foreign passports at Ben Gurion Airport. Passports are still (as of 22 June 2017) stamped at Erez when passing into and out of Gaza.

Iran refuses admission to holders of passports containing an Israeli visa or stamp that is less than 12 months old.

=== Biometrics ===
Several countries mandate that all travellers, or all foreign travellers, be fingerprinted on arrival and will refuse admission to or even arrest travellers who refuse to comply. In some countries, such as the United States, this may apply even to transit passengers who merely wish to change planes rather than go landside.

Fingerprinting countries/regions include Afghanistan, Argentina, Brunei, Cambodia, China, Ethiopia, Ghana, Guinea, India, Japan, Kenya (both fingerprints and a photo are taken), Malaysia upon entry and departure, Mongolia, Saudi Arabia, the Schengen Area, Singapore, South Korea, Taiwan, Thailand, Uganda, the United Arab Emirates and the United States.

Many countries also require a photo be taken of people entering the country. The United States, which does not fully implement exit control formalities at its land frontiers (although long mandated by its own legislation), intends to implement facial recognition for passengers departing from international airports to identify people who overstay their visa.

Together with fingerprint and face recognition, iris scanning is one of three biometric identification technologies internationally standardised since 2006 by the International Civil Aviation Organization (ICAO) for use in e-passports and the United Arab Emirates conducts iris scanning on visitors who need to apply for a visa. The United States Department of Homeland Security has announced plans to greatly increase the biometric data it collects at US borders. In 2018, Singapore began trials of iris scanning at three land and maritime immigration checkpoints.

== See also ==
- Visa policy of Bosnia and Herzegovina
- Bosnia and Herzegovina passport
