= Bosnia and Herzegovina nationality law =

Law on Citizenship

Parliamentary Assembly of Bosnia and Herzegovina
- Long title: Law on Citizenship of Bosnia and Herzegovina
- Enacted by: High Representative for Bosnia and Herzegovina
- Enacted: 16 December 1997
- Status: Current legislation

The nationality law of Bosnia and Herzegovina governs the acquisition, transmission and loss of citizenship of Bosnia and Herzegovina. Regulated under the framework of the Law on Citizenship of Bosnia and Herzegovina, it is based primarily on the principle of jus sanguinis.

The concept of a Bosnian citizenship first arose following the establishment of the Socialist Republic of Bosnia and Herzegovina after World War II. Each constituent republic within Yugoslavia maintained its own subnational citizenship schemes, subordinate to federal citizenship.

Following the country's independence, the first stand-alone citizenship came into effect in October 1992, with the Republic of Bosnia and Herzegovina administering citizenship during the Bosnian War. Implementation of the Dayton Peace Accords saw the High Representative quash legislative deadlock by promulgating the current 1997 Law on Citizenship.

== Legislative framework ==
Article 7 of the Constitution provides the constitutional framework for the management of citizenship. It states that all citizens of the Entities are thereby citizens of Bosnia and Herzegovina, and provides that citizenship law is to be enacted by the Parliamentary Assembly.

High Representative Carlos Westendorp enacted the first Law on Citizenship in December 1997 following disputes among the political representatives of the different ethnic groups. After being adopted by the Parliamentary Assembly itself, it took effect on 1 January 1998. The current Law on Citizenship has been amended a number of times, namely in 1999, 2002, 2003, 2005, 2009 and, most recently, in 2013.

Entity citizenship is governed by the Entities' respective Laws on Citizenship.

Citizenship is currently administered by the Ministry of Civil Affairs.

== Acquisition of citizenship ==
Citizenship of Bosnia and Herzegovina is primarily acquired in the following ways:

- By descent – A person born to two citizens of Bosnia and Herzegovina (regardless of the place of birth), one citizen of Bosnia and Herzegovina (in cases of birth within Bosnia and Herzegovina) or one citizen of Bosnia and Herzegovina (in cases of birth abroad, where the child would otherwise be rendered stateless) is automatically a citizen of Bosnia and Herzegovina by descent.
- By birth – A person born in the territory of Bosnia and Herzegovina is automatically a citizen of Bosnia and Herzegovina where the identity of their parents is unknown, or where they would otherwise be rendered stateless.
- By naturalisation – A person submitting a request for naturalisation may acquire citizenship of Bosnia and Herzegovina provided they meet several conditions. These include having reached 18 years of age, having been a permanent resident of Bosnia and Herzegovina for at least 8 years prior to the application, having an adequate knowledge of Bosnian/Serbian/Croatian, passing a criminal record check and renouncing any other foreign citizenship.

== Loss of citizenship ==
Citizenship of Bosnia and Herzegovina can be lost, based on the principle of ensuring that no person is left stateless.

Bosnia and Herzegovina allows citizens to renounce their citizenship, provided that they have already acquired the nationality of another country. This process requires applicants to confirm that they are over 18 years of age, are not facing any ongoing criminal proceedings and have no outstanding financial obligations. Parents are also able to renounce the citizenship of their children, although consent must be provided by the child themselves if they are over 14 years of age.

In recent years, the cost of renunciation has become a significant source for "[making] money". Due to significant rates of brain drain from the country, with over 40% of people born in Bosnia and Herzegovina residing abroad, renunciation is often undertaken in order to acquire the citizenship of countries not permitting dual citizenship. Latest data from the Ministry of Civil Affairs show that over 4,000 people renounced their citizenship in 2018, providing 1.2–1.5 million convertible marks in revenue.

Citizenship can also be revoked in cases where applicants have deceived authorities, or where citizens have been involved in serious crimes abroad, such as human trafficking or terrorism.

== Citizenship and travel ==
Citizenship of Bosnia and Herzegovina conveys the right to obtain a Bosnian passport for the purposes of international travel. Visa requirements for Bosnian citizens are travel restrictions placed upon citizens of Bosnia and Herzegovina by the authorities of other states. In 2019, Bosnia and Herzegovina citizens had visa-free or visa on arrival access to 119 countries and territories, ranking the Bosnia and Herzegovina passport 46th in terms of travel freedom according to the Henley Passport Index. This figure is the lowest of all former Yugoslav states (with the exception of Kosovo).

The Bosnia and Herzegovina nationality is ranked number 77 as of 2018 in The Quality of Nationality Index (QNI). The ranking is considering internal factors such as peace & stability, economic strength, human development and external factors including travel freedom. This is once again the lowest of the successor states of Yugoslavia.
