= USD Bosna =

Multi-sport club in Sarajevo, Bosnia and Herzegovina

Coordinates: 43°51′26.5″N 18°24′44″E

Univerzitetsko sportsko društvo Bosna
- Nickname: Studenti
- Founded: 1947; 79 years ago

Univerzitetsko sportsko društvo Bosna (transl. University Sport Society Bosna), commonly abbreviated as USD Bosna, is a multi-sport club based in Sarajevo, Bosnia and Herzegovina.

== History ==
It was founded on December 7, 1947 to organize the existing student sports clubs in Sarajevo. USD Bosna is the largest sport society in SR Bosnia with teams in 19 different sports. The most successful teams are basketball club KK Bosna who won Euroleague Basketball in 1979 and the chess club ŠK Bosna that became the European champion four times.

From 333 Yugoslav Olympians, 53 were Bosna members.

== Clubs ==
There are 19 competitive clubs that are part of USD Bosna.

Sport	Team Name	Founded
Football	Fudbalski klub Bosna	1947
Volleyball	Odbojkaški klub Bosna	1947
Handball	Rukometni klub Bosna	1948
Athletics	Atletski klub Bosna	1949
Basketball	Košarkaški klub Bosna Royal	1951
Table tennis	Stonoteniski klub Bosna	1952
Wrestling	Hrvački klub Bosna	1957
Judo	Džudo klub Bosna	1960
Chess	Šahovski klub Bosna	1960
Swimming	Plivački klub Bosna	1960
Weight lifting	Klub dizača tegova Bosna	1960
Karate	Univerzitetski karate klub Bosna	1967
Diving	Ronilački klub Bosna	1976
Gymnastics	Gimnastički klub Bosna	1978
Rhythmic gymnastics	Klub ritmičke gimnastike Bosna	1979
Ice hockey	Hokej klub Bosna	1980
Skating	Klizačko koturaljski klub Bosna	1981
Water polo	Vaterpolo klub Bosna	1984
Tennis	Teniski klub Bosna	1985

== Defunct clubs ==
- Biciklistički klub Bosna
- Mačevalački klub Bosna
- Ski klub Bosna
