= AK Bosna =

Athletics club in Sarajevo, Bosnia and Herzegovina

- Founded: 1949
- Website: http://www.akbosna.ba/

AK Bosna or Atletski Klub Bosna is an athletics club from Sarajevo, Bosnia. The club is part of the University Sport Society USD Bosna (Bosnian: Univerzitetsko Sportsko Društvo Bosna). The club is part of the Athletic Federation of Bosnia and Herzegovina.

The club sends a number of its athletes to international tournaments such as the World Championships, European Championships, and Summer Olympics.

== History ==
The club was formed three times, going out of operations due to difficulties twice. It was first established in 1949, by students from the university departments of law, medicine and agronomy. The following year, in 1950, the club participated in its first competition. This lasted until 1952, when the club ceased its operations due to low activity. A number of the club's members went to AK Sarajevo.

In 1955 the club was established again. It lasted longer, until 1965. During this time the club participated in about a hundred competitions. Twice in this period AK Bosna was the champion of Bosnia and Herzegovina. It also achieved the title of the best up and coming club in Yugoslavia in 1963. The club's main rival continued to be AK Sarajevo.

On November 23, 1997, the club was established once again. So far it has been successful, as it has more support than it did before.
