= VK Bosna =

Waterpolo club from Sarajevo, Bosnia

- Founded: 1984
- League: Bosnia and Herzegovina Waterpolo League
- Based in: Sarajevo
- Stadium: Olimpijski Bazen Otoka

VK Bosna is a professional water polo club from Sarajevo, Bosnia. It was formed in 1984 and is the strongest waterpolo team in the Bosnia and Herzegovina Waterpolo League, which comprises five teams total. The club is part of the University Sport Society USD Bosna (Bosnian: Univerzitetsko Sportsko Društvo Bosna).

== History ==
Waterpolo in Sarajevo was not a major sport for some time. It mainly developed after World War II, but it ceased in 1967. In the mid 1980s plans developed to form such a club, and what became VK Bosna was organized in 1984. In late 1980s amid financial crisis in the former Yugoslavia, the club ceased to exist. In 2008 the club was re-established, and is the dominant such club in the country. Currently it has Senior and Junior sections.

In recent years the club has been cooperating with some of the high-ranking waterpolo clubs in the former Yugoslavia, such as PVK Jadran.
