= Visa policy of Bosnia and Herzegovina =

Policy on permits required to enter Bosnia and Herzegovina

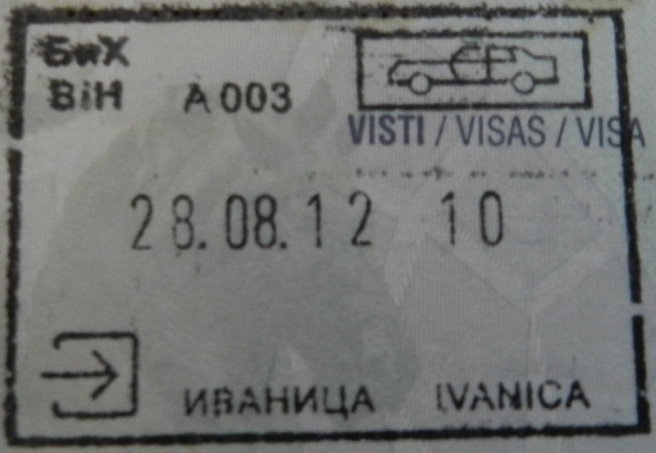
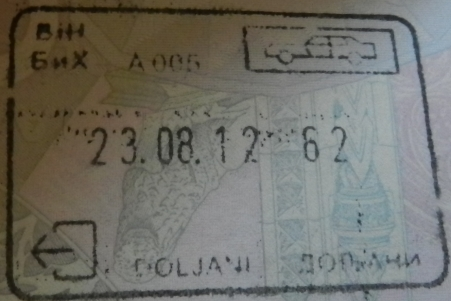
Entry and exit stamps

Visitors to Bosnia and Herzegovina must obtain a visa from one of the Bosnia and Herzegovina diplomatic missions unless they are citizens of one of the visa-exempt countries.

As an applicant country for membership in the European Union, Bosnia and Herzegovina maintains visa policy similar to the visa policy of the Schengen Area.

Bosnia and Herzegovina grants visa-free entry to all Schengen Annex II nationalities except Kosovo and it also grants visa-free entry to several additional countries - Azerbaijan, China, Kuwait, Qatar, Russia and Turkey.

== Visa policy map ==
Visa policy of Bosnia and Herzegovina Bosnia and Herzegovina Visa not required - may enter with an ID card (90 days) Visa not required (90 days) Visa not required (30 days) Visa required

== Visa exemption ==
=== Ordinary passports ===
Citizens of the following countries and territories (including resident stateless persons and refugees) may enter Bosnia and Herzegovina without a visa for the following period:

90 days

- Brazil^{1}
- Malaysia

90 days within any 180 days

- Albania^{ID}
- China^{A}
- Dominica
- Georgia
- Grenada
- Kiribati
- Marshall Islands
- Micronesia
- Moldova
- North Macedonia^{ID}
- Palau
- Peru
- Saint Lucia
- Saint Vincent and the Grenadines
- Solomon Islands
- Timor-Leste
- Tonga
- Trinidad and Tobago
- Tuvalu
- United Arab Emirates
- Vanuatu
- Vatican City

90 days within any 6 months

- All European Union member states^{ID}

- Andorra
- Antigua and Barbuda
- Argentina
- Azerbaijan
- Australia
- Bahamas
- Barbados
- Brunei
- Canada
- Chile
- Colombia
- Costa Rica
- El Salvador
- Guatemala
- Honduras
- Hong Kong^{A}
- Iceland^{ID}
- Israel
- Japan
- Kuwait
- Liechtenstein^{ID}
- Macau^{A}
- Mauritius
- Mexico
- Monaco^{ID}
- Montenegro^{ID}
- New Zealand
- Nicaragua
- Norway^{ID}
- Panama
- Paraguay
- Qatar
- Saint Kitts and Nevis
- San Marino^{ID}
- Serbia^{ID}
- Seychelles
- Singapore
- South Korea
- Switzerland^{ID}
- Taiwan
- Turkey
- United Kingdom
- United States
- Uruguay
- Venezuela

30 days within any 60 days

- Russia
- Ukraine

_{ID - May enter with an ID card (including Irish passport card) in lieu of a passport.}
_{A - For Chinese citizens with People's Republic of China passports, Hong Kong Special Administrative Region passports or Macao Special Administrative Region passports only.}
_{1 - The maximum length of stay must not exceed 180 days per year.}

==== Substitute visa ====
Holders of a valid multiple-entry visa issued by any Schengen Area member state, Cyprus, Ireland, Monaco or the United States of America may enter Bosnia and Herzegovina without a visa for a maximum stay of 30 days. They may stay for a maximum of 90 days within any 6-month period. This is not applicable to holders of Kosovar passport.

Holders of a residence permit issued by any Schengen Area member state, Albania, Cyprus, Ireland, Monaco, Montenegro, Serbia or the United States of America may enter Bosnia and Herzegovina without a visa for a maximum stay of 30 days. They may stay for a maximum of 90 days within any 6-month period. This is not applicable to holders of Kosovar passport.

=== Non-ordinary passports ===
In addition to countries whose citizens are visa-exempt, holders of diplomatic or official/service passports of Belarus, China, Cuba, Egypt, Indonesia, Iran, Jordan, Kazakhstan, Moldova, Pakistan, Saudi Arabia and Tunisia and holders of only diplomatic passports of Algeria and Armenia do not require a visa for Bosnia and Herzegovina.

Visa is also not required for stateless persons and refugees residing in countries whose citizens do not require a visa for Bosnia and Herzegovina (except for countries of Central and South America and the Caribbean).

== Visitors statistics ==
Most visitors arriving to Bosnia and Herzegovina on short-term basis are from the following countries of nationality:

Country	2018	2017
Croatia	116,823	96,986
Turkey	90,749	85,416
Serbia	88,797	77,867
Slovenia	65,002	55,527
Germany	50,402	34,612
South Korea	45,388	52,056
Italy	44,979	43,718
Poland	39,811	39,551
United Arab Emirates	35,255	33,896
United States	28,187	25,926
Austria	26,560	23,889
Total	1,052,898	923,221

== See also ==
- Visa requirements for Bosnia and Herzegovina citizens
- Visa policy of the Schengen Area
