= Bosnia and Herzegovina Water Polo League =

National water polo league

Bosnia and Herzegovina Waterpolo League is a national water polo league played in Bosnia and Herzegovina. It was launched on December 12, 2009. All participating teams are in Sarajevo.

== Teams Participating ==
- VK Bosna
- GKVS-Sarajevo Gradski klub vodenih sportova-Sarajevo
- UVK Mladost
- PVK Vidra
- VK Forma

== Winners ==
- 2009-2010 - VK Bosna

== Regular season ==
Rk	Team	GP	W	T	L	GF	GA	Pts
1.	VK Bosna	5	5	0	0	138	27	10
2.	GKVS-Sarajevo	4	3	0	1	57	71	6
3.	VK Forma	7	5	0	2	56	61	6
4.	UVK Mladost	5	1	0	4	42	99	2
5.	PVK Vidra	5	0	0	5	46	81	0

All results can be obtained at: https://web.archive.org/web/20190202130829/http://www.olimpijskibazensarajevo.ba/
