= UKK Bosna =

- Founded: 1967

UKK Bosna or Univerzitetski Karate Klub Bosna is a karate club from Sarajevo, Bosnia. The club was founded in May 1967. It is part of the University Sport Society USD Bosna (Bosnian: Univerzitetsko Sportsko Društvo Bosna). UKK Bosna is also a member of the Bosnian Karate Federation.

The club often participates in international competitions and events.

In particular, between 1984 and 1992 the club had much success on the international stage. This was complicated by the war that lasted between 1992 and 1995.

A Success Story

UKK Bosna operates within the University Sports Association "Bosna" and has been a pioneer of karate in Bosnia and Herzegovina since 1967. It was also the founding club behind the Karate Federation of BiH, established in 1972.

Beyond its active karate players, the club has been shaped by the contributions of its presidents over the years. From 1967 to 1992, these included Zdravko Bartal, Gojko Vukadinović, Suad Behmen, Marjan Maričić, Lazo Vukomanić, Božidar Anzulović, Ibrahim Uštović, Luka Popović, and Sladjan Ajvaz. From 1992 to the present, the club has been led by Ibrahim Uštović and Šačir Boškailo.

All of UKK Bosna's leaders hold advanced qualifications in karate and are elected from among the club's own members. Bosna is more than just a club or school. It functions as an institute, bringing together experts not only in karate but also in medicine, physiology, biomechanics, and psychology, all working toward the advancement of the sport.

University Karate Club Bosna Sarajevo is located at Hamze Hume no. 2, 71000 Sarajevo, Bosnia and Herzegovina. It is a member of both the Karate Federation of the Federation of Bosnia and Herzegovina and the Karate Federation of Bosnia and Herzegovina, both of which are recognized as national federations by the Ministry of Justice of BiH and the Civil Affairs Ministry's Sports Sector at the Council of Ministers of BiH.

UKK Bosna Sarajevo carries forward the karate tradition of the former Socialist Federal Republic of Yugoslavia and Bosnia and Herzegovina, dating back to 1967, and to 1972 when the KSBiH was founded. By building on the positive experience and successful tradition of previous generations, UKK Bosna has become one of the most active and successful clubs in BiH and the Balkans, encompassing over 20 clubs with more than 50,000 athletes, professionals, staff, and supporters..

== Honors ==
- European Champion:
  - Winners (1) : 2003
