= Bosnia and Herzegovina passport =

Travel document

Bosnia and Herzegovina Passport
- The front cover of a contemporary Bosnia and Herzegovina biometric passport
- Type: Passport
- Issued by: Bosnia and Herzegovina
- First issued: 14 October 2010 (biometric passport); 1 October 2014 (current version)
- Purpose: Identification
- Eligibility: Bosnia and Herzegovina citizenship
- Cost: 50 KM / €25 / $25

The Bosnia and Herzegovina passport is a passport issued to citizens of Bosnia and Herzegovina for international travel.

The Bosnian passport is one of the 5 passports with the most improved rating globally since 2006 in terms of number of countries that its holders may visit without a visa. It is the 42nd best passport in the world and allows the citizens of Bosnia and Herzegovina to travel to 122 countries without visa or visa on arrival.

== Biometric passports ==
One of the conditions for abolishment of visas of the Schengen states in 2011 for citizens of Bosnia and Herzegovina was the introduction of biometric passports (e-passport). Agency for Identification Documents, Registers and Data Exchange of Bosnia and Herzegovina (IDDEEA) and Ministry of Interior in Bosnia and Herzegovina tested the system of biometric passports from 4 July to 15 October 2009. No passport is issued until automated checks with the Ministry of Interior, Registrar's Offices and other security agencies in Bosnia and Herzegovina is performed. 162 institutions are involved in the process of issuing biometric passports, and therefore this makes the Bosnian e-passport one of the safest passports in the world. Originally it was announced that biometric passports would be tested until the end of 2009. On 15 July 2009, the Bosnian Minister of Civil Affairs announced that Bosnia and Herzegovina will begin issuing biometric passports on 15 October 2009, when a larger amount of passports will be delivered from German producer Bundesdruckerei. From 15 December 2010 holders of Bosnian passport travel visa free through all Schengen states. In June 2014 IDDEEA announced that Bosnia and Herzegovina will introduce third generation of biometric passports (SAC) in October 2014, whereby Bosnia and Herzegovina shall be one of few countries to have a color image imprinted in poly-carbonate page.

== Diplomatic passports ==
Holders of diplomatic passports of Bosnia and Herzegovina have visa waiver for certain countries for which obtaining pre-arrival visa for regular passport is required.

== Visa requirements ==
Visa requirements for Bosnia and Herzegovina citizens Bosnia and Herzegovina Visa free Visa issued upon arrival eVisa Visa available both on arrival or online Visa required prior to arrival Bosnian ID card valid

As of 2025, Bosnia and Herzegovina citizens had visa-free or visa on arrival access to 130 countries and territories, ranking the Bosnia and Herzegovina passport 43rd in terms of travel freedom according to the Henley visa restrictions index. Bosnia and Herzegovina passport is one of the 5 passports with the most improved rating since 2006.

== Gallery ==
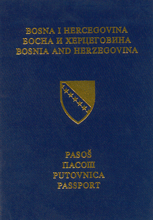
Old non-biometric passport (issued until October 15, 2009)

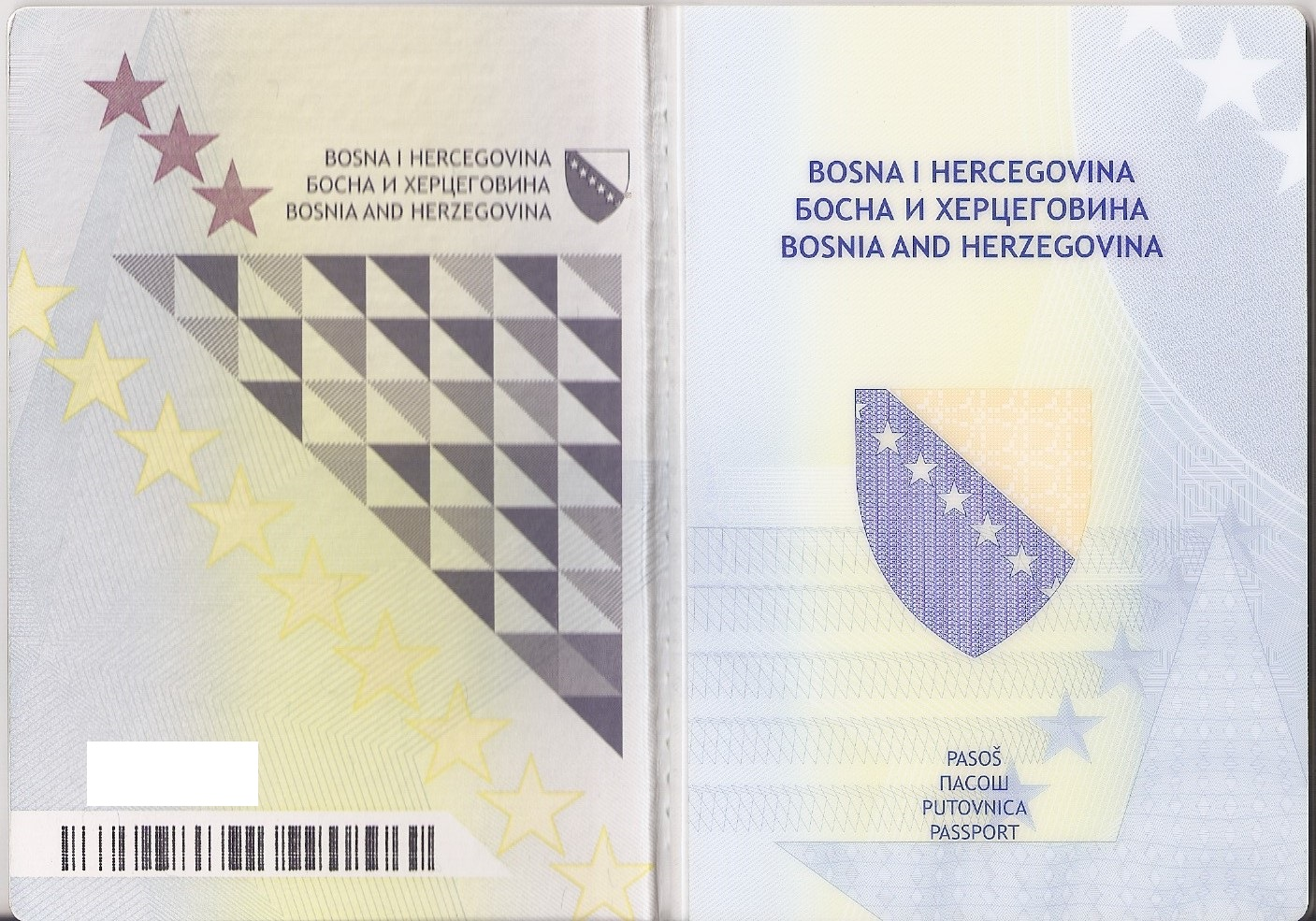
First and second page of a contemporary Bosnia and Herzegovina biometric passport

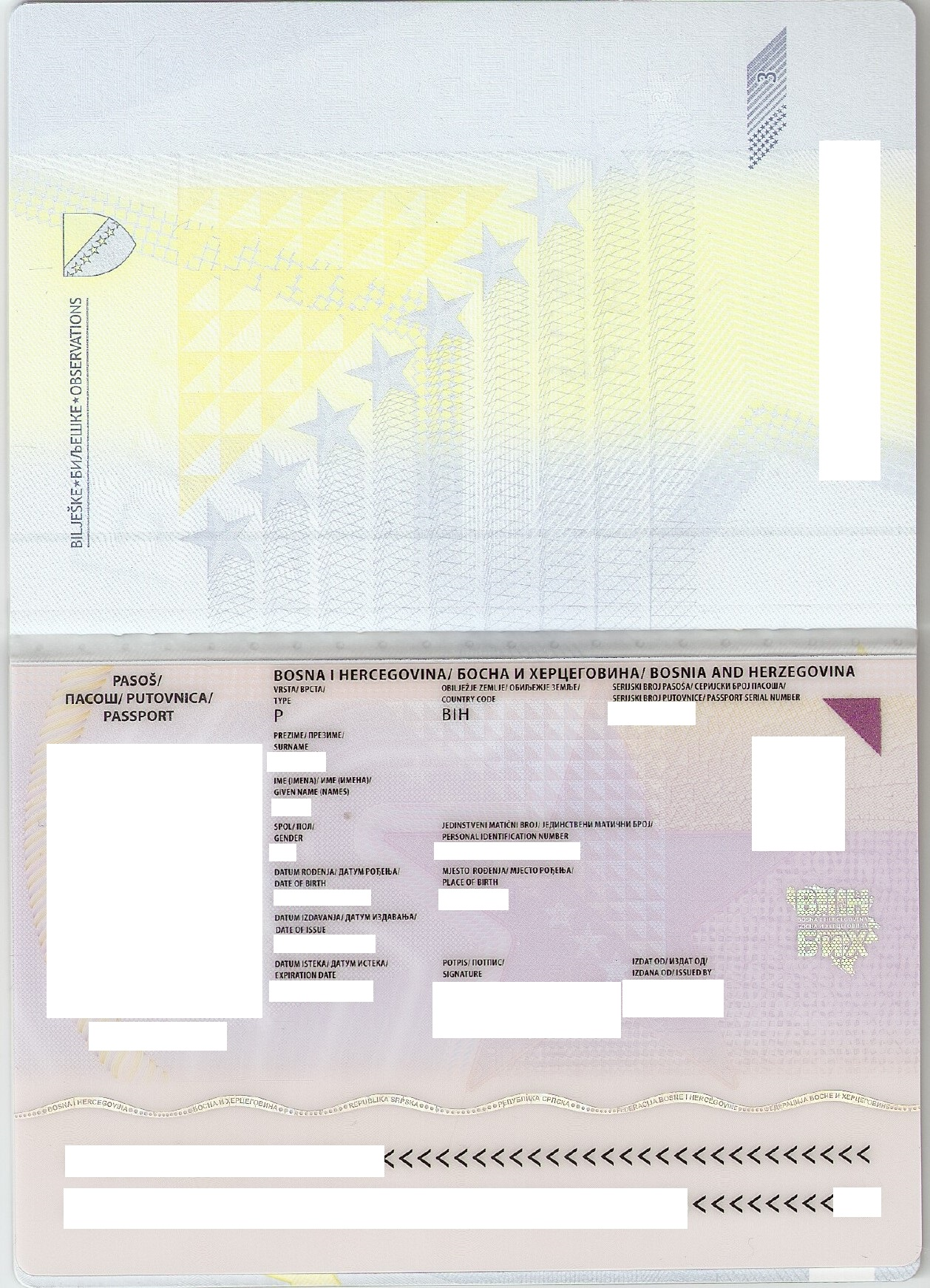
Data Page of a contemporary Bosnia and Herzegovina biometric passport

== See also ==
- Bosnia and Herzegovina identity card
- Visa requirements for Bosnia and Herzegovina citizens
