= ŠK Bosna =

Chess club from Bosnia and Herzegovina

- Founded: 1960
- Based in: Sarajevo
- Colours

ŠK Bosna, or Šahovski klub Bosna is a chess club from Sarajevo Canton, Bosnia and Herzegovina. The club is part of the University Sport Society USD Bosna (Bosnian: Univerzitetsko sportsko društvo Bosna). This club has achieved considerable success at competitions on the international stage.

Every May the club organizes an international chess tournament. In 2010 this was the 40th time it did so.

== History ==
The club was founded in 1960, under the name ŠK Iskra. After joining USD Bosna, the club changed its name to ŠK Bosna on July 15, 1976.

== Honours ==
=== Domestic competitions ===
- Yugoslavian Chess Club Cup:
  - Winners (7) 1983, 1984, 1985, 1986, 1987, 1990, 1991

=== European competitions ===
- European Chess Club Cup:
  - Winners (4) 1994, 1999, 2000, 2002

== Notable players ==
- (Russia) Garry Kasparov
- (Bosnia and Herzegovina) Predrag Nikolić
- (Bosnia and Herzegovina) Nebojša Nikolić
- (Netherlands) (Bosnia and Herzegovina) Ivan Sokolov
- (Croatia) (Bosnia and Herzegovina) Bojan Kurajica
