= European Chess Club Cup =

Annual chess tournament

The European Chess Club Cup is an annual chess tournament for club teams from Europe. It is organised by the European Chess Union. The competition is held with the Swiss system over seven rounds. It consists of two sections, open and women's, with each team fielding six and four players respectively at every match.

39th European Chess Club Cup for Men and 28th European Club Cup for Women was held in 2024.

== History ==
The tournament origins are from the former Yugoslavia, where chess club competitions were quite popular. In 1996, the women's competition was added.

== Winners ==
=== Men's event ===
Year	Location	Winner
1956	Belgrade	(Socialist Federal Republic of Yugoslavia) Partizan Belgrade
1976	Solingen	(Soviet Union) Burevestnik Moscow & (West Germany) Solingen SG
1979	Bad Lauterberg im Harz	(Soviet Union) Burevestnik Moscow
1982	Budapest	(Hungary) Spartacus Budapest
1984	Moscow	(Soviet Union) Trud Moscow
1986	Moscow	(Soviet Union) CSKA Moscow
1988	Rotterdam	(Soviet Union) CSKA Moscow
1990	Solingen	(Soviet Union) CSKA Moscow & (Germany) Solingen SG
1992	Solingen	(Germany) Bayern Munich
1993	Hilversum	(France) Lyon Oyonnax
1994	Lyon	(Bosnia and Herzegovina) Bosna & (France) Lyon Oyonnax
1995	Ljubljana	(Armenia) Yerevan city
1996	Budapest	(Russia) Sberbank Tatarstan Kazan
1997	Kazan	(Russia) Ladia Azov
1998	Belgrade	(Netherlands) Panfox Breda
1999	Bugojno	(Bosnia and Herzegovina) Bosna
2000	Neum	(Bosnia and Herzegovina) Bosna
2001	Panormos	(Russia) Nikel Norilsk
2002	Kallithea	(Bosnia and Herzegovina) Bosna
2003	Rethymno	(France) NAO Paris
2004	Çeşme	(France) NAO Paris
2005	Saint-Vincent	(Russia) Tomsk-400
2006	Fügen	(Russia) Tomsk-400
2007	Kemer	(Spain) Linex Magic-Mérida
2008	Kallithea	(Russia) Ural Sverdlovskaya oblast
2009	Ohrid	(Russia) Economist-SGSEU-1 Saratov
2010	Plovdiv	(Russia) Economist-SGSEU-1 Saratov
2011	Rogaška Slatina	(Russia) Saint-Petersburg Chess Federation
2012	Eilat	SOCAR Azerbaijan
2013	Rhodes	(Czech Republic) 1. Novoborský ŠK
2014	Bilbao	SOCAR Azerbaijan
2015	Skopje	(Russia) Siberia Novosibirsk
2016	Novi Sad	(North Macedonia) Alkaloid Skopje
2017	Antalya	Globus Russia
2018	Porto Carras	(Russia) Mednyi Vsadnik St.Petersburg
2019	Ulcinj	(Italy) Obiettivo Risarcimento Padova
2021	Struga	(Russia) Mednyi Vsadnik St.Petersburg
2022	Mayrhofen im Zillertal	(Czech Republic) 1. Novoborský ŠK
2023	Durres	(Norway) Offerspill Chess Club
2024	Vrnjačka Banja	(Czech Republic) 1. Novoborský ŠK
2025	Rhodes	(Romania) SuperChess
2026	Budva	(Turkey) Bayegan Pendik Chess Sports Club

=== Women's event ===
Year	Location	Winner
1996	Smederevska Palanka	(Federal Republic of Yugoslavia) Agrouniverzal Zemun & (Georgia (country)) Merani Tbilisi
1997	Rijeka	(Federal Republic of Yugoslavia) Goša Smederevska Palanka
1998	Wuppertal	(Romania) AEM-Luxten Timişoara
1999	Nova Gorica	(Ukraine) Rudenko School Kherson
2000	Halle	(Federal Republic of Yugoslavia) Agrouniverzal Zemun
2001	Belgrade	(Federal Republic of Yugoslavia) Agrouniverzal Zemun
2002	Antalya	(Federal Republic of Yugoslavia) BAS Belgrade
2003	Rethymno	(Serbia and Montenegro) Internet CG Podgorica
2004	Izmir	(Georgia (country)) NTN Tbilisi
2005	Saint-Vincent	(Georgia (country)) NTN Tbilisi
2006	Fügen	(Armenia) Mika Yerevan
2007	Kemer	(Monaco) CE Monte Carlo
2008	Kallithea	(Monaco) CE Monte Carlo
2009	Ohrid	(Russia) Spartak Vidnoe
2010	Plovdiv	(Monaco) CE Monte Carlo
2011	Rogaška Slatina	(Russia) AVS
2012	Eilat	(Monaco) CE Monte Carlo
2013	Rhodes	(Monaco) CE Monte Carlo
2014	Bilbao	(Georgia (country)) Batumi Nona
2015	Skopje	(Georgia (country)) Batumi Nona
2016	Novi Sad	(Monaco) CE Monte Carlo
2017	Antalya	(Georgia (country)) Batumi Nona
2018	Porto Carras	(Monaco) CE Monte Carlo
2019	Ulcinj	(Georgia (country)) Batumi Nona
2021	Struga	(Russia) South Ural
2022	Mayrhofen im Zillertal	(Austria) ASVOe Pamhagen
2023	Durres	(Romania) SuperChess
2024	Vrnjačka Banja	(Slovenia) TAJFUN-ŠK Ljubljana
2025	Rhodes	(Monaco) Cercle d'Echecs de Monte-Carlo
2026	Budva	(Monaco) Cercle d'Echecs de Monte-Carlo

== Results ==
- "FSI - Federazione Scacchistica Italiana". Archived from the original on 2017-09-15.
- "FSI - Federazione Scacchistica Italiana". Archived from the original on 2022-08-16.

== See also ==
- Chess Olympiad
- European Team Chess Championship
- Russia (USSR) vs Rest of the World
- Women's Chess Olympiad
- World Team Chess Championship
- World Chess Championship
- World Mind Sports Games
- Mind Sports Organisation
- Correspondence Chess Olympiad
