= Olimpijski Bazen Otoka =

Indoor water arena

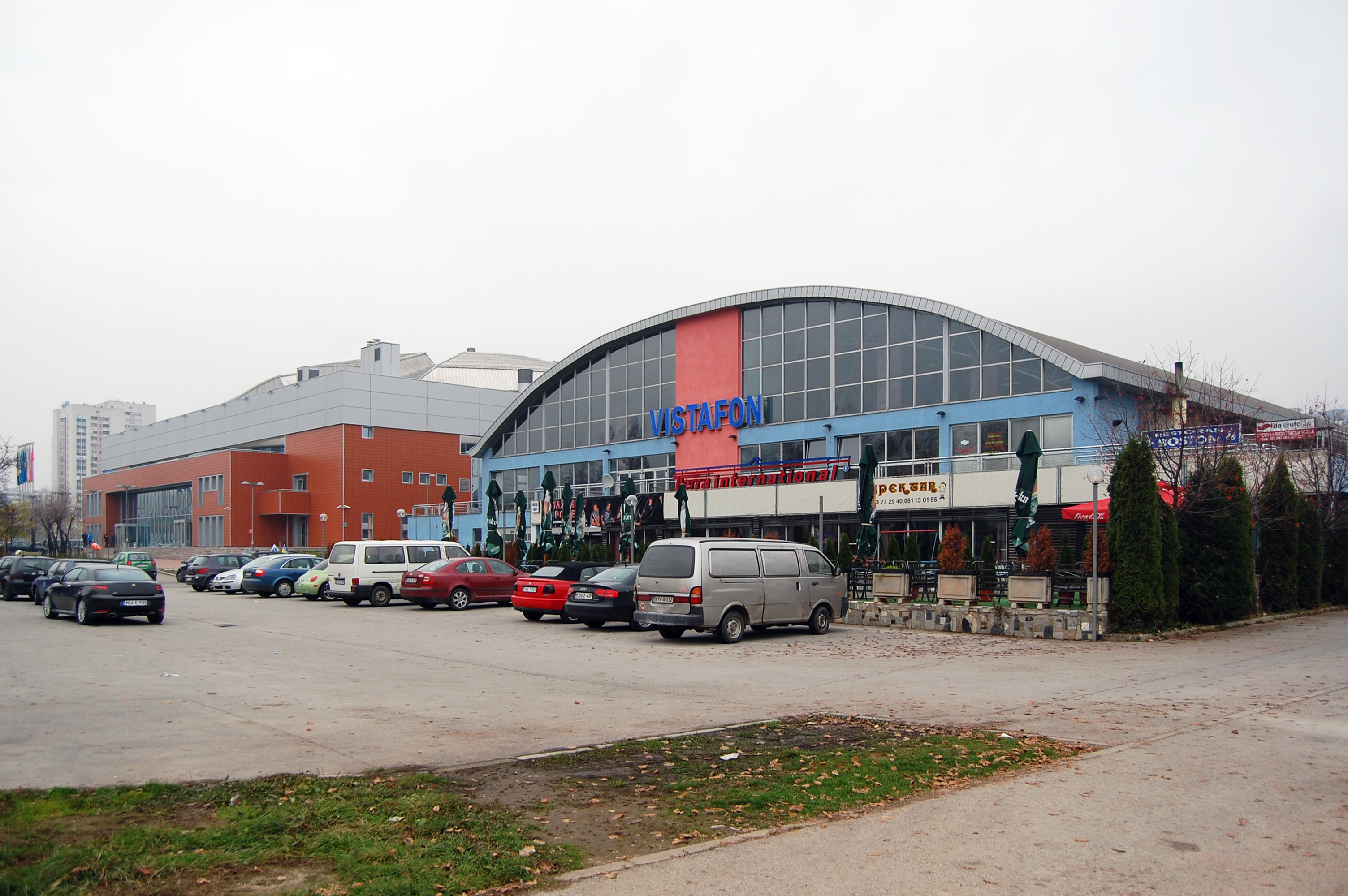
- Interactive map of Olimpijski Bazen Otoka
- Location: Bulevar Meše Selimovića 83b, Sarajevo 71000, Bosnia and Herzegovina
- Coordinates: 43°50′50.7″N 18°21′34.4″E
- Capacity: 558
- Surface: 3,600 meters^2

Construction
- Groundbreaking: 2005
- Opened: 2008
- Cost: 15.5 million KM

Tenant
- VK Bosna

Olimpijski Bazen Otoka is an indoor water arena in Sarajevo, Bosnia and Herzegovina. It is located in the Novi Grad district. Construction was finished in 2008, making it the first olympic sized swimming pool in Sarajevo. Construction started in 2005. The main pool has a dimension of 50 times 25 meters, with a depth of 2.2 meters. There are 10 lanes. There is an additional smaller pool in this building. The main pool is in regulations with FINA requirements.

The construction cost was 15.5 million convertible marks, 11.5 came from city Sarajevo, 3.5 from Canton Sarajevo, and 1 million came from the BH Government.
