= Identity card of Bosnia and Herzegovina =

Formal national Identity card of Bosnia and Herzegovina

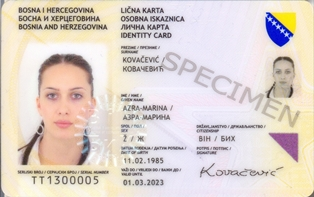
- Electronic Identity Card A side

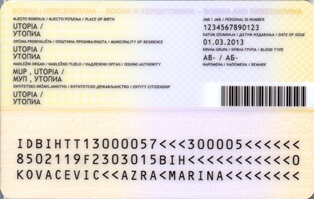
- Electronic Identity Card B side
- Type: Identity card, optional replacement for passport in the listed countries
- Issued by: Bosnia and Herzegovina
- Valid in: Bosnia and Herzegovina; Albania; Montenegro; North Macedonia; Serbia; Kosovo
- Eligibility: 16 years of age
- Cost: 18 KM / €9.20

The identity card of Bosnia and Herzegovina (Bosnian: Lična karta, Serbian: Лична карта, Croatian: Osobna iskaznica) is a compulsory identity document issued in Bosnia and Herzegovina. All citizens of Bosnia and Herzegovina who are residents of Bosnia and Herzegovina and are over the age of 15 have the right to apply for the national ID card; nevertheless, all citizens of Bosnia and Herzegovina that are over the age of 18 must have an identity card issued by the police (Ministarstvo unutarnjih poslova – MUP) by the city of residence.

On 1 March 2013, Bosnia and Herzegovina created a new electronic ID card costing 18 convertible marks (€9.20). Thanks to the production technology of electronic identity cards, risk of falsifying documents was reduced with the use of digital presentation and digital signature. Other protective elements in identity card are fully compliant with EU recommendations.

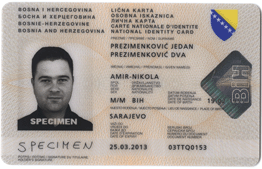
Bosnian-Herzegovinian Identity Card A side; issued until 1 March 2013

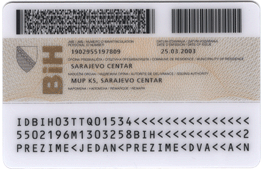
Bosnian-Herzegovinian Identity Card B side; issued until 1 March 2013

== Physical appearance ==
The identity card is made of plastic and rectangular in shape, resembling the shape of a credit card, measuring 86 × 54 millimetres in size. On the left side of the ID is the photograph of the bearer, whereas on the opposite side, a hologram is placed, with the country's coat of arms and name being visible. The top edge of the card, or "the header", bears the name of Bosnia and Herzegovina in Bosnian, Serbian, Croatian (in both Latin and Cyrillic alphabets) and English (BOSNA I HERCEGOVINA / БОСНА И ХЕРЦЕГОВИНА / BOSNIA AND HERZEGOVINA); and on its reverse, the name of the card is written in the same languages (LIČNA KARTA / OSOBNA ISKAZNICA / ЛИЧНА КАРТА / IDENTITY CARD). The ID card also had names in French, but it was removed when the new electronic ID card was created.

== Printed data ==
The descriptions of the fields where the citizen's information is visible is shown in Bosnian, Croatian (one field only), Serbian (Cyrillic) and English.

Front side

- Surname
- Name
- Sex
- Date of birth
- Date of expiry
- Citizenship
- Signature
- Identity Card Number

Back side

- Place of birth
- Municipality of residence
- Issued by
- Entity citizenship (optional)
- Personal ID Number (JMBG)
- Date of issue
- Blood type (optional)
- Remarks
- Machine-readable data

== Fines ==
Citizens over the age of 18 who do not have valid identification are subject to a fine in Bosnia and Herzegovina's convertible marks. If a citizen fails to produce a valid ID to a person of high rank (such as a police officer), the fine can be raised.

== Travel ==
A Bosnian-Herzegovinan ID Card is accepted as a travel document by the following countries:

- Albania
- Montenegro
- North Macedonia
- Serbia
- Kosovo

== See also ==
- Bosnia and Herzegovina passport
