= 2017–18 AC Milan season =

Milan
2017–18 season
- Chairman: Li Yonghong
- Head coach: Vincenzo Montella (until 27 November); Gennaro Gattuso (from 27 November)
- Stadium: San Siro
- Serie A: 6th
- Coppa Italia: Runners-up
- UEFA Europa League: Round of 16
- Top goalscorer: League: Patrick Cutrone (10); All: Patrick Cutrone (18)
Home colours	Away colours	Third colours

The 2017–18 season was the 84th season in Associazione Calcio Milan's history and their 82nd in the top-flight of Italian football. Milan competed in Serie A, UEFA Europa League and in the Coppa Italia. For the first time since the 2013–14 season, AC Milan competed in European competition, entering in the third qualifying round of the Europa League.

== Players ==
=== Squad information ===
No.	Player	Nat.	Position(s)	Date of birth (age)	Signed in	Contract ends	Signed from	Transfer fee	Notes
Goalkeepers
30	Marco Storari	(Italy)	GK	7 January 1977 (aged 41)	2017	2018	(Italy) Cagliari	Free	
90	Antonio Donnarumma	(Italy)	GK	7 July 1990 (aged 27)	2017	2021	(Greece) Asteras Tripolis	€300,000	From Youth system
99	Gianluigi Donnarumma	(Italy)	GK	25 February 1999 (aged 19)	2015	2021	(Italy) Milan Primavera	Free	From Youth system
Defenders
2	Davide Calabria	(Italy)	RB / LB	6 December 1996 (aged 21)	2015	2020	(Italy) Milan Primavera	Free	From Youth system
12	Andrea Conti	(Italy)	RB	2 March 1994 (aged 24)	2017	2022	(Italy) Atalanta	€24,000,000	
13	Alessio Romagnoli	(Italy)	CB	12 January 1995 (aged 23)	2015	2020	(Italy) Roma	€25,000,000	
15	Gustavo Gómez	(Paraguay)	CB	6 May 1993 (aged 25)	2016	2021	(Argentina) Lanús	€8,500,000	
17	Cristián Zapata	(Colombia)	CB	30 September 1986 (aged 31)	2012	2019	(Spain) Villarreal	€6,000,000	4th Vice Captain
19	Leonardo Bonucci	(Italy)	CB	1 May 1987 (aged 31)	2017	2022	(Italy) Juventus	€42,000,000	Captain
20	Ignazio Abate	(Italy)	RB	12 November 1986 (aged 31)	2009	2019	(Italy) Torino	€2,800,000	From Youth system, 2nd Vice Captain
22	Mateo Musacchio	(Argentina)	CB	26 August 1990 (aged 27)	2017	2021	(Spain) Villarreal	€18,000,000	
31	Luca Antonelli	(Italy)	LB	11 February 1987 (aged 31)	2015	2019	(Italy) Genoa	€4,500,000	From Youth system
68	Ricardo Rodriguez	(Switzerland)	LB	25 August 1992 (aged 25)	2017	2021	(Germany) VfL Wolfsburg	€15,000,000	
Midfielders
4	José Mauri	(Italy)	CM	16 May 1996 (aged 22)	2015	2019	(Italy) Parma	Free	
5	Giacomo Bonaventura	(Italy)	CM / LW	22 August 1989 (aged 28)	2014	2020	(Italy) Atalanta	€7,000,000	3rd Vice Captain
18	Riccardo Montolivo	(Italy)	DM / CM	18 January 1985 (aged 33)	2012	2019	(Italy) Fiorentina	Free	Vice Captain
21	Lucas Biglia	(Argentina)	DM	30 January 1986 (aged 32)	2017	2020	(Italy) Lazio	€17,000,000	
46	Matteo Gabbia	(Italy)	DM	21 October 1999 (aged 18)	2017	2018	(Italy) Milan Primavera	Free	From Youth system
73	Manuel Locatelli	(Italy)	DM / CM	8 January 1998 (aged 20)	2016	2020	(Italy) Milan Primavera	Free	From Youth system
79	Franck Kessié	(Ivory Coast)	CM	19 December 1996 (aged 21)	2017	2019	(Italy) Atalanta	Loan	
Forwards
7	Nikola Kalinić	(Croatia)	CF	5 January 1988 (aged 30)	2017	2021	(Italy) Fiorentina	Loan	
8	Suso	(Spain)	RW / CF	19 November 1993 (aged 24)	2015	2022	(England) Liverpool	€1,300,000	
9	André Silva	(Portugal)	CF	6 November 1995 (aged 22)	2017	2022	(Portugal) Porto	€38,000,000	
10	Hakan Çalhanoğlu	(Turkey)	LW	8 February 1994 (aged 24)	2017	2021	(Germany) Bayer Leverkusen	€20,000,000	
11	Fabio Borini	(Italy)	RW / LW	29 March 1991 (aged 27)	2017	2018	(England) Sunderland	Loan	
63	Patrick Cutrone	(Italy)	CF	3 January 1998 (aged 20)	2017	2021	(Italy) Milan Primavera	Free	From Youth system

== Transfers ==
=== Summer window ===
Deals officialised beforehand were effective starting from 1 July 2017.

==== In ====
Date	Pos.	Player	A.	Moving from	Fee	Notes	S.
30 May 2017	DF	(Argentina) Mateo Musacchio	26	(Spain) Villarreal	€18,000,000		
8 June 2017	DF	(Switzerland) Ricardo Rodríguez	24	(Germany) Wolfsburg	€15,000,000	Plus bonuses (€3.00M)	
12 June 2017	FW	(Portugal) André Silva	21	(Portugal) Porto	€38,000,000	Plus bonuses (€2.00M)	
3 July 2017	FW	(Turkey) Hakan Çalhanoğlu	23	(Germany) Bayer Leverkusen	€20,000,000	Plus bonuses (€4.00M)	
7 July 2017	MF	(Poland) Przemysław Bargiel	17	(Poland) Ruch Chorzów	€350,000	Plus bonuses (€0.15M), joined Primavera squad	
7 July 2017	DF	(Italy) Andrea Conti	23	(Italy) Atalanta	€24,000,000	Plus Matteo Pessina (€3.00M)	
12 July 2017	GK	(Italy) Antonio Donnarumma	27	(Greece) Asteras Tripolis	€300,000		
14 July 2017	DF	(Italy) Leonardo Bonucci	30	(Italy) Juventus	€42,000,000		
16 July 2017	MF	(Argentina) Lucas Biglia	31	(Italy) Lazio	€17,000,000	Plus bonuses (€3.00M)	
29 August 2017	FW	(Portugal) Tiago Dias	19	(Portugal) Benfica	Free	Plus 30% sell-on clause, joined Primavera squad	
31 August 2017	MF	(Spain) Sergio Sánchez Gioya	18	(Spain) Real Madrid Juvenil	Free	Joined Primavera squad	

==== On loan ====
Date	Pos.	Player	A.	Moving from	Fee	Notes	S.
2 June 2017	MF	(Ivory Coast) Franck Kessié	20	(Italy) Atalanta	€8,000,000	2 years loan with obligation to buy (€20.00M)	
30 June 2017	FW	(Italy) Fabio Borini	26	(England) Sunderland	€1,000,000	Loan with obligation to buy (€5.00M)	
22 August 2017	FW	(Croatia) Nikola Kalinić	29	(Italy) Fiorentina	€5,000,000	Loan with obligation to buy (€20.00M)	
29 August 2017	FW	(Norway) Jørgen Strand Larsen	17	(Norway) Sarpsborg 08 FF	Free	loan with option to buy, joined Primavera squad	

==== Loan returns ====
Date	Pos.	Player	A.	Moving from	Fee	Notes	S.
1 July 2017	GK	(Brazil) Gabriel	24	(Italy) Cagliari	Free		
1 July 2017	DF	(Colombia) Jherson Vergara	23	(Russia) Arsenal Tula	Free		
1 July 2017	MF	(Italy) (Argentina) José Mauri	21	(Italy) Empoli	Free		
1 July 2017	MF	(Argentina) Juan Mauri	28	(Italy) Paganese	Free		
1 July 2017	FW	(Morocco) (Italy) Hachim Mastour	19	(Netherlands) PEC Zwolle	Free		

Total spending :
▼€188.65M + (bonuses, option & obligation to buy) €60.15M = €248.80M

==== Out ====
Date	Pos.	Player	A.	Moving to	Fee	Notes	S.
23 May 2017	GK	(Spain) Diego López	35	(Spain) Espanyol	Undisclosed	From loan to definitive acquisition	
23 June 2017	MF	(Italy) Raul Zucchetti	19	(Italy) Virtus Entella	Undisclosed	From Primavera squad	
1 July 2017	MF	(Japan) Keisuke Honda	31	(Mexico) Pachuca	Free	End of contract	
1 July 2017	DF	(Senegal) Ameth Lo	20	(Italy) Lazio	Free	End of contract, after return from loan	
1 July 2017	MF	(Italy) Andrea Poli	27	(Italy) Bologna	Free		
1 July 2017	MF	(Montenegro) Cristian Hadžiosmanović	18	(Italy) Sampdoria	Free	From Primavera squad	
1 July 2017	FW	(Italy) Luca Vido	20	(Italy) Atalanta	€1,000,000	After return from loan, buy-back option included	
3 July 2017	DF	(Italy) Marco Curto	18	(Italy) Empoli	Free	From Primavera squad	
3 July 2017	FW	(Italy) Andrea Bianchimano	20	(Italy) Reggina	Undisclosed	From loan to definitive purchase	
7 July 2017	MF	(Italy) Matteo Pessina	20	(Italy) Atalanta	Free	Part-exchange in deal for Andrea Conti	
7 July 2017	MF	(Italy) Federico De Piano	19	(Italy) Vis Pesaro	Undisclosed	From Primavera squad	
7 July 2017	MF	(Slovakia) Juraj Kucka	30	(Turkey) Trabzonspor	€5,000,000		
17 July 2017	MF	(Italy) Lorenzo Cortinovis	18	(Italy) Pro Vercelli	Free	From Primavera squad	
17 July 2017	GK	(Italy) Carlo Maria Del Ventisette	17	(Italy) Varesina	Free	From Primavera squad	
20 July 2017	DF	(Italy) Mattia De Sciglio	24	(Italy) Juventus	€12,000,000	Plus bonuses (€0.50M)	
21 July 2017	DF	(Argentina) Leonel Vangioni	30	(Mexico) Monterrey	€2,000,000		
26 July 2017	FW	(Italy) Giacomo Beretta	25	(Italy) Foggia	Undisclosed	After return from loan	
1 August 2017	DF	(Brazil) (Italy) Rodrigo Ely	23	(Spain) Deportivo Alavés	€3,000,000	Plus 30% sell-on clause, after return from loan	
2 August 2017	MF	(Italy) Giovanni Crociata	19	(Italy) Crotone	€500,000	After return from loan	
2 August 2017	DF	(Italy) Ivan De Santis	20	(Italy) Ascoli	Undisclosed	After return from loan	
4 August 2017	DF	(Italy) Giorgio Altare	18	(Italy) Genoa	Free	From Primavera squad	
10 August 2017	DF	(Bulgaria) Vladislav Zhikov	18	(Italy) Livorno	Undisclosed	From Primavera squad	
18 August 2017	FW	(Italy) Davide Di Molfetta	21	(Italy) Vicenza	Undisclosed	After return from loan	
31 August 2017	MF	(Bosnia and Herzegovina) Mihael Modić	19	(Italy) Rende	Undisclosed	From Primavera squad	
31 August 2017	FW	(Italy) (Morocco) Zakaria Hamadi	19	(Switzerland) Chiasso	Undisclosed	From Primavera squad	
31 August 2017	FW	(Italy) (Ghana) Nigel Kyeremateng	17	(Italy) Novara	Undisclosed	From Primavera squad	
31 August 2017	FW	(Italy) Federico Marchesi	18	(Italy) Lazio	Free	From Primavera squad	
8 September 2017	FW	(Ivory Coast) Juvénal Agnero	18	(Italy) AZ Picerno	Free	From Primavera squad	

==== Loans ended ====
Date	Pos.	Player	A.	Moving to	Fee	Notes	S.
1 July 2017	LW	(Spain) Gerard Deulofeu	23	(England) Everton	Free	End of loan	
1 July 2017	MF	(Chile) Matías Fernández	31	(Italy) Fiorentina	Free	End of loan	
1 July 2017	LW	(Argentina) Lucas Ocampos	22	(France) Marseille	Free	End of loan	
1 July 2017	MF	(Croatia) Mario Pašalić	22	(England) Chelsea	Free	End of loan	

==== Out on loan ====
Date	Pos.	Player	A.	Moving to	Fee	Notes	S.
4 July 2017	GK	(Italy) Alessandro Plizzari	17	(Italy) Ternana	Free		
15 July 2017	MF	(Italy) Andrea Bertolacci	26	(Italy) Genoa	Free		
17 July 2017	DF	(Italy) Gian Filippo Felicioli	19	(Italy) Hellas Verona	Free	2 years loan with option to buy (€3.00M)	
18 July 2017	FW	(Italy) Gianluca Lapadula	27	(Italy) Genoa	€2,000,000	Loan with obligation to buy (€11.00M)	
10 August 2017	FW	(Italy) Gianmarco Zigoni	26	(Italy) Venezia	Free	Loan with obligation to buy (€0.40M)	
16 August 2017	FW	(Colombia) Carlos Bacca	30	(Spain) Villarreal	€2,500,000	Loan with option to buy (€15.50M)	
31 August 2017	FW	(Italy) Antonio Fabozzi	17	(Italy) Cremonese	Free	Buy & buy-back options included	
31 August 2017	DF	(Czech Republic) (Croatia) Stefan Simić	22	(Italy) Crotone	Free	After return from loan	
31 August 2017	MF	(Bosnia and Herzegovina) Andrej Modić	21	(Italy) Rende	Free	After return from loan	
31 August 2017	DF	(Italy) Mattia Cornaggia	17	(Italy) Torino	Free		
31 August 2017	FW	(Senegal) (France) M'Baye Niang	22	(Italy) Torino	€2,000,000	Loan with obligation to buy (€13.00M)	
8 September 2017	MF	(Argentina) José Sosa	32	(Turkey) Trabzonspor	€1,350,000	Loan with obligation to buy (€3.40M)	

Total income :
▲€31.35M + (bonuses, option & obligation to buy) €46.80M = €78.15M

=== Winter window ===
==== In ====
Date	Pos.	Player	A.	Moving from	Fee	Notes	S.
18 January 2018	MF	(Croatia) Antonio Mionić	16	(Croatia) NK Istra 1961	Undisclosed	Joined Allievi Nazionali team	
15 March 2018	MF	(Italy) Emanuele Torrasi	18	(Italy) Milan Primavera	Free	Signed a 4-year contract extension	
17 March 2018	FW	(Brazil) Nathan Soares	18	Free Agent	Free	Joined Primavera team	

Total spending :
▼ Undisclosed

==== Out ====
Date	Pos.	Player	A.	Moving to	Fee	Notes	S.
14 January 2018	MF	(Argentina) José Sosa	32	(Turkey) Trabzonspor	€3,400,000	From loan to definitive purchase	
26 January 2018	MF	(Bosnia and Herzegovina) Andrej Modić	21	(Bosnia and Herzegovina) Željezničar	Free	After return from loan	
30 January 2018	DF	(Italy) (Argentina) Gabriel Paletta	31	(China) Jiangsu Suning	Free	After contract termination	

==== Out on loan ====
Date	Pos.	Player	A.	Moving to	Fee	Notes	S.
30 January 2018	MF	(Italy) Niccolò Zanellato	19	(Italy) Crotone	Free	With obligation to buy (€0.30M) plus 50% sell-on clause	
30 January 2018	GK	(Brazil) Gabriel	25	(Italy) Empoli	Free		
31 January 2018	DF	(Italy) Mattia Cornaggia	18	(Italy) Pro Piacenza	Free	After return from loan	

Total income :
▲€3.40M + (obligation to buy) €0.30M = €3.70M

== Pre-season ==
Win Draw Loss

=== Friendlies ===
11 July 2017	Lugano	0–4	Milan	Lugano, Switzerland
19:00 CEST (UTC+02:00)		Report	Cutrone 2'; Crociata 63'; Sosa 83'; Gómez 90+1'	Stadium: Cornaredo Stadium; Attendance: 7,000; Referee: Luca Gut (Switzerland)

9 August 2017	Milan	1–2	Real Betis	Catania, Italy
20:45 CEST (UTC+02:00)	Silva 75' (pen.)	Report	Fabián 67'; Sanabria 90' (pen.)	Stadium: Stadio Angelo Massimino; Attendance: 17,852; Referee: Daniele Doveri (Italy)

=== International Champions Cup ===
18 July 2017 2017 ICC (Asia)	Milan	1–3	Borussia Dortmund	Guangzhou, China
19:20 CST (UTC+08:00); 13:20 CEST (UTC+02:00)	Bacca 24', (yellow card) 26'	Report	Şahin 16'; Aubameyang 20' (pen.), 62'; Papastathopoulos (yellow card) 60'	Stadium: Guangzhou Higher Education Stadium; Attendance: 19,000; Referee: Zhang Lei (China)

22 July 2017 2017 ICC (Asia)	Bayern Munich	0–4	Milan	Shenzhen, China
17:35 CST (UTC+08:00); 11:35 CEST (UTC+02:00)	Rafinha (yellow card) 67'	Report	Kessié 14'; Cutrone 25', 43'; Çalhanoğlu (yellow card) 77', (goal) 85'	Stadium: Longgang Stadium; Attendance: 39,998; Referee: Ai Kun (China)
Note: The match was part of the 2017 Audi Football Summit and the 2017 Audi Summer Tour.

== Competitions ==
Win Draw Loss

=== Serie A ===
==== League table ====
Pos	Team	Pld	W	D	L	GF	GA	GD	Pts	Qualification or relegation
4	Internazionale	38	20	12	6	66	30	+36	72	Qualification to Champions League group stage
5	Lazio	38	21	9	8	89	49	+40	71 (Note: Lazio were deducted 1 point by the Italian Football Federation)	Qualification to Europa League group stage (Note: Since the winners of the 2017–18 Coppa Italia, Juventus, qualified for European competition based on league position, the spot awarded to the cup winners (Europa League group stage) was passed to the sixth-placed team and the spot awarded to the sixth-placed team (Europa League second qualifying round) was passed to the seventh-placed team.)
6	Milan (Note: Milan was originally banned from European competition due to violations against Financial Fair Play regulations. They appealed to the Court of Arbitration for Sport, and the ban was overturned on 20 July 2018.)	38	18	10	10	56	42	+14	64	Qualification to Europa League group stage
7	Atalanta	38	16	12	10	57	39	+18	60	Qualification to Europa League second qualifying round
8	Fiorentina	38	16	9	13	54	46	+8	57	

Source: Serie A, Soccerway
Rules for classification: 1) Points; 2) Head-to-head points; 3) Head-to-head goal difference; 4) Goal difference; 5) Goals scored; 6) Draw.

==== Results summary ====
Overall								Home						Away					
Pld	W	D	L	GF	GA	GD	Pts	W	D	L	GF	GA	GD	W	D	L	GF	GA	GD
38	18	10	10	56	42	+14	64	10	5	4	25	16	+9	8	5	6	31	26	+5

Last updated: 20 May 2018.
Source: Competitive matches

==== Results by round ====
Round	1	2	3	4	5	6	7	8	9	10	11	12	13	14	15	16	17	18	19	20	21	22	23	24	25	26	27	28	29	30	31	32	33	34	35	36	37	38
Ground	A	H	A	H	H	A	H	A	H	A	H	A	A	H	A	H	A	H	A	H	A	H	A	A	H	A	H	A	H	A	H	H	A	H	A	H	A	H
Result	W	W	L	W	W	L	L	L	D	W	L	W	L	D	D	W	L	L	D	W	W	W	D	W	W	W	D	W	W	L	D	D	D	L	W	W	D	W
Position	3	4	7	5	4	6	7	10	11	8	8	7	7	7	8	7	8	11	10	11	7	7	8	7	7	7	7	6	6	6	6	6	6	7	7	6	6	6

Updated to match(es) played on 20 May 2018. Source: Competitive matches
A = Away; H = Home; W = Win; D = Draw; L = Loss

==== Matches ====
20 August 2017 1	Crotone	0–3	Milan	Crotone
20:45 CEST (UTC+02:00)	Ceccherini (red card) 5'; Dussenne (yellow card) 90'	Report	Kessié 6' (pen.); Cutrone (yellow card) 9', (goal) 18'; Suso 23'; Locatelli (yellow card) 59'; Bonucci (yellow card) 69'	Stadium: Stadio Ezio Scida; Attendance: 13,478; Referee: Maurizio Mariani

27 August 2017 2	Milan	2–1	Cagliari	Milan
20:45 CEST (UTC+02:00)	Cutrone 10'; Kessié (yellow card) 55'; Suso 70'; Montolivo (yellow card) 89'	Report	João Pedro (yellow card) 18', (goal) 56'	Stadium: San Siro; Attendance: 49,525; Referee: Luca Pairetto

10 September 2017 3	Lazio	4–1	Milan	Rome
16:00 CEST (UTC+02:00)	Immobile 38' (pen.), 42', 48'; Luis Alberto 49'; Lulić (yellow card) 58'; Parolo (yellow card) 70' (yellow-red card) 90+3'	Report	Montolivo 56'; Bonaventura (yellow card) 88'	Stadium: Stadio Olimpico; Attendance: 30,000; Referee: Gianluca Rocchi

17 September 2017 4	Milan	2–1	Udinese	Milan
15:00 CEST (UTC+02:00)	Kalinić 22', 31'; Romagnoli (yellow card) 26'	Report	Barák (yellow card) 16'; Lasagna 28'; Samir (yellow card) 70'	Stadium: San Siro; Attendance: 49,473; Referee: Marco Guida

20 September 2017 5	Milan	2–0	SPAL	Milan
20:45 CEST (UTC+02:00)	Rodríguez 26' (pen.); Kessié 61' (pen.); Romagnoli (yellow card) 89'	Report	Schiattarella (yellow card) 66'; Schiavon (yellow card) 88'	Stadium: San Siro; Attendance: 45,343; Referee: Rosario Abisso

24 September 2017 6	Sampdoria	2–0	Milan	Genoa
12:30 CEST (UTC+02:00)	Zapata 72'; Álvarez 90+1'	Report	G. Donnarumma (yellow card) 72'; Bonucci (yellow card) 83'	Stadium: Stadio Luigi Ferraris; Attendance: 21,896; Referee: Paolo Valeri

1 October 2017 7	Milan	0–2	Roma	Milan
18:00 CEST (UTC+02:00)	Çalhanoğlu (yellow card) 33' (yellow-red card) 80'; Biglia (yellow card) 62'	Report	Džeko (yellow card) 51', (goal) 72'; Florenzi 77'	Stadium: San Siro; Attendance: 61,698; Referee: Luca Banti

15 October 2017 8	Internazionale	3–2	Milan	Milan
20:45 CEST (UTC+02:00)	Miranda (yellow card) 15'; Vecino (yellow card) 25'; Icardi 28', 63', 90' (pen.), (yellow card) 90+1'; Gagliardini (yellow card) 66'; Perišić (yellow card) 79'; Éder (yellow card) 90+4'	Report	Romagnoli (yellow card) 22'; Suso 56'; Handanović 81' (o.g.); Rodríguez (yellow card) 89'	Stadium: San Siro; Attendance: 78,328; Referee: Paolo Tagliavento

22 October 2017 9	Milan	0–0	Genoa	Milan
15:00 CEST (UTC+02:00)	Bonucci (red card) 25'	Report	Zukanović (yellow card) 40'; Taarabt (yellow card) 61'	Stadium: San Siro; Attendance: 47,219; Referee: Piero Giacomelli

25 October 2017 10	Chievo	1–4	Milan	Verona
20:45 CEST (UTC+02:00)	Hetemaj (yellow card) 14'; Birsa 61'; Meggiorini (yellow card) 83'	Report	Borini (yellow card) 12'; Suso 36'; Cesar 42' (o.g.); Çalhanoğlu 55', (yellow card) 69'; Kalinić 64'; Musacchio (yellow card) 65'	Stadium: Stadio Marc'Antonio Bentegodi; Attendance: 15,000; Referee: Marco Di Bello

28 October 2017 11	Milan	0–2	Juventus	Milan
18:00 CET (UTC+01:00)	Kessié (yellow card) 32'; Zapata (yellow card) 90+1'	Report	Higuaín 23', 63'	Stadium: San Siro; Attendance: 78,328; Referee: Paolo Valeri

5 November 2017 12	Sassuolo	0–2	Milan	Reggio Emilia
20:45 CET (UTC+01:00)	Acerbi (yellow card) 45+3'; Missiroli (yellow card) 89'	Report	Romagnoli 39', (yellow card) 45+3'; Bonucci (yellow card) 55'; Montolivo (yellow card) 64'; Suso 67'	Stadium: Mapei Stadium – Città del Tricolore; Attendance: 12,683; Referee: Antonio Damato

18 November 2017 13	Napoli	2–1	Milan	Naples
20:45 CET (UTC+01:00)	Insigne 33'; Zieliński 73'; Allan (yellow card) 90+4'; Albiol (yellow card) 90+5'	Report	Borini (yellow card) 5'; Romagnoli 90+1'	Stadium: Stadio San Paolo; Attendance: 36,557; Referee: Daniele Doveri

26 November 2017 14	Milan	0–0	Torino	Milan
15:00 CET (UTC+01:00)		Report	Burdisso (yellow card) 43'; Rincón (yellow card) 62'	Stadium: San Siro; Attendance: 53,923; Referee: Massimiliano Irrati

3 December 2017 15	Benevento	2–2	Milan	Benevento
12:30 CET (UTC+01:00)	Catadli (yellow card) 29'; Pușcaș 50'; Di Chiara (yellow card) 54'; Brignoli 90+5'; D'Alessandro (yellow card) 90+6'	Report	Romagnoli (yellow card) 24' (yellow-red card) 75'; Bonaventura 38'; Kalinić 57'; Rodríguez (yellow card) 71'; Kessié (yellow card) 89'; Abate (yellow card) 90+4'	Stadium: Stadio Ciro Vigorito; Attendance: 15,710; Referee: Maurizio Mariani

10 December 2017 16	Milan	2–1	Bologna	Milan
20:45 CET (UTC+01:00)	Bonaventura 10', 76'	Report	Verdi 23'	Stadium: San Siro; Attendance: 39,504; Referee: Marco Guida

17 December 2017 17	Hellas Verona	3–0	Milan	Verona
12:30 CET (UTC+01:00)	Caracciolo 24'; Zuculini (yellow card) 35'; Kean 55'; Büchel (yellow card) 59'; Nícolas (yellow card) 65'; Bessa 77'	Report	Borini (yellow card) 45+3'; Romagnoli (yellow card) 49'; Suso (red card) 90+1'	Stadium: Stadio Marc'Antonio Bentegodi; Attendance: 19,439; Referee: Daniele Orsato

23 December 2017 18	Milan	0–2	Atalanta	Milan
18:00 CET (UTC+01:00)	Cutrone (yellow card) 31'; Kessié (yellow card) 40'	Report	Cristante 32'; Iličić 71'	Stadium: San Siro; Attendance: 45,746; Referee: Michael Fabbri

30 December 2017 19	Fiorentina	1–1	Milan	Florence
12:30 CET (UTC+01:00)	Simeone 71'; Veretout (yellow card) 82'	Report	Romagnoli (yellow card) 39'; Çalhanoğlu 74'	Stadium: Stadio Artemio Franchi; Attendance: 30,213; Referee: Luca Banti

6 January 2018 20	Milan	1–0	Crotone	Milan
15:00 CET (UTC+01:00)	Biglia (yellow card) 45'; Bonucci 54'; Kalinić (yellow card) 90+4'	Report	Mandragora (yellow card) 20'; Martella (yellow card) 90+3'	Stadium: San Siro; Attendance: 42,533; Referee: Fabio Maresca

21 January 2018 21	Cagliari	1–2	Milan	Cagliari
18:00 CET (UTC+01:00)	Barella 8', (yellow card) 65' (yellow-red card) 88'; Deiola (yellow card) 72'; Pavoletti (yellow card) 81'; Cigarini (yellow card) 90+4'	Report	Kalinić (yellow card) 27'; Kessié 36' (pen.), 42'; Suso (yellow card) 45'; Rodríguez (yellow card) 56' (yellow-red card) 80'	Stadium: Sardegna Arena; Attendance: 15,235; Referee: Marco Guida

28 January 2018 22	Milan	2–1	Lazio	Milan
18:00 CET (UTC+01:00)	Cutrone 15'; Bonaventura 44'; Antonelli (yellow card) 65'; Abate (yellow card) 86'	Report	Marušić 20', (yellow card) 28'; Radu (yellow card) 25'; Milinković-Savić (yellow card) 41'; Lulić (yellow card) 51'; Bastos (yellow card) 85'; Parolo (yellow card) 90'	Stadium: San Siro; Attendance: 50,822; Referee: Massimiliano Irrati

4 February 2018 23	Udinese	1–1	Milan	Udine
15:00 CET (UTC+01:00)	Stryger Larsen (yellow card) 33'; G. Donnarumma 76' (o.g.); Danilo (yellow card) 85'	Report	Suso 9'; Calabria (yellow card) 41' (yellow-red card) 68'	Stadium: Stadio Friuli; Attendance: 23,758; Referee: Gianluca Manganiello

10 February 2018 24	SPAL	0–4	Milan	Ferrara
15:00 CET (UTC+01:00)	Šimić (yellow card) 30'; Mattiello (yellow card) 51'; Schiattarella (yellow card) 70'	Report	Cutrone 2', 65'; Kessié (yellow card) 17'; Biglia (yellow card) 40', (goal) 73'; Bonucci (yellow card) 81'; Borini 90'	Stadium: Stadio Paolo Mazza; Attendance: 13,000; Referee: Maurizio Mariani

18 February 2018 25	Milan	1–0	Sampdoria	Milan
20:45 CET (UTC+01:00)	Bonaventura 13', (yellow card) 71'	Report	Linetty (yellow card) 40'; Ferrari (yellow card) 54'; Verre (yellow card) 79'	Stadium: San Siro; Attendance: 46,594; Referee: Daniele Doveri

25 February 2018 26	Roma	0–2	Milan	Rome
20:45 CET (UTC+01:00)		Report	Cutrone 48'; Calabria 74'	Stadium: Stadio Olimpico; Attendance: 42,537; Referee: Paolo Silvio Mazzoleni

11 March 2018 28	Genoa	0–1	Milan	Genoa
18:00 CET (UTC+01:00)	Bertolacci (yellow card) 79'	Report	Silva 90+4'	Stadium: Stadio Luigi Ferraris; Attendance: 20,004; Referee: Michael Fabbri

18 March 2018 29	Milan	3–2	Chievo	Milan
15:00 CET (UTC+01:00)	Calhanoglu 10', (yellow card) 47'; Kessié (yellow card) 44'; Cutrone 52'; Biglia (yellow card) 74'; Silva 82'	Report	Depaoli (yellow card) 17'; Stępiński 33', (yellow card) 77'; Inglese 34'; Jaroszyński (yellow card) 55'; Giaccherini (yellow card) 61'; Cacciatore (yellow card) 90+4'	Stadium: San Siro; Attendance: 49,701; Referee: Maurizio Mariani

31 March 2018 30	Juventus	3–1	Milan	Turin
20:45 CEST (UTC+02:00)	Dybala 8'; Benatia (yellow card) 38'; Cuadrado 79'; Khedira 87'	Report	Bonucci 28'; Rodríguez (yellow card) 39'; Biglia (yellow card) 52'; Montolivo (yellow card) 82'	Stadium: Allianz Stadium; Attendance: 41,156; Referee: Paolo Mazzoleni

4 April 2018 27	Milan	0–0	Internazionale	Milan
18:30 CEST (UTC+02:00)	Suso (yellow card) 77'	Report	Cancelo (yellow card) 21'; Perišić (yellow card) 57'; Škriniar (yellow card) 58'; Candreva (yellow card) 71'	Stadium: San Siro; Attendance: 77,512; Referee: Marco Di Bello
Note: Postponed due to Fiorentina player Davide Astori's death; originally scheduled for 4 March 2018.

8 April 2018 31	Milan	1–1	Sassuolo	Milan
20:45 CEST (UTC+02:00)	Kessié (yellow card) 22'; Musacchio (yellow card) 74'; Bonucci (yellow card) 81'; Kalinić 86'	Report	Rogério (yellow card) 29'; Mazzitelli (yellow card) 36'; Politano 75'	Stadium: San Siro; Attendance: 43,140; Referee: Luca Pairetto

15 April 2018 32	Milan	0–0	Napoli	Milan
20:45 CEST (UTC+02:00)	Zapata (yellow card) 55'; Çalhanoğlu (yellow card) 90+1'	Report	Hysaj (yellow card) 64'; Koulibaly (yellow card) 90'	Stadium: San Siro; Attendance: 65,786; Referee: Luca Banti

18 April 2018 33	Torino	1–1	Milan	Turin
20:45 CEST (UTC+02:00)	De Silvestri (yellow card) 25' (yellow-red card) 90+3', (goal) 70'; Rincón (yellow card) 42'; Baselli (yellow card) 71'	Report	Bonaventura 9', (yellow card) 45'; Cutrone (yellow card) 79'; Locatelli (yellow card) 88'	Stadium: Stadio Olimpico Grande Torino; Attendance: 24,264; Referee: Fabio Maresca

21 April 2018 34	Milan	0–1	Benevento	Milan
20:45 CEST (UTC+02:00)	Locatelli (yellow card) 82'; Kessié (yellow card) 90+4'	Report	Iemmello 29'; Sagna (yellow card) 59'; Diabaté (yellow card) 75' (yellow-red card) 80'; Parigini (yellow card) 90+4'	Stadium: San Siro; Attendance: 47,655; Referee: Maurizio Mariani

29 April 2018 35	Bologna	1–2	Milan	Bologna
15:00 CEST (UTC+02:00)	Masina (yellow card) 52'; De Maio 74'	Report	Locatelli (yellow card) 23'; Çalhanoğlu 34'; Bonaventura 45+1'	Stadium: Stadio Renato Dall'Ara; Attendance: 24,263; Referee: Piero Giacomelli

5 May 2018 36	Milan	4–1	Hellas Verona	Milan
18:00 CEST (UTC+02:00)	Çalhanoğlu 10'; Cutrone 32'; Abate 49'; Borini (yellow card) 70', (goal) 89'	Report	Lee Seung-woo 85'	Stadium: San Siro; Attendance: 49,644; Referee: Fabrizio Pasqua

13 May 2018 37	Atalanta	1–1	Milan	Bergamo
18:00 CEST (UTC+02:00)	Masiello (yellow card) 13', (goal) 90+2'; De Roon (yellow card) 28'; Toloi (yellow card) 64', (red card) 65'; Gosens (yellow card) 73'; Iličić (yellow card) 86'	Report	Abate (yellow card) 17'; Kalinić (yellow card) 32'; Kessié 60'; Çalhanoğlu (yellow card) 66'; Romagnoli (yellow card) 69'; Montolivo (red card) 75'; Borini (yellow card) 87'; G. Donnarumma (yellow card) 90'	Stadium: Stadio Atleti Azzurri d'Italia; Attendance: 19,833; Referee: Marco Guida

20 May 2018 38	Milan	5–1	Fiorentina	Milan
18:00 CEST (UTC+02:00)	Çalhanoğlu 23', (yellow card) 34'; Kessié (yellow card) 26'; Cutrone 41', 59'; Kalinić 49'; Bonaventura 76'	Report	Simeone 20'; Pezzella (yellow card) 22'	Stadium: San Siro; Attendance: 56,968; Referee: Michael Fabbri

=== Coppa Italia ===
13 December 2017 Round of 16	Milan	3–0	Hellas Verona	Milan
20:45 CET (UTC+01:00)	Suso 23'; Romagnoli 30'; Cutrone 55'	Report	Zuculini (yellow card) 16'	Stadium: San Siro; Attendance: 9,263; Referee: Claudio Gavillucci

27 December 2017 Quarter-finals	Milan	1–0 (a.e.t.)	Internazionale	Milan
CET (UTC+01:00)	Locatelli (yellow card) 16'; Biglia (yellow card) 20'; Cutrone 104', (yellow card) 104'	Report	Škriniar (yellow card) 72'; Vecino (yellow card) 111'; Valero (yellow card) 116'	Stadium: San Siro; Attendance: 48,721; Referee: Marco Guida

31 January 2018 Semi-finals; First leg	Milan	0–0	Lazio	Milan
20:45 CET (UTC+01:00)	Borini (yellow card) 21'	Report	Radu (yellow card) 27'	Stadium: San Siro; Attendance: 17,724; Referee: Marco Guida

28 February 2018 Semi-finals; Second leg	Lazio	0–0 (a.e.t.) (0–0 agg.) (4–5 p)	Milan	Rome
20:45 CET (UTC+01:00)	Marušić (yellow card) 90+2'; Radu (yellow card) 103'; Milinković-Savić (yellow card) 103'	Report	Kessié (yellow card) 38'; Romagnoli (yellow card) 57'; Calabria (yellow card) 73'	Stadium: Stadio Olimpico; Attendance: 40,000; Referee: Gianluca Rocchi
	Penalties
	Immobile (penalty scored); Milinković-Savić (penalty missed); Lucas (penalty missed); Parolo (penalty scored); Felipe Anderson (penalty scored); Lulić (penalty scored); Luiz Felipe (penalty missed)		(penalty missed) Rodríguez; (penalty missed) Montolivo; (penalty scored) Bonaventura; (penalty scored) Borini; (penalty scored) Bonucci; (penalty scored) Çalhanoğlu; (penalty scored) Romagnoli

9 May 2018 Final	Juventus	4–0	Milan	Rome
21:00 CEST (UTC+02:00)	Benatia 56', 64'; Douglas Costa 61', (yellow card) 62'; Kalinić 76' (o.g.)	Report	Calabria (yellow card) 73'	Stadium: Stadio Olimpico; Attendance: 66,400; Referee: Antonio Damato

=== UEFA Europa League ===
==== Third qualifying round ====
27 July 2017 First leg	Universitatea Craiova (Romania)	0–1	(Italy) Milan	Drobeta-Turnu Severin, Romania
20:00 CEST (UTC+02:00)	Briceag (yellow card) 90+2'	Report	Rodríguez 44'; Kessié (yellow card) 77'	Stadium: Stadionul Municipal; Attendance: 14,438; Referee: Halis Özkahya (Turkey)

3 August 2017 Second leg	Milan (Italy)	2–0 (3–0 agg.)	(Romania) Universitatea Craiova	Milan, Italy
20:45 CEST (UTC+02:00)	Bonaventura 9'; Rodríguez (yellow card) 45'; Cutrone 52'; Zapata (yellow card) 62'	Report	Băluță (yellow card) 49'	Stadium: San Siro; Attendance: 65,763; Referee: Nikola Popov (Bulgaria)

==== Play-off round ====
17 August 2017 First leg	Milan (Italy)	6–0	(North Macedonia) Shkëndija	Milan, Italy
20:45 CEST (UTC+02:00)	Silva 13', 28'; Montolivo 25', 85'; Borini 67'; Antonelli 69'; Bonaventura (yellow card) 84'	Report	Cuculi (yellow card) 54'	Stadium: San Siro; Attendance: 40,613; Referee: Harald Lechner (Austria)

24 August 2017 Second leg	Shkëndija (North Macedonia)	0–1 (0–7 agg.)	(Italy) Milan	Skopje, Macedonia
20:45 CEST (UTC+02:00)		Report	Cutrone 13'; Romagnoli (yellow card) 23'; Zapata (yellow card) 31'	Stadium: Philip II Arena; Attendance: 25,600; Referee: István Kovács (Romania)

==== Group stage ====
Pos	Team	Pld	W	D	L	GF	GA	GD	Pts	Qualification	MIL	AEK	RJK	AW
1	(Italy) Milan	6	3	2	1	13	6	+7	11	Advance to knockout phase	—	0–0	3–2	5–1
2	(Greece) AEK Athens	6	1	5	0	6	5	+1	8	Advance to knockout phase	0–0	—	2–2	2–2
3	(Croatia) Rijeka	6	2	1	3	11	12	−1	7		2–0	1–2	—	1–4
4	Austria Wien	6	1	2	3	9	16	−7	5		1–5	0–0	1–3	—

Source: UEFA
Rules for classification: Group stage tiebreakers

14 September 2017 1	Austria Wien	1–5	(Italy) Milan	Vienna, Austria
19:00 CEST (UTC+02:00)	Borković 47'; Kadiri (yellow card) 58'	Report	Çalhanoğlu 7'; Silva 10', 20', 56'; Kessié (yellow card) 37'; Suso 63'	Stadium: Ernst-Happel-Stadion; Attendance: 31,409; Referee: Serdar Gözübüyük (Netherlands)

28 September 2017 2	Milan (Italy)	3–2	(Croatia) Rijeka	Milan, Italy
21:05 CEST (UTC+02:00)	Silva 14'; Musacchio 53'; Cutrone 90+4'	Report	Bradarić (yellow card) 43'; Elez (yellow card) 82', (goal) 90' (pen.); Acosty 84'	Stadium: San Siro; Attendance: 23,917; Referee: Orel Grinfeeld (Israel)

19 October 2017 3	Milan (Italy)	0–0	(Greece) AEK Athens	Milan, Italy
21:05 CEST (UTC+02:00)	Locatelli (yellow card) 37'	Report	Simões (yellow card) 28'; Mantalos (yellow card) 73'; Livaja (yellow card) 79'	Stadium: San Siro; Attendance: 20,812; Referee: Andreas Ekberg (Sweden)

2 November 2017 4	AEK Athens (Greece)	0–0	(Italy) Milan	Athens, Greece
19:00 CET (UTC+01:00)	Ćosić (yellow card) 58'	Report	Musacchio (yellow card) 18'; Locatelli (yellow card) 41'	Stadium: Olympic Stadium; Attendance: 40,538; Referee: Jorge Sousa (Portugal)

23 November 2017 5	Milan (Italy)	5–1	Austria Wien	Milan, Italy
21:05 CET (UTC+01:00)	Musacchio (yellow card) 23'; Rodríguez 27'; Silva 36', 70'; Cutrone 42', 90+3'	Report	Monschein 21', (yellow card) 54'; Salamon (yellow card) 35'	Stadium: San Siro; Attendance: 17,932; Referee: Andris Treimanis (Latvia)

7 December 2017 6	Rijeka (Croatia)	2–0	(Italy) Milan	Rijeka, Croatia
19:00 CET (UTC+01:00)	Puljić 7'; Maleš (yellow card) 43'; Gavranović 47'	Report	Silva (yellow card) 32'; Antonelli (yellow card) 66'; Locatelli (yellow card) 78'	Stadium: Stadion Rujevica; Attendance: 8,021; Referee: István Vad (Hungary)

==== Knockout phase ====
===== Round of 32 =====
15 February 2018 First leg	Ludogorets Razgrad (Bulgaria)	0–3	(Italy) Milan	Razgrad, Bulgaria
19:00 CET (UTC+01:00)	Lukoki (yellow card) 39'	Report	Abate (yellow card) 5'; Cutrone 45'; Rodríguez 64' (pen.); Borini 90+2'	Stadium: Ludogorets Arena; Attendance: 7,887; Referee: Milorad Mažić (Serbia)

22 February 2018 Second leg	Milan (Italy)	1–0 (4–0 agg.)	(Bulgaria) Ludogorets Razgrad	Milan, Italy
21:05 CET (UTC+01:00)	Borini 21'; Bonucci (yellow card) 86'	Report	Góralski (yellow card) 70'	Stadium: San Siro; Attendance: 17,453; Referee: Alberto Undiano Mallenco (Spain)

===== Round of 16 =====
8 March 2018 First leg	Milan (Italy)	0–2	(England) Arsenal	Milan, Italy
19:00 CET (UTC+01:00)		Report	Mkhitaryan 15'; Ramsey 45+4', (yellow card) 71'; Kolašinac (yellow card) 60'	Stadium: San Siro; Attendance: 72,821; Referee: Clément Turpin (France)

15 March 2018 Second leg	Arsenal (England)	3–1 (5–1 agg.)	(Italy) Milan	London, England
21:05 CET (UTC+01:00)	Welbeck 39' (pen.), 86'; Monreal (yellow card) 45+2'; Xhaka 71'	Report	Çalhanoğlu 35'; G. Donnarumma (yellow card) 39'; Romagnoli (yellow card) 42'; Borini (yellow card) 42'; Suso (yellow card) 61'	Stadium: Emirates Stadium; Attendance: 58,973; Referee: Jonas Eriksson (Sweden)

== Statistics ==
=== Appearances and goals ===
No.	Pos	Nat	Player	Total		Serie A		Coppa Italia		Europa League	
No.	Pos	Nat	Player	Apps	Goals	Apps	Goals	Apps	Goals	Apps	Goals
Goalkeepers
30	GK	(Italy) ITA	Marco Storari	2	0	0	0	0	0	2	0
90	GK	(Italy) ITA	Antonio Donnarumma	2	0	0	0	1	0	1	0
99	GK	(Italy) ITA	Gianluigi Donnarumma	53	0	38	0	4	0	11	0
Defenders
2	DF	(Italy) ITA	Davide Calabria	30	1	18+3	1	3+1	0	5	0
12	DF	(Italy) ITA	Andrea Conti	5	0	2	0	0	0	2+1	0
13	DF	(Italy) ITA	Alessio Romagnoli	42	3	27+1	2	5	1	9	0
15	DF	(Paraguay) PAR	Gustavo Gómez	1	0	0	0	0	0	0+1	0
17	DF	(Colombia) COL	Cristián Zapata	20	0	11+1	0	0	0	8	0
19	DF	(Italy) ITA	Leonardo Bonucci	51	2	35	2	5	0	10+1	0
20	DF	(Italy) ITA	Ignazio Abate	27	1	11+6	1	2	0	5+3	0
22	DF	(Argentina) ARG	Mateo Musacchio	22	1	12+3	0	0	0	6+1	1
31	DF	(Italy) ITA	Luca Antonelli	13	1	1+5	0	0+1	0	4+2	1
68	DF	(Switzerland) SUI	Ricardo Rodríguez	47	4	34	1	4	0	8+1	3
Midfielders
4	MF	(Italy) ITA	José Mauri	4	0	0+1	0	0	0	1+2	0
5	MF	(Italy) ITA	Giacomo Bonaventura	47	9	30+3	8	5	0	5+4	1
18	MF	(Italy) ITA	Riccardo Montolivo	26	3	12+6	1	1+2	0	5	2
21	MF	(Argentina) ARG	Lucas Biglia	42	1	24+4	1	8+1	0	5	0
46	MF	(Italy) ITA	Matteo Gabbia	1	0	0	0	0	0	0+1	0
57	MF	(Italy) ITA	Emanuele Torrasi	1	0	0+1	0	0	0	0	0
73	MF	(Italy) ITA	Manuel Locatelli	34	0	5+17	0	3	0	7+2	0
79	MF	(Ivory Coast) CIV	Franck Kessié	54	5	37	5	5	0	10+2	0
Forwards
7	FW	(Croatia) CRO	Nikola Kalinić	42	6	20+11	6	3+2	0	1+5	0
8	FW	(Spain) ESP	Suso	50	8	33+2	6	5	1	6+4	1
9	FW	(Portugal) POR	André Silva	40	10	7+17	2	1+1	0	10+4	8
10	FW	(Turkey) TUR	Hakan Çalhanoğlu	45	8	26+5	6	2+2	0	9+1	2
11	FW	(Italy) ITA	Fabio Borini	44	5	19+10	2	1+3	0	7+4	3
27	FW	(Italy) ITA	Riccardo Forte	1	0	0	0	0	0	0+1	0
63	FW	(Italy) ITA	Patrick Cutrone	46	18	17+11	10	3+2	2	12+1	6
Other
NN			Own goals	0	2	0	2	0	0	0	0
Players transferred out during the season
1	GK	(Brazil) BRA	Gabriel	0	0	0	0	0	0	0	0
29	DF	(Italy) ITA	Gabriel Paletta	1	0	0	0	0	0	1	0
45	MF	(Italy) ITA	Niccolò Zanellato	2	0	0	0	0	0	2	0
94	FW	(France) FRA	M'Baye Niang	2	0	0	0	0	0	2	0

Last updated: 20 May 2018
Source: Competitions

=== Goalscorers ===
Rank	No.	Pos	Nat	Name	Serie A	Coppa Italia	UEFA EL	Total
1	63	FW	(Italy)	Patrick Cutrone	10	2	6	18
2	9	FW	(Portugal)	André Silva	2	0	8	10
3	5	MF	(Italy)	Giacomo Bonaventura	8	0	1	9
4	8	FW	(Spain)	Suso	6	1	1	8
4	10	FW	(Turkey)	Hakan Çalhanoğlu	6	0	2	8
6	7	FW	(Croatia)	Nikola Kalinić	6	0	0	6
7	11	FW	(Italy)	Fabio Borini	2	0	3	5
7	79	MF	(Ivory Coast)	Franck Kessié	5	0	0	5
9	68	DF	(Switzerland)	Ricardo Rodríguez	1	0	3	4
10	13	DF	(Italy)	Alessio Romagnoli	2	1	0	3
10	18	MF	(Italy)	Riccardo Montolivo	1	0	2	3
12	19	DF	(Italy)	Leonardo Bonucci	2	0	0	2
13	2	DF	(Italy)	Davide Calabria	1	0	0	1
13	20	DF	(Italy)	Ignazio Abate	1	0	0	1
13	21	MF	(Argentina)	Lucas Biglia	1	0	0	1
13	22	DF	(Argentina)	Mateo Musacchio	0	0	1	1
13	31	DF	(Italy)	Luca Antonelli	0	0	1	1
Own goal					2	0	0	2
Totals					56	4	28	88

Last updated: 20 May 2018

=== Clean sheets ===
Rank	No.	Nat.	Player	Serie A	Coppa Italia	Europa League	Total
1	99	(Italy)	Gianluigi Donnarumma	12	3	6	21
2	90	(Italy)	Antonio Donnarumma	0	1	1	2
3	30	(Italy)	Marco Storari	0	0	1	1
Totals				12	4	8	24

Last updated: 20 May 2018

=== Disciplinary record ===
No.	Pos.	Nat.	Player	Serie A			Coppa Italia			Europa League			Total		
No.	Pos.	Nat.	Player	Booked	(yellow card) (yellow-red card)	Sent off (straight red)	Booked	(yellow card) (yellow-red card)	Sent off (straight red)	Booked	(yellow card) (yellow-red card)	Sent off (straight red)	Booked	(yellow card) (yellow-red card)	Sent off (straight red)
30	GK	(Italy)	Marco Storari	0	0	0	0	0	0	0	0	0	0	0	0
90	GK	(Italy)	Antonio Donnarumma	0	0	0	0	0	0	0	0	0	0	0	0
99	GK	(Italy)	Gianluigi Donnarumma	2	0	0	0	0	0	1	0	0	3	0	0
2	DF	(Italy)	Davide Calabria	0	1	0	2	0	0	0	0	0	2	1	0
12	DF	(Italy)	Andrea Conti	0	0	0	0	0	0	0	0	0	0	0	0
13	DF	(Italy)	Alessio Romagnoli	7	1	0	1	0	0	2	0	0	10	1	0
15	DF	(Paraguay)	Gustavo Gómez	0	0	0	0	0	0	0	0	0	0	0	0
17	DF	(Colombia)	Cristián Zapata	2	0	0	0	0	0	2	0	0	4	0	0
19	DF	(Italy)	Leonardo Bonucci	5	0	1	0	0	0	1	0	0	6	0	1
20	DF	(Italy)	Ignazio Abate	3	0	0	0	0	0	1	0	0	4	0	0
22	DF	(Argentina)	Mateo Musacchio	2	0	0	0	0	0	2	0	0	4	0	0
29	DF	(Italy)	Gabriel Paletta ^{†}	0	0	0	0	0	0	0	0	0	0	0	0
31	DF	(Italy)	Luca Antonelli	1	0	0	0	0	0	1	0	0	2	0	0
68	DF	(Switzerland)	Ricardo Rodríguez	3	1	0	0	0	0	1	0	0	4	1	0
4	MF	(Italy)	José Mauri	0	0	0	0	0	0	0	0	0	0	0	0
5	MF	(Italy)	Giacomo Bonaventura	3	0	0	0	0	0	1	0	0	4	0	0
18	MF	(Italy)	Riccardo Montolivo	3	0	1	0	0	0	0	0	0	3	0	1
21	MF	(Argentina)	Lucas Biglia	5	0	0	1	0	0	0	0	0	6	0	0
45	MF	(Italy)	Niccolò Zanellato ^{†}	0	0	0	0	0	0	0	0	0	0	0	0
46	MF	(Italy)	Matteo Gabbia	0	0	0	0	0	0	0	0	0	0	0	0
73	MF	(Italy)	Manuel Locatelli	4	0	0	1	0	0	3	0	0	8	0	0
79	MF	(Ivory Coast)	Franck Kessié	9	0	0	1	0	0	2	0	0	12	0	0
7	FW	(Croatia)	Nikola Kalinić	3	0	0	0	0	0	0	0	0	3	0	0
8	FW	(Spain)	Suso	2	0	1	0	0	0	1	0	0	3	0	1
9	FW	(Portugal)	André Silva	0	0	0	0	0	0	1	0	0	1	0	0
10	FW	(Turkey)	Hakan Çalhanoğlu	5	1	0	0	0	0	0	0	0	5	1	0
11	FW	(Italy)	Fabio Borini	5	0	0	1	0	0	1	0	0	7	0	0
63	FW	(Italy)	Patrick Cutrone	3	0	0	0	0	0	0	0	0	3	0	0
Totals				67	4	3	7	0	0	20	0	0	94	4	3

^{†} Players with appearances who left for the rest of the season.
Last updated: 20 May 2018
