= Zucchetti (surname) =

Zucchetti is a surname. Notable people with the surname include:

- Francesco Zucchetti (1902–1980), Italian racing cyclist
- Lucia Zucchetti, Italian film editor
- Pietro Zucchetti (born 1981), Italian sailor
- Raul Zucchetti (born 1998), Italian footballer
