= 2017–18 UEFA Europa League qualifying =

Union of European Football Associations matches

The 2017–18 UEFA Europa League qualifying phase and play-off round began on 29 June and ended on 24 August 2017. A total of 156 teams competed in the qualifying phase and play-off round to decide 22 of the 48 places in the group stage of the 2017–18 UEFA Europa League.

All times were CEST (UTC+2).

== Round and draw dates ==
The schedule of the qualifying phase and play-off round was as follows (all draws were held at the UEFA headquarters in Nyon, Switzerland).

Round	Draw	First leg	Second leg
First qualifying round	19 June 2017	29 June 2017	6 July 2017
Second qualifying round	19 June 2017	13 July 2017	20 July 2017
Third qualifying round	14 July 2017	27 July 2017	3 August 2017
Play-off round	4 August 2017	17 August 2017	24 August 2017

Matches may also be played on Tuesdays or Wednesdays instead of the regular Thursdays due to scheduling conflicts.

== Format ==
In the qualifying phase and play-off round, each tie was played over two legs, with each team playing one leg at home. The team that scored more goals on aggregate over the two legs advanced to the next round. If the aggregate score was level, the away goals rule was applied, i.e. the team that scored more goals away from home over the two legs advanced. If away goals were also equal, then 30 minutes of extra time were played. The away goals rule was again applied after extra time, i.e. if there were goals scored during extra time and the aggregate score was still level, the visiting team advanced by virtue of more away goals scored. If no goals were scored during extra time, the tie was decided by a penalty shoot-out.

In the draws for each round, teams were seeded based on their UEFA club coefficients at the beginning of the season, with the teams divided into seeded and unseeded pots. A seeded team was drawn against an unseeded team, with the order of legs in each tie decided by draw. Due to the limited time between matches, the draws for the second and third qualifying rounds took place before the results of the previous round were known. For these draws (or in any cases where the result of a tie in the previous round was not known at the time of the draw), the seeding was carried out under the assumption that the team with the higher coefficient of an undecided tie advanced to this round, which means if the team with the lower coefficient was to advance, it simply took the seeding of its defeated opponent. Prior to the draws, UEFA may form "groups" in accordance with the principles set by the Club Competitions Committee, but they were purely for convenience of the draw and for ensuring that teams from the same association (or associations with political conflicts) were not drawn against each other, and did not resemble any real groupings in the sense of the competition.

== Teams ==
A total of 156 teams were involved in the qualifying phase and play-off round, including the 15 losers of the third qualifying round (10 in Champions Route, 5 in League Route) which entered the play-off round. The 22 winners of the play-off round advanced to the group stage to join the 16 teams which entered in the group stage and the 10 losers of the Champions League play-off round (5 in Champions Route, 5 in League Route).

Below were the participating teams (with their 2017 UEFA club coefficients), grouped by their starting rounds.

Key to colours
Winners of the play-off round advance to the group stage

Play-off round
Team	Coeff.
(Ukraine) Dynamo Kyiv	67.526
(Netherlands) Ajax	67.212
(Czech Republic) Viktoria Plzeň	40.635
(Austria) Red Bull Salzburg	40.570
(Belgium) Club Brugge	39.480
(Bulgaria) Ludogorets Razgrad	34.175
(Belarus) BATE Borisov	29.475
(Poland) Legia Warsaw	28.450
(Serbia) Partizan	16.075
(Norway) Rosenborg	12.665
(Moldova) Sheriff Tiraspol	11.150
(Greece) AEK Athens	6.580
(Iceland) FH	6.175
(Romania) Viitorul Constanța	5.870
(North Macedonia) Vardar	5.125

Third qualifying round
Team	Coeff.
(Russia) Zenit Saint Petersburg	87.106
(Spain) Athletic Bilbao	60.999
(Turkey) Fenerbahçe	51.840
(Czech Republic) Sparta Prague	48.135
(Italy) Milan	47.666
(Netherlands) PSV Eindhoven	46.212
(Portugal) Braga	37.366
(Belgium) Gent	35.480
(Greece) PAOK	35.080
(Russia) Krasnodar	32.106
(France) Bordeaux	29.333
(England) Everton	29.192
(France) Marseille	28.333
(Croatia) Dinamo Zagreb	26.050
(Germany) SC Freiburg	20.899
Austria Wien	17.070
(Greece) Panathinaikos	15.080
(Portugal) Marítimo	14.866
(Switzerland) Sion	14.415
(Ukraine) Oleksandriya	9.526
(Ukraine) Olimpik Donetsk	8.526
(Belgium) Oostende	8.480
(Romania) Dinamo București	6.370
(Romania) Universitatea Craiova	4.870
(Poland) Arka Gdynia	3.950

Second qualifying round
Team	Coeff.
(Turkey) Galatasaray	58.840
(Romania) Astra Giurgiu	17.870
(Croatia) Hajduk Split	11.550
(Cyprus) Apollon Limassol	10.710
(Czech Republic) Mladá Boleslav	10.135
(Switzerland) Luzern	9.415
(Denmark) Brøndby	8.800
(Azerbaijan) Gabala	7.800
(Scotland) Aberdeen	6.785
(Netherlands) Utrecht	6.712
(Austria) Sturm Graz	6.570
(Greece) Panionios	5.580
(Israel) Bnei Yehuda	4.875
(Belarus) Dynamo Brest	3.975
(Sweden) Östersunds FK	3.945
(Norway) Brann	3.665

First qualifying round
Team	Coeff.
(Israel) Maccabi Tel Aviv	23.375
(Denmark) Midtjylland	16.300
(Belarus) Dinamo Minsk	10.975
(Poland) Lech Poznań	10.950
(Finland) HJK	10.530
(Sweden) AIK	9.945
(Serbia) Vojvodina	9.075
(Hungary) Videoton	8.650
(Cyprus) AEL Limassol	8.210
(Belarus) Shakhtyor Soligorsk	7.475
(Slovakia) Slovan Bratislava	7.350
(Serbia) Red Star Belgrade	7.325
(Slovakia) Trenčín	6.850
(Albania) Skënderbeu	6.825
(Austria) Rheindorf Altach	6.570
(Scotland) St Johnstone	6.535
(Cyprus) AEK Larnaca	6.210
(Azerbaijan) Inter Baku	6.050
(Israel) Beitar Jerusalem	5.875
(Latvia) Ventspils	5.725
(Norway) Odd	5.665
(Kazakhstan) Kairat	5.550
(Croatia) Osijek	5.550
(Bosnia and Herzegovina) Sarajevo	5.300
(Iceland) KR	5.175
(Sweden) IFK Norrköping	4.945
(Moldova) Milsami Orhei	4.900
(Denmark) Lyngby	4.800
(Estonia) Nõmme Kalju	4.800
(Bosnia and Herzegovina) Željezničar	4.800
(Bulgaria) Botev Plovdiv	4.675
(Slovenia) Olimpija Ljubljana	4.625
(Malta) Valletta	4.550
(Liechtenstein) Vaduz	4.450
(Poland) Jagiellonia Białystok	4.450
(Bulgaria) Levski Sofia	4.425
(Iceland) Stjarnan	4.175
(Norway) Haugesund	4.165
(Slovenia) Domžale	4.125
(Kazakhstan) Ordabasy	4.050
(Estonia) Levadia Tallinn	4.050
(Hungary) Ferencváros	3.900
(Northern Ireland) Crusaders	3.900
(North Macedonia) Rabotnicki	3.875
(Scotland) Rangers	3.785
(Armenia) Shirak	3.775
(Moldova) Dacia Chișinău	3.650
(Montenegro) Mladost Podgorica	3.550
(Azerbaijan) Zira	3.550
(Kazakhstan) Irtysh	3.550
(Bosnia and Herzegovina) Široki Brijeg	3.550
(Luxembourg) Fola Esch	3.475
(Luxembourg) Differdange 03	3.475
(North Macedonia) Shkëndija	3.375
(Slovenia) Gorica	3.375
(Montenegro) Sutjeska	3.300
(Armenia) Pyunik	3.275
(Bulgaria) Dunav Ruse	3.175
(Albania) Partizani	3.075
(Serbia) Mladost Lučani	3.075
(Republic of Ireland) Shamrock Rovers	3.065
(Estonia) Flora	3.050
(Georgia (country)) Chikhura Sachkhere	3.025
(Gibraltar) Lincoln Red Imps	3.000
(Latvia) Jelgava	2.975
(Finland) SJK	2.780
(Republic of Ireland) Cork City	2.565
(Montenegro) Zeta	2.550
(Faroe Islands) B36	2.450
(Slovakia) Ružomberok	2.350
(Republic of Ireland) Derry City	2.315
(Latvia) Liepāja	2.225
(Moldova) Zaria Bălți	2.150
(Finland) VPS	2.030
(Iceland) Valur	1.925
(Hungary) Vasas	1.900
(Lithuania) Atlantas	1.825
(Lithuania) Sūduva	1.825
(Albania) Tirana	1.825
(Armenia) Gandzasar Kapan	1.775
(Georgia (country)) Torpedo Kutaisi	1.775
(Lithuania) Trakai	1.575
(San Marino) Tre Penne	1.566
(Wales) Bala Town	1.525
(Georgia (country)) Dinamo Batumi	1.525
(Faroe Islands) NSÍ	1.450
(Malta) Balzan	1.300
(Wales) Connah's Quay Nomads	1.275
(Wales) Bangor City	1.275
(Andorra) UE Santa Coloma	1.233
(Luxembourg) Progrès Niederkorn	1.225
(North Macedonia) Pelister	1.125
(San Marino) Folgore	1.066
(Malta) Floriana	1.050
(Northern Ireland) Coleraine	0.900
(Northern Ireland) Ballymena United	0.900
(Andorra) Sant Julià	0.733
(Faroe Islands) KÍ	0.700
(Gibraltar) St Joseph's	0.500
(Kosovo) Prishtina	0.000

Notes

1. ^{CL-CR} Losers of the third qualifying round (Champions Route).
2. ^{CL-LR} Losers of the third qualifying round (League Route).

== First qualifying round ==
The draw for the first qualifying round was held on 19 June 2017, 13:00 CEST.

=== Seeding ===
A total of 100 teams played in the first qualifying round. Prior to the draw the participating teams were placed in ten groups with five seeded and five unseeded teams, depending on their UEFA club coefficient. Teams were pre-assigned numbers by UEFA so that the draw could be held in one run for all groups.

Group 1		Group 2		Group 3	
Seeded	Unseeded	Seeded	Unseeded	Seeded	Unseeded
(Israel) Maccabi Tel Aviv (2) (Slovakia) Trenčín (1) (Azerbaijan) Inter Baku (3) (Armenia) Shirak (5) (Moldova) Dacia Chișinău (4)	(North Macedonia) Shkëndija (6) (Slovenia) Gorica (7) (Serbia) Mladost Lučani (8) (Albania) Tirana (9) (Georgia (country)) Torpedo Kutaisi (10)	(Poland) Lech Poznań (1) (Austria) Rheindorf Altach (3) (Kazakhstan) Kairat (2) (Bulgaria) Levski Sofia (4) (Azerbaijan) Zira (5)	(Luxembourg) Differdange 03 (7) (Montenegro) Sutjeska (6) (Georgia (country)) Chikhura Sachkhere (8) (Lithuania) Atlantas (9) (North Macedonia) Pelister (10)	(Serbia) Vojvodina (5) (Israel) Beitar Jerusalem (2) (Moldova) Milsami Orhei (3) (Montenegro) Mladost Podgorica (1) (Kazakhstan) Irtysh (4)	(Luxembourg) Fola Esch (8) (Bulgaria) Dunav Ruse (6) (Slovakia) Ružomberok (7) (Hungary) Vasas (9) (Armenia) Gandzasar Kapan (10)
Group 4		Group 5		Group 6	
Seeded	Unseeded	Seeded	Unseeded	Seeded	Unseeded
(Hungary) Videoton (1) (Slovakia) Slovan Bratislava (5) (Bulgaria) Botev Plovdiv (3) (Poland) Jagiellonia Białystok (4) (Kazakhstan) Ordabasy (2)	(Bosnia and Herzegovina) Široki Brijeg (9) (Armenia) Pyunik (7) (Albania) Partizani (8) (Georgia (country)) Dinamo Batumi (6) (Malta) Balzan (10)	(Cyprus) AEL Limassol (1) (Serbia) Red Star Belgrade (2) (Croatia) Osijek (3) (Bosnia and Herzegovina) Željezničar (4) (North Macedonia) Rabotnicki (5)	(Montenegro) Zeta (6) (San Marino) Tre Penne (7) (Andorra) UE Santa Coloma (8) (Malta) Floriana (9) (Gibraltar) St Joseph's (10)	(Albania) Skënderbeu (1) (Cyprus) AEK Larnaca (4) (Bosnia and Herzegovina) Sarajevo (3) (Malta) Valletta (2) (Scotland) Rangers (5)	(Gibraltar) Lincoln Red Imps (6) (Moldova) Zaria Bălți (8) (Luxembourg) Progrès Niederkorn (7) (San Marino) Folgore (9) (Andorra) Sant Julià (10)
Group 7		Group 8		Group 9	
Seeded	Unseeded	Seeded	Unseeded	Seeded	Unseeded
(Denmark) Midtjylland (4) (Latvia) Ventspils (2) (Liechtenstein) Vaduz (3) (Norway) Haugesund (1) (Slovenia) Domžale (5)	(Estonia) Flora (7) (Republic of Ireland) Derry City (6) (Iceland) Valur (9) (Wales) Bala Town (8) (Northern Ireland) Coleraine (10)	(Belarus) Dinamo Minsk (4) (Scotland) St Johnstone (2) (Slovenia) Olimpija Ljubljana (3) (Iceland) Stjarnan (1) (Northern Ireland) Crusaders (5)	(Republic of Ireland) Shamrock Rovers (10) (Latvia) Liepāja (7) (Finland) VPS (8) (Lithuania) Trakai (9) (Faroe Islands) NSÍ (6)	(Finland) HJK (3) (Norway) Odd (2) (Sweden) IFK Norrköping (1) (Estonia) Nõmme Kalju (5) (Hungary) Ferencváros (4)	(Latvia) Jelgava (6) (Faroe Islands) B36 (7) (Wales) Connah's Quay Nomads (8) (Northern Ireland) Ballymena United (9) (Kosovo) Prishtina (10)
Group 10					
Seeded	Unseeded				
(Sweden) AIK (1) (Belarus) Shakhtyor Soligorsk (2) (Iceland) KR (3) (Denmark) Lyngby (4) (Estonia) Levadia Tallinn (5)	(Finland) SJK (8) (Republic of Ireland) Cork City (7) (Lithuania) Sūduva (9) (Wales) Bangor City (6) (Faroe Islands) KÍ (10)				

=== Summary ===
The first legs were played on 29 June, and the second legs were played on 4 and 6 July 2017.

Team 1	Agg.	Team 2	1st leg	2nd leg
Maccabi Tel Aviv (Israel)	5–0	(Albania) Tirana	2–0	3–0
Mladost Lučani (Serbia)	0–5	(Azerbaijan) Inter Baku	0–3	0–2
Shirak (Armenia)	2–4	(Slovenia) Gorica	0–2	2–2
Shkëndija (North Macedonia)	7–0 (Note: Order of legs reversed after original draw.)	(Moldova) Dacia Chișinău	3–0	4–0
Trenčín (Slovakia)	8–1	(Georgia (country)) Torpedo Kutaisi	5–1	3–0
Kairat (Kazakhstan)	8–1	(Lithuania) Atlantas	6–0	2–1
Chikhura Sachkhere (Georgia (country))	1–2	(Austria) Rheindorf Altach	0–1	1–1
Zira (Azerbaijan)	4–1	(Luxembourg) Differdange 03	2–0	2–1
Levski Sofia (Bulgaria)	3–1	(Montenegro) Sutjeska	3–1	0–0
Lech Poznań (Poland)	7–0	(North Macedonia) Pelister	4–0	3–0
Beitar Jerusalem (Israel)	7–3	(Hungary) Vasas	4–3	3–0
Fola Esch (Luxembourg)	3–2	(Moldova) Milsami Orhei	2–1	1–1
Vojvodina (Serbia)	2–3	(Slovakia) Ružomberok	2–1	0–2
Irtysh (Kazakhstan)	3–0	(Bulgaria) Dunav Ruse	1–0	2–0
Mladost Podgorica (Montenegro)	4–0	(Armenia) Gandzasar Kapan	1–0	3–0
Široki Brijeg (Bosnia and Herzegovina)	2–0	(Kazakhstan) Ordabasy	2–0	0–0
Partizani (Albania)	1–4	(Bulgaria) Botev Plovdiv	1–3	0–1
Pyunik (Armenia)	1–9	(Slovakia) Slovan Bratislava	1–4	0–5
Dinamo Batumi (Georgia (country))	0–5	(Poland) Jagiellonia Białystok	0–1	0–4
Videoton (Hungary)	5–3	(Malta) Balzan	2–0	3–3
Red Star Belgrade (Serbia)	6–3	(Malta) Floriana	3–0	3–3
UE Santa Coloma (Andorra)	0–6	(Croatia) Osijek	0–2	0–4
Tre Penne (San Marino)	0–7	(North Macedonia) Rabotnicki	0–1	0–6
Željezničar (Bosnia and Herzegovina)	3–2	(Montenegro) Zeta	1–0	2–2
St Joseph's (Gibraltar)	0–10	(Cyprus) AEL Limassol	0–4	0–6
Valletta (Malta)	3–0	(San Marino) Folgore	2–0	1–0
Zaria Bălți (Moldova)	3–3 (6–5 p)	(Bosnia and Herzegovina) Sarajevo	2–1	1–2 (a.e.t.)
Rangers (Scotland)	1–2	(Luxembourg) Progrès Niederkorn	1–0	0–2
AEK Larnaca (Cyprus)	6–1	(Gibraltar) Lincoln Red Imps	5–0	1–1
Skënderbeu (Albania)	6–0	(Andorra) Sant Julià	1–0	5–0
Ventspils (Latvia)	0–1	(Iceland) Valur	0–0	0–1
Bala Town (Wales)	1–5	(Liechtenstein) Vaduz	1–2	0–3
Domžale (Slovenia)	5–2	(Estonia) Flora	2–0	3–2
Midtjylland (Denmark)	10–2	(Republic of Ireland) Derry City	6–1	4–1
Haugesund (Norway)	7–0	(Northern Ireland) Coleraine	7–0	0–0
St Johnstone (Scotland)	1–3	(Lithuania) Trakai	1–2	0–1
VPS (Finland)	2–0	(Slovenia) Olimpija Ljubljana	1–0	1–0
Crusaders (Northern Ireland)	3–3 (a)	(Latvia) Liepāja	3–1	0–2
Dinamo Minsk (Belarus)	4–1	(Faroe Islands) NSÍ	2–1	2–0
Stjarnan (Iceland)	0–2	(Republic of Ireland) Shamrock Rovers	0–1	0–1
Odd (Norway)	5–0	(Northern Ireland) Ballymena United	3–0	2–0
Connah's Quay Nomads (Wales)	1–3	(Finland) HJK	1–0	0–3
Nõmme Kalju (Estonia)	4–2	(Faroe Islands) B36	2–1	2–1
Ferencváros (Hungary)	3–0	(Latvia) Jelgava	2–0	1–0
IFK Norrköping (Sweden)	6–0	(Kosovo) Prishtina	5–0	1–0
Shakhtyor Soligorsk (Belarus)	1–2	(Lithuania) Sūduva	0–0	1–2
KR (Iceland)	2–0	(Finland) SJK	0–0	2–0
Levadia Tallinn (Estonia)	2–6	(Republic of Ireland) Cork City	0–2	2–4
Lyngby (Denmark)	4–0	(Wales) Bangor City	1–0	3–0
KÍ (Faroe Islands)	0–5	(Sweden) AIK	0–0	0–5

== Second qualifying round ==
The draw for the second qualifying round was held on 19 June 2017, 14:30 CEST (after the completion of the first qualifying round draw).

=== Seeding ===
A total of 66 teams played in the second qualifying round: 16 teams which entered in this round, and the 50 winners of the first qualifying round. Prior to the draw the participating teams were placed in six groups with five seeded and five unseeded teams (groups 1–3) or six seeded and six unseeded teams (groups 4–6), depending on their UEFA club coefficient. Teams were pre-assigned numbers by UEFA so that the draw could be held in one run for the groups with ten teams and another run for the groups with twelve teams. Since the draw for the second qualifying round took place before the results of the previous round were known, the seeding was carried out under the assumption that the team with the higher coefficient of an undecided tie would advance to this round, which meant if the team with the lower coefficient was to advance, it simply took the seeding of its defeated opponent.

Group 1		Group 2		Group 3	
Seeded	Unseeded	Seeded	Unseeded	Seeded	Unseeded
(Belarus) Dinamo Minsk (1) (Cyprus) Apollon Limassol (3) (Czech Republic) Mladá Boleslav (5) (Slovakia) Slovan Bratislava (4) (Israel) Beitar Jerusalem (2)	(Moldova) Zaria Bălți (10) (Denmark) Lyngby (7) (Bulgaria) Botev Plovdiv (9) (Republic of Ireland) Shamrock Rovers (8) (North Macedonia) Rabotnicki (6)	(Romania) Astra Giurgiu (5) (Sweden) AIK (2) (Albania) Skënderbeu (1) (Cyprus) AEK Larnaca (3) (Greece) Panionios (4)	(Kazakhstan) Kairat (6) (Bosnia and Herzegovina) Željezničar (9) (Republic of Ireland) Cork City (10) (Slovenia) Gorica (7) (Azerbaijan) Zira (8)	(Croatia) Hajduk Split (4) (Poland) Lech Poznań (2) (Denmark) Brøndby (3) (Hungary) Videoton (5) (Lithuania) Trakai (1)	(Sweden) IFK Norrköping (6) (Estonia) Nõmme Kalju (8) (Finland) VPS (10) (Bulgaria) Levski Sofia (7) (Norway) Haugesund (9)
Group 4		Group 5		Group 6	
Seeded	Unseeded	Seeded	Unseeded	Seeded	Unseeded
(Israel) Maccabi Tel Aviv (1) (Slovakia) Ružomberok (2) (Cyprus) AEL Limassol (4) (Azerbaijan) Gabala (3) (Lithuania) Sūduva (5) (Netherlands) Utrecht (6)	(Iceland) KR (8) (Malta) Valletta (12) (Poland) Jagiellonia Białystok (7) (Latvia) Liepāja (9) (Luxembourg) Progrès Niederkorn (10) (Norway) Brann (11)	(Turkey) Galatasaray (6) (Serbia) Red Star Belgrade (4) (Austria) Rheindorf Altach (1) (Azerbaijan) Inter Baku (2) (Iceland) Valur (3) (Norway) Odd (5)	(Luxembourg) Fola Esch (11) (Liechtenstein) Vaduz (9) (Slovenia) Domžale (7) (Belarus) Dynamo Brest (8) (Sweden) Östersunds FK (12) (Kazakhstan) Irtysh (10)	(Denmark) Midtjylland (6) (Finland) HJK (5) (Switzerland) Luzern (4) (Slovakia) Trenčín (3) (Scotland) Aberdeen (1) (Austria) Sturm Graz (2)	(Croatia) Osijek (10) (Israel) Bnei Yehuda (7) (Bosnia and Herzegovina) Široki Brijeg (8) (Hungary) Ferencváros (12) (North Macedonia) Shkëndija (9) (Montenegro) Mladost Podgorica (11)

Notes

1. ^{†} Winners of the first qualifying round whose identity was not known at the time of the draw. Teams in italics defeated a team with a higher coefficient in the first qualifying round, thus effectively taking the coefficient of their defeated opponent in the draw for the second qualifying round.

=== Summary ===
The first legs were played on 12 and 13 July, and the second legs were played on 20 July 2017.

Team 1	Agg.	Team 2	1st leg	2nd leg
Beitar Jerusalem (Israel)	1–5 (Note: Order of legs reversed after original draw.)	(Bulgaria) Botev Plovdiv	1–1	0–4
Apollon Limassol (Cyprus)	5–1	(Moldova) Zaria Bălți	3–0	2–1
Rabotnicki (North Macedonia)	1–4	(Belarus) Dinamo Minsk	1–1	0–3
Slovan Bratislava (Slovakia)	1–3	(Denmark) Lyngby	0–1	1–2
Shamrock Rovers (Republic of Ireland)	2–5	(Czech Republic) Mladá Boleslav	2–3	0–2
Željezničar (Bosnia and Herzegovina)	0–2	(Sweden) AIK	0–0	0–2
Cork City (Republic of Ireland)	0–2	(Cyprus) AEK Larnaca	0–1	0–1
Kairat (Kazakhstan)	1–3	(Albania) Skënderbeu	1–1	0–2
Panionios (Greece)	5–2	(Slovenia) Gorica	2–0	3–2
Astra Giurgiu (Romania)	3–1	(Azerbaijan) Zira	3–1	0–0
Haugesund (Norway)	3–4	(Poland) Lech Poznań	3–2	0–2
Brøndby (Denmark)	3–2	(Finland) VPS	2–0	1–2
IFK Norrköping (Sweden)	3–3 (3–5 p)	(Lithuania) Trakai	2–1	1–2 (a.e.t.)
Hajduk Split (Croatia)	3–1	(Bulgaria) Levski Sofia	1–0	2–1
Nõmme Kalju (Estonia)	1–4	(Hungary) Videoton	0–3	1–1
Maccabi Tel Aviv (Israel)	5–1	(Iceland) KR	3–1	2–0
Valletta (Malta)	1–3	(Netherlands) Utrecht	0–0	1–3
Ružomberok (Slovakia)	2–1	(Norway) Brann	0–1	2–0
Liepāja (Latvia)	1–2	(Lithuania) Sūduva	0–2	1–0
Gabala (Azerbaijan)	3–1	(Poland) Jagiellonia Białystok	1–1	2–0
Progrès Niederkorn (Luxembourg)	1–3	(Cyprus) AEL Limassol	0–1	1–2
Rheindorf Altach (Austria)	4–1	(Belarus) Dynamo Brest	1–1	3–0
Östersunds FK (Sweden)	3–1	(Turkey) Galatasaray	2–0	1–1
Inter Baku (Azerbaijan)	2–4	(Luxembourg) Fola Esch	1–0	1–4
Vaduz (Liechtenstein)	0–2	(Norway) Odd	0–1	0–1
Valur (Iceland)	3–5	(Slovenia) Domžale	1–2	2–3
Irtysh (Kazakhstan)	1–3	(Serbia) Red Star Belgrade	1–1	0–2
Aberdeen (Scotland)	3–1	(Bosnia and Herzegovina) Široki Brijeg	1–1	2–0
Ferencváros (Hungary)	3–7	(Denmark) Midtjylland	2–4	1–3
Sturm Graz (Austria)	3–1	(Montenegro) Mladost Podgorica	0–1	3–0
Shkëndija (North Macedonia)	4–2	(Finland) HJK	3–1	1–1
Trenčín (Slovakia)	1–3	(Israel) Bnei Yehuda	1–1	0–2
Osijek (Croatia)	3–2	(Switzerland) Luzern	2–0	1–2

== Third qualifying round ==
The draw for the third qualifying round was held on 14 July 2017, 13:00 CEST.

=== Seeding ===
A total of 58 teams played in the third qualifying round: 25 teams which entered in this round, and the 33 winners of the second qualifying round. Prior to the draw the participating teams were placed in one group with five seeded and five unseeded teams (group 1) and four groups with six seeded and six unseeded teams (groups 2–5), depending on their UEFA club coefficient. Teams were pre-assigned numbers by UEFA so that the draw could be held in one run for the group with ten teams and another run for the groups with twelve teams. Since the draw for the third qualifying round took place before the results of the previous round were known, the seeding was carried out under the assumption that the team with the higher coefficient of an undecided tie would advance to this round, which meant if the team with the lower coefficient was to advance, it simply took the seeding of its defeated opponent.

Group 1		Group 2		Group 3	
Seeded	Unseeded	Seeded	Unseeded	Seeded	Unseeded
(Turkey) Fenerbahçe (2) (Netherlands) PSV Eindhoven (1) (Russia) Krasnodar (3) (Greece) Panathinaikos (5) (North Macedonia) Shkëndija (4)	(Croatia) Osijek (10) (Azerbaijan) Gabala (7) (Denmark) Lyngby (8) (Austria) Sturm Graz (9) (Lithuania) Trakai (6)	(Spain) Athletic Bilbao (6) (Greece) PAOK (2) (Croatia) Dinamo Zagreb (4); Austria Wien (3) (Denmark) Midtjylland (5) (Czech Republic) Mladá Boleslav (1)	(Ukraine) Olimpik Donetsk (7) (Cyprus) AEL Limassol (8) (Albania) Skënderbeu (9) (Romania) Dinamo București (10) (Norway) Odd (11) (Poland) Arka Gdynia (12)	(Sweden) Östersunds FK (1) (Italy) Milan (2) (France) Bordeaux (3) (Israel) Maccabi Tel Aviv (4) (Croatia) Hajduk Split (5) (Poland) Lech Poznań (6)	(Denmark) Brøndby (12) (Hungary) Videoton (8) (Netherlands) Utrecht (10) (Luxembourg) Fola Esch (9) (Greece) Panionios (11) (Romania) Universitatea Craiova (7)
Group 4		Group 5			
Seeded	Unseeded	Seeded	Unseeded		
(Czech Republic) Sparta Prague (2) (Belgium) Gent (1) (England) Everton (4) (Romania) Astra Giurgiu (3) (Portugal) Marítimo (5) (Cyprus) Apollon Limassol (6)	(Ukraine) Oleksandriya (8) (Serbia) Red Star Belgrade (7) (Scotland) Aberdeen (10) (Austria) Rheindorf Altach (9) (Bulgaria) Botev Plovdiv (12) (Slovakia) Ružomberok (11)	(Russia) Zenit Saint Petersburg (1) (Portugal) Braga (2) (France) Marseille (3) (Germany) SC Freiburg (4) (Switzerland) Sion (5) (Belarus) Dinamo Minsk (6)	(Sweden) AIK (7) (Belgium) Oostende (8) (Israel) Bnei Yehuda (9) (Cyprus) AEK Larnaca (10) (Slovenia) Domžale (11) (Lithuania) Sūduva (12)		

Notes

1. ^{†} Winners of the second qualifying round whose identity was not known at the time of the draw. Teams in italics defeated a team with a higher coefficient in the second qualifying round, thus effectively taking the coefficient of their defeated opponent in the draw for the third qualifying round.

=== Summary ===
The first legs were played on 27 July, and the second legs were played on 2 and 3 August 2017.

Team 1	Agg.	Team 2	1st leg	2nd leg
PSV Eindhoven (Netherlands)	0–2	(Croatia) Osijek	0–1	0–1
Trakai (Lithuania)	2–4	(North Macedonia) Shkëndija	2–1	0–3
Krasnodar (Russia)	5–2	(Denmark) Lyngby	2–1	3–1
Sturm Graz (Austria)	2–3	(Turkey) Fenerbahçe	1–2	1–1
Panathinaikos (Greece)	3–1	(Azerbaijan) Gabala	1–0	2–1
Mladá Boleslav (Czech Republic)	3–3 (2–4 p)	(Albania) Skënderbeu	2–1	1–2 (a.e.t.)
Austria Wien	2–1	(Cyprus) AEL Limassol	0–0	2–1
Dinamo Zagreb (Croatia)	2–1	(Norway) Odd	2–1	0–0
Dinamo București (Romania)	1–4	(Spain) Athletic Bilbao	1–1	0–3
Olimpik Donetsk (Ukraine)	1–3	(Greece) PAOK	1–1	0–2
Arka Gdynia (Poland)	4–4 (a)	(Denmark) Midtjylland	3–2	1–2
Östersunds FK (Sweden)	3–1	(Luxembourg) Fola Esch	1–0	2–1
Bordeaux (France)	2–2 (a)	(Hungary) Videoton	2–1	0–1
Maccabi Tel Aviv (Israel)	2–0	(Greece) Panionios	1–0	1–0
Utrecht (Netherlands)	2–2 (a)	(Poland) Lech Poznań	0–0	2–2
Universitatea Craiova (Romania)	0–3	(Italy) Milan	0–1	0–2
Brøndby (Denmark)	0–2	(Croatia) Hajduk Split	0–0	0–2
Gent (Belgium)	2–4	(Austria) Rheindorf Altach	1–1	1–3
Astra Giurgiu (Romania)	0–1	(Ukraine) Oleksandriya	0–0	0–1
Everton (England)	2–0	(Slovakia) Ružomberok	1–0	1–0
Aberdeen (Scotland)	2–3	(Cyprus) Apollon Limassol	2–1	0–2
Red Star Belgrade (Serbia)	3–0	(Czech Republic) Sparta Prague	2–0	1–0
Botev Plovdiv (Bulgaria)	0–2	(Portugal) Marítimo	0–0	0–2
Bnei Yehuda (Israel)	1–2 (Note: Order of legs reversed after original draw.)	(Russia) Zenit Saint Petersburg	0–2	1–0
Marseille (France)	4–2	(Belgium) Oostende	4–2	0–0
SC Freiburg (Germany)	1–2	(Slovenia) Domžale	1–0	0–2
AEK Larnaca (Cyprus)	3–1	(Belarus) Dinamo Minsk	2–0	1–1
AIK (Sweden)	2–3	(Portugal) Braga	1–1	1–2 (a.e.t.)
Sūduva (Lithuania)	4–1	(Switzerland) Sion	3–0	1–1

== Play-off round ==
The draw for the play-off round was held on 4 August 2017, 13:00 CEST.

=== Seeding ===
A total of 44 teams played in the play-off round: the 29 winners of the third qualifying round, and the 15 losers of the 2017–18 UEFA Champions League third qualifying round. Prior to the draw the participating teams were placed in two groups with five seeded and five unseeded teams (groups 1–2) and two groups with six seeded and six unseeded teams (groups 3–4), depending on their UEFA club coefficient. Teams were pre-assigned numbers by UEFA so that the draw could be held in one run for the groups with ten teams and another run for the groups with twelve teams.

Group 1		Group 2	
Seeded	Unseeded	Seeded	Unseeded
(Ukraine) Dynamo Kyiv (2) (Italy) Milan (1) (Belgium) Club Brugge (4) (Russia) Krasnodar (3); Austria Wien (5)	(Portugal) Marítimo (6) (Serbia) Red Star Belgrade (7) (Greece) AEK Athens (8) (Croatia) Osijek (9) (North Macedonia) Shkëndija (10)	(Spain) Athletic Bilbao (1) (Austria) Red Bull Salzburg (2) (Portugal) Braga (3) (England) Everton (4) (Denmark) Midtjylland (5)	(Greece) Panathinaikos (10) (Croatia) Hajduk Split (8) (Cyprus) Apollon Limassol (9) (Iceland) FH (7) (Romania) Viitorul Constanța (6)
Group 3		Group 4	
Seeded	Unseeded	Seeded	Unseeded
(Netherlands) Ajax (1) (Turkey) Fenerbahçe (2) (Bulgaria) Ludogorets Razgrad (3) (Belarus) BATE Borisov (4) (Croatia) Dinamo Zagreb (5) (Israel) Maccabi Tel Aviv (6)	(Norway) Rosenborg (7) (Ukraine) Oleksandriya (8) (Albania) Skënderbeu (9) (Austria) Rheindorf Altach (10) (North Macedonia) Vardar (11) (Lithuania) Sūduva (12)	(Russia) Zenit Saint Petersburg (6) (Czech Republic) Viktoria Plzeň (5) (Greece) PAOK (3) (Poland) Legia Warsaw (4) (France) Marseille (2) (Serbia) Partizan (1)	(Moldova) Sheriff Tiraspol (8) (Hungary) Videoton (7) (Netherlands) Utrecht (10) (Cyprus) AEK Larnaca (9) (Slovenia) Domžale (11) (Sweden) Östersunds FK (12)

Notes

1. ^{†} Winners of the third qualifying round.
2. ^{CL} Losers of the Champions League third qualifying round.

=== Summary ===
The first legs were played on 16 and 17 August, and the second legs were played on 24 August 2017.

Team 1	Agg.	Team 2	1st leg	2nd leg
Milan (Italy)	7–0 (Note: Order of legs reversed after original draw.)	(North Macedonia) Shkëndija	6–0	1–0
Osijek (Croatia)	2–2 (a)	Austria Wien	1–2	1–0
Krasnodar (Russia)	4–4 (a)	(Serbia) Red Star Belgrade	3–2	1–2
Club Brugge (Belgium)	0–3	(Greece) AEK Athens	0–0	0–3
Marítimo (Portugal)	1–3	(Ukraine) Dynamo Kyiv	0–0	1–3
Panathinaikos (Greece)	2–4	(Spain) Athletic Bilbao	2–3	0–1
Apollon Limassol (Cyprus)	4–3	(Denmark) Midtjylland	3–2	1–1
FH (Iceland)	3–5	(Portugal) Braga	1–2	2–3
Everton (England)	3–1	(Croatia) Hajduk Split	2–0	1–1
Viitorul Constanța (Romania)	1–7	(Austria) Red Bull Salzburg	1–3	0–4
Vardar (North Macedonia)	4–1	(Turkey) Fenerbahçe	2–0	2–1
Ajax (Netherlands)	2–4	(Norway) Rosenborg	0–1	2–3
Rheindorf Altach (Austria)	2–3	(Israel) Maccabi Tel Aviv	0–1	2–2
BATE Borisov (Belarus)	3–2	(Ukraine) Oleksandriya	1–1	2–1
Dinamo Zagreb (Croatia)	1–1 (a)	(Albania) Skënderbeu	1–1	0–0
Ludogorets Razgrad (Bulgaria)	2–0	(Lithuania) Sūduva	2–0	0–0
Domžale (Slovenia)	1–4	(France) Marseille	1–1	0–3
Partizan (Serbia)	4–0	(Hungary) Videoton	0–0	4–0
Utrecht (Netherlands)	1–2	(Russia) Zenit Saint Petersburg	1–0	0–2 (a.e.t.)
Legia Warsaw (Poland)	1–1 (a)	(Moldova) Sheriff Tiraspol	1–1	0–0
Viktoria Plzeň (Czech Republic)	3–1	(Cyprus) AEK Larnaca	3–1	0–0
PAOK (Greece)	3–3 (a)	(Sweden) Östersunds FK	3–1	0–2

== Top goalscorers ==
There were 662 goals scored in 268 matches in the qualifying phase and play-off round, for an average of 2.47 goals per match.

Rank	Player	Team	Goals	Minutes played
1	(Russia) Maksim Maksimov	(Lithuania) Trakai	7	537
1	(Ghana) Richmond Boakye	(Serbia) Red Star Belgrade	7	707
3	(France) Valère Germain	(France) Marseille	5	335
3	(Serbia) Marko Šćepović	(Hungary) Videoton	5	482
3	(North Macedonia) Besart Ibraimi	(North Macedonia) Shkëndija	5	702
