= 2017–18 UEFA Europa League qualifying (third and play-off round matches) =

European football competition

This page summarises the matches of the third qualifying and play-off rounds of 2017–18 UEFA Europa League qualifying.

Times are CEST (UTC+2), as listed by UEFA (local times, if different, are in parentheses).

== Third qualifying round ==
=== Summary ===
The first legs were played on 27 July, and the second legs were played on 2 and 3 August 2017.

Team 1	Agg.	Team 2	1st leg	2nd leg
PSV Eindhoven (Netherlands)	0–2	(Croatia) Osijek	0–1	0–1
Trakai (Lithuania)	2–4	(North Macedonia) Shkëndija	2–1	0–3
Krasnodar (Russia)	5–2	(Denmark) Lyngby	2–1	3–1
Sturm Graz (Austria)	2–3	(Turkey) Fenerbahçe	1–2	1–1
Panathinaikos (Greece)	3–1	(Azerbaijan) Gabala	1–0	2–1
Mladá Boleslav (Czech Republic)	3–3 (2–4 p)	(Albania) Skënderbeu	2–1	1–2 (a.e.t.)
Austria Wien	2–1	(Cyprus) AEL Limassol	0–0	2–1
Dinamo Zagreb (Croatia)	2–1	(Norway) Odd	2–1	0–0
Dinamo București (Romania)	1–4	(Spain) Athletic Bilbao	1–1	0–3
Olimpik Donetsk (Ukraine)	1–3	(Greece) PAOK	1–1	0–2
Arka Gdynia (Poland)	4–4 (a)	(Denmark) Midtjylland	3–2	1–2
Östersunds FK (Sweden)	3–1	(Luxembourg) Fola Esch	1–0	2–1
Bordeaux (France)	2–2 (a)	(Hungary) Videoton	2–1	0–1
Maccabi Tel Aviv (Israel)	2–0	(Greece) Panionios	1–0	1–0
Utrecht (Netherlands)	2–2 (a)	(Poland) Lech Poznań	0–0	2–2
Universitatea Craiova (Romania)	0–3	(Italy) Milan	0–1	0–2
Brøndby (Denmark)	0–2	(Croatia) Hajduk Split	0–0	0–2
Gent (Belgium)	2–4	(Austria) Rheindorf Altach	1–1	1–3
Astra Giurgiu (Romania)	0–1	(Ukraine) Oleksandriya	0–0	0–1
Everton (England)	2–0	(Slovakia) Ružomberok	1–0	1–0
Aberdeen (Scotland)	2–3	(Cyprus) Apollon Limassol	2–1	0–2
Red Star Belgrade (Serbia)	3–0	(Czech Republic) Sparta Prague	2–0	1–0
Botev Plovdiv (Bulgaria)	0–2	(Portugal) Marítimo	0–0	0–2
Bnei Yehuda (Israel)	1–2 (Note: Order of legs reversed after original draw.)	(Russia) Zenit Saint Petersburg	0–2	1–0
Marseille (France)	4–2	(Belgium) Oostende	4–2	0–0
SC Freiburg (Germany)	1–2	(Slovenia) Domžale	1–0	0–2
AEK Larnaca (Cyprus)	3–1	(Belarus) Dinamo Minsk	2–0	1–1
AIK (Sweden)	2–3	(Portugal) Braga	1–1	1–2 (a.e.t.)
Sūduva (Lithuania)	4–1	(Switzerland) Sion	3–0	1–1

=== Matches ===
27 July 2017
19:00

PSV Eindhoven (Netherlands)	0–1	(Croatia) Osijek
	Report	Barišić 57' (pen.)

Philips Stadion, Eindhoven
Attendance: 32,000
Referee: Andrew Dallas (Scotland)
3 August 2017
20:45

Osijek (Croatia)	1–0	(Netherlands) PSV Eindhoven
Bočkaj 25'	Report

Stadion Gradski vrt, Osijek
Attendance: 15,000
Referee: Hugo Miguel (Portugal)

Osijek won 2–0 on aggregate.

27 July 2017
18:30

Trakai (Lithuania)	2–1	(North Macedonia) Shkëndija
Maksimov 2', 52'	Report	Stênio Júnior 39'

LFF Stadium, Vilnius
Attendance: 3,580
Referee: Neil Doyle (Republic of Ireland)
3 August 2017
17:00

Shkëndija (North Macedonia)	3–0	(Lithuania) Trakai
Ibraimi 29'; Hasani 42', 88'	Report

Stadion Mladost, Strumica (Note: Shkëndija played their qualifying rounds home matches at Stadion Mladost, Strumica, and play-off round home match at Philip II Arena, Skopje, instead of their regular stadium Ecolog Arena, Tetovo, due to renovation.)
Attendance: 2,057
Referee: Clayton Pisani (Malta)

Shkëndija won 4–2 on aggregate.

27 July 2017
19:00

Krasnodar (Russia)	2–1	(Denmark) Lyngby
Claesson 67'; Suleymanov 90+3'	Report	Kjær 64'

Krasnodar Stadium, Krasnodar
Attendance: 20,239
Referee: Christos Nicolaides (Cyprus)
3 August 2017
19:45

Lyngby (Denmark)	1–3	(Russia) Krasnodar
Rygaard Jensen 28'	Report	Pereyra 9', 22'; Mamayev 89' (pen.)

Lyngby Stadium, Kongens Lyngby
Attendance: 2,887
Referee: Sebastian Colțescu (Romania)

Krasnodar won 5–2 on aggregate.

27 July 2017
19:00

Sturm Graz (Austria)	1–2	(Turkey) Fenerbahçe
Hierländer 10'	Report	Maresic 29' (o.g.); Neustädter 35'

Liebenauer Stadium, Graz
Attendance: 15,323
Referee: Ola Hobber Nilsen (Norway)
3 August 2017
19:30

Fenerbahçe (Turkey)	1–1	(Austria) Sturm Graz
Dirar 32'	Report	Huspek 66'

Şükrü Saracoğlu Stadium, Istanbul
Attendance: 37,701
Referee: Bobby Madley (England)

Fenerbahçe won 3–2 on aggregate.

27 July 2017
20:30

Panathinaikos (Greece)	1–0	(Azerbaijan) Gabala
Molins 37' (pen.)	Report

Leoforos Alexandras Stadium, Athens
Attendance: 11,237
Referee: Juan Martínez Munuera (Spain)
3 August 2017
19:00

Gabala (Azerbaijan)	1–2	(Greece) Panathinaikos
Moledo 52' (o.g.)	Report	Lod 63'; Cabezas 66'

Bakcell Arena, Baku (Note: Gabala played their home matches at Bakcell Arena, Baku, instead of their regular stadium City Stadium, Qabala.)
Attendance: 11,000
Referee: Craig Pawson (England)

Panathinaikos won 3–1 on aggregate.

27 July 2017
18:00

Mladá Boleslav (Czech Republic)	2–1	(Albania) Skënderbeu
Chramosta 42'; Jánoš 87'	Report	Čmovš 86' (o.g.)

Městský stadion, Mladá Boleslav
Attendance: 4,487
Referee: Alan Mario Sant (Malta)
3 August 2017
20:00

Skënderbeu (Albania)	2–1 (a.e.t.)	(Czech Republic) Mladá Boleslav
Lilaj 55' (pen.); Plaku 83'	Report	Jánoš 18'
Penalties
Shehi (penalty scored); Latifi (penalty scored); Muzaka (penalty scored); Lilaj (penalty scored)	4–2	(penalty scored) Mareš; (penalty scored) Přikryl; (penalty missed) Rada; (penalty missed) Mebrahtu

Elbasan Arena, Elbasan (Note: Skënderbeu played their third qualifying and play-off rounds home matches at Elbasan Arena, Elbasan, instead of their regular stadium Skënderbeu Stadium, Korçë.)
Attendance: 4,850
Referee: Serhiy Boyko (Ukraine)

3–3 on aggregate; Skënderbeu won 4–2 on penalties.

27 July 2017
21:05

Austria Wien	0–0	(Cyprus) AEL Limassol
	Report

Ernst-Happel-Stadion, Vienna (Note: Austria Wien played their third qualifying round home match at Ernst-Happel-Stadion, Vienna, and play-off round home match at NV Arena, Sankt Pölten, instead of their regular stadium Franz Horr Stadium, Vienna, due to reconstruction.)
Attendance: 5,892
Referee: Antti Munukka (Finland)
2 August 2017
18:00

AEL Limassol (Cyprus)	1–2	Austria Wien
Aldair 60'	Report	Holzhauser 34' (pen.); Pires 90'

Antonis Papadopoulos Stadium, Larnaca (Note: AEL Limassol played their second and third qualifying rounds home matches at Antonis Papadopoulos Stadium, Larnaca, instead of their regular stadium Tsirio Stadium, Limassol.)
Attendance: 3,450
Referee: Artyom Kuchin (Kazakhstan)

Austria Wien won 2–1 on aggregate.

27 July 2017
20:45

Dinamo Zagreb (Croatia)	2–1	(Norway) Odd
Hodžić 31'; Fernandes 41'	Report	Mladenovic 20'

Stadion Maksimir, Zagreb
Attendance: 7,080
Referee: Manuel Schüttengruber (Austria)
3 August 2017
18:30

Odd (Norway)	0–0	(Croatia) Dinamo Zagreb
	Report

Skagerak Arena, Skien
Attendance: 4,270
Referee: Anatoliy Abdula (Ukraine)

Dinamo Zagreb won 2–1 on aggregate.

27 July 2017
19:30

Dinamo București (Romania)	1–1	(Spain) Athletic Bilbao
Rivaldinho 54'	Report	Laporte 21'

Arena Națională, Bucharest (Note: Dinamo București played their home match at Arena Națională, Bucharest, instead of their regular stadium Stadionul Dinamo, Bucharest.)
Attendance: 26,783
Referee: Tore Hansen (Norway)
3 August 2017
20:45

Athletic Bilbao (Spain)	3–0	(Romania) Dinamo București
García 24', 29'; Aduriz 86'	Report

San Mamés, Bilbao
Attendance: 41,845
Referee: Pavle Radovanović (Montenegro)

Athletic Bilbao won 4–1 on aggregate.

27 July 2017
18:30

Olimpik Donetsk (Ukraine)	1–1	(Greece) PAOK
Bilenkyi 49'	Report	Pedro Henrique 59'

Valeriy Lobanovskyi Dynamo Stadium, Kyiv (Note: Olimpik Donetsk played their home match at Valeriy Lobanovskyi Dynamo Stadium, Kyiv, instead of their regular stadium Olimpik Sports Complex, Donetsk, due to the war conditions in Eastern Ukraine.)
Attendance: 2,632
Referee: Alain Bieri (Switzerland)
3 August 2017
20:00

PAOK (Greece)	2–0	(Ukraine) Olimpik Donetsk
Mak 24'; Cimirot 45+1'	Report

Toumba Stadium, Thessaloniki
Attendance: 13,960
Referee: Ivaylo Stoyanov (Bulgaria)

PAOK won 3–1 on aggregate.

27 July 2017
20:00

Arka Gdynia (Poland)	3–2	(Denmark) Midtjylland
Marcus 31', 39' (pen.); Siemaszko 90+2'	Report	Hassan 33'; Dal Hende 36'

Stadion GOSiR, Gdynia
Attendance: 14,037
Referee: Enea Jorgji (Albania)
3 August 2017
20:30

Midtjylland (Denmark)	2–1	(Poland) Arka Gdynia
Socha 77' (o.g.); Sørloth 90+3'	Report	Sołdecki 59'

MCH Arena, Herning
Attendance: 8,138
Referee: Eitan Shmuelevitz (Israel)

4–4 on aggregate; Midtjylland won on away goals.

27 July 2017
19:00

Östersunds FK (Sweden)	1–0	(Luxembourg) Fola Esch
Bachirou 50'	Report

Jämtkraft Arena, Östersund
Attendance: 6,061
Referee: Yevhen Aranovsky (Ukraine)
3 August 2017
19:30

Fola Esch (Luxembourg)	1–2	(Sweden) Östersunds FK
Bensi 53'	Report	Somi 59'; Pettersson 66'

Stade Émile Mayrisch, Esch-sur-Alzette
Attendance: 1,590
Referee: Kristo Tohver (Estonia)

Östersunds FK won 3–1 on aggregate.

27 July 2017
20:30

Bordeaux (France)	2–1	(Hungary) Videoton
Sankharé 18', 33'	Report	Šćepović 23'

Nouveau Stade de Bordeaux, Bordeaux
Attendance: 21,337
Referee: Bartosz Frankowski (Poland)
3 August 2017
19:00

Videoton (Hungary)	1–0	(France) Bordeaux
Stopira 45+5'	Report

Pancho Aréna, Felcsút (Note: Videoton played their home matches at Pancho Aréna, Felcsút, instead of their regular stadium Sóstói Stadion, Székesfehérvár, due to reconstruction.)
Attendance: 3,537
Referee: Christian Dingert (Germany)

2–2 on aggregate; Videoton won on away goals.

27 July 2017
18:45

Maccabi Tel Aviv (Israel)	1–0	(Greece) Panionios
Kjartansson 48'	Report

Netanya Stadium, Netanya (Note: Maccabi Tel Aviv played their home matches at Netanya Stadium, Netanya, instead of their regular stadium Bloomfield Stadium, Tel Aviv, due to renovation.)
Attendance: 7,862
Referee: Bart Vertenten (Belgium)
3 August 2017
21:00

Panionios (Greece)	0–1	(Israel) Maccabi Tel Aviv
	Report	Korbos 79' (o.g.)

Nea Smyrni Stadium, Athens
Attendance: 3,167
Referee: Ville Nevalainen (Finland)

Maccabi Tel Aviv won 2–0 on aggregate.

27 July 2017
19:00

Utrecht (Netherlands)	0–0	(Poland) Lech Poznań
	Report

Stadion Galgenwaard, Utrecht
Attendance: 13,817
Referee: Aleksandar Stavrev (Macedonia)
3 August 2017
20:15

Lech Poznań (Poland)	2–2	(Netherlands) Utrecht
Gytkjær 26', 90+4'	Report	Kerk 1'; Dessers 89'

INEA Stadion, Poznań
Attendance: 33,446
Referee: Mads-Kristoffer Kristoffersen (Denmark)

2–2 on aggregate; Utrecht won on away goals.

27 July 2017
20:00

Universitatea Craiova (Romania)	0–1	(Italy) Milan
	Report	Rodríguez 44'

Stadionul Municipal, Drobeta-Turnu Severin (Note: Universitatea Craiova played their home match at Stadionul Municipal, Drobeta-Turnu Severin, instead of their regular stadium Stadionul Ion Oblemenco, Craiova, due to reconstruction.)
Attendance: 14,438
Referee: Halis Özkahya (Turkey)
3 August 2017
20:45

Milan (Italy)	2–0	(Romania) Universitatea Craiova
Bonaventura 9'; Cutrone 52'	Report

San Siro, Milan
Attendance: 65,763
Referee: Nikola Popov (Bulgaria)

Milan won 3–0 on aggregate.

27 July 2017
20:00

Brøndby (Denmark)	0–0	(Croatia) Hajduk Split
	Report

Brøndby Stadium, Brøndbyvester
Attendance: 12,535
Referee: Kevin Clancy (Scotland)
3 August 2017
20:30

Hajduk Split (Croatia)	2–0	(Denmark) Brøndby
Erceg 59', 63'	Report

Stadion Poljud, Split
Attendance: 30,204
Referee: Orel Grinfeeld (Israel)

Hajduk Split won 2–0 on aggregate.

27 July 2017
20:30

Gent (Belgium)	1–1	(Austria) Rheindorf Altach
Coulibaly 76'	Report	Ngwat-Mahop 5'

Ghelamco Arena, Ghent
Attendance: 13,745
Referee: Adrien Jaccottet (Switzerland)
3 August 2017
20:30

Rheindorf Altach (Austria)	3–1	(Belgium) Gent
Ngamaleu 11'; Nutz 76'; Dobras 88'	Report	Milićević 44' (pen.)

Tivoli-Neu, Innsbruck (Note: Rheindorf Altach played their third qualifying and play-off rounds home matches at Tivoli-Neu, Innsbruck, instead of their regular stadium Stadion Schnabelholz, Altach.)
Attendance: 3,852
Referee: Nicolas Rainville (France)

Rheindorf Altach won 4–2 on aggregate.

27 July 2017
19:30

Astra Giurgiu (Romania)	0–0	(Ukraine) Oleksandriya
	Report

Stadionul Marin Anastasovici, Giurgiu
Attendance: 1,482
Referee: Dimitar Mečkarovski (Macedonia)
3 August 2017
19:00

Oleksandriya (Ukraine)	1–0	(Romania) Astra Giurgiu
Zaporozhan 43' (pen.)	Report

CSC Nika Stadium, Oleksandriia
Attendance: 4,820
Referee: Oliver Drachta (Austria)

Oleksandriya won 1–0 on aggregate.

27 July 2017
21:05

Everton (England)	1–0	(Slovakia) Ružomberok
Baines 65'	Report

Goodison Park, Liverpool
Attendance: 32,124
Referee: Georgi Kabakov (Bulgaria)
3 August 2017
20:45

Ružomberok (Slovakia)	0–1	(England) Everton
	Report	Calvert-Lewin 80'

Štadión pod Čebraťom, Ružomberok
Attendance: 4,752
Referee: Michael Tykgaard (Denmark)

Everton won 2–0 on aggregate.

27 July 2017
20:45

Aberdeen (Scotland)	2–1	(Cyprus) Apollon Limassol
Christie 4'; Shinnie 78'	Report	Jander 60'

Pittodrie Stadium, Aberdeen
Attendance: 20,085
Referee: Mattias Gestranius (Finland)
3 August 2017
19:00

Apollon Limassol (Cyprus)	2–0	(Scotland) Aberdeen
Schembri 17'; Zelaya 86'	Report

AEK Arena – Georgios Karapatakis, Larnaca (Note: Apollon Limassol played their home matches at AEK Arena – Georgios Karapatakis, Larnaca, instead of their regular stadium Tsirio Stadium, Limassol.)
Attendance: 6,250
Referee: Stephan Klossner (Switzerland)

Apollon Limassol won 3–2 on aggregate.

27 July 2017
20:30

Red Star Belgrade (Serbia)	2–0	(Czech Republic) Sparta Prague
Boakye 13'; Kanga 65'	Report

Rajko Mitić Stadium, Belgrade
Attendance: 32,816
Referee: Sergey Lapochkin (Russia)
3 August 2017
19:00

Sparta Prague (Czech Republic)	0–1	(Serbia) Red Star Belgrade
	Report	Boakye 19'

Generali Arena, Prague
Attendance: 16,808
Referee: Tony Chapron (France)

Red Star Belgrade won 3–0 on aggregate.

27 July 2017
19:30

Botev Plovdiv (Bulgaria)	0–0	(Portugal) Marítimo
	Report

Lazur Stadium, Burgas (Note: Botev Plovdiv played their home matches at Lazur Stadium, Burgas, instead of their temporary stadium Botev 1912 Football Complex, Plovdiv.)
Attendance: 10,843
Referee: Bojan Pandžić (Sweden)
3 August 2017
20:00

Marítimo (Portugal)	2–0	(Bulgaria) Botev Plovdiv
Pinho 34' (pen.); Valente 49'	Report

Estádio do Marítimo, Funchal
Attendance: 6,143
Referee: Srđan Jovanović (Serbia)

Marítimo won 2–0 on aggregate.

27 July 2017
19:30

Bnei Yehuda (Israel)	0–2	(Russia) Zenit Saint Petersburg
	Report	Criscito 59'; Kokorin 90'

HaMoshava Stadium, Petah Tikva (Note: Bnei Yehuda played their home matches at HaMoshava Stadium, Petah Tikva, instead of their regular stadium Bloomfield Stadium, Tel Aviv, due to renovation.)
Attendance: 3,200
Referee: Nikola Dabanović (Montenegro)
3 August 2017
19:00

Zenit Saint Petersburg (Russia)	0–1	(Israel) Bnei Yehuda
	Report	Buzaglo 67'

Krestovsky Stadium, Saint Petersburg
Attendance: 45,670
Referee: Ali Palabıyık (Turkey)

Zenit Saint Petersburg won 2–1 on aggregate.

27 July 2017
20:45

Marseille (France)	4–2	(Belgium) Oostende
Germain 2', 57', 82'; Sanson 32'	Report	Siani 26' (pen.); Musona 69'

Stade Vélodrome, Marseille
Attendance: 46,519
Referee: Mete Kalkavan (Turkey)
3 August 2017
20:45

Oostende (Belgium)	0–0	(France) Marseille
	Report

Versluys Arena, Ostend
Attendance: 7,900
Referee: Marco Guida (Italy)

Marseille won 4–2 on aggregate.

27 July 2017
21:05

SC Freiburg (Germany)	1–0	(Slovenia) Domžale
Petersen 20'	Report

Schwarzwald-Stadion, Freiburg im Breisgau
Attendance: 14,000
Referee: Anatoliy Zhabchenko (Ukraine)
3 August 2017
21:05

Domžale (Slovenia)	2–0	(Germany) SC Freiburg
Ibričić 50' (pen.); Bizjak 59'	Report

Stožice Stadium, Ljubljana (Note: Domžale played their first qualifying round home match at Arena Petrol, Celje, and third qualifying and play-off rounds home matches at Stožice Stadium, Ljubljana, instead of their regular stadium Sports Park, Domžale.)
Attendance: 5,136
Referee: Alexandre Boucaut (Belgium)

Domžale won 2–1 on aggregate.

27 July 2017
19:00

AEK Larnaca (Cyprus)	2–0	(Belarus) Dinamo Minsk
Tete 42'; Hevel 70'	Report

AEK Arena – Georgios Karapatakis, Larnaca
Attendance: 4,050
Referee: Petr Ardeleánu (Czech Republic)
3 August 2017
17:00

Dinamo Minsk (Belarus)	1–1	(Cyprus) AEK Larnaca
Saroka 47' (pen.)	Report	Acorán 90+3'

Traktor Stadium, Minsk
Attendance: 3,670
Referee: Simon Lee Evans (Wales)

AEK Larnaca won 3–1 on aggregate.

27 July 2017
19:00

AIK (Sweden)	1–1	(Portugal) Braga
Sundgren 18' (pen.)	Report	Raul Silva 10'

Friends Arena, Solna
Attendance: 12,456
Referee: Marius Avram (Romania)
3 August 2017
22:00

Braga (Portugal)	2–1 (a.e.t.)	(Sweden) AIK
Fonte 74'; Raul Silva 120+1'	Report	Obasi 13'

Estádio Municipal de Braga, Braga
Attendance: 13,851
Referee: Frank Schneider (France)

Braga won 3–2 on aggregate.

27 July 2017
19:00

Sūduva (Lithuania)	3–0	(Switzerland) Sion
Ricardo 3' (o.g.); Janušauskas 9'; Laukžemis 90+1'	Report

Sūduva Stadium, Marijampolė
Attendance: 3,167
Referee: Alexander Harkam (Austria)
2 August 2017
18:00

Sion (Switzerland)	1–1	(Lithuania) Sūduva
Konaté 55'	Report	Vėževičius 80'

Stade de Genève, Geneva (Note: Sion played their home match at Stade de Genève, Geneva, instead of their regular stadium Stade de Tourbillon, Sion, due to renovation.)
Attendance: 410
Referee: Antony Gautier (France)

Sūduva won 4–1 on aggregate.

== Play-off round ==
=== Summary ===
The first legs were played on 16 and 17 August, and the second legs were played on 24 August 2017.

Team 1	Agg.	Team 2	1st leg	2nd leg
Milan (Italy)	7–0 (Note: Order of legs reversed after original draw.)	(North Macedonia) Shkëndija	6–0	1–0
Osijek (Croatia)	2–2 (a)	Austria Wien	1–2	1–0
Krasnodar (Russia)	4–4 (a)	(Serbia) Red Star Belgrade	3–2	1–2
Club Brugge (Belgium)	0–3	(Greece) AEK Athens	0–0	0–3
Marítimo (Portugal)	1–3	(Ukraine) Dynamo Kyiv	0–0	1–3
Panathinaikos (Greece)	2–4	(Spain) Athletic Bilbao	2–3	0–1
Apollon Limassol (Cyprus)	4–3	(Denmark) Midtjylland	3–2	1–1
FH (Iceland)	3–5	(Portugal) Braga	1–2	2–3
Everton (England)	3–1	(Croatia) Hajduk Split	2–0	1–1
Viitorul Constanța (Romania)	1–7	(Austria) Red Bull Salzburg	1–3	0–4
Vardar (North Macedonia)	4–1	(Turkey) Fenerbahçe	2–0	2–1
Ajax (Netherlands)	2–4	(Norway) Rosenborg	0–1	2–3
Rheindorf Altach (Austria)	2–3	(Israel) Maccabi Tel Aviv	0–1	2–2
BATE Borisov (Belarus)	3–2	(Ukraine) Oleksandriya	1–1	2–1
Dinamo Zagreb (Croatia)	1–1 (a)	(Albania) Skënderbeu	1–1	0–0
Ludogorets Razgrad (Bulgaria)	2–0	(Lithuania) Sūduva	2–0	0–0
Domžale (Slovenia)	1–4	(France) Marseille	1–1	0–3
Partizan (Serbia)	4–0	(Hungary) Videoton	0–0	4–0
Utrecht (Netherlands)	1–2	(Russia) Zenit Saint Petersburg	1–0	0–2 (a.e.t.)
Legia Warsaw (Poland)	1–1 (a)	(Moldova) Sheriff Tiraspol	1–1	0–0
Viktoria Plzeň (Czech Republic)	3–1	(Cyprus) AEK Larnaca	3–1	0–0
PAOK (Greece)	3–3 (a)	(Sweden) Östersunds FK	3–1	0–2

=== Matches ===
17 August 2017
20:45

Milan (Italy)	6–0	(North Macedonia) Shkëndija
Silva 13', 28'; Montolivo 25', 85'; Borini 67'; Antonelli 69'	Report

San Siro, Milan
Attendance: 40,613
Referee: Harald Lechner (Austria)
24 August 2017
20:45

Shkëndija (North Macedonia)	0–1	(Italy) Milan
	Report	Cutrone 13'

Philip II Arena, Skopje
Attendance: 25,600
Referee: István Kovács (Romania)

Milan won 7–0 on aggregate.

17 August 2017
20:45

Osijek (Croatia)	1–2	Austria Wien
Ejupi 15'	Report	Monschein 26'; Holzhauser 60'

Stadion Gradski vrt, Osijek
Attendance: 15,000
Referee: Deniz Aytekin (Germany)
24 August 2017
21:05

Austria Wien	0–1	(Croatia) Osijek
	Report	Boban 62'

NV Arena, Sankt Pölten
Attendance: 7,400
Referee: Vladislav Bezborodov (Russia)

2–2 on aggregate; Austria Wien won on away goals.

17 August 2017
19:00

Krasnodar (Russia)	3–2	(Serbia) Red Star Belgrade
Ignatyev 20'; Claesson 46'; Petrov 66'	Report	Srnić 57'; Pešić 71'

Krasnodar Stadium, Krasnodar
Attendance: 24,587
Referee: Gediminas Mažeika (Lithuania)
24 August 2017
21:00

Red Star Belgrade (Serbia)	2–1	(Russia) Krasnodar
Radonjić 7'; Kanga 46'	Report	Granqvist 82' (pen.)

Rajko Mitić Stadium, Belgrade
Attendance: 50,720
Referee: Tobias Stieler (Germany)

4–4 on aggregate; Red Star Belgrade won on away goals.

17 August 2017
20:45

Club Brugge (Belgium)	0–0	(Greece) AEK Athens
	Report

Jan Breydel Stadium, Bruges
Attendance: 27,115
Referee: Viktor Kassai (Hungary)
24 August 2017
20:00

AEK Athens (Greece)	3–0	(Belgium) Club Brugge
Christodoulopoulos 27' (pen.); Simões 39', 90+1'	Report

Olympic Stadium, Athens
Attendance: 14,275
Referee: Jesús Gil Manzano (Spain)

AEK Athens won 3–0 on aggregate.

17 August 2017
21:30

Marítimo (Portugal)	0–0	(Ukraine) Dynamo Kyiv
	Report

Estádio do Marítimo, Funchal
Attendance: 8,764
Referee: Jakob Kehlet (Denmark)
24 August 2017
18:45

Dynamo Kyiv (Ukraine)	3–1	(Portugal) Marítimo
Harmash 33'; Morozyuk 35'; González 61'	Report	Şen 68'

Olimpiyskiy National Sports Complex, Kyiv
Attendance: 23,194
Referee: Liran Liany (Israel)

Dynamo Kyiv won 3–1 on aggregate.

17 August 2017
20:30

Panathinaikos (Greece)	2–3	(Spain) Athletic Bilbao
Lod 29'; Cabezas 55'	Report	Aduriz 68', 74' (pen.); De Marcos 71'

Leoforos Alexandras Stadium, Athens
Attendance: 15,000
Referee: Jorge Sousa (Portugal)
24 August 2017
20:45

Athletic Bilbao (Spain)	1–0	(Greece) Panathinaikos
Muniain 22'	Report

San Mamés, Bilbao
Attendance: 42,747
Referee: Benoît Bastien (France)

Athletic Bilbao won 4–2 on aggregate.

17 August 2017
19:00

Apollon Limassol (Cyprus)	3–2	(Denmark) Midtjylland
Kyriakou 15'; Jander 70'; Pittas 90+1'	Report	Sørloth 38', 74'

AEK Arena – Georgios Karapatakis, Larnaca
Attendance: 5,250
Referee: Michael Oliver (England)
24 August 2017
20:00

Midtjylland (Denmark)	1–1	(Cyprus) Apollon Limassol
Hassan 10'	Report	Schembri 50'

MCH Arena, Herning
Attendance: 9,022
Referee: Robert Schörgenhofer (Austria)

Apollon Limassol won 4–3 on aggregate.

17 August 2017
19:45

FH (Iceland)	1–2	(Portugal) Braga
H. Björnsson 40'	Report	Paulinho 62'; Stojiljković 79'

Kaplakriki, Hafnarfjörður
Attendance: 1,432
Referee: Kevin Blom (Netherlands)
24 August 2017
20:45

Braga (Portugal)	3–2	(Iceland) FH
Paulinho 39', 80'; Dyego Sousa 90+3'	Report	Böðvarsson 16', 51'

Estádio Municipal de Braga, Braga
Attendance: 10,937
Referee: Paweł Gil (Poland)

Braga won 5–3 on aggregate.

17 August 2017
21:05

Everton (England)	2–0	(Croatia) Hajduk Split
Keane 30'; Gueye 44'	Report

Goodison Park, Liverpool
Attendance: 34,977
Referee: Ivan Kružliak (Slovakia)
24 August 2017
21:00

Hajduk Split (Croatia)	1–1	(England) Everton
Radošević 43'	Report	Sigurðsson 46'

Stadion Poljud, Split
Attendance: 31,645
Referee: Sergei Karasev (Russia)

Everton won 3–1 on aggregate.

17 August 2017
20:45

Viitorul Constanța (Romania)	1–3	(Austria) Red Bull Salzburg
Țucudean 7'	Report	Hwang Hee-chan 2'; Wolf 29'; Dabour 31'

Stadionul Viitorul, Ovidiu
Attendance: 3,338
Referee: Anthony Taylor (England)
24 August 2017
19:00

Red Bull Salzburg (Austria)	4–0	(Romania) Viitorul Constanța
Dabour 7'; Gulbrandsen 38'; Berisha 52' (pen.); Haidara 88'	Report

Red Bull Arena, Wals-Siezenheim
Attendance: 6,606
Referee: Stefan Johannesson (Sweden)

Red Bull Salzburg won 7–1 on aggregate.

17 August 2017
20:00

Vardar (North Macedonia)	2–0	(Turkey) Fenerbahçe
Barseghyan 20'; Topal 90+2' (o.g.)	Report

Philip II Arena, Skopje
Attendance: 20,863
Referee: Luca Banti (Italy)
24 August 2017
19:30

Fenerbahçe (Turkey)	1–2	(North Macedonia) Vardar
Neustädter 61'	Report	Jighauri 68'; Gligorov 90+1'

Şükrü Saracoğlu Stadium, Istanbul
Attendance: 32,480
Referee: Daniel Stefanski (Poland)

Vardar won 4–1 on aggregate.

17 August 2017
20:45

Ajax (Netherlands)	0–1	(Norway) Rosenborg
	Report	Adegbenro 77'

Amsterdam Arena, Amsterdam
Attendance: 50,717
Referee: Craig Thomson (Scotland)
24 August 2017
20:45

Rosenborg (Norway)	3–2	(Netherlands) Ajax
Bendtner 26'; Adegbenro 80', 89'	Report	Younes 60'; Schöne 61'

Lerkendal Stadion, Trondheim
Attendance: 21,211
Referee: Ruddy Buquet (France)

Rosenborg won 4–2 on aggregate.

17 August 2017
20:30

Rheindorf Altach (Austria)	0–1	(Israel) Maccabi Tel Aviv
	Report	Kjartansson 68'

Tivoli-Neu, Innsbruck
Attendance: 5,269
Referee: Aleksei Kulbakov (Belarus)
24 August 2017
19:00

Maccabi Tel Aviv (Israel)	2–2	(Austria) Rheindorf Altach
Kjartansson 41'; Yeini 73'	Report	Aigner 20'; Netzer 59'

Netanya Stadium, Netanya
Attendance: 10,637
Referee: Aleksei Eskov (Russia)

Maccabi Tel Aviv won 3–2 on aggregate.

17 August 2017
19:00

BATE Borisov (Belarus)	1–1	(Ukraine) Oleksandriya
Ivanić 8'	Report	Banada 19'

Borisov Arena, Barysaw
Attendance: 11,467
Referee: Tamás Bognár (Hungary)
24 August 2017
19:00

Oleksandriya (Ukraine)	1–2	(Belarus) BATE Borisov
Hrytsuk 34' (pen.)	Report	Ivanić 70', 73'

CSC Nika Stadium, Oleksandriia
Attendance: 6,900
Referee: Miroslav Zelinka (Czech Republic)

BATE Borisov won 3–2 on aggregate.

17 August 2017
19:00

Dinamo Zagreb (Croatia)	1–1	(Albania) Skënderbeu
Henríquez 90+5'	Report	Latifi 37'

Stadion Maksimir, Zagreb
Attendance: 9,369
Referee: Andris Treimanis (Latvia)
24 August 2017
20:00

Skënderbeu (Albania)	0–0	(Croatia) Dinamo Zagreb
	Report

Elbasan Arena, Elbasan
Attendance: 11,230
Referee: István Vad (Hungary)

1–1 on aggregate; Skënderbeu won on away goals.

17 August 2017
20:30

Ludogorets Razgrad (Bulgaria)	2–0	(Lithuania) Sūduva
Moți 61'; Misidjan 76'	Report

Ludogorets Arena, Razgrad
Attendance: 5,428
Referee: Sébastien Delferière (Belgium)
24 August 2017
19:30

Sūduva (Lithuania)	0–0	(Bulgaria) Ludogorets Razgrad
	Report

Sūduva Stadium, Marijampolė
Attendance: 4,312
Referee: Halis Özkahya (Turkey)

Ludogorets Razgrad won 2–0 on aggregate.

17 August 2017
20:45

Domžale (Slovenia)	1–1	(France) Marseille
Vetrih 12'	Report	Sanson 63'

Stožice Stadium, Ljubljana
Attendance: 10,543
Referee: Bobby Madden (Scotland)
24 August 2017
20:45

Marseille (France)	3–0	(Slovenia) Domžale
Germain 28', 56'; Thauvin 85'	Report

Stade Vélodrome, Marseille
Attendance: 47,352
Referee: Orel Grinfeeld (Israel)

Marseille won 4–1 on aggregate.

17 August 2017
21:00

Partizan (Serbia)	0–0	(Hungary) Videoton
	Report

Partizan Stadium, Belgrade
Attendance: 0 (Note: The Partizan v Videoton match was played behind closed doors due to punishment by UEFA.)
Referee: John Beaton (Scotland)
24 August 2017
20:00

Videoton (Hungary)	0–4	(Serbia) Partizan
	Report	Tawamba 6'; Soumah 24'; Đurđević 35', 87'

Pancho Aréna, Felcsút
Attendance: 3,485
Referee: Andre Marriner (England)

Partizan won 4–0 on aggregate.

16 August 2017
18:00

Utrecht (Netherlands)	1–0	(Russia) Zenit Saint Petersburg
Labyad 77'	Report

Stadion Galgenwaard, Utrecht
Attendance: 19,370
Referee: Slavko Vinčić (Slovenia)
24 August 2017
19:00

Zenit Saint Petersburg (Russia)	2–0 (a.e.t.)	(Netherlands) Utrecht
Kokorin 9', 105'	Report

Krestovsky Stadium, Saint Petersburg
Attendance: 49,237
Referee: Carlos del Cerro Grande (Spain)

Zenit Saint Petersburg won 2–1 on aggregate.

17 August 2017
20:45

Legia Warsaw (Poland)	1–1	(Moldova) Sheriff Tiraspol
Hämäläinen 76'	Report	Bayala 87'

Polish Army Stadium, Warsaw
Attendance: 17,732
Referee: Aleksandar Stavrev (Macedonia)
24 August 2017
19:00

Sheriff Tiraspol (Moldova)	0–0	(Poland) Legia Warsaw
	Report

Sheriff Stadium, Tiraspol
Attendance: 6,237
Referee: Ivan Bebek (Croatia)

1–1 on aggregate; Sheriff Tiraspol won on away goals.

17 August 2017
20:15

Viktoria Plzeň (Czech Republic)	3–1	(Cyprus) AEK Larnaca
Bakoš 29', 74' (pen.); Kolář 36'	Report	Acorán 8'

Doosan Arena, Plzeň
Attendance: 10,031
Referee: Matej Jug (Slovenia)
24 August 2017
18:00

AEK Larnaca (Cyprus)	0–0	(Czech Republic) Viktoria Plzeň
	Report

AEK Arena – Georgios Karapatakis, Larnaca
Attendance: 5,300
Referee: Artur Soares Dias (Portugal)

Viktoria Plzeň won 3–1 on aggregate.

17 August 2017
20:00

PAOK (Greece)	3–1	(Sweden) Östersunds FK
Léo Matos 38'; Prijović 77', 88' (pen.)	Report	Nouri 21' (pen.)

Toumba Stadium, Thessaloniki
Attendance: 16,743
Referee: Bas Nijhuis (Netherlands)
24 August 2017
19:00

Östersunds FK (Sweden)	2–0	(Greece) PAOK
Ghoddos 71', 77'	Report

Jämtkraft Arena, Östersund
Attendance: 5,697
Referee: Paweł Raczkowski (Poland)

3–3 on aggregate; Östersunds FK won on away goals.
