= Vladislav Zhikov =

Bulgarian footballer

Personal information
- Full name: Vladislav Valeriev Zhikov
- Date of birth: 19 January 1999 (age 27)
- Place of birth: Vidin, Bulgaria
- Height: 1.93 m (6 ft 4 in)
- Position: Midfielder

Team information
- Current team: ASD Capanne
- Number: 8

Youth career
- –2013: Club Napoli
- 2013–2017: Milan
- 2017–2018: Livorno

Senior career*
Years	Team	Apps	(Gls)
2017–2018	Livorno	1	(0)
2019	Olhanense	0	(0)
2019–2020	Atletico Cenaia		
2020–2022	Volterrana 2016		
2022–2024	ASD Peccioli		
2024–	ASD Capanne	28	(4)

International career
2015–2016	Bulgaria U17	6	(0)
2016–2017	Bulgaria U18	2	(0)
2017	Bulgaria U19	1	(0)
- * Club domestic league appearances and goals as of 13:30, 30 April 2025 (UTC)

Vladislav Zhikov (Bulgarian: Владислав Жиков; born 19 January 1999) is a Bulgarian professional footballer who plays as a midfielder for Italian lower-league side ASD Capanne.

== Career ==
=== Youth career ===
Zhikov was born in Vidin, but at age of 5 he moved with his family in Castellammare di Stabia, Italy. He started his career in Club Napoli together with Gianluigi Donnarumma. In 2013 he and Dunnarumma were spotted by Milan scouts and were both transferred in the Rossoneri's academy. In 2016 he was listed by The Guardian in the Next Generation 2016 of the best young talents in world football. Same year Vincenzo Montella took him to train with the first team of Milan. In October he was watched by Chelsea.

=== Livorno ===
On 10 August 2017, Livorno announced that Zhikov is now player of Labronici. Zhikov himself said that he preferred to move to Livorno in order to get more first team chances over playing for Primavera teams. He completed his professional debut for the team in the last league match for the season on 8 May 2018 against Piacenza.

=== Olhanense ===
On 16 January 2019, Portuguese club Olhanense announced the signing of Zhikov.

=== Volterrana ===
Zhikov joined Italian lower-league side ASD Volterrana 2016 in August 2020.

== Career statistics ==
=== Club ===
As of 8 May 2018

Appearances and goals by club, season and competition
Club	Season	League			Cup		Continental		Other		Total	
Club	Season	Division	Apps	Goals	Apps	Goals	Apps	Goals	Apps	Goals	Apps	Goals
Livorno	Serie C	2017–18	1	0	0	0	–		–		1	0
Career total			1	0	0	0	0	0	0	0	1	0

== Honours ==
Individual

- The Guardian Top 60 Next Generation: 2016
