= Mihael Modić =

Bosnian footballer (born 1998)

Personal information
- Date of birth: 14 January 1998 (age 28)
- Place of birth: Banja Luka, Bosnia and Herzegovina
- Height: 1.79 m (5 ft 10 1/2 in)
- Position: Forward

Team information
- Current team: Pro Sesto
- Number: 10

Youth career
- 2011–2018: Milan

Senior career*
| Years | Team | Apps | (Gls) |
| 2017 | → Rende (loan) | 6 | (0) |
| 2018–2021 | Krupa | 32 | (2) |
| 2021–2023 | Pianese | 47 | (2) |
| 2023–2024 | Follonica Gavorrano | 25 | (1) |
| 2024– | Pro Sesto | 6 | (0) |
- * Club domestic league appearances and goals as of 17 November 2024

Mihael Modić (born 14 January 1998) is a Bosnian professional footballer who plays as a forward for Italian Serie D club Pro Sesto.

== Career ==
In 2011, Modić and his brother Andrej, joined the youth academy of Milan, one of Italy's most successful clubs. In 2017, he was sent on loan to Rende in the Italian Serie C.

In 2018, Modić signed with Bosnian Premier League club Krupa.
