= Raul Zucchetti =

Italian footballer

Personal information
- Date of birth: 28 January 1998 (age 28)
- Place of birth: Rho, Italy
- Height: 1.85 m (6 ft 1 in)
- Position: Left-back

Team information
- Current team: Ardor Lazzate

Youth career
- –2017: Milan

Senior career*
Years	Team	Apps	(Gls)
2017	Milan	0	(0)
2017–2021	Virtus Entella	0	(0)
2017	→ AlbinoLeffe (loan)	8	(0)
2018	→ Prato (loan)	10	(1)
2018–2019	→ Imolese (loan)	4	(0)
2019–2020	→ Gozzano (loan)	10	(0)
2021–2022	Arconatese	23	(2)
2022–	Ardor Lazzate		
- * Club domestic league appearances and goals as of 11:44, 7 April 2023 (UTC)

Raul Zucchetti (born 28 January 1998) is an Italian footballer who plays for Eccellenza club Arconatese.

== Club career ==
He made his Serie C debut for AlbinoLeffe on 17 September 2017 in a game against Santarcangelo.

On 22 August 2018, he was signed by Imolese on a temporary deal.

On 30 August 2019, he joined Gozzano.
