= 2017–18 UEFA Europa League =

47th season of Europe's secondary club football tournament organised by UEFA

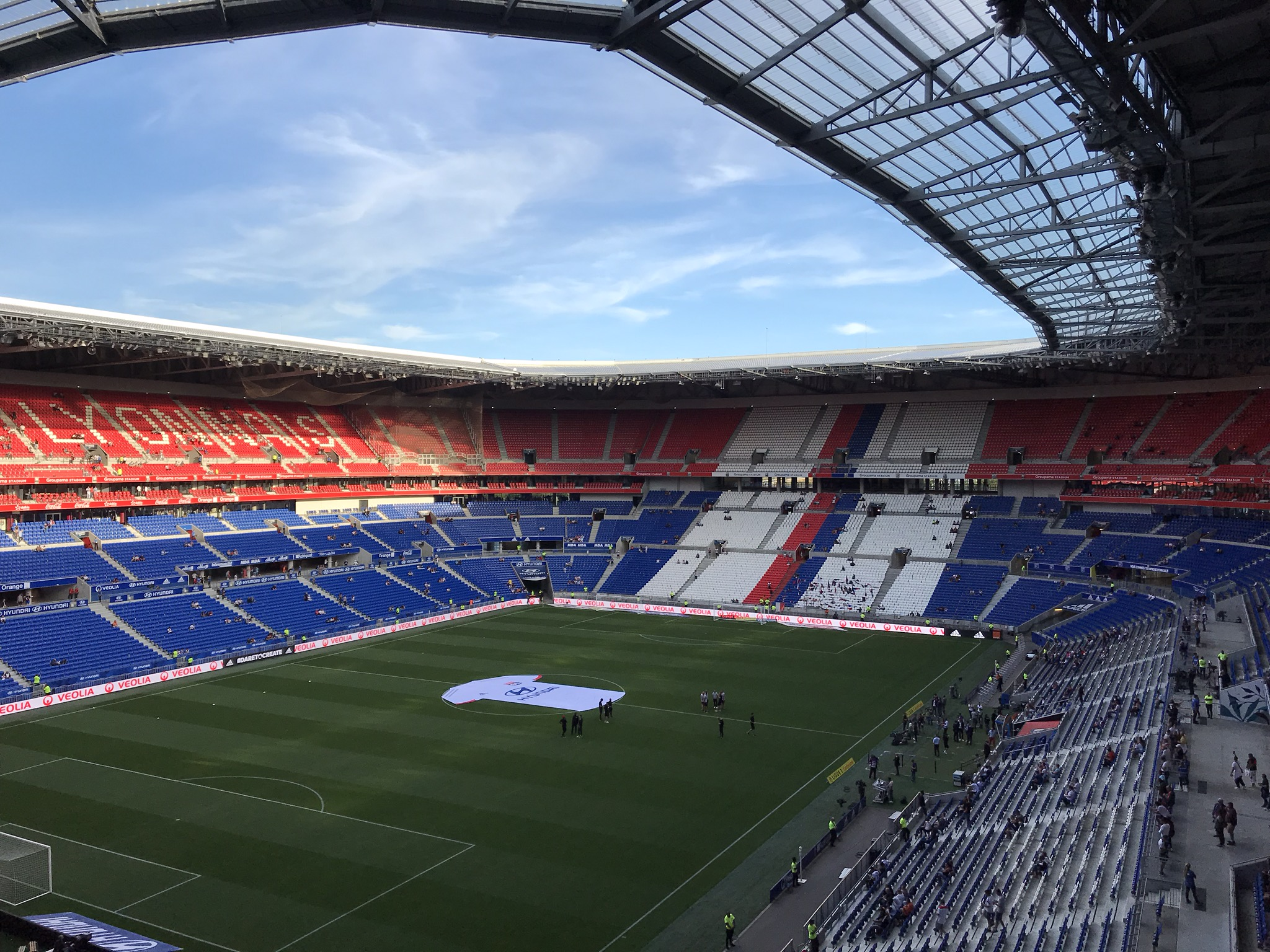
- The Parc Olympique Lyonnais in Décines-Charpieu hosted the final

Tournament details
- Dates: Qualifying: 29 June – 24 August 2017; Competition proper: 14 September 2017 – 16 May 2018
- Teams: Competition proper: 48+8; Total: 157+33 (from 55 associations)

Final positions
- Champions: (Spain) Atlético Madrid (3rd title)
- Runners-up: (France) Marseille

Tournament statistics
- Matches played: 205
- Goals scored: 556 (2.71 per match)
- Attendance: 4,545,716 (22,174 per match)
- Top scorer(s): Aritz Aduriz (Athletic Bilbao); Ciro Immobile (Lazio); 8 goals each
- Best player: Antoine Griezmann (Atlético Madrid)

The 2017–18 UEFA Europa League was the 47th season of Europe's secondary club football tournament organised by UEFA, and the 9th season since it was renamed from the UEFA Cup to the UEFA Europa League.

The final was played at the Parc Olympique Lyonnais in Décines-Charpieu, France. Atlético Madrid defeated Marseille to win their third Europa League title.

As winners, Atlético Madrid earned the right to play against the winners of the 2017–18 UEFA Champions League, Real Madrid, in the 2018 UEFA Super Cup. Moreover, they would also have been automatically qualified for the 2018–19 UEFA Champions League group stage, but since they had already qualified through their league performance, the berth reserved was given to the third-placed team of the 2017–18 Ligue 1, the fifth-ranked association according to next season's access list.

Manchester United qualified for the 2017–18 UEFA Champions League as the title holders of Europa League. They were unable to defend their title as they qualified for the Champions League knockout phase, and were eliminated by Sevilla in the round of 16.

== Association team allocation ==
A total of 190 teams from all 55 UEFA member associations participated in the 2017–18 UEFA Europa League. The association ranking based on the UEFA country coefficients was used to determine the number of participating teams for each association:

- Associations 1–51 (except Liechtenstein) each had three teams qualify.
  - As the winners of the 2016–17 UEFA Europa League, Manchester United qualified for the 2017–18 UEFA Champions League; the 2017–18 UEFA Europa League berth they would otherwise have earned for finishing 6th in the 2016–17 Premier League was vacated and not passed to another English team.
- Associations 52–54 each had two teams qualify.
- Liechtenstein and Kosovo (association 55) each had one team qualify (Liechtenstein organised only a domestic cup and no domestic league; Kosovo as per decision by the UEFA Executive Committee).
- Moreover, 33 teams eliminated from the 2017–18 UEFA Champions League were transferred to the Europa League.

Starting from this season, Gibraltar were granted two spots instead of one in the Europa League. Kosovo, who became a UEFA member on 3 May 2016, made their debut in the UEFA Europa League.

=== Association ranking ===
For the 2017–18 UEFA Europa League, the associations were allocated places according to their 2016 UEFA country coefficients, which took into account their performance in European competitions from 2011–12 to 2015–16.

Apart from the allocation based on the country coefficients, associations could have additional teams participating in the Europa League, as noted below:

- (UCL) – Additional teams transferred from the UEFA Champions League
- (UEL) – Vacated berth due to UEFA Europa League title holders playing in UEFA Champions League

Rank	Association	Coeff.	Teams	Notes
1	Spain	105.713	3	+1 (UCL)
2	Germany	80.177	3	+3 (UCL)
3	England	76.284	3	−1 (UEL)
4	Italy	70.439	3	+1 (UCL)
5	Portugal	53.082	3	+1 (UCL)
6	France	52.749	3	+1 (UCL)
7	Russia	51.082	3	+2 (UCL)
8	Ukraine	44.883	3	+1 (UCL)
9	Belgium	40.000	3	+1 (UCL)
10	Netherlands	35.563	3	+1 (UCL)
11	Turkey	34.600	3	+1 (UCL)
12	Switzerland	33.775	3	+1 (UCL)
13	Czech Republic	32.925	3	+2 (UCL)
14	Greece	29.700	3	+1 (UCL)
15	Romania	25.383	3	+2 (UCL)
16	Austria	25.100	3	+1 (UCL)
17	Croatia	23.875	3	+1 (UCL)
18	Poland	22.500	3	+1 (UCL)
19	Cyprus	22.175	3	

Rank	Association	Coeff.	Teams	Notes
20	Belarus	20.000	3	+1 (UCL)
21	Sweden	19.875	3	
22	Norway	19.250	3	+1 (UCL)
23	Israel	18.625	3	+1 (UCL)
24	Denmark	18.600	3	+1 (UCL)
25	Scotland	17.300	3	+1 (UCL)
26	Azerbaijan	14.875	3	
27	Serbia	14.625	3	+1 (UCL)
28	Kazakhstan	14.125	3	+1 (UCL)
29	Bulgaria	13.125	3	+1 (UCL)
30	Slovenia	13.125	3	
31	Slovakia	12.000	3	
32	Liechtenstein	10.500	1	
33	Hungary	9.875	3	
34	Moldova	9.125	3	+1 (UCL)
35	Iceland	8.750	3	+1 (UCL)
36	Georgia	8.125	3	
37	Finland	7.400	3	

Rank	Association	Coeff.	Teams	Notes
38	Bosnia and Herzegovina	7.125	3	
39	Albania	6.625	3	
40	Macedonia	6.000	3	+1 (UCL)
41	Republic of Ireland	5.450	3	
42	Latvia	5.375	3	
43	Luxembourg	5.250	3	
44	Montenegro	4.875	3	
45	Lithuania	4.625	3	
46	Northern Ireland	4.500	3	
47	Estonia	4.250	3	
48	Armenia	4.125	3	
49	Faroe Islands	3.625	3	
50	Malta	3.583	3	
51	Wales	3.500	3	
52	Gibraltar	1.000	2	
53	Andorra	0.999	2	
54	San Marino	0.333	2	
55	Kosovo	0.000	1	

=== Distribution ===
In the default access list, Manchester United entered the group stage (as the sixth-placed team of the 2016–17 Premier League). However, since they qualified for the Champions League as the Europa League title holders, the spot which they qualified for in the Europa League group stage was vacated, and the following changes to the default allocation system were made:

- The domestic cup winners of association 13 (Czech Republic) are promoted from the third qualifying round to the group stage.
- The domestic cup winners of association 18 (Poland) are promoted from the second qualifying round to the third qualifying round.
- The domestic cup winners of associations 25 (Scotland) and 26 (Azerbaijan) are promoted from the first qualifying round to the second qualifying round.

	Teams entering in this round	Teams advancing from previous round	Teams transferred from Champions League
First qualifying round (100 teams)	29 domestic cup winners from associations 27–55; 36 domestic league runners-up from associations 18–54 (except Liechtenstein); 35 domestic league third-placed teams from associations 16–51 (except Liechtenstein)		
Second qualifying round (66 teams)	8 domestic cup winners from associations 19–26; 2 domestic league runners-up from associations 16–17; 6 domestic league fourth-placed teams from associations 10–15	50 winners from first qualifying round	
Third qualifying round (58 teams)	5 domestic cup winners from associations 14–18; 9 domestic league third-placed teams from associations 7–15; 5 domestic league fourth-placed teams from associations 5–9; 3 domestic league fifth-placed teams from associations 4–6 (League Cup winners for France); 3 domestic league sixth-placed teams from associations 1–3 (League Cup winners for England)	33 winners from second qualifying round	
Play-off round (44 teams)		29 winners from third qualifying round	15 losers from Champions League third qualifying round
Group stage (48 teams)	13 domestic cup winners from associations 1–13; 1 domestic league fourth-placed team from association 4; 2 domestic league fifth-placed teams from associations 1–3 (except Europa League title holders)	22 winners from play-off round	10 losers from Champions League play-off round
Knockout phase (32 teams)		12 group winners from group stage; 12 group runners-up from group stage	8 third-placed teams from Champions League group stage

==== Redistribution rules ====
A Europa League place was vacated when a team qualified for both the Champions League and the Europa League, or qualified for the Europa League by more than one method. When a place was vacated, it was redistributed within the national association by the following rules (regulations Articles 3.03 and 3.04):

- When the domestic cup winners (considered as the "highest-placed" qualifier within the national association with the latest starting round) also qualified for the Champions League, their Europa League place was vacated. As a result, the highest-placed team in the league which had not yet qualified for European competitions qualified for the Europa League, with the Europa League qualifiers which finished above them in the league moving up one "place".
- When the domestic cup winners also qualified for the Europa League through league position, their place through the league position was vacated. As a result, the highest-placed team in the league which had not yet qualified for European competitions qualified for the Europa League, with the Europa League qualifiers which finished above them in the league moving up one "place" if possible.
- For associations where a Europa League place was reserved for either the League Cup or end-of-season European competition play-offs winners, they always qualified for the Europa League as the "lowest-placed" qualifier. If the League Cup winners had already qualified for European competitions through other methods, this reserved Europa League place was taken by the highest-placed team in the league which had not yet qualified for European competitions.

=== Teams ===
The labels in the parentheses show how each team qualified for the place of its starting round:

- CW: Cup winners
- 2nd, 3rd, 4th, 5th, 6th, etc.: League position
- LC: League Cup winners
- RW: Regular season winners
- PW: End-of-season European competition play-offs winners
- UCL: Transferred from the Champions League
  - GS: Third-placed teams from the group stage
  - PO: Losers from the play-off round
  - Q3: Losers from the third qualifying round

Round of 32
(Russia) CSKA Moscow (UCL GS)	(Spain) Atlético Madrid (UCL GS)	(Russia) Spartak Moscow (UCL GS)	(Germany) RB Leipzig (UCL GS)
(Scotland) Celtic (UCL GS)	(Portugal) Sporting CP (UCL GS)	(Italy) Napoli (UCL GS)	(Germany) Borussia Dortmund (UCL GS)
Group stage
(Spain) Villarreal (5th)	(Portugal) Vitória de Guimarães (4th)	(Switzerland) Lugano (3rd)	(Turkey) İstanbul Başakşehir (UCL PO)
(Spain) Real Sociedad (6th)	(France) Lyon (4th)	(Czech Republic) Fastav Zlín (CW)	(Switzerland) Young Boys (UCL PO)
(Germany) 1. FC Köln (5th)	(Russia) Lokomotiv Moscow (CW)	(Denmark) Copenhagen (UCL PO)	(France) Nice (UCL PO)
(Germany) Hertha BSC (6th)	(Ukraine) Zorya Luhansk (3rd)	(Czech Republic) Slavia Prague (UCL PO)	(Germany) TSG Hoffenheim (UCL PO)
(England) Arsenal (CW)	(Belgium) Zulte Waregem (CW)	(Croatia) Rijeka (UCL PO)	(Romania) FCSB (UCL PO)
(Italy) Atalanta (4th)	(Netherlands) Vitesse (CW)	(Kazakhstan) Astana (UCL PO)	
(Italy) Lazio (5th)	(Turkey) Konyaspor (CW)	(Israel) Hapoel Be'er Sheva (UCL PO)	
Play-off round
(Belarus) BATE Borisov (UCL Q3)	(Norway) Rosenborg (UCL Q3)	(Moldova) Sheriff Tiraspol (UCL Q3)	(Ukraine) Dynamo Kyiv (UCL Q3)
(Poland) Legia Warsaw (UCL Q3)	(Bulgaria) Ludogorets Razgrad (UCL Q3)	(Serbia) Partizan (UCL Q3)	(Greece) AEK Athens (UCL Q3)
(Iceland) FH (UCL Q3)	(Romania) Viitorul Constanța (UCL Q3)	(Czech Republic) Viktoria Plzeň (UCL Q3)	(Belgium) Club Brugge (UCL Q3)
(North Macedonia) Vardar (UCL Q3)	(Austria) Red Bull Salzburg (UCL Q3)	(Netherlands) Ajax (UCL Q3)	
Third qualifying round
(Spain) Athletic Bilbao (7th)	(France) Bordeaux (6th)	(Netherlands) PSV Eindhoven (3rd)	(Romania) Universitatea Craiova (5th)
(Germany) SC Freiburg (7th)	(Russia) Zenit Saint Petersburg (3rd)	(Turkey) Fenerbahçe (3rd)	Austria Wien (2nd)
(England) Everton (7th)	(Russia) Krasnodar (4th)	(Switzerland) Sion (4th)	(Croatia) Dinamo Zagreb (2nd)
(Italy) AC Milan (6th)	(Ukraine) Olimpik Donetsk (4th)	(Czech Republic) Sparta Prague (3rd)	(Poland) Arka Gdynia (CW)
(Portugal) Braga (5th)	(Ukraine) Oleksandriya (5th)	(Greece) PAOK (CW)	
(Portugal) Marítimo (6th)	(Belgium) Gent (3rd)	(Greece) Panathinaikos (3rd)	
(France) Marseille (5th)	(Belgium) Oostende (PW)	(Romania) Dinamo București (3rd)	
Second qualifying round
(Netherlands) Utrecht (PW)	(Greece) Panionios (5th)	(Cyprus) Apollon Limassol (CW)	(Israel) Bnei Yehuda (CW)
(Turkey) Galatasaray (4th)	(Romania) Astra Giurgiu (6th)	(Belarus) Dynamo Brest (CW)	(Denmark) Brøndby (2nd)
(Switzerland) Luzern (5th)	(Austria) Sturm Graz (3rd)	(Sweden) Östersunds FK (CW)	(Scotland) Aberdeen (2nd)
(Czech Republic) Mladá Boleslav (4th)	(Croatia) Hajduk Split (3rd)	(Norway) Brann (2nd)	(Azerbaijan) Gabala (2nd)
First qualifying round
(Austria) Rheindorf Altach (4th)	(Kazakhstan) Ordabasy (4th)	(Finland) VPS (4th)	(Northern Ireland) Crusaders (2nd)
(Croatia) Osijek (4th)	(Bulgaria) Botev Plovdiv (CW)	(Bosnia and Herzegovina) Široki Brijeg (CW)	(Northern Ireland) Coleraine (3rd)
(Poland) Jagiellonia Białystok (2nd)	(Bulgaria) Levski Sofia (3rd)	(Bosnia and Herzegovina) Željezničar (2nd)	(Northern Ireland) Ballymena United (PW)
(Poland) Lech Poznań (3rd)	(Bulgaria) Dunav Ruse (4th)	(Bosnia and Herzegovina) Sarajevo (3rd)	(Estonia) Levadia Tallinn (2nd)
(Cyprus) AEK Larnaca (2nd)	(Slovenia) Domžale (CW)	(Albania) Tirana (CW)	(Estonia) Nõmme Kalju (3rd)
(Cyprus) AEL Limassol (4th)	(Slovenia) Gorica (2nd)	(Albania) Partizani (2nd)	(Estonia) Flora (4th)
(Belarus) Shakhtyor Soligorsk (2nd)	(Slovenia) Olimpija Ljubljana (3rd)	(Albania) Skënderbeu (3rd)	(Armenia) Shirak (CW)
(Belarus) Dinamo Minsk (3rd)	(Slovakia) Slovan Bratislava (CW)	(North Macedonia) Pelister (CW)	(Armenia) Gandzasar Kapan (2nd)
(Sweden) AIK (2nd)	(Slovakia) Ružomberok (3rd)	(North Macedonia) Shkëndija (2nd)	(Armenia) Pyunik (4th)
(Sweden) IFK Norrköping (3rd)	(Slovakia) Trenčín (4th)	(North Macedonia) Rabotnicki (3rd)	(Faroe Islands) KÍ (CW)
(Norway) Odd (3rd)	(Liechtenstein) Vaduz (CW)	(Republic of Ireland) Cork City (CW)	(Faroe Islands) NSÍ (3rd)
(Norway) Haugesund (4th)	(Hungary) Ferencváros (CW)	(Republic of Ireland) Derry City (3rd)	(Faroe Islands) B36 (4th)
(Israel) Maccabi Tel Aviv (2nd)	(Hungary) Videoton (2nd)	(Republic of Ireland) Shamrock Rovers (4th)	(Malta) Floriana (CW)
(Israel) Beitar Jerusalem (3rd)	(Hungary) Vasas (3rd)	(Latvia) Ventspils (CW)	(Malta) Balzan (2nd)
(Denmark) Lyngby (3rd)	(Moldova) Dacia Chișinău (2nd)	(Latvia) Jelgava (2nd)	(Malta) Valletta (4th)
(Denmark) Midtjylland (PW)	(Moldova) Milsami Orhei (3rd)	(Latvia) Liepāja (4th)	(Wales) Bala Town (CW)
(Scotland) Rangers (3rd)	(Moldova) Zaria Bălți (4th)	(Luxembourg) Differdange 03 (2nd)	(Wales) Connah's Quay Nomads (2nd)
(Scotland) St Johnstone (4th)	(Iceland) Valur (CW)	(Luxembourg) Fola Esch (3rd)	(Wales) Bangor City (PW)
(Azerbaijan) Inter Baku (3rd)	(Iceland) Stjarnan (2nd)	(Luxembourg) Progrès Niederkorn (4th)	(Gibraltar) Lincoln Red Imps (2nd)
(Azerbaijan) Zira (4th)	(Iceland) KR (3rd)	(Montenegro) Sutjeska (CW)	(Gibraltar) St Joseph's (3rd)
(Serbia) Red Star Belgrade (2nd)	(Georgia (country)) Torpedo Kutaisi (CW)	(Montenegro) Zeta (2nd)	(Andorra) UE Santa Coloma (CW)
(Serbia) Vojvodina (3rd)	(Georgia (country)) Chikhura Sachkhere (2nd)	(Montenegro) Mladost Podgorica (3rd)	(Andorra) Sant Julià (2nd)
(Serbia) Mladost Lučani (4th)	(Georgia (country)) Dinamo Batumi (3rd)	(Lithuania) Trakai (2nd)	(San Marino) Tre Penne (CW)
(Kazakhstan) Kairat (2nd)	(Finland) SJK (CW)	(Lithuania) Sūduva (3rd)	(San Marino) Folgore (3rd)
(Kazakhstan) Irtysh (3rd)	(Finland) HJK (2nd)	(Lithuania) Atlantas (4th)	(Kosovo) Prishtina (2nd)

Notably two teams took part in the competition that were not playing in their national top division, Tirana (2nd tier) and Vaduz (representing Liechtenstein, playing in Swiss second tier).

Notes

1. Bulgaria (BUL): On 29 May 2017 a UEFA letter to the Bulgarian Football Union declared that CSKA Sofia, the runners-up of the 2016–17 First Professional Football League, were not allowed to compete in the Europa League as they were considered to have been re-formed as a new club and thus did not pass the "three-year rule". As this decision was appealed by CSKA Sofia, the Bulgarian Football Union granted a licence to them subject to legal proceedings. A few hours prior to the Europa League first qualifying round draw, UEFA replaced them with Dunav Ruse, the fourth-placed team of the league.
2. Kosovo (KOS): Besa Pejë would have qualified for the Europa League first qualifying round as the winners of the 2016–17 Kosovar Cup, but failed to obtain a UEFA licence. As a result, the berth was given to the runners-up of the 2016–17 Football Superleague of Kosovo, Prishtina.
3. Malta (MLT): Birkirkara would have qualified for the Europa League first qualifying round as the third-placed team of the 2016–17 Maltese Premier League, but failed to obtain a UEFA licence. As a result, the berth was given to the fourth-placed team of the league, Valletta.
4. Republic of Ireland (IRL): Derry City are a club based in Northern Ireland, but participate in the Europa League through one of the berths for the Republic of Ireland (any coefficient points they earn count toward Republic of Ireland and not Northern Ireland).
5. Romania (ROU): Voluntari would have qualified for the Europa League third qualifying round as the winners of 2016–17 Cupa României, and CFR Cluj would have qualified for the second qualifying round as the fourth-placed team of the 2016–17 Liga I, but both failed to obtain a UEFA licence. As a result, the third qualifying round berth was given to the fifth-placed team of the league, Universitatea Craiova, and the second qualifying round berth was given to the sixth-placed team of the league, Astra Giurgiu.

== Round and draw dates ==
The schedule of the competition was as follows (all draws were held at the UEFA headquarters in Nyon, Switzerland, unless stated otherwise).

Phase	Round	Draw date	First leg	Second leg
Qualifying	First qualifying round	19 June 2017	29 June 2017	6 July 2017
Qualifying	Second qualifying round	19 June 2017	13 July 2017	20 July 2017
Qualifying	Third qualifying round	14 July 2017	27 July 2017	3 August 2017
Play-off	Play-off round	4 August 2017	17 August 2017	24 August 2017
Group stage	Matchday 1	25 August 2017 (Monaco)	14 September 2017	
Group stage	Matchday 2	25 August 2017 (Monaco)	28 September 2017	
Group stage	Matchday 3	25 August 2017 (Monaco)	19 October 2017	
Group stage	Matchday 4	25 August 2017 (Monaco)	2 November 2017	
Group stage	Matchday 5	25 August 2017 (Monaco)	23 November 2017	
Group stage	Matchday 6	25 August 2017 (Monaco)	7 December 2017	
Knockout phase	Round of 32	11 December 2017	15 February 2018	22 February 2018
Knockout phase	Round of 16	23 February 2018	8 March 2018	15 March 2018
Knockout phase	Quarter-finals	16 March 2018	5 April 2018	12 April 2018
Knockout phase	Semi-finals	13 April 2018	26 April 2018	3 May 2018
Knockout phase	Final	13 April 2018	16 May 2018 at Parc Olympique Lyonnais, Décines-Charpieu	

Matches in the qualifying, play-off, and knockout rounds could also be played on Tuesdays or Wednesdays instead of the regular Thursdays due to scheduling conflicts.

== Qualifying rounds ==
In the qualifying rounds and the play-off round, teams are divided into seeded and unseeded teams based on their 2017 UEFA club coefficients, and then drawn into two-legged home-and-away ties. Teams from the same association cannot be drawn against each other.

=== First qualifying round ===
The draw for the first qualifying round was held on 19 June 2017, 13:00 CEST. The first legs were played on 29 June, and the second legs were played on 4 and 6 July 2017.

Team 1	Agg.	Team 2	1st leg	2nd leg
Maccabi Tel Aviv (Israel)	5–0	(Albania) Tirana	2–0	3–0
Mladost Lučani (Serbia)	0–5	(Azerbaijan) Inter Baku	0–3	0–2
Shirak (Armenia)	2–4	(Slovenia) Gorica	0–2	2–2
Shkëndija (North Macedonia)	7–0 (Note: Order of legs reversed after original draw.)	(Moldova) Dacia Chișinău	3–0	4–0
Trenčín (Slovakia)	8–1	(Georgia (country)) Torpedo Kutaisi	5–1	3–0
Kairat (Kazakhstan)	8–1	(Lithuania) Atlantas	6–0	2–1
Chikhura Sachkhere (Georgia (country))	1–2	(Austria) Rheindorf Altach	0–1	1–1
Zira (Azerbaijan)	4–1	(Luxembourg) Differdange 03	2–0	2–1
Levski Sofia (Bulgaria)	3–1	(Montenegro) Sutjeska	3–1	0–0
Lech Poznań (Poland)	7–0	(North Macedonia) Pelister	4–0	3–0
Beitar Jerusalem (Israel)	7–3	(Hungary) Vasas	4–3	3–0
Fola Esch (Luxembourg)	3–2	(Moldova) Milsami Orhei	2–1	1–1
Vojvodina (Serbia)	2–3	(Slovakia) Ružomberok	2–1	0–2
Irtysh (Kazakhstan)	3–0	(Bulgaria) Dunav Ruse	1–0	2–0
Mladost Podgorica (Montenegro)	4–0	(Armenia) Gandzasar Kapan	1–0	3–0
Široki Brijeg (Bosnia and Herzegovina)	2–0	(Kazakhstan) Ordabasy	2–0	0–0
Partizani (Albania)	1–4	(Bulgaria) Botev Plovdiv	1–3	0–1
Pyunik (Armenia)	1–9	(Slovakia) Slovan Bratislava	1–4	0–5
Dinamo Batumi (Georgia (country))	0–5	(Poland) Jagiellonia Białystok	0–1	0–4
Videoton (Hungary)	5–3	(Malta) Balzan	2–0	3–3
Red Star Belgrade (Serbia)	6–3	(Malta) Floriana	3–0	3–3
UE Santa Coloma (Andorra)	0–6	(Croatia) Osijek	0–2	0–4
Tre Penne (San Marino)	0–7	(North Macedonia) Rabotnicki	0–1	0–6
Željezničar (Bosnia and Herzegovina)	3–2	(Montenegro) Zeta	1–0	2–2
St Joseph's (Gibraltar)	0–10	(Cyprus) AEL Limassol	0–4	0–6
Valletta (Malta)	3–0	(San Marino) Folgore	2–0	1–0
Zaria Bălți (Moldova)	3–3 (6–5 p)	(Bosnia and Herzegovina) Sarajevo	2–1	1–2 (a.e.t.)
Rangers (Scotland)	1–2	(Luxembourg) Progrès Niederkorn	1–0	0–2
AEK Larnaca (Cyprus)	6–1	(Gibraltar) Lincoln Red Imps	5–0	1–1
Skënderbeu (Albania)	6–0	(Andorra) Sant Julià	1–0	5–0
Ventspils (Latvia)	0–1	(Iceland) Valur	0–0	0–1
Bala Town (Wales)	1–5	(Liechtenstein) Vaduz	1–2	0–3
Domžale (Slovenia)	5–2	(Estonia) Flora	2–0	3–2
Midtjylland (Denmark)	10–2	(Republic of Ireland) Derry City	6–1	4–1
Haugesund (Norway)	7–0	(Northern Ireland) Coleraine	7–0	0–0
St Johnstone (Scotland)	1–3	(Lithuania) Trakai	1–2	0–1
VPS (Finland)	2–0	(Slovenia) Olimpija Ljubljana	1–0	1–0
Crusaders (Northern Ireland)	3–3 (a)	(Latvia) Liepāja	3–1	0–2
Dinamo Minsk (Belarus)	4–1	(Faroe Islands) NSÍ	2–1	2–0
Stjarnan (Iceland)	0–2	(Republic of Ireland) Shamrock Rovers	0–1	0–1
Odd (Norway)	5–0	(Northern Ireland) Ballymena United	3–0	2–0
Connah's Quay Nomads (Wales)	1–3	(Finland) HJK	1–0	0–3
Nõmme Kalju (Estonia)	4–2	(Faroe Islands) B36	2–1	2–1
Ferencváros (Hungary)	3–0	(Latvia) Jelgava	2–0	1–0
IFK Norrköping (Sweden)	6–0	(Kosovo) Prishtina	5–0	1–0
Shakhtyor Soligorsk (Belarus)	1–2	(Lithuania) Sūduva	0–0	1–2
KR (Iceland)	2–0	(Finland) SJK	0–0	2–0
Levadia Tallinn (Estonia)	2–6	(Republic of Ireland) Cork City	0–2	2–4
Lyngby (Denmark)	4–0	(Wales) Bangor City	1–0	3–0
KÍ (Faroe Islands)	0–5	(Sweden) AIK	0–0	0–5

=== Second qualifying round ===
The draw for the second qualifying round was held on 19 June 2017, 14:30 CEST (after the completion of the first qualifying round draw). The first legs were played on 12 and 13 July, and the second legs were played on 20 July 2017.

Team 1	Agg.	Team 2	1st leg	2nd leg
Beitar Jerusalem (Israel)	1–5 (Note: Order of legs reversed after original draw.)	(Bulgaria) Botev Plovdiv	1–1	0–4
Apollon Limassol (Cyprus)	5–1	(Moldova) Zaria Bălți	3–0	2–1
Rabotnicki (North Macedonia)	1–4	(Belarus) Dinamo Minsk	1–1	0–3
Slovan Bratislava (Slovakia)	1–3	(Denmark) Lyngby	0–1	1–2
Shamrock Rovers (Republic of Ireland)	2–5	(Czech Republic) Mladá Boleslav	2–3	0–2
Željezničar (Bosnia and Herzegovina)	0–2	(Sweden) AIK	0–0	0–2
Cork City (Republic of Ireland)	0–2	(Cyprus) AEK Larnaca	0–1	0–1
Kairat (Kazakhstan)	1–3	(Albania) Skënderbeu	1–1	0–2
Panionios (Greece)	5–2	(Slovenia) Gorica	2–0	3–2
Astra Giurgiu (Romania)	3–1	(Azerbaijan) Zira	3–1	0–0
Haugesund (Norway)	3–4	(Poland) Lech Poznań	3–2	0–2
Brøndby (Denmark)	3–2	(Finland) VPS	2–0	1–2
IFK Norrköping (Sweden)	3–3 (3–5 p)	(Lithuania) Trakai	2–1	1–2 (a.e.t.)
Hajduk Split (Croatia)	3–1	(Bulgaria) Levski Sofia	1–0	2–1
Nõmme Kalju (Estonia)	1–4	(Hungary) Videoton	0–3	1–1
Maccabi Tel Aviv (Israel)	5–1	(Iceland) KR	3–1	2–0
Valletta (Malta)	1–3	(Netherlands) Utrecht	0–0	1–3
Ružomberok (Slovakia)	2–1	(Norway) Brann	0–1	2–0
Liepāja (Latvia)	1–2	(Lithuania) Sūduva	0–2	1–0
Gabala (Azerbaijan)	3–1	(Poland) Jagiellonia Białystok	1–1	2–0
Progrès Niederkorn (Luxembourg)	1–3	(Cyprus) AEL Limassol	0–1	1–2
Rheindorf Altach (Austria)	4–1	(Belarus) Dynamo Brest	1–1	3–0
Östersunds FK (Sweden)	3–1	(Turkey) Galatasaray	2–0	1–1
Inter Baku (Azerbaijan)	2–4	(Luxembourg) Fola Esch	1–0	1–4
Vaduz (Liechtenstein)	0–2	(Norway) Odd	0–1	0–1
Valur (Iceland)	3–5	(Slovenia) Domžale	1–2	2–3
Irtysh (Kazakhstan)	1–3	(Serbia) Red Star Belgrade	1–1	0–2
Aberdeen (Scotland)	3–1	(Bosnia and Herzegovina) Široki Brijeg	1–1	2–0
Ferencváros (Hungary)	3–7	(Denmark) Midtjylland	2–4	1–3
Sturm Graz (Austria)	3–1	(Montenegro) Mladost Podgorica	0–1	3–0
Shkëndija (North Macedonia)	4–2	(Finland) HJK	3–1	1–1
Trenčín (Slovakia)	1–3	(Israel) Bnei Yehuda	1–1	0–2
Osijek (Croatia)	3–2	(Switzerland) Luzern	2–0	1–2

=== Third qualifying round ===
The draw for the third qualifying round was held on 14 July 2017, 13:00 CEST. The first legs were played on 27 July, and the second legs were played on 2 and 3 August 2017.

Team 1	Agg.	Team 2	1st leg	2nd leg
PSV Eindhoven (Netherlands)	0–2	(Croatia) Osijek	0–1	0–1
Trakai (Lithuania)	2–4	(North Macedonia) Shkëndija	2–1	0–3
Krasnodar (Russia)	5–2	(Denmark) Lyngby	2–1	3–1
Sturm Graz (Austria)	2–3	(Turkey) Fenerbahçe	1–2	1–1
Panathinaikos (Greece)	3–1	(Azerbaijan) Gabala	1–0	2–1
Mladá Boleslav (Czech Republic)	3–3 (2–4 p)	(Albania) Skënderbeu	2–1	1–2 (a.e.t.)
Austria Wien	2–1	(Cyprus) AEL Limassol	0–0	2–1
Dinamo Zagreb (Croatia)	2–1	(Norway) Odd	2–1	0–0
Dinamo București (Romania)	1–4	(Spain) Athletic Bilbao	1–1	0–3
Olimpik Donetsk (Ukraine)	1–3	(Greece) PAOK	1–1	0–2
Arka Gdynia (Poland)	4–4 (a)	(Denmark) Midtjylland	3–2	1–2
Östersunds FK (Sweden)	3–1	(Luxembourg) Fola Esch	1–0	2–1
Bordeaux (France)	2–2 (a)	(Hungary) Videoton	2–1	0–1
Maccabi Tel Aviv (Israel)	2–0	(Greece) Panionios	1–0	1–0
Utrecht (Netherlands)	2–2 (a)	(Poland) Lech Poznań	0–0	2–2
Universitatea Craiova (Romania)	0–3	(Italy) Milan	0–1	0–2
Brøndby (Denmark)	0–2	(Croatia) Hajduk Split	0–0	0–2
Gent (Belgium)	2–4	(Austria) Rheindorf Altach	1–1	1–3
Astra Giurgiu (Romania)	0–1	(Ukraine) Oleksandriya	0–0	0–1
Everton (England)	2–0	(Slovakia) Ružomberok	1–0	1–0
Aberdeen (Scotland)	2–3	(Cyprus) Apollon Limassol	2–1	0–2
Red Star Belgrade (Serbia)	3–0	(Czech Republic) Sparta Prague	2–0	1–0
Botev Plovdiv (Bulgaria)	0–2	(Portugal) Marítimo	0–0	0–2
Bnei Yehuda (Israel)	1–2 (Note: Order of legs reversed after original draw.)	(Russia) Zenit Saint Petersburg	0–2	1–0
Marseille (France)	4–2	(Belgium) Oostende	4–2	0–0
SC Freiburg (Germany)	1–2	(Slovenia) Domžale	1–0	0–2
AEK Larnaca (Cyprus)	3–1	(Belarus) Dinamo Minsk	2–0	1–1
AIK (Sweden)	2–3	(Portugal) Braga	1–1	1–2 (a.e.t.)
Sūduva (Lithuania)	4–1	(Switzerland) Sion	3–0	1–1

== Play-off round ==
The draw for the play-off round was held on 4 August 2017, 13:00 CEST. The first legs were played on 16 and 17 August, and the second legs were played on 24 August 2017.

Team 1	Agg.	Team 2	1st leg	2nd leg
Milan (Italy)	7–0 (Note: Order of legs reversed after original draw.)	(North Macedonia) Shkëndija	6–0	1–0
Osijek (Croatia)	2–2 (a)	Austria Wien	1–2	1–0
Krasnodar (Russia)	4–4 (a)	(Serbia) Red Star Belgrade	3–2	1–2
Club Brugge (Belgium)	0–3	(Greece) AEK Athens	0–0	0–3
Marítimo (Portugal)	1–3	(Ukraine) Dynamo Kyiv	0–0	1–3
Panathinaikos (Greece)	2–4	(Spain) Athletic Bilbao	2–3	0–1
Apollon Limassol (Cyprus)	4–3	(Denmark) Midtjylland	3–2	1–1
FH (Iceland)	3–5	(Portugal) Braga	1–2	2–3
Everton (England)	3–1	(Croatia) Hajduk Split	2–0	1–1
Viitorul Constanța (Romania)	1–7	(Austria) Red Bull Salzburg	1–3	0–4
Vardar (North Macedonia)	4–1	(Turkey) Fenerbahçe	2–0	2–1
Ajax (Netherlands)	2–4	(Norway) Rosenborg	0–1	2–3
Rheindorf Altach (Austria)	2–3	(Israel) Maccabi Tel Aviv	0–1	2–2
BATE Borisov (Belarus)	3–2	(Ukraine) Oleksandriya	1–1	2–1
Dinamo Zagreb (Croatia)	1–1 (a)	(Albania) Skënderbeu	1–1	0–0
Ludogorets Razgrad (Bulgaria)	2–0	(Lithuania) Sūduva	2–0	0–0
Domžale (Slovenia)	1–4	(France) Marseille	1–1	0–3
Partizan (Serbia)	4–0	(Hungary) Videoton	0–0	4–0
Utrecht (Netherlands)	1–2	(Russia) Zenit Saint Petersburg	1–0	0–2 (a.e.t.)
Legia Warsaw (Poland)	1–1 (a)	(Moldova) Sheriff Tiraspol	1–1	0–0
Viktoria Plzeň (Czech Republic)	3–1	(Cyprus) AEK Larnaca	3–1	0–0
PAOK (Greece)	3–3 (a)	(Sweden) Östersunds FK	3–1	0–2

== Group stage ==
Location of teams of the 2017–18 UEFA Europa League group stage.
Red: Group A; Yellow: Group B; Green: Group C; Dark Green: Group D;
Purple: Group E; Pink: Group F; Blue: Group G; Orange: Group H;
Brown: Group I; Deep pink: Group J; Cyan: Group K; Spring green: Group L.

The draw for the group stage was held on 25 August 2017, 13:00 CEST, at the Grimaldi Forum in Monaco. The 48 teams were drawn into twelve groups of four, with the restriction that teams from the same association cannot be drawn against each other. For the draw, the teams were seeded into four pots based on their 2017 UEFA club coefficients.

In each group, teams played against each other home-and-away in a round-robin format. The group winners and runners-up advanced to the round of 32, where they were joined by the eight third-placed teams of the 2017–18 UEFA Champions League group stage. The matchdays were 14 September, 28 September, 19 October, 2 November, 23 November, and 7 December 2017.

A total of 29 national associations were represented in the group stage. Arsenal, Atalanta, Fastav Zlín, TSG Hoffenheim, İstanbul Başakşehir, 1. FC Köln, Lugano, AC Milan, Östersunds FK, Real Sociedad, Red Star Belgrade, Vardar and Vitesse made their debut appearances in the UEFA Europa League group stage (although Milan and Red Star Belgrade had appeared in the UEFA Cup group stage). Vardar were the first team from Macedonia to play in either the Champions League or Europa League group stage.

Tiebreakers

Teams were ranked according to points (3 points for a win, 1 point for a draw, 0 points for a loss), and if tied on points, the following tiebreaking criteria were applied, in the order given, to determine the rankings (Regulations Articles 16.01):

1. Points in head-to-head matches among tied teams;
2. Goal difference in head-to-head matches among tied teams;
3. Goals scored in head-to-head matches among tied teams;
4. Away goals scored in head-to-head matches among tied teams;
5. If more than two teams were tied, and after applying all head-to-head criteria above, a subset of teams were still tied, all head-to-head criteria above were reapplied exclusively to this subset of teams;
6. Goal difference in all group matches;
7. Goals scored in all group matches;
8. Away goals scored in all group matches;
9. Wins in all group matches;
10. Away wins in all group matches;
11. Disciplinary points (red card = 3 points, yellow card = 1 point, expulsion for two yellow cards in one match = 3 points);
12. UEFA club coefficient.

=== Group A ===
Pos	Team	Pld	W	D	L	GF	GA	GD	Pts	Qualification	VIL	AST	SLP	MTA
1	(Spain) Villarreal	6	3	2	1	10	6	+4	11	Advance to knockout phase	—	3–1	2–2	0–1
2	(Kazakhstan) Astana	6	3	1	2	10	7	+3	10	Advance to knockout phase	2–3	—	1–1	4–0
3	(Czech Republic) Slavia Prague	6	2	2	2	6	6	0	8		0–2	0–1	—	1–0
4	(Israel) Maccabi Tel Aviv	6	1	1	4	1	8	−7	4		0–0	0–1	0–2	—

Source: UEFA

=== Group B ===
Pos	Team	Pld	W	D	L	GF	GA	GD	Pts	Qualification	DKV	PAR	YB	SKE
1	(Ukraine) Dynamo Kyiv	6	4	1	1	15	9	+6	13	Advance to knockout phase	—	4–1	2–2	3–1
2	(Serbia) Partizan	6	2	2	2	8	9	−1	8	Advance to knockout phase	2–3	—	2–1	2–0
3	(Switzerland) Young Boys	6	1	3	2	7	8	−1	6		0–1	1–1	—	2–1
4	(Albania) Skënderbeu	6	1	2	3	6	10	−4	5		3–2	0–0	1–1	—

Source: UEFA

=== Group C ===
Pos	Team	Pld	W	D	L	GF	GA	GD	Pts	Qualification	BRA	LUD	IBS	HOF
1	(Portugal) Braga	6	3	1	2	9	8	+1	10	Advance to knockout phase	—	0–2	2–1	3–1
2	(Bulgaria) Ludogorets Razgrad	6	2	3	1	7	5	+2	9	Advance to knockout phase	1–1	—	1–2	2–1
3	(Turkey) İstanbul Başakşehir	6	2	2	2	7	8	−1	8		2–1	0–0	—	1–1
4	(Germany) TSG Hoffenheim	6	1	2	3	8	10	−2	5		1–2	1–1	3–1	—

Source: UEFA

=== Group D ===
Pos	Team	Pld	W	D	L	GF	GA	GD	Pts	Qualification	MIL	AEK	RJK	AW
1	(Italy) Milan	6	3	2	1	13	6	+7	11	Advance to knockout phase	—	0–0	3–2	5–1
2	(Greece) AEK Athens	6	1	5	0	6	5	+1	8	Advance to knockout phase	0–0	—	2–2	2–2
3	(Croatia) Rijeka	6	2	1	3	11	12	−1	7		2–0	1–2	—	1–4
4	Austria Wien	6	1	2	3	9	16	−7	5		1–5	0–0	1–3	—

Source: UEFA

=== Group E ===
Pos	Team	Pld	W	D	L	GF	GA	GD	Pts	Qualification	ATA	LYO	EVE	APL
1	(Italy) Atalanta	6	4	2	0	14	4	+10	14	Advance to knockout phase	—	1–0	3–0	3–1
2	(France) Lyon	6	3	2	1	11	4	+7	11	Advance to knockout phase	1–1	—	3–0	4–0
3	(England) Everton	6	1	1	4	7	15	−8	4		1–5	1–2	—	2–2
4	(Cyprus) Apollon Limassol	6	0	3	3	5	14	−9	3		1–1	1–1	0–3	—

Source: UEFA

=== Group F ===
Pos	Team	Pld	W	D	L	GF	GA	GD	Pts	Qualification	LOM	KOB	SHE	ZLI
1	(Russia) Lokomotiv Moscow	6	3	2	1	9	4	+5	11	Advance to knockout phase	—	2–1	1–2	3–0
2	(Denmark) Copenhagen	6	2	3	1	7	3	+4	9 (Note: Head-to-head results: Sheriff Tiraspol 0–0 Copenhagen, Copenhagen 2–0 Sheriff Tiraspol.)	Advance to knockout phase	0–0	—	2–0	3–0
3	(Moldova) Sheriff Tiraspol	6	2	3	1	4	4	0	9		1–1	0–0	—	1–0
4	(Czech Republic) Fastav Zlín	6	0	2	4	1	10	−9	2		0–2	1–1	0–0	—

Source: UEFA

=== Group G ===
Pos	Team	Pld	W	D	L	GF	GA	GD	Pts	Qualification	PLZ	FCSB	LUG	HBS
1	(Czech Republic) Viktoria Plzeň	6	4	0	2	13	8	+5	12	Advance to knockout phase	—	2–0	4–1	3–1
2	(Romania) FCSB	6	3	1	2	9	7	+2	10	Advance to knockout phase	3–0	—	1–2	1–1
3	(Switzerland) Lugano	6	3	0	3	9	11	−2	9		3–2	1–2	—	1–0
4	(Israel) Hapoel Be'er Sheva	6	1	1	4	5	10	−5	4		0–2	1–2	2–1	—

Source: UEFA

=== Group H ===
Pos	Team	Pld	W	D	L	GF	GA	GD	Pts	Qualification	ARS	ZVE	KLN	BATE
1	(England) Arsenal	6	4	1	1	14	4	+10	13	Advance to knockout phase	—	0–0	3–1	6–0
2	(Serbia) Red Star Belgrade	6	2	3	1	3	2	+1	9	Advance to knockout phase	0–1	—	1–0	1–1
3	(Germany) 1. FC Köln	6	2	0	4	7	8	−1	6		1–0	0–1	—	5–2
4	(Belarus) BATE Borisov	6	1	2	3	6	16	−10	5		2–4	0–0	1–0	—

Source: UEFA

=== Group I ===
Pos	Team	Pld	W	D	L	GF	GA	GD	Pts	Qualification	SAL	MAR	KON	VSC
1	(Austria) Red Bull Salzburg	6	3	3	0	7	1	+6	12	Advance to knockout phase	—	1–0	0–0	3–0
2	(France) Marseille	6	2	2	2	4	4	0	8	Advance to knockout phase	0–0	—	1–0	2–1
3	(Turkey) Konyaspor	6	1	3	2	4	6	−2	6		0–2	1–1	—	2–1
4	(Portugal) Vitória de Guimarães	6	1	2	3	5	9	−4	5		1–1	1–0	1–1	—

Source: UEFA

=== Group J ===
Pos	Team	Pld	W	D	L	GF	GA	GD	Pts	Qualification	ATH	OST	ZOR	HRT
1	(Spain) Athletic Bilbao	6	3	2	1	8	5	+3	11 (Note: Head-to-head results: Östersund 2–2 Athletic Bilbao, Athletic Bilbao 1–0 Östersund.)	Advance to knockout phase	—	1–0	0–1	3–2
2	(Sweden) Östersunds FK	6	3	2	1	8	4	+4	11	Advance to knockout phase	2–2	—	2–0	1–0
3	(Ukraine) Zorya Luhansk	6	2	0	4	3	9	−6	6		0–2	0–2	—	2–1
4	(Germany) Hertha BSC	6	1	2	3	6	7	−1	5		0–0	1–1	2–0	—

Source: UEFA

=== Group K ===
Pos	Team	Pld	W	D	L	GF	GA	GD	Pts	Qualification	LAZ	NCE	ZUL	VIT
1	(Italy) Lazio	6	4	1	1	12	7	+5	13	Advance to knockout phase	—	1–0	2–0	1–1
2	(France) Nice	6	3	0	3	12	7	+5	9	Advance to knockout phase	1–3	—	3–1	3–0
3	(Belgium) Zulte Waregem	6	2	1	3	8	13	−5	7		3–2	1–5	—	1–1
4	(Netherlands) Vitesse	6	1	2	3	5	10	−5	5		2–3	1–0	0–2	—

Source: UEFA

=== Group L ===
Pos	Team	Pld	W	D	L	GF	GA	GD	Pts	Qualification	ZEN	RS	ROS	VRD
1	(Russia) Zenit Saint Petersburg	6	5	1	0	17	5	+12	16	Advance to knockout phase	—	3–1	3–1	2–1
2	(Spain) Real Sociedad	6	4	0	2	16	6	+10	12	Advance to knockout phase	1–3	—	4–0	3–0
3	(Norway) Rosenborg	6	1	2	3	6	11	−5	5		1–1	0–1	—	3–1
4	(North Macedonia) Vardar	6	0	1	5	3	20	−17	1		0–5	0–6	1–1	—

Source: UEFA

== Knockout phase ==
In the knockout phase, teams played against each other over two legs on a home-and-away basis, except for the one-match final. The mechanism of the draws for each round was as follows:

- In the draw for the round of 32, the twelve group winners and the four third-placed teams from the Champions League group stage with the better group records were seeded, and the twelve group runners-up and the other four third-placed teams from the Champions League group stage were unseeded. The seeded teams were drawn against the unseeded teams, with the seeded teams hosting the second leg. Teams from the same group or the same association could not be drawn against each other.
- In the draws for the round of 16 onwards, there were no seedings, and teams from the same group or the same association could be drawn against each other.

=== Bracket ===
Round of 32
(Italy) Napoli	1	2	3
(Germany) RB Leipzig (a)	3	0	3
(Scotland) Celtic	1	0	1
(Russia) Zenit Saint Petersburg	0	3	3
(France) Marseille	3	0	3
(Portugal) Braga	0	1	1
(Russia) Spartak Moscow	1	2	3
(Spain) Athletic Bilbao	3	1	4
(Romania) FCSB	1	1	2
(Italy) Lazio	0	5	5
(Greece) AEK Athens	1	0	1
(Ukraine) Dynamo Kyiv (a)	1	0	1
(Germany) Borussia Dortmund	3	1	4
(Italy) Atalanta	2	1	3
(Spain) Real Sociedad	2	1	3
(Austria) Red Bull Salzburg	2	2	4
(Bulgaria) Ludogorets Razgrad	0	0	0
(Italy) Milan	3	1	4
(Sweden) Östersunds FK	0	2	2
(England) Arsenal	3	1	4
(Serbia) Red Star Belgrade	0	0	0
(Russia) CSKA Moscow	0	1	1
(France) Lyon	3	1	4
(Spain) Villarreal	1	0	1
(Denmark) Copenhagen	1	0	1
(Spain) Atlético Madrid	4	1	5
(France) Nice	2	0	2
(Russia) Lokomotiv Moscow	3	1	4
(Kazakhstan) Astana	1	3	4
(Portugal) Sporting CP	3	3	6
(Serbia) Partizan	1	0	1
(Czech Republic) Viktoria Plzeň	1	2	3

Round of 16
(Germany) RB Leipzig	2	1	3
(Russia) Zenit Saint Petersburg	1	1	2
(France) Marseille	3	2	5
(Spain) Athletic Bilbao	1	1	2
(Italy) Lazio	2	2	4
(Ukraine) Dynamo Kyiv	2	0	2
(Germany) Borussia Dortmund	1	0	1
(Austria) Red Bull Salzburg	2	0	2
(Italy) Milan	0	1	1
(England) Arsenal	2	3	5
(Russia) CSKA Moscow (a)	0	3	3
(France) Lyon	1	2	3
(Spain) Atlético Madrid	3	5	8
(Russia) Lokomotiv Moscow	0	1	1
(Portugal) Sporting CP (a.e.t.)	2	1	3
(Czech Republic) Viktoria Plzeň	0	2	2

Quarter-finals
(Germany) RB Leipzig	1	2	3
(France) Marseille	0	5	5
(Italy) Lazio	4	1	5
(Austria) Red Bull Salzburg	2	4	6
(England) Arsenal	4	2	6
(Russia) CSKA Moscow	1	2	3
(Spain) Atlético Madrid	2	0	2
(Portugal) Sporting CP	0	1	1

Semi-finals
(France) Marseille (a.e.t.)	2	1	3
(Austria) Red Bull Salzburg	0	2	2
(England) Arsenal	1	0	1
(Spain) Atlético Madrid	1	1	2

Final
16 May – Décines-Charpieu
(France) Marseille	0
(Spain) Atlético Madrid	3

=== Round of 32 ===
The draw for the round of 32 was held on 11 December 2017, 13:00 CET. The first legs were played on 13 and 15 February, and the second legs were played on 21 and 22 February 2018.

Team 1	Agg.	Team 2	1st leg	2nd leg
Borussia Dortmund (Germany)	4–3	(Italy) Atalanta	3–2	1–1
Nice (France)	2–4	(Russia) Lokomotiv Moscow	2–3	0–1
Copenhagen (Denmark)	1–5	(Spain) Atlético Madrid	1–4	0–1
Spartak Moscow (Russia)	3–4	(Spain) Athletic Bilbao	1–3	2–1
AEK Athens (Greece)	1–1 (a)	(Ukraine) Dynamo Kyiv	1–1	0–0
Celtic (Scotland)	1–3	(Russia) Zenit Saint Petersburg	1–0	0–3
Napoli (Italy)	3–3 (a)	(Germany) RB Leipzig	1–3	2–0
Red Star Belgrade (Serbia)	0–1	(Russia) CSKA Moscow	0–0	0–1
Lyon (France)	4–1	(Spain) Villarreal	3–1	1–0
Real Sociedad (Spain)	3–4	(Austria) Red Bull Salzburg	2–2	1–2
Partizan (Serbia)	1–3	(Czech Republic) Viktoria Plzeň	1–1	0–2
FCSB (Romania)	2–5	(Italy) Lazio	1–0	1–5
Ludogorets Razgrad (Bulgaria)	0–4	(Italy) Milan	0–3	0–1
Astana (Kazakhstan)	4–6	(Portugal) Sporting CP	1–3	3–3
Östersunds FK (Sweden)	2–4	(England) Arsenal	0–3	2–1
Marseille (France)	3–1	(Portugal) Braga	3–0	0–1

=== Round of 16 ===
The draw for the round of 16 was held on 23 February 2018, 13:00 CET. The first legs were played on 8 March, and the second legs were played on 15 March 2018.

Team 1	Agg.	Team 2	1st leg	2nd leg
Lazio (Italy)	4–2	(Ukraine) Dynamo Kyiv	2–2	2–0
RB Leipzig (Germany)	3–2	(Russia) Zenit Saint Petersburg	2–1	1–1
Atlético Madrid (Spain)	8–1	(Russia) Lokomotiv Moscow	3–0	5–1
CSKA Moscow (Russia)	3–3 (a)	(France) Lyon	0–1	3–2
Marseille (France)	5–2	(Spain) Athletic Bilbao	3–1	2–1
Sporting CP (Portugal)	3–2	(Czech Republic) Viktoria Plzeň	2–0	1–2 (a.e.t.)
Borussia Dortmund (Germany)	1–2	(Austria) Red Bull Salzburg	1–2	0–0
Milan (Italy)	1–5	(England) Arsenal	0–2	1–3

=== Quarter-finals ===
The draw for the quarter-finals was held on 16 March 2018, 13:00 CET. The first legs were played on 5 April, and the second legs were played on 12 April 2018.

Team 1	Agg.	Team 2	1st leg	2nd leg
RB Leipzig (Germany)	3–5	(France) Marseille	1–0	2–5
Arsenal (England)	6–3	(Russia) CSKA Moscow	4–1	2–2
Atlético Madrid (Spain)	2–1	(Portugal) Sporting CP	2–0	0–1
Lazio (Italy)	5–6	(Austria) Red Bull Salzburg	4–2	1–4

=== Semi-finals ===
The draw for the semi-finals was held on 13 April 2018, 12:00 CEST. The first legs were played on 26 April, and the second legs were played on 3 May 2018.

Team 1	Agg.	Team 2	1st leg	2nd leg
Marseille (France)	3–2	(Austria) Red Bull Salzburg	2–0	1–2 (a.e.t.)
Arsenal (England)	1–2	(Spain) Atlético Madrid	1–1	0–1

=== Final ===
The final was played at the Parc Olympique Lyonnais in Décines-Charpieu on 16 May 2018. The "home" team (for administrative purposes) was determined by an additional draw held after the semi-final draw.

16 May 2018
20:45 UTC+2

Marseille (France)	0–3	(Spain) Atlético Madrid
	Report	Griezmann 21', 49'; Gabi 89'

Parc Olympique Lyonnais, Décines-Charpieu
Attendance: 55,768
Referee: Björn Kuipers (Netherlands)

== Statistics ==
Statistics exclude qualifying rounds and play-off round.

=== Top goalscorers ===
Rank	Player	Team	Goals	Minutes played
1	(Italy) Ciro Immobile	(Italy) Lazio	8	582
1	(Spain) Aritz Aduriz	(Spain) Athletic Bilbao	8	801
3	(Brazil) Júnior Moraes	(Ukraine) Dynamo Kyiv	7	742
4	(Italy) Mario Balotelli	(France) Nice	6	528
4	(France) Antoine Griezmann	(Spain) Atlético Madrid	6	631
4	(Russia) Aleksandr Kokorin	(Russia) Zenit Saint Petersburg	6	698
4	(Portugal) André Silva	(Italy) AC Milan	6	722
4	(Argentina) Emiliano Rigoni	(Russia) Zenit Saint Petersburg	6	775
4	(Portugal) Manuel Fernandes	(Russia) Lokomotiv Moscow	6	900
10	(France) Harlem Gnohéré	(Romania) FCSB	5	344
10	(Brazil) Willian José	(Spain) Real Sociedad	5	384
10	(Ghana) Patrick Twumasi	(Kazakhstan) Astana	5	717
10	(Kosovo) Valon Berisha	(Austria) Red Bull Salzburg	5	1138
10	(Israel) Mu'nas Dabbur	(Austria) Red Bull Salzburg	5	1286

=== Top assists ===
Rank	Player	Team	Assists	Minutes played
1	(France) Dimitri Payet	(France) Marseille	7	811
2	(Spain) Sergio Canales	(Spain) Real Sociedad	6	557
3	(Spain) Luis Alberto	(Italy) Lazio	5	644
3	(Austria) Stefan Lainer	(Austria) Red Bull Salzburg	5	1290
5	(England) Theo Walcott	(England) Arsenal	4	424
5	(Spain) Xabi Prieto	(Spain) Real Sociedad	4	483
5	(Austria) Raphael Holzhauser	Austria Wien	4	536
5	(Portugal) Bruno Fernandes	(Portugal) Sporting CP	4	567
5	(Germany) Mesut Özil	(England) Arsenal	4	609
5	(Turkey) Hakan Çalhanoğlu	(Italy) AC Milan	4	613
5	(Russia) Aleksei Miranchuk	(Russia) Lokomotiv Moscow	4	784

=== Squad of the season ===
The UEFA technical study group selected the following 18 players as the squad of the tournament.

Pos.	Player	Team
GK	(Slovenia) Jan Oblak	(Spain) Atlético Madrid
GK	(Portugal) Rui Patrício	(Portugal) Sporting CP
DF	(Italy) Leonardo Bonucci	(Italy) AC Milan
DF	(Uruguay) Diego Godín	(Spain) Atlético Madrid
DF	(Austria) Stefan Lainer	(Austria) Red Bull Salzburg
DF	(Brazil) Luiz Gustavo	(France) Marseille
DF	(France) Bouna Sarr	(France) Marseille
MF	(Portugal) Bruno Fernandes	(Portugal) Sporting CP
MF	(Guinea) Naby Keïta	(Germany) RB Leipzig
MF	(Spain) Koke	(Spain) Atlético Madrid
MF	(Spain) Saúl	(Spain) Atlético Madrid
MF	(Spain) Gabi	(Spain) Atlético Madrid
MF	(Mali) Diadie Samassékou	(Austria) Red Bull Salzburg
FW	(Portugal) Gelson Martins	(Portugal) Sporting CP
FW	(France) Antoine Griezmann	(Spain) Atlético Madrid
FW	(Italy) Ciro Immobile	(Italy) Lazio
FW	(France) Dimitri Payet	(France) Marseille
FW	(Germany) Timo Werner	(Germany) RB Leipzig

=== Player of the season ===
Votes were cast by coaches of the 48 teams in the group stage, together with 55 journalists selected by the European Sports Media (ESM) group, representing each of UEFA's member associations. The coaches were not allowed to vote for players from their own teams. Jury members selected their top three players, with the first receiving five points, the second three and the third one. The shortlist of the top three players was announced on 9 August 2018. The award winner was announced during the 2018–19 UEFA Europa League group stage draw in Monaco on 31 August 2018.

Rank	Player	Team	Points
Shortlist of top three
1	(France) Antoine Griezmann	(Spain) Atlético Madrid	388
2	(France) Dimitri Payet	(France) Marseille	103
3	(Uruguay) Diego Godín	(Spain) Atlético Madrid	84
Players ranked 4–10
4	(Slovenia) Jan Oblak	(Spain) Atlético Madrid	43
5	(Italy) Ciro Immobile	(Italy) Lazio	26
6	(Spain) Aritz Aduriz	(Spain) Athletic Bilbao	16
6	(Spain) Koke	(Spain) Atlético Madrid	16
8	(Brazil) Luiz Gustavo	(France) Marseille	10
8	(France) Florian Thauvin	(France) Marseille	10
10	(Serbia) Sergej Milinković-Savić	(Italy) Lazio	8

== See also ==
- 2017–18 UEFA Champions League
- 2018 UEFA Super Cup
