= 2017–18 UEFA Europa League qualifying (first and second round matches) =

European football competition

This page summarises the matches of the first and second qualifying rounds of 2017–18 UEFA Europa League qualifying.

Times are CEST (UTC+2), as listed by UEFA (local times, if different, are in parentheses).

== First qualifying round ==
=== Summary ===
The first legs were played on 29 June, and the second legs were played on 4 and 6 July 2017.

Team 1	Agg.	Team 2	1st leg	2nd leg
Maccabi Tel Aviv (Israel)	5–0	(Albania) Tirana	2–0	3–0
Mladost Lučani (Serbia)	0–5	(Azerbaijan) Inter Baku	0–3	0–2
Shirak (Armenia)	2–4	(Slovenia) Gorica	0–2	2–2
Shkëndija (North Macedonia)	7–0 (Note: Order of legs reversed after original draw.)	(Moldova) Dacia Chișinău	3–0	4–0
Trenčín (Slovakia)	8–1	(Georgia (country)) Torpedo Kutaisi	5–1	3–0
Kairat (Kazakhstan)	8–1	(Lithuania) Atlantas	6–0	2–1
Chikhura Sachkhere (Georgia (country))	1–2	(Austria) Rheindorf Altach	0–1	1–1
Zira (Azerbaijan)	4–1	(Luxembourg) Differdange 03	2–0	2–1
Levski Sofia (Bulgaria)	3–1	(Montenegro) Sutjeska	3–1	0–0
Lech Poznań (Poland)	7–0	(North Macedonia) Pelister	4–0	3–0
Beitar Jerusalem (Israel)	7–3	(Hungary) Vasas	4–3	3–0
Fola Esch (Luxembourg)	3–2	(Moldova) Milsami Orhei	2–1	1–1
Vojvodina (Serbia)	2–3	(Slovakia) Ružomberok	2–1	0–2
Irtysh (Kazakhstan)	3–0	(Bulgaria) Dunav Ruse	1–0	2–0
Mladost Podgorica (Montenegro)	4–0	(Armenia) Gandzasar Kapan	1–0	3–0
Široki Brijeg (Bosnia and Herzegovina)	2–0	(Kazakhstan) Ordabasy	2–0	0–0
Partizani (Albania)	1–4	(Bulgaria) Botev Plovdiv	1–3	0–1
Pyunik (Armenia)	1–9	(Slovakia) Slovan Bratislava	1–4	0–5
Dinamo Batumi (Georgia (country))	0–5	(Poland) Jagiellonia Białystok	0–1	0–4
Videoton (Hungary)	5–3	(Malta) Balzan	2–0	3–3
Red Star Belgrade (Serbia)	6–3	(Malta) Floriana	3–0	3–3
UE Santa Coloma (Andorra)	0–6	(Croatia) Osijek	0–2	0–4
Tre Penne (San Marino)	0–7	(North Macedonia) Rabotnicki	0–1	0–6
Željezničar (Bosnia and Herzegovina)	3–2	(Montenegro) Zeta	1–0	2–2
St Joseph's (Gibraltar)	0–10	(Cyprus) AEL Limassol	0–4	0–6
Valletta (Malta)	3–0	(San Marino) Folgore	2–0	1–0
Zaria Bălți (Moldova)	3–3 (6–5 p)	(Bosnia and Herzegovina) Sarajevo	2–1	1–2 (a.e.t.)
Rangers (Scotland)	1–2	(Luxembourg) Progrès Niederkorn	1–0	0–2
AEK Larnaca (Cyprus)	6–1	(Gibraltar) Lincoln Red Imps	5–0	1–1
Skënderbeu (Albania)	6–0	(Andorra) Sant Julià	1–0	5–0
Ventspils (Latvia)	0–1	(Iceland) Valur	0–0	0–1
Bala Town (Wales)	1–5	(Liechtenstein) Vaduz	1–2	0–3
Domžale (Slovenia)	5–2	(Estonia) Flora	2–0	3–2
Midtjylland (Denmark)	10–2	(Republic of Ireland) Derry City	6–1	4–1
Haugesund (Norway)	7–0	(Northern Ireland) Coleraine	7–0	0–0
St Johnstone (Scotland)	1–3	(Lithuania) Trakai	1–2	0–1
VPS (Finland)	2–0	(Slovenia) Olimpija Ljubljana	1–0	1–0
Crusaders (Northern Ireland)	3–3 (a)	(Latvia) Liepāja	3–1	0–2
Dinamo Minsk (Belarus)	4–1	(Faroe Islands) NSÍ	2–1	2–0
Stjarnan (Iceland)	0–2	(Republic of Ireland) Shamrock Rovers	0–1	0–1
Odd (Norway)	5–0	(Northern Ireland) Ballymena United	3–0	2–0
Connah's Quay Nomads (Wales)	1–3	(Finland) HJK	1–0	0–3
Nõmme Kalju (Estonia)	4–2	(Faroe Islands) B36	2–1	2–1
Ferencváros (Hungary)	3–0	(Latvia) Jelgava	2–0	1–0
IFK Norrköping (Sweden)	6–0	(Kosovo) Prishtina	5–0	1–0
Shakhtyor Soligorsk (Belarus)	1–2	(Lithuania) Sūduva	0–0	1–2
KR (Iceland)	2–0	(Finland) SJK	0–0	2–0
Levadia Tallinn (Estonia)	2–6	(Republic of Ireland) Cork City	0–2	2–4
Lyngby (Denmark)	4–0	(Wales) Bangor City	1–0	3–0
KÍ (Faroe Islands)	0–5	(Sweden) AIK	0–0	0–5

=== Matches ===
29 June 2017
20:00

Maccabi Tel Aviv (Israel)	2–0	(Albania) Tirana
Cohen 27'; Dasa 64'	Report

Netanya Stadium, Netanya (Note: Maccabi Tel Aviv played their home matches at Netanya Stadium, Netanya, instead of their regular stadium Bloomfield Stadium, Tel Aviv, due to renovation.)
Attendance: 7,098
Referee: Tihomir Pejin (Croatia)
6 July 2017
17:00

Tirana (Albania)	0–3	(Israel) Maccabi Tel Aviv
	Report	Schoenfeld 50'; Yitzhaki 80'; Rikan 86'

Selman Stërmasi Stadium, Tirana
Attendance: 400
Referee: Sándor Andó-Szabó (Hungary)

Maccabi Tel Aviv won 5–0 on aggregate.

29 June 2017
20:30

Mladost Lučani (Serbia)	0–3	(Azerbaijan) Inter Baku
	Report	Scarlatache 23', 41'; R. Aliyev 75'

Mladost Stadium, Lučani
Attendance: 1,950
Referee: Aleksei Matyunin (Russia)
6 July 2017
19:00

Inter Baku (Azerbaijan)	2–0	(Serbia) Mladost Lučani
Denis Silva 23'; Hajiyev 74'	Report

Dalga Arena, Baku (Note: Inter Baku played their home matches at Dalga Arena, Baku, instead of their regular stadium Inter Arena, Baku.)
Attendance: 3,150
Referee: Mykola Balakin (Ukraine)

Inter Baku won 5–0 on aggregate.

29 June 2017
14:00

Shirak (Armenia)	0–2	(Slovenia) Gorica
	Report	Kapić 15', 69'

City Stadium, Gyumri
Attendance: 2,100
Referee: Mikhail Vilkov (Russia)
6 July 2017
20:30

Gorica (Slovenia)	2–2	(Armenia) Shirak
Prljević 13' (o.g.); Osuji 90+2'	Report	Kaba 34'; Bichakhchyan 56'

Sports Park, Nova Gorica
Attendance: 1,200
Referee: Peter Kjærsgaard-Andersen (Denmark)

Gorica won 4–2 on aggregate.

29 June 2017
18:00

Shkëndija (North Macedonia)	3–0	(Moldova) Dacia Chișinău
Ibraimi 7' (pen.); Radeski 10', 75'	Report

Stadion Mladost, Strumica (Note: Shkëndija played their qualifying rounds home matches at Stadion Mladost, Strumica, and play-off round home match at Philip II Arena, Skopje, instead of their regular stadium Ecolog Arena, Tetovo, due to renovation.)
Attendance: 1,950
Referee: Krzysztof Jakubik (Poland)
6 July 2017
16:00

Dacia Chișinău (Moldova)	0–4	(North Macedonia) Shkëndija
	Report	Alimi 32'; Júnior 45'; Zejnullahi 81'; Hasani 89' (pen.)

Stadionul Moldova, Speia
Attendance: 200
Referee: Peter Kralović (Slovakia)

Shkëndija won 7–0 on aggregate.

29 June 2017
17:20

Trenčín (Slovakia)	5–1	(Georgia (country)) Torpedo Kutaisi
Mance 36', 40'; Čataković 75'; Paur 81'; Beridze 87'	Report	Guruli 10'

Štadión na Sihoti, Trenčín
Attendance: 2,915
Referee: Tim Marshall (Northern Ireland)
6 July 2017
19:00

Torpedo Kutaisi (Georgia (country))	0–3	(Slovakia) Trenčín
	Report	Gong 21', 64'; Beridze 49'

Ramaz Shengelia Stadium, Kutaisi
Attendance: 4,221
Referee: Mario Zebec (Croatia)

Trenčín won 8–1 on aggregate.

29 June 2017
16:45

Kairat (Kazakhstan)	6–0	(Lithuania) Atlantas
Gohou 21', 50' (pen.); Arshavin 26' (pen.), 42'; Iličević 30', 73'	Report

Central Stadium, Almaty
Attendance: 15,000
Referee: Omar Pashayev (Azerbaijan)
6 July 2017
18:00

Atlantas (Lithuania)	1–2	(Kazakhstan) Kairat
Ciofu 12'	Report	Iličević 35' (pen.); Gohou 39'

Klaipėdos centrinis stadionas, Klaipėda
Attendance: 1,450
Referee: Nicolas Laforge (Belgium)

Kairat won 8–1 on aggregate.

29 June 2017
18:00

Chikhura Sachkhere (Georgia (country))	0–1	(Austria) Rheindorf Altach
	Report	Ngwat-Mahop 4'

Boris Paichadze Dinamo Arena, Tbilisi (Note: Chikhura Sachkhere played their home match at Boris Paichadze Dinamo Arena, Tbilisi, instead of their regular stadium Central Stadium, Sachkhere.)
Attendance: 1,700
Referee: Erez Papir (Israel)
6 July 2017
20:30

Rheindorf Altach (Austria)	1–1	(Georgia (country)) Chikhura Sachkhere
Nutz 29'	Report	Tatanashvili 57'

Stadion Schnabelholz, Altach
Attendance: 3,335
Referee: Veaceslav Banari (Moldova)

Rheindorf Altach won 2–1 on aggregate.

29 June 2017
19:00

Zira (Azerbaijan)	2–0	(Luxembourg) Differdange 03
Gadze 22'; Belfort 80'	Report

Dalga Arena, Baku (Note: Zira played their home matches at Dalga Arena, Baku, instead of their regular stadium Zira Olympic Sport Complex Stadium, Zirə.)
Attendance: 4,650
Referee: Daniyar Sakhi (Kazakhstan)
6 July 2017
19:00

Differdange 03 (Luxembourg)	1–2	(Azerbaijan) Zira
Vandenbroeck 10'	Report	Manga 64'; Gadze 68'

Stade Municipal, Differdange
Attendance: 1,626
Referee: Boris Marhefka (Slovakia)

Zira won 4–1 on aggregate.

29 June 2017
19:00

Levski Sofia (Bulgaria)	3–1	(Montenegro) Sutjeska
Mapuku 1', 21'; Procházka 45+1'	Report	Marković 79'

Vivacom Arena - Georgi Asparuhov Stadium, Sofia
Attendance: 6,456
Referee: Martin Lundby (Norway)
6 July 2017
20:30

Sutjeska (Montenegro)	0–0	(Bulgaria) Levski Sofia
	Report

Gradski stadion, Nikšić
Attendance: 3,500
Referee: Dimitrios Massias (Cyprus)

Levski Sofia won 3–1 on aggregate.

29 June 2017
20:45

Lech Poznań (Poland)	4–0	(North Macedonia) Pelister
Nielsen 28' (pen.); Šitum 30', 57'; Majewski 38'	Report

INEA Stadion, Poznań
Attendance: 18,215
Referee: Luís Godinho (Portugal)
6 July 2017
17:00

Pelister (North Macedonia)	0–3	(Poland) Lech Poznań
	Report	Trałka 39'; Jevtić 66'; Jóźwiak 77'

Stadion Mladost, Strumica (Note: Pelister played their home match at Stadion Mladost, Strumica, instead of their regular stadium Stadion Tumbe Kafe, Bitola.)
Attendance: 750
Referee: François Letexier (France)

Lech Poznań won 7–0 on aggregate.

29 June 2017
18:45

Beitar Jerusalem (Israel)	4–3	(Hungary) Vasas
Georginho 19'; Benayoun 88'; Vered 90+1'; Sabo 90+2'	Report	Pavlov 36', 43'; Kulcsár 52'

HaMoshava Stadium, Petah Tikva (Note: Beitar Jerusalem played their home matches at HaMoshava Stadium, Petah Tikva, instead of their regular stadium Teddy Stadium, Jerusalem, due to the 2017 Maccabiah Games.)
Attendance: 100 (Note: The match was played behind closed doors.)
Referee: Nenad Đokić (Serbia)
6 July 2017
20:30

Vasas (Hungary)	0–3	(Israel) Beitar Jerusalem
	Report	Ezra 10', 61'; Varenne 90+1'

Szusza Ferenc stadion, Budapest (Note: Vasas played their home match at Szusza Ferenc stadion, Budapest, instead of their regular stadium Illovszky Rudolf Stadion, Budapest, due to reconstruction.)
Attendance: 4,016
Referee: Fábio Veríssimo (Portugal)

Beitar Jerusalem won 7–3 on aggregate.

29 June 2017
19:30

Fola Esch (Luxembourg)	2–1	(Moldova) Milsami Orhei
Dallevedove 4'; Hadji 80'	Report	Plătică 81'

Stade Émile Mayrisch, Esch-sur-Alzette
Attendance: 989
Referee: Dennis Antamo (Finland)
6 July 2017
17:00

Milsami Orhei (Moldova)	1–1	(Luxembourg) Fola Esch
Antoniuc 37'	Report	Dallevedove 58'

CSR Orhei, Orhei
Attendance: 2,800
Referee: Roomer Tarajev (Estonia)

Fola Esch won 3–2 on aggregate.

29 June 2017
20:00

Vojvodina (Serbia)	2–1	(Slovakia) Ružomberok
Malbašić 8', 21'	Report	Daniel 81'

Karađorđe Stadium, Novi Sad
Attendance: 5,093
Referee: Halil Umut Meler (Turkey)
6 July 2017
19:00

Ružomberok (Slovakia)	2–0	(Serbia) Vojvodina
Kovačević 67' (o.g.); J. Maslo 87'	Report

Štadión pod Čebraťom, Ružomberok
Attendance: 4,486
Referee: Dennis Higler (Netherlands)

Ružomberok won 3–2 on aggregate.

29 June 2017
16:00

Irtysh (Kazakhstan)	1–0	(Bulgaria) Dunav Ruse
Bugaiov 5'	Report

Central Stadium, Pavlodar
Attendance: 8,000
Referee: Arnold Hunter (Northern Ireland)
6 July 2017
19:00

Dunav Ruse (Bulgaria)	0–2	(Kazakhstan) Irtysh
	Report	Maslać 6'; Darabayev 88'

Gradski Stadium, Ruse
Attendance: 5,100
Referee: Jovan Kaludjerović (Montenegro)

Irtysh won 3–0 on aggregate.

29 June 2017
20:30

Mladost Podgorica (Montenegro)	1–0	(Armenia) Gandzasar Kapan
Đurišić 57' (pen.)	Report

City Stadium, Podgorica (Note: Mladost Podgorica played their home matches at City Stadium, Podgorica, instead of their regular stadium Stadion FK Mladost, Podgorica.)
Attendance: 2,369
Referee: Paul McLaughlin (Republic of Ireland)
6 July 2017
18:00

Gandzasar Kapan (Armenia)	0–3	(Montenegro) Mladost Podgorica
	Report	Petrović 68'; Kaluđerović 90+2'; Raičević 90+4'

Vazgen Sargsyan Republican Stadium, Yerevan (Note: Gandzasar Kapan played their home match at Vazgen Sargsyan Republican Stadium, Yerevan, instead of their regular stadium Gandzasar Stadium, Kapan.)
Attendance: 2,470
Referee: Sascha Amhof (Switzerland)

Mladost Podgorica won 4–0 on aggregate.

29 June 2017
20:30

Široki Brijeg (Bosnia and Herzegovina)	2–0	(Kazakhstan) Ordabasy
Krstanović 37' (pen.), 45+1'	Report

Stadion Pecara, Široki Brijeg
Attendance: 3,100
Referee: Ferenc Karakó (Hungary)
6 July 2017
17:00

Ordabasy (Kazakhstan)	0–0	(Bosnia and Herzegovina) Široki Brijeg
	Report

Central Stadium, Almaty (Note: Ordabasy played their home match at Central Stadium, Almaty, instead of their regular stadium Kazhymukan Munaitpasov Stadium, Shymkent.)
Attendance: 1,820
Referee: Zaven Hovhannisyan (Armenia)

Široki Brijeg won 2–0 on aggregate.

29 June 2017
17:00

Partizani (Albania)	1–3	(Bulgaria) Botev Plovdiv
Sukaj 5'	Report	Kossoko 27', 88'; Nedelev 62'

Selman Stërmasi Stadium, Tirana
Attendance: 2,000
Referee: Bryn Markham-Jones (Wales)
6 July 2017
19:00

Botev Plovdiv (Bulgaria)	1–0	(Albania) Partizani
Brisola 22'	Report

Lazur Stadium, Burgas (Note: Botev Plovdiv played their home matches at Lazur Stadium, Burgas, instead of their temporary stadium Botev 1912 Football Complex, Plovdiv.)
Attendance: 3,560
Referee: Alper Ulusoy (Turkey)

Botev Plovdiv won 4–1 on aggregate.

29 June 2017
17:00

Pyunik (Armenia)	1–4	(Slovakia) Slovan Bratislava
Avetisyan 7' (pen.)	Report	Hološko 22', 68'; Savićević 62'; Shakhnazaryan 75' (o.g.)

Vazgen Sargsyan Republican Stadium, Yerevan (Note: Pyunik played their home match at Vazgen Sargsyan Republican Stadium, Yerevan, instead of their regular stadium Football Academy Stadium, Yerevan.)
Attendance: 1,800
Referee: Ádám Farkas (Hungary)
6 July 2017
19:00

Slovan Bratislava (Slovakia)	5–0	(Armenia) Pyunik
Mareš 10', 23', 64'; De Kamps 62'; Sekulić 66'	Report

Štadión Pasienky, Bratislava
Attendance: 1,602
Referee: Bojan Nikolić (Serbia)

Slovan Bratislava won 9–1 on aggregate.

29 June 2017
18:00

Dinamo Batumi (Georgia (country))	0–1	(Poland) Jagiellonia Białystok
	Report	Sheridan 49'

Ramaz Shengelia Stadium, Kutaisi (Note: Dinamo Batumi played their home match at Ramaz Shengelia Stadium, Kutaisi, instead of their regular stadium Chele Arena, Kobuleti.)
Attendance: 4,000
Referee: Erik Lambrechts (Belgium)
6 July 2017
20:30

Jagiellonia Białystok (Poland)	4–0	(Georgia (country)) Dinamo Batumi
Tomelin 58'; Černych 81'; Runje 88'; Sekulski 90+3'	Report

City Stadium, Białystok
Attendance: 13,538
Referee: Yuriy Mozharovsky (Ukraine)

Jagiellonia Białystok won 5–0 on aggregate.

29 June 2017
20:45

Videoton (Hungary)	2–0	(Malta) Balzan
Šćepović 79'; Lazović 90+4'	Report

Pancho Aréna, Felcsút (Note: Videoton played their home matches at Pancho Aréna, Felcsút, instead of their regular stadium Sóstói Stadion, Székesfehérvár, due to reconstruction.)
Attendance: 2,188
Referee: Dejan Jakimovski (Macedonia)
4 July 2017
17:45

Balzan (Malta)	3–3	(Hungary) Videoton
Kaljević 3', 86' (pen.); Effiong 56'	Report	Géresi 15'; Šćepović 23'; Juhász 80'

Hibernians Stadium, Paola
Attendance: 550
Referee: Filip Glova (Slovakia)

Videoton won 5–3 on aggregate.

29 June 2017
20:30

Red Star Belgrade (Serbia)	3–0	(Malta) Floriana
Boakye 45+5' (pen.), 89'; Srnić 78'	Report

Rajko Mitić Stadium, Belgrade
Attendance: 19,823
Referee: Mattias Gestranius (Finland)
6 July 2017
20:30

Floriana (Malta)	3–3	(Serbia) Red Star Belgrade
Pisani 45+3' (pen.); Vella 78'; Varela 84'	Report	Boakye 13', 70'; Milijaš 76'

Hibernians Stadium, Paola (Note: Floriana played their home match at Hibernians Stadium, Paola, instead of their regular stadium Independence Ground, Floriana.)
Attendance: 1,176
Referee: Georgios Kyzas (Greece)

Red Star Belgrade won 6–3 on aggregate.

29 June 2017
19:00

UE Santa Coloma (Andorra)	0–2	(Croatia) Osijek
	Report	Mioč 80'; Lukić 90+6'

Estadi Comunal, Andorra la Vella
Attendance: 600
Referee: Farrugia Cann Trustin (Malta)
6 July 2017
20:45

Osijek (Croatia)	4–0	(Andorra) UE Santa Coloma
Ejupi 8'; Barišić 40' (pen.); Bočkaj 56', 62'	Report

Stadion Gradski vrt, Osijek
Attendance: 4,682
Referee: Keith Kennedy (Northern Ireland)

Osijek won 6–0 on aggregate.

29 June 2017
20:30

Tre Penne (San Marino)	0–1	(North Macedonia) Rabotnicki
	Report	Mitrev 90'

San Marino Stadium, Serravalle
Attendance: 294
Referee: Jason Lee Barcelo (Gibraltar)
6 July 2017
17:30

Rabotnicki (North Macedonia)	6–0	(San Marino) Tre Penne
Sahiti 28'; Najdenov 43', 59'; Markoski 71'; Velinov 82', 83'	Report

Training Centre Petar Miloševski, Skopje (Note: Rabotnički played their home matches at Training Centre Petar Miloševski, Skopje, instead of their regular stadium Philip II Arena, Skopje, which was unavailable due to preparation for the 2017 UEFA Super Cup.)
Attendance: 500
Referee: Manfredas Lukjančukas (Lithuania)

Rabotnicki won 7–0 on aggregate.

29 June 2017
20:45

Željezničar (Bosnia and Herzegovina)	1–0	(Montenegro) Zeta
Lendrić 48'	Report

Stadion Grbavica, Sarajevo
Attendance: 8,858
Referee: Kirill Levnikov (Russia)
6 July 2017
20:30

Zeta (Montenegro)	2–2	(Bosnia and Herzegovina) Željezničar
Kukuličić 29'; Krštović 76'	Report	Zakarić 32'; Lendrić 61'

City Stadium, Podgorica (Note: Zeta played their home match at City Stadium, Podgorica, instead of their regular stadium Stadion Trešnjica, Golubovci.)
Attendance: 2,500
Referee: Tiago Martins (Portugal)

Željezničar won 3–2 on aggregate.

29 June 2017
20:45

St Joseph's (Gibraltar)	0–4	(Cyprus) AEL Limassol
	Report	Arruabarrena 4'; Mesca 51'; Lafrance 64', 71'

Estádio Algarve, Faro–Loulé, Portugal (Note: St Joseph's and Lincoln Red Imps played their home matches at Estádio Algarve, Faro–Loulé, Portugal, instead of their regular stadium Victoria Stadium, Gibraltar.)
Attendance: 163
Referee: Petur Reinert (Faroe Islands)
6 July 2017
16:00

AEL Limassol (Cyprus)	6–0	(Gibraltar) St Joseph's
Avraam 2'; Elia 37', 45+6'; Benítez 52'; Kyriakou 90'; Mavrou 90+2'	Report

Tsirio Stadium, Limassol
Attendance: 1,774
Referee: Luís Teixeira (Portugal)

AEL Limassol won 10–0 on aggregate.

29 June 2017
20:45

Valletta (Malta)	2–0	(San Marino) Folgore
Borg 42'; Velasco 48'	Report

Hibernians Stadium, Paola
Attendance: 1,141
Referee: Denis Scherbakov (Belarus)
6 July 2017
20:30

Folgore (San Marino)	0–1	(Malta) Valletta
	Report	Malano 65'

San Marino Stadium, Serravalle
Attendance: 437
Referee: Genc Nuza (Kosovo)

Valletta won 3–0 on aggregate.

29 June 2017
19:00

Zaria Bălți (Moldova)	2–1	(Bosnia and Herzegovina) Sarajevo
Zahynaylov 7'; Gómez 33'	Report	Mihojević 74'

Zimbru Stadium, Chișinău (Note: Zaria Bălți played their home matches at Zimbru Stadium, Chișinău, instead of their regular stadium Stadionul Orășenesc, Bălți.)
Attendance: 2,500
Referee: Alexandros Aretopoulos (Greece)
6 July 2017
20:00

Sarajevo (Bosnia and Herzegovina)	2–1 (a.e.t.)	(Moldova) Zaria Bălți
Hebibović 13'; Kadušić 35' (pen.)	Report	Mihojević 60' (o.g.)
Penalties
Hodžić (penalty scored); Ivetić (penalty scored); Mihojević (penalty missed); Bekić (penalty scored); Sarić (penalty scored); Anđušić (penalty scored); Kuzmanović (penalty missed)	5–6	(penalty scored) Slinkin; (penalty scored) Suvorov; (penalty scored) Golovatenco; (penalty scored) Zahynaylov; (penalty missed) Yermak; (penalty scored) Mihaliov; (penalty scored) Focșa

Asim Ferhatović Hase Stadium, Sarajevo
Attendance: 12,000
Referee: Aleksandrs Anufrijevs (Latvia)

3–3 on aggregate; Zaria Bălți won 6–5 on penalties.

29 June 2017
20:45

Rangers (Scotland)	1–0	(Luxembourg) Progrès Niederkorn
Miller 37'	Report

Ibrox Stadium, Glasgow
Attendance: 48,681
Referee: Mohammed Al-Hakim (Sweden)
4 July 2017
19:45

Progrès Niederkorn (Luxembourg)	2–0	(Scotland) Rangers
Françoise 66'; S. Thill 75'	Report

Stade Josy Barthel, Luxembourg City (Note: Progrès Niederkorn played their first qualifying round home match at Stade Josy Barthel, Luxembourg City, and second qualifying round home match at Stade Municipal, Differdange, instead of their regular stadium Stade Jos Haupert, Niederkorn.)
Attendance: 5,534
Referee: Vilhjálmur Alvar Þórarinsson (Iceland)

Progrès Niederkorn won 2–1 on aggregate.

29 June 2017
19:00

AEK Larnaca (Cyprus)	5–0	(Gibraltar) Lincoln Red Imps
Florian 22', 68'; Joan Tomàs 52', 65'; Tričkovski 77' (pen.)	Report

AEK Arena – Georgios Karapatakis, Larnaca
Attendance: 3,496
Referee: Nikolaj Hänni (Switzerland)
6 July 2017
22:00

Lincoln Red Imps (Gibraltar)	1–1	(Cyprus) AEK Larnaca
Bardon 42'	Report	Jorge 78' (pen.)

Estádio Algarve, Faro–Loulé, Portugal
Attendance: 127
Referee: Pavel Orel (Czech Republic)

AEK Larnaca won 6–1 on aggregate.

29 June 2017
20:00

Skënderbeu (Albania)	1–0	(Andorra) Sant Julià
Latifi 69'	Report

Skënderbeu Stadium, Korçë
Attendance: 2,700
Referee: Robert Hennessy (Republic of Ireland)
6 July 2017
20:30

Sant Julià (Andorra)	0–5	(Albania) Skënderbeu
	Report	Vujović 2'; Adeniyi 38'; Latifi 79', 90+3'; Vangjeli 90+1'

Estadi Comunal, Andorra la Vella
Attendance: 700
Referee: Kai Erik Steen (Norway)

Skënderbeu won 6–0 on aggregate.

29 June 2017
17:00

Ventspils (Latvia)	0–0	(Iceland) Valur
	Report

Ventspils Olimpiskais Stadions, Ventspils
Attendance: 1,933
Referee: Rahim Hasanov (Azerbaijan)
6 July 2017
22:00

Valur (Iceland)	1–0	(Latvia) Ventspils
Sigurður 71'	Report

Hlíðarendi, Reykjavík
Attendance: 1,129
Referee: Rob Harvey (Republic of Ireland)

Valur won 1–0 on aggregate.

29 June 2017
20:00

Bala Town (Wales)	1–2	(Liechtenstein) Vaduz
Venables 61'	Report	Zárate 21'; Brunner 29'

Belle Vue, Rhyl (Note: Bala Town played their home match at Belle Vue, Rhyl, instead of their regular stadium Maes Tegid, Bala.)
Attendance: 803
Referee: Alain Durieux (Luxembourg)
6 July 2017
19:00

Vaduz (Liechtenstein)	3–0	(Wales) Bala Town
Turkes 22', 39'; Mathys 43'	Report

Rheinpark Stadion, Vaduz
Attendance: 621
Referee: Jari Järvinen (Finland)

Vaduz won 5–1 on aggregate.

29 June 2017
20:30

Domžale (Slovenia)	2–0	(Estonia) Flora
Repas 77'; Žužek 90'	Report

Arena Petrol, Celje (Note: Domžale played their first qualifying round home match at Arena Petrol, Celje, and third qualifying and play-off rounds home matches at Stožice Stadium, Ljubljana, instead of their regular stadium Sports Park, Domžale.)
Attendance: 724
Referee: João Pinheiro (Portugal)
6 July 2017
18:00

Flora (Estonia)	2–3	(Slovenia) Domžale
Beglarishvili 2'; Ainsalu 22'	Report	Firer 40'; Ibričić 86' (pen.); Balkovec 89'

A. Le Coq Arena, Tallinn
Attendance: 818
Referee: Horațiu Fesnic (Romania)

Domžale won 5–2 on aggregate.

29 June 2017
20:00

Midtjylland (Denmark)	6–1	(Republic of Ireland) Derry City
Dal Hende 4'; Riis 15'; J. Poulsen 44' (pen.); Kroon 59', 61'; Kraev 84'	Report	Curtis 66'

MCH Arena, Herning
Attendance: 5,122
Referee: Markus Hameter (Austria)
6 July 2017
20:45

Derry City (Republic of Ireland)	1–4	(Denmark) Midtjylland
McEneff 41'	Report	Onuachu 7', 38', 69'; Wikheim 59'

The Showgrounds, Sligo (Note: Derry City played their home match at The Showgrounds, Sligo, instead of their regular stadium Brandywell Stadium, Derry, due to renovation.)
Attendance: 467
Referee: Rade Obrenović (Slovenia)

Midtjylland won 10–2 on aggregate.

29 June 2017
19:00

Haugesund (Norway)	7–0	(Northern Ireland) Coleraine
Tronstad 8'; Abdi 33'; Hajradinović 42'; Ikedi 49'; Ibrahim 52'; Huseklepp 61'; Buduson 71'	Report

Haugesund Stadion, Haugesund
Attendance: 2,523
Referee: Alexandru Tean (Moldova)
6 July 2017
20:45

Coleraine (Northern Ireland)	0–0	(Norway) Haugesund
	Report

The Showgrounds, Coleraine
Attendance: 944
Referee: Carlos Xistra (Portugal)

Haugesund won 7–0 on aggregate.

29 June 2017
20:45

St Johnstone (Scotland)	1–2	(Lithuania) Trakai
Shaughnessy 32'	Report	Maksimov 14'; Šilėnas 36'

McDiarmid Park, Perth
Attendance: 5,636
Referee: Fran Jović (Croatia)
6 July 2017
18:00

Trakai (Lithuania)	1–0	(Scotland) St Johnstone
Maksimov 88'	Report

LFF Stadium, Vilnius
Attendance: 2,000
Referee: Stanislav Todorov (Bulgaria)

Trakai won 3–1 on aggregate.

29 June 2017
18:00

VPS (Finland)	1–0	(Slovenia) Olimpija Ljubljana
Vahtera 12'	Report

Hietalahti Stadium, Vaasa
Attendance: 3,989
Referee: Petr Ardeleanu (Czech Republic)
6 July 2017
20:15

Olimpija Ljubljana (Slovenia)	0–1	(Finland) VPS
	Report	Strandvall 66'

Stožice Stadium, Ljubljana
Attendance: 4,700
Referee: Georgios Kominis (Greece)

VPS won 2–0 on aggregate.

29 June 2017
20:45

Crusaders (Northern Ireland)	3–1	(Latvia) Liepāja
Lowry 28'; Carvill 35'; Owens 55'	Report	Karašausks 61'

Seaview, Belfast
Attendance: 1,375
Referee: Anders Poulsen (Denmark)
6 July 2017
18:45

Liepāja (Latvia)	2–0	(Northern Ireland) Crusaders
Eristavi 33' (pen.); Karašausks 90+4'	Report

Daugava Stadium, Liepāja
Attendance: 2,310
Referee: Suren Baliyan (Armenia)

3–3 on aggregate; Liepāja won on away goals.

29 June 2017
17:30

Dinamo Minsk (Belarus)	2–1	(Faroe Islands) NSÍ
Astravukh 42'; Noyok 52'	Report	Knudsen 86'

Traktor Stadium, Minsk
Attendance: 3,480
Referee: Oleksandr Derdo (Ukraine)
6 July 2017
19:30

NSÍ (Faroe Islands)	0–2	(Belarus) Dinamo Minsk
	Report	Saroka 32', 90+5'

Svangaskarð, Toftir (Note: NSÍ Runavík played their home match at Svangaskarð, Toftir, instead of their regular stadium Runavík Stadium, Runavík.)
Attendance: 557
Referee: Iwan Arwel Griffith (Wales)

Dinamo Minsk won 4–1 on aggregate.

29 June 2017
21:15

Stjarnan (Iceland)	0–1	(Republic of Ireland) Shamrock Rovers
	Report	Shaw 38'

Stjörnuvöllur, Garðabær
Attendance: 1,020
Referee: Tomasz Musiał (Poland)
6 July 2017
21:00

Shamrock Rovers (Republic of Ireland)	1–0	(Iceland) Stjarnan
Burke 20'	Report

Tallaght Stadium, Tallaght
Attendance: 3,352
Referee: Glenn Nyberg (Sweden)

Shamrock Rovers won 2–0 on aggregate.

29 June 2017
19:00

Odd (Norway)	3–0	(Northern Ireland) Ballymena United
Mladenovic 1'; Broberg 53'; Haugen 90+2'	Report

Skagerak Arena, Skien
Attendance: 2,969
Referee: Edin Jakupović (Bosnia and Herzegovina)
6 July 2017
20:45

Ballymena United (Northern Ireland)	0–2	(Norway) Odd
	Report	Millar 79' (o.g.); Haugen 88'

Seaview, Belfast (Note: Ballymena United played their home match at Seaview, Belfast, instead of their regular stadium The Showgrounds, Ballymena.)
Attendance: 1,792
Referee: Radek Příhoda (Czech Republic)

Odd won 5–0 on aggregate.

29 June 2017
20:00

Connah's Quay Nomads (Wales)	1–0	(Finland) HJK
Woolfe 40'	Report

Nantporth, Bangor (Note: Connah's Quay Nomads played their home match at Nantporth, Bangor, instead of their regular stadium Deeside Stadium, Connah's Quay.)
Attendance: 472
Referee: Cătălin Gaman (Romania)
6 July 2017
18:00

HJK (Finland)	3–0	(Wales) Connah's Quay Nomads
Yaghoubi 11'; Pelvas 31', 55'	Report

Telia 5G -areena, Helsinki
Attendance: 6,103
Referee: Furkat Atazhanov (Kazakhstan)

HJK won 3–1 on aggregate.

29 June 2017
18:30

Nõmme Kalju (Estonia)	2–1	(Faroe Islands) B36
Tjapkin 13'; Dmitrijev 79'	Report	Johannesen 49'

A. Le Coq Arena, Tallinn (Note: Nõmme Kalju played their first qualifying round home match at A. Le Coq Arena, Tallinn, and second qualifying round home match at Kadriorg Stadium, Tallinn, instead of their regular stadium Hiiu Stadium, Tallinn.)
Attendance: 580
Referee: Leontios Trattou (Cyprus)
6 July 2017
20:00

B36 (Faroe Islands)	1–2	(Estonia) Nõmme Kalju
Heinesen 52'	Report	Liliu 18'; Valikaev 88'

Gundadalur, Tórshavn
Attendance: 1,725
Referee: Espen Eskås (Norway)

Nõmme Kalju won 4–2 on aggregate.

29 June 2017
18:45

Ferencváros (Hungary)	2–0	(Latvia) Jelgava
Varga 11', 69'	Report

Groupama Arena, Budapest
Attendance: 7,123
Referee: Vasilis Dimitriou (Cyprus)
6 July 2017
17:30

Jelgava (Latvia)	0–1	(Hungary) Ferencváros
	Report	Priskin 37'

Zemgale Olympic Center, Jelgava
Attendance: 1,400
Referee: Dumitri Muntean (Moldova)

Ferencváros won 3–0 on aggregate.

29 June 2017
20:00

IFK Norrköping (Sweden)	5–0	(Kosovo) Prishtina
Moberg Karlsson 10'; Andersson 24'; Eliasson 26'; Holmberg 31', 40'	Report

Nya Parken, Norrköping
Attendance: 6,540
Referee: Aleksandrs Golubevs (Latvia)
6 July 2017
20:00

Prishtina (Kosovo)	0–1	(Sweden) IFK Norrköping
	Report	Andersson 71'

Adem Jashari Olympic Stadium, Mitrovica (Note: Prishtina played their home match at Adem Jashari Olympic Stadium, Mitrovica, instead of their regular stadium City Stadium, Pristina.)
Attendance: 1,300
Referee: Jens Maae (Denmark)

IFK Norrköping won 6–0 on aggregate.

29 June 2017
18:00

Shakhtyor Soligorsk (Belarus)	0–0	(Lithuania) Sūduva
	Report

Stroitel Stadium, Salihorsk
Attendance: 3,100
Referee: Alexandr Aliyev (Kazakhstan)
6 July 2017
17:00

Sūduva (Lithuania)	2–1	(Belarus) Shakhtyor Soligorsk
Leimonas 34'; Jankauskas 90+2'	Report	Kavalyow 38'

Sūduva Stadium, Marijampolė
Attendance: 2,000
Referee: Donald Robertson (Scotland)

Sūduva won 2–1 on aggregate.

29 June 2017
21:15

KR (Iceland)	0–0	(Finland) SJK
	Report

KR-völlur, Reykjavík
Attendance: 531
Referee: Zbyněk Proske (Czech Republic)
6 July 2017
18:00

SJK (Finland)	0–2	(Iceland) KR
	Report	Pálmason 51'; Thomsen 83'

OmaSP Stadion, Seinäjoki
Attendance: 4,511
Referee: Irfan Peljto (Bosnia and Herzegovina)

KR won 2–0 on aggregate.

29 June 2017
17:30

Levadia Tallinn (Estonia)	0–2	(Republic of Ireland) Cork City
	Report	Buckley 43'; Beattie 82'

Pärnu Rannastaadion, Pärnu (Note: Levadia Tallinn played their home match at Pärnu Rannastaadion, Pärnu, instead of their regular stadium Kadriorg Stadium, Tallinn.)
Attendance: 1,500
Referee: Jørgen Burchardt (Denmark)
6 July 2017
20:45

Cork City (Republic of Ireland)	4–2	(Estonia) Levadia Tallinn
Sheppard 28'; Maguire 46', 86', 90'	Report	Kobzar 15'; Andreyev 33'

Turners Cross, Cork
Attendance: 6,314
Referee: Gunnar Jarl Jónsson (Iceland)

Cork City won 6–2 on aggregate.

29 June 2017
18:30

Lyngby (Denmark)	1–0	(Wales) Bangor City
Blume 13'	Report

Lyngby Stadium, Kongens Lyngby
Attendance: 2,574
Referee: Stavros Mantalos (Greece)
6 July 2017
19:30

Bangor City (Wales)	0–3	(Denmark) Lyngby
	Report	K. Larsen 3', 43'; Kjær 37'

Nantporth, Bangor
Attendance: 1,089
Referee: Donatas Rumšas (Lithuania)

Lyngby won 4–0 on aggregate.

29 June 2017
20:00

KÍ (Faroe Islands)	0–0	(Sweden) AIK
	Report

Gundadalur, Tórshavn (Note: KÍ played their home match at Gundadalur, Tórshavn, instead of their regular stadium Við Djúpumýrar, Klaksvík.)
Attendance: 1,374
Referee: Michal Ocenáš (Slovakia)
6 July 2017
19:00

AIK (Sweden)	5–0	(Faroe Islands) KÍ
Markkanen 3', 6', 42'; Ishizaki 16'; Olsson 24'	Report

Friends Arena, Solna
Attendance: 6,257
Referee: Laurent Kopriwa (Luxembourg)

AIK won 5–0 on aggregate.

== Second qualifying round ==
=== Summary ===
The first legs were played on 12 and 13 July, and the second legs were played on 20 July 2017.

Team 1	Agg.	Team 2	1st leg	2nd leg
Beitar Jerusalem (Israel)	1–5 (Note: Order of legs reversed after original draw.)	(Bulgaria) Botev Plovdiv	1–1	0–4
Apollon Limassol (Cyprus)	5–1	(Moldova) Zaria Bălți	3–0	2–1
Rabotnicki (North Macedonia)	1–4	(Belarus) Dinamo Minsk	1–1	0–3
Slovan Bratislava (Slovakia)	1–3	(Denmark) Lyngby	0–1	1–2
Shamrock Rovers (Republic of Ireland)	2–5	(Czech Republic) Mladá Boleslav	2–3	0–2
Željezničar (Bosnia and Herzegovina)	0–2	(Sweden) AIK	0–0	0–2
Cork City (Republic of Ireland)	0–2	(Cyprus) AEK Larnaca	0–1	0–1
Kairat (Kazakhstan)	1–3	(Albania) Skënderbeu	1–1	0–2
Panionios (Greece)	5–2	(Slovenia) Gorica	2–0	3–2
Astra Giurgiu (Romania)	3–1	(Azerbaijan) Zira	3–1	0–0
Haugesund (Norway)	3–4	(Poland) Lech Poznań	3–2	0–2
Brøndby (Denmark)	3–2	(Finland) VPS	2–0	1–2
IFK Norrköping (Sweden)	3–3 (3–5 p)	(Lithuania) Trakai	2–1	1–2 (a.e.t.)
Hajduk Split (Croatia)	3–1	(Bulgaria) Levski Sofia	1–0	2–1
Nõmme Kalju (Estonia)	1–4	(Hungary) Videoton	0–3	1–1
Maccabi Tel Aviv (Israel)	5–1	(Iceland) KR	3–1	2–0
Valletta (Malta)	1–3	(Netherlands) Utrecht	0–0	1–3
Ružomberok (Slovakia)	2–1	(Norway) Brann	0–1	2–0
Liepāja (Latvia)	1–2	(Lithuania) Sūduva	0–2	1–0
Gabala (Azerbaijan)	3–1	(Poland) Jagiellonia Białystok	1–1	2–0
Progrès Niederkorn (Luxembourg)	1–3	(Cyprus) AEL Limassol	0–1	1–2
Rheindorf Altach (Austria)	4–1	(Belarus) Dynamo Brest	1–1	3–0
Östersunds FK (Sweden)	3–1	(Turkey) Galatasaray	2–0	1–1
Inter Baku (Azerbaijan)	2–4	(Luxembourg) Fola Esch	1–0	1–4
Vaduz (Liechtenstein)	0–2	(Norway) Odd	0–1	0–1
Valur (Iceland)	3–5	(Slovenia) Domžale	1–2	2–3
Irtysh (Kazakhstan)	1–3	(Serbia) Red Star Belgrade	1–1	0–2
Aberdeen (Scotland)	3–1	(Bosnia and Herzegovina) Široki Brijeg	1–1	2–0
Ferencváros (Hungary)	3–7	(Denmark) Midtjylland	2–4	1–3
Sturm Graz (Austria)	3–1	(Montenegro) Mladost Podgorica	0–1	3–0
Shkëndija (North Macedonia)	4–2	(Finland) HJK	3–1	1–1
Trenčín (Slovakia)	1–3	(Israel) Bnei Yehuda	1–1	0–2
Osijek (Croatia)	3–2	(Switzerland) Luzern	2–0	1–2

=== Matches ===
13 July 2017
20:00

Beitar Jerusalem (Israel)	1–1	(Bulgaria) Botev Plovdiv
Kachila 11'	Report	Yusein 73'

HaMoshava Stadium, Petah Tikva
Attendance: 9,450
Referee: Bartosz Frankowski (Poland)
20 July 2017
19:30

Botev Plovdiv (Bulgaria)	4–0	(Israel) Beitar Jerusalem
Dimov 10'; Viana 32'; Baltanov 47'; Brisola 90'	Report

Lazur Stadium, Burgas
Attendance: 6,400
Referee: Kirill Levnikov (Russia)

Botev Plovdiv won 5–1 on aggregate.

13 July 2017
19:00

Apollon Limassol (Cyprus)	3–0	(Moldova) Zaria Bălți
Schembri 10'; Alex 21' (pen.); João Pedro 28'	Report

AEK Arena – Georgios Karapatakis, Larnaca (Note: Apollon Limassol played their home matches at AEK Arena – Georgios Karapatakis, Larnaca, instead of their regular stadium Tsirio Stadium, Limassol.)
Attendance: 4,450
Referee: Ádám Farkas (Hungary)
20 July 2017
19:00

Zaria Bălți (Moldova)	1–2	(Cyprus) Apollon Limassol
Focșa 47'	Report	Alex 45' (pen.); Schembri 80'

Zimbru Stadium, Chișinău
Attendance: 2,191
Referee: Alexandre Boucaut (Belgium)

Apollon Limassol won 5–1 on aggregate.

13 July 2017
18:00

Rabotnicki (North Macedonia)	1–1	(Belarus) Dinamo Minsk
Najdenov 90+3' (pen.)	Report	Khvashchynski 53'

Training Centre Petar Miloševski, Skopje
Attendance: 510
Referee: Arnold Hunter (Northern Ireland)
20 July 2017
17:00

Dinamo Minsk (Belarus)	3–0	(North Macedonia) Rabotnicki
Noyok 21'; Galović 70'; Saroka 84'	Report

Traktor Stadium, Minsk
Attendance: 3,500
Referee: Nicolas Rainville (France)

Dinamo Minsk won 4–1 on aggregate.

13 July 2017
20:15

Slovan Bratislava (Slovakia)	0–1	(Denmark) Lyngby
	Report	Kjær 75'

Štadión Pasienky, Bratislava
Attendance: 3,817
Referee: Nenad Đokić (Serbia)
20 July 2017
17:00

Lyngby (Denmark)	2–1	(Slovakia) Slovan Bratislava
Rygaard Jensen 19' (pen.); Ørnskov 30'	Report	Oršula 90'

Lyngby Stadium, Kongens Lyngby
Attendance: 2,286
Referee: Vilhjálmur Alvar Þórarinsson (Iceland)

Lyngby won 3–1 on aggregate.

13 July 2017
21:00

Shamrock Rovers (Republic of Ireland)	2–3	(Czech Republic) Mladá Boleslav
Burke 48', 90+2'	Report	Mebrahtu 35', 63'; Chramosta 88'

Tallaght Stadium, Tallaght
Attendance: 3,160
Referee: Bojan Pandžić (Sweden)
20 July 2017
18:00

Mladá Boleslav (Czech Republic)	2–0	(Republic of Ireland) Shamrock Rovers
Chramosta 9'; Mebrahtu 31'	Report

Městský stadion, Mladá Boleslav
Attendance: 4,727
Referee: Giorgi Kruashvili (Georgia)

Mladá Boleslav won 5–2 on aggregate.

13 July 2017
20:50

Željezničar (Bosnia and Herzegovina)	0–0	(Sweden) AIK
	Report

Stadion Grbavica, Sarajevo
Attendance: 11,170
Referee: Adrien Jaccottet (Switzerland)
20 July 2017
19:00

AIK (Sweden)	2–0	(Bosnia and Herzegovina) Željezničar
Johansson 48'; Goitom 85'	Report

Friends Arena, Solna
Attendance: 9,126
Referee: Georgios Kominis (Greece)

AIK won 2–0 on aggregate.

13 July 2017
20:45

Cork City (Republic of Ireland)	0–1	(Cyprus) AEK Larnaca
	Report	Truyols 70'

Turners Cross, Cork
Attendance: 6,441
Referee: François Letexier (France)
20 July 2017
19:00

AEK Larnaca (Cyprus)	1–0	(Republic of Ireland) Cork City
Florian 33'	Report

AEK Arena – Georgios Karapatakis, Larnaca
Attendance: 3,771
Referee: Pavle Radovanović (Montenegro)

AEK Larnaca won 2–0 on aggregate.

13 July 2017
16:45

Kairat (Kazakhstan)	1–1	(Albania) Skënderbeu
Gohou 9'	Report	Nimaga 72'

Central Stadium, Almaty
Attendance: 7,054
Referee: Leontios Trattou (Cyprus)
20 July 2017
20:00

Skënderbeu (Albania)	2–0	(Kazakhstan) Kairat
Lilaj 50'; Plaku 83'	Report

Skënderbeu Stadium, Korçë
Attendance: 4,800
Referee: Jens Maae (Denmark)

Skënderbeu won 3–1 on aggregate.

13 July 2017
21:00

Panionios (Greece)	2–0	(Slovenia) Gorica
Yeşil 12', 47'	Report

Nea Smyrni Stadium, Athens
Attendance: 3,298
Referee: Hugo Miguel (Portugal)
20 July 2017
20:45

Gorica (Slovenia)	2–3	(Greece) Panionios
Kapić 15' (pen.), 67' (pen.)	Report	Masouras 11'; Yeşil 16'; Lamprou 23'

Sports Park, Nova Gorica
Attendance: 1,400
Referee: Anatoliy Abdula (Ukraine)

Panionios won 5–2 on aggregate.

13 July 2017
19:30

Astra Giurgiu (Romania)	3–1	(Azerbaijan) Zira
Ioniță 31'; Dandea 55'; Le Tallec 74'	Report	Sadiqov 34'

Stadionul Marin Anastasovici, Giurgiu
Attendance: 1,730
Referee: Sergey Tsinkevich (Belarus)
20 July 2017
19:00

Zira (Azerbaijan)	0–0	(Romania) Astra Giurgiu
	Report

Dalga Arena, Baku
Attendance: 4,200
Referee: Giorgi Vadachkoria (Georgia)

Astra Giurgiu won 3–1 on aggregate.

13 July 2017
19:00

Haugesund (Norway)	3–2	(Poland) Lech Poznań
Abdi 24'; Hajradinović 71'; Ibrahim 73'	Report	Majewski 75'; Jevtić 90+3' (pen.)

Haugesund Stadion, Haugesund
Attendance: 4,011
Referee: Alain Bieri (Switzerland)
20 July 2017
20:00

Lech Poznań (Poland)	2–0	(Norway) Haugesund
Jevtić 32'; Nielsen 90+3'	Report

INEA Stadion, Poznań
Attendance: 21,968
Referee: Alexander Harkam (Austria)

Lech Poznań won 4–3 on aggregate.

13 July 2017
18:30

Brøndby (Denmark)	2–0	(Finland) VPS
Pukki 16'; Fisker 28'	Report

Brøndby Stadium, Brøndbyvester
Attendance: 8,533
Referee: Bart Vertenten (Belgium)
20 July 2017
18:00

VPS (Finland)	2–1	(Denmark) Brøndby
Voutilainen 11'; Sohna 40'	Report	Meerits 16' (o.g.)

Hietalahti Stadium, Vaasa
Attendance: 4,385
Referee: Paolo Valeri (Italy)

Brøndby won 3–2 on aggregate.

13 July 2017
20:00

IFK Norrköping (Sweden)	2–1	(Lithuania) Trakai
Andersson 32'; Holmberg 61'	Report	Maksimov 66'

Nya Parken, Norrköping
Attendance: 5,133
Referee: Amaury Delerue (France)
20 July 2017
18:00

Trakai (Lithuania)	2–1 (a.e.t.)	(Sweden) IFK Norrköping
Maksimov 11', 35'	Report	Skrabb 86'
Penalties
Klimavičius (penalty scored); Vorobjovas (penalty scored); Čyžas (penalty scored); Shyshka (penalty scored); Januševskij (penalty scored)	5–3	(penalty scored) Wahlqvist; (penalty missed) Smith; (penalty scored) Eliasson; (penalty scored) Skrabb

LFF Stadium, Vilnius
Attendance: 2,750
Referee: Dennis Higler (Netherlands)

3–3 on aggregate; Trakai won 5–3 on penalties.

13 July 2017
20:30

Hajduk Split (Croatia)	1–0	(Bulgaria) Levski Sofia
Futács 24' (pen.)	Report

Stadion Hrvatski vitezovi, Dugopolje (Note: Hajduk Split played their second qualifying round home match at Stadion Hrvatski vitezovi, Dugopolje, instead of their regular stadium Stadion Poljud, Split.)
Attendance: 5,000
Referee: Mohammed Al-Hakim (Sweden)
20 July 2017
19:00

Levski Sofia (Bulgaria)	1–2	(Croatia) Hajduk Split
Buș 69'	Report	Ohandza 80'; Erceg 86'

Vivacom Arena - Georgi Asparuhov Stadium, Sofia
Attendance: 0
Referee: Ali Palabıyık (Turkey)

Hajduk Split won 3–1 on aggregate.

13 July 2017
18:15

Nõmme Kalju (Estonia)	0–3	(Hungary) Videoton
	Report	Pátkai 8'; Šćepović 47' (pen.), 74' (pen.)

Kadriorg Stadium, Tallinn
Attendance: 760
Referee: João Capela (Portugal) (Note: Capela was injured and replaced by fourth official Luís Godinho (Portugal) in the 35th minute.)
20 July 2017
21:00

Videoton (Hungary)	1–1	(Estonia) Nõmme Kalju
Lazović 37'	Report	Dmitrijev 50' (pen.)

Pancho Aréna, Felcsút
Attendance: 2,612
Referee: Mario Zebec (Croatia)

Videoton won 4–1 on aggregate.

13 July 2017
17:00

Maccabi Tel Aviv (Israel)	3–1	(Iceland) KR
Schoenfeld 65'; Kjartansson 79'; Atzili 82'	Report	Pálmason 58'

Netanya Stadium, Netanya
Attendance: 6,923
Referee: Anastasios Papapetrou (Greece)
20 July 2017
21:15

KR (Iceland)	0–2	(Israel) Maccabi Tel Aviv
	Report	Atzili 57'; Peretz 66'

KR-völlur, Reykjavík
Attendance: 609
Referee: Ivaylo Stoyanov (Bulgaria)

Maccabi Tel Aviv won 5–1 on aggregate.

13 July 2017
19:30

Valletta (Malta)	0–0	(Netherlands) Utrecht
	Report

Hibernians Stadium, Paola
Attendance: 1,795
Referee: Ognjen Valjić (Bosnia and Herzegovina)
20 July 2017
19:30

Utrecht (Netherlands)	3–1	(Malta) Valletta
Klaiber 18'; Janssen 76'; Labyad 83'	Report	Malano 88'

Mandemakers Stadion, Waalwijk (Note: Utrecht played their second qualifying round home match at Mandemakers Stadion, Waalwijk, instead of their regular stadium Stadion Galgenwaard, Utrecht.)
Attendance: 5,550
Referee: Ian McNabb (Northern Ireland)

Utrecht won 3–1 on aggregate.

13 July 2017
18:00

Ružomberok (Slovakia)	0–1	(Norway) Brann
	Report	Acosta 47'

Štadión pod Čebraťom, Ružomberok
Attendance: 4,487
Referee: Kevin Clancy (Scotland)
20 July 2017
19:00

Brann (Norway)	0–2	(Slovakia) Ružomberok
	Report	Qose 64'; Kružliak 78' (pen.)

Brann Stadion, Bergen
Attendance: 4,688
Referee: Artyom Kuchin (Kazakhstan)

Ružomberok won 2–1 on aggregate.

13 July 2017
18:45

Liepāja (Latvia)	0–2	(Lithuania) Sūduva
	Report	Verbickas 18'; Laukžemis 75'

Daugava Stadium, Liepāja
Attendance: 2,798
Referee: Erez Papir (Israel)
20 July 2017
18:00

Sūduva (Lithuania)	0–1	(Latvia) Liepāja
	Report	Keita 57'

Sūduva Stadium, Marijampolė
Attendance: 2,632
Referee: Laurent Kopriwa (Luxembourg)

Sūduva won 2–1 on aggregate.

13 July 2017
19:00

Gabala (Azerbaijan)	1–1	(Poland) Jagiellonia Białystok
Joseph-Monrose 47'	Report	Romanchuk 15'

Bakcell Arena, Baku (Note: Gabala played their home matches at Bakcell Arena, Baku, instead of their regular stadium City Stadium, Qabala.)
Attendance: 6,500
Referee: Marco Fritz (Germany)
20 July 2017
20:30

Jagiellonia Białystok (Poland)	0–2	(Azerbaijan) Gabala
	Report	Gurbanov 18'; Ozobić 89'

City Stadium, Białystok
Attendance: 13,326
Referee: Sebastian Colțescu (Romania)

Gabala won 3–1 on aggregate.

13 July 2017
19:45

Progrès Niederkorn (Luxembourg)	0–1	(Cyprus) AEL Limassol
	Report	Arruabarrena 66'

Stade Municipal, Differdange
Attendance: 1,929
Referee: Massimiliano Irrati (Italy)
20 July 2017
20:00

AEL Limassol (Cyprus)	2–1	(Luxembourg) Progrès Niederkorn
Irhene 70'; Lafrance 88'	Report	Françoise 83'

Antonis Papadopoulos Stadium, Larnaca (Note: AEL Limassol played their second and third qualifying rounds home matches at Antonis Papadopoulos Stadium, Larnaca, instead of their regular stadium Tsirio Stadium, Limassol.)
Attendance: 3,740
Referee: Frank Schneider (France)

AEL Limassol won 3–1 on aggregate.

13 July 2017
18:30

Rheindorf Altach (Austria)	1–1	(Belarus) Dynamo Brest
Nutz 49'	Report	Sedko 74'

Stadion Schnabelholz, Altach
Attendance: 2,811
Referee: Luca Barbeno (San Marino)
20 July 2017
18:30

Dynamo Brest (Belarus)	0–3	(Austria) Rheindorf Altach
	Report	Ngamaleu 8'; Nutz 44'; Netzer 52'

Regional Sport Complex Brestsky, Brest
Attendance: 10,000
Referee: Keith Kennedy (Northern Ireland)

Rheindorf Altach won 4–1 on aggregate.

13 July 2017
19:00

Östersunds FK (Sweden)	2–0	(Turkey) Galatasaray
Ghoddos 68'; Hopcutt 90+2'	Report

Jämtkraft Arena, Östersund
Attendance: 5,407
Referee: Juan Martínez Munuera (Spain)
20 July 2017
19:30

Galatasaray (Turkey)	1–1	(Sweden) Östersunds FK
Çalık 69'	Report	Nouri 60' (pen.)

Türk Telekom Stadium, Istanbul
Attendance: 33,646
Referee: Bastian Dankert (Germany)

Östersunds FK won 3–1 on aggregate.

12 July 2017
18:00

Inter Baku (Azerbaijan)	1–0	(Luxembourg) Fola Esch
Seyidov 89'	Report

Dalga Arena, Baku
Attendance: 2,500
Referee: Eitan Shmuelevitz (Israel)
20 July 2017
19:30

Fola Esch (Luxembourg)	4–1	(Azerbaijan) Inter Baku
Hadji 21'; Saiti 32'; Laterza 59'; Sacras 90+4'	Report	Fardjad-Azad 70'

Stade Émile Mayrisch, Esch-sur-Alzette
Attendance: 1,250
Referee: Donatas Rumšas (Lithuania)

Fola Esch won 4–2 on aggregate.

13 July 2017
19:00

Vaduz (Liechtenstein)	0–1	(Norway) Odd
	Report	Occéan 42'

Rheinpark Stadion, Vaduz
Attendance: 1,043
Referee: Antti Munukka (Finland)
20 July 2017
19:00

Odd (Norway)	1–0	(Liechtenstein) Vaduz
Mladenovic 82'	Report

Skagerak Arena, Skien
Attendance: 2,492
Referee: Aleksandar Vasić (Serbia)

Odd won 2–0 on aggregate.

13 July 2017
22:00

Valur (Iceland)	1–2	(Slovenia) Domžale
Lárusson 36' (pen.)	Report	Repas 23'; Ibričić 73' (pen.)

Hlíðarendi, Reykjavík
Attendance: 794
Referee: Tore Hansen (Norway)
20 July 2017
20:00

Domžale (Slovenia)	3–2	(Iceland) Valur
Firer 25' (pen.); Balkovec 69'; Ibričić 71'	Report	Lýðsson 3' (pen.); Bøgild 43'

Sports Park, Domžale
Attendance: 1,900
Referee: Dimitar Mečkarovski (Macedonia)

Domžale won 5–3 on aggregate.

13 July 2017
16:00

Irtysh (Kazakhstan)	1–1	(Serbia) Red Star Belgrade
Živković 90+3' (pen.)	Report	Boakye 51' (pen.)

Central Stadium, Pavlodar
Attendance: 8,500
Referee: Marius Avram (Romania)
20 July 2017
20:30

Red Star Belgrade (Serbia)	2–0	(Kazakhstan) Irtysh
Donald 10'; Srnić 77'	Report

Rajko Mitić Stadium, Belgrade
Attendance: 22,414
Referee: Fedayi San (Switzerland)

Red Star Belgrade won 3–1 on aggregate.

13 July 2017
20:45

Aberdeen (Scotland)	1–1	(Bosnia and Herzegovina) Široki Brijeg
Christie 17'	Report	Marković 69'

Pittodrie Stadium, Aberdeen
Attendance: 17,067
Referee: Erik Lambrechts (Belgium)
20 July 2017
20:45

Široki Brijeg (Bosnia and Herzegovina)	0–2	(Scotland) Aberdeen
	Report	Stewart 72'; Mackay-Steven 78'

Stadion Pecara, Široki Brijeg
Attendance: 4,800
Referee: Michael Tykgaard (Denmark)

Aberdeen won 3–1 on aggregate.

13 July 2017
21:00

Ferencváros (Hungary)	2–4	(Denmark) Midtjylland
Botka 22'; R. Varga 42'	Report	J. Poulsen 45+1' (pen.), 61', 67' (pen.); Onuachu 90'

Groupama Arena, Budapest
Attendance: 8,034
Referee: Sandro Schärer (Switzerland)
20 July 2017
19:00

Midtjylland (Denmark)	3–1	(Hungary) Ferencváros
Wikheim 34'; Nissen 71'; Sørloth 81'	Report	Rui Pedro 64'

MCH Arena, Herning
Attendance: 5,413
Referee: Alper Ulusoy (Turkey)

Midtjylland won 7–3 on aggregate.

13 July 2017
20:30

Sturm Graz (Austria)	0–1	(Montenegro) Mladost Podgorica
	Report	Krkotić 2' (pen.)

Liebenauer Stadium, Graz
Attendance: 7,109
Referee: Mattias Gestranius (Finland)
20 July 2017
20:30

Mladost Podgorica (Montenegro)	0–3	(Austria) Sturm Graz
	Report	Röcher 33'; Zulechner 39'; Alar 46'

City Stadium, Podgorica
Attendance: 5,500
Referee: Nikola Popov (Bulgaria)

Sturm Graz won 3–1 on aggregate.

13 July 2017
18:00

Shkëndija (North Macedonia)	3–1	(Finland) HJK
Ibraimi 45' (pen.), 59', 64' (pen.)	Report	Jallow 35'

Stadion Mladost, Strumica
Attendance: 1,492
Referee: Markus Hameter (Austria)
20 July 2017
18:00

HJK (Finland)	1–1	(North Macedonia) Shkëndija
Radeski 28' (o.g.)	Report	Čeliković 71'

Telia 5G -areena, Helsinki
Attendance: 5,326
Referee: Gunnar Jarl Jónsson (Iceland)

Shkëndija won 4–2 on aggregate.

13 July 2017
20:30

Trenčín (Slovakia)	1–1	(Israel) Bnei Yehuda
Paur 59'	Report	Valskis 3'

Stadium Myjava, Myjava (Note: Trenčín played their second qualifying round home match at Stadium Myjava, Myjava, instead of their regular stadium Štadión na Sihoti, Trenčín.)
Attendance: 2,365
Referee: José María Sánchez Martínez (Spain)
20 July 2017
19:00

Bnei Yehuda (Israel)	2–0	(Slovakia) Trenčín
Tchibota 50'; Ashkenazi 85'	Report

HaMoshava Stadium, Petah Tikva (Note: Bnei Yehuda played their home matches at HaMoshava Stadium, Petah Tikva, instead of their regular stadium Bloomfield Stadium, Tel Aviv, due to renovation.)
Attendance: 1,700
Referee: Tomasz Musiał (Poland)

Bnei Yehuda won 3–1 on aggregate.

13 July 2017
20:45

Osijek (Croatia)	2–0	(Switzerland) Luzern
Ejupi 66'; Grezda 79'	Report

Stadion Gradski vrt, Osijek
Attendance: 7,542
Referee: Marco Guida (Italy)
20 July 2017
19:45

Luzern (Switzerland)	2–1	(Croatia) Osijek
Juric 19', 62'	Report	Ejupi 72'

Swissporarena, Lucerne
Attendance: 8,483
Referee: Martin Lundby (Norway)

Osijek won 3–2 on aggregate.
