= Jakob Dallevedove =

German footballer (born 1987)

Personal information
- Date of birth: 21 November 1987 (age 38)
- Place of birth: Trier, West Germany
- Height: 1.83 m (6 ft 0 in)
- Position: Midfielder

Youth career
- SV Wiltingen
- SV Konz
- 1. FC Kaiserslautern
- –2006: Eintracht Trier

Senior career*
Years	Team	Apps	(Gls)
2006–2008	Schalke 04 II	36	(8)
2008–2010	FC Ingolstadt 04	1	(0)
2008–2010	FC Ingolstadt 04 II	11	(1)
2010–2018	Fola Esch	203	(51)
2018–2019	Fola Esch	5	(0)
2019	→ Victoria Rosport (loan)	13	(1)
2019–2020	Victoria Rosport	10	(1)
- * Club domestic league appearances and goals as of 21:55, 7 April 2022 (UTC)

Jakob Dallevedove (born 21 November 1987) is a German footballer who plays as a midfielder.

== Career ==
Dallevedove was born in Trier. He began his career with SV Wiltingen and later joined 1. FC Kaiserslautern. After a few years he was scouted by SV Eintracht Trier 05. In July 2006, Dallevedove joined FC Schalke 04. After two years with 36 matches and eight goals he signed on 8 May 2008 a contract with FC Ingolstadt 04. He made his professional debut in the 2. Bundesliga for FC Ingolstadt on 12 September 2008, when he came on as a substitute in the 79th minute in a game against Alemannia Aachen. After just one season with FC Ingolstadt, he was demoted to the reserve team.

Eighteen months later, Dallevedove moved to Luxembourg, joining CS Fola Esch. In the summer 2018, he got released due to sporting reasons. But in mid August 2018, he signed with the club once again and on 9 January 2019 he left the club for the second club, this time to join FC Victoria Rosport. In July 2020, after being told he was not in Victoria Rosport's plans despite a running contract until 2021, he trained with former club Eintracht Trier.
