= Nicolas Bøgild =

Danish footballer (born 1988)

Personal information
- Date of birth: 23 February 1988 (age 38)
- Position: Forward

Team information
- Current team: Valur
- Number: 9

Youth career
- –2010: Randers Freja

Senior career*
| Years | Team | Apps | (Gls) |
| 2010 | Randers | 1 | (0) |
| 2010–2015 | Skive | | |
| 2015–2017 | Vendsyssel | 31 | (4) |
| 2017– | Valur | 14 | (1) |
- * Club domestic league appearances and goals as of 30 September 2017

Nicolas Bøgild (born 23 February 1988) is a Danish football player. He plays for Valur.

He is currently playing for FC Firkloeveren, struggling to make the first team behind Mogens Jensen, Alexander Caroe, and Jon Hoffmann.

== Club career ==
He made his Danish Superliga debut for Randers on 14 March 2010 in a game against Nordsjælland.
